= List of compositions for violin and orchestra =

Listicle of musical compositions for violin and orchestra

This is a list of musical compositions for violin and orchestra. See entries for concerto and violin concerto for a description of related musical forms.

== Concertos ==
=== A ===
- Jean-Baptiste Accolay
  - Violin Concerto No. 1 (1868)
  - Violin Concerto No. 2 (1895)
  - Violin Concerto No. 3 (1899)
- Joseph Achron
  - Violin Concerto No. 1 (1927)
- Lee Actor
  - Concerto for Violin and Orchestra (2005)
- Marina Adamia
  - Concerto for violin and symphony orchestra (1983)
- John Adams
  - Violin Concerto (1993)
  - The Dharma at Big Sur (2003)
- Thomas Adès
  - Concentric Paths, Concerto for Violin and Orchestra (2005)
- Lejla Agolli
  - Violin concerto No. 1
  - Violin concerto No. 2
- Miguel del Águila
  - Violin Concerto (2008)
- Kalevi Aho
  - Violin Concerto No. 1 (1981)
  - Violin Concert No. 2 (2015)
- Necil Kazım Akses
  - Violin Concerto (1972)
- Eleanor Alberga
  - Violin concerto No. 1 (2001)
- Mark Alburger
  - Violin Concerto ("Ticklish"), Op. 87 (2000)
- Luna Alcalay
  - Sentenzen (1996)
- Maria de Alvear
  - Hilos de oro, for voice, violin and orchestra (1991)
  - Agua dulce, for oboe, violin and orchestra (1994)
- William Alwyn
  - Violin Concerto (1939)
- Hendrik Andriessen
  - Violin Concerto (1969)
- Jurriaan Andriessen
  - Violin Concerto (1992)
- Caroline Ansink
  - Concerto for violin and orchestra (1986)
- George Antheil
  - Concerto for Violin and Orchestra (1946)
- Malcolm Arnold
  - Concerto for two violins and string orchestra. Op. 77
- Violet Archer
  - Concerto for violin and orchestra (1959)
- Claude Arrieu (Louise-Marie Simon)
  - Violin concerto No. 1 in E minor (1938)
  - Violin concerto No. 2 in D minor (1949)
- Clarice Assad
  - Violin Concerto (2004)
- Kurt Atterberg
  - Violin Concerto (1914)
- Lera Auerbach
  - Violin Concerto No. 1 (2003)
  - Violin Concerto No. 2 (2004)
  - "De Profundis" Violin Concerto No. 3 (2015)
  - "The Infant Minstrel and His Peculiar Menagerie" for Violin, Choir and Orchestra (2016)
- Lydia Auster
  - Lyrical concertino "Summer in Käsmu", Op. 25 (1966)
- Tor Aulin
  - Violin Concerto No. 1 in G minor (1891)
  - Violin Concerto No. 2 (1893)
  - Violin Concerto No. 3 in C minor (1906)

=== B ===
- Grażyna Bacewicz
  - Seven violin concertos (1937–1965)
- Johann Sebastian Bach
  - Violin Concerto in A minor, BWV 1041 (1717–1723)
  - Violin Concerto in E major, BWV 1042 (1717–1723)
  - Double Violin Concerto in D minor, BWV 1043 (1723)
- Henk Badings
  - Violin Concerto No. 1 (1928)
  - Violin Concerto No. 2 (1935)
  - Violin Concerto No. 3 (1944)
  - Violin Concerto No. 4 (1947)
  - Double Violin Concerto No. 1 (1954)
  - Double Violin Concerto No. 2 (1969)
- Leonardo Balada
  - Violin Concerto No. 1 (1982)
- Osvaldas Balakauskas
  - Concerto RK (1997)
  - Concerto Brio (1999)
- Samuel Barber
  - Violin Concerto, Op. 14 (1939)
- Sergei Barsukov
  - Violin Concerto No. 2 (1962)
- Wolfgang von Bartels
  - Violin concerto Op. 17 (1927)
- Ethel Barns
  - Violin Concerto in A major (1904)
- Béla Bartók
  - Violin Concerto No. 1 (1908)
  - Violin Concerto No. 2 (1938)
- Mason Bates
  - Violin Concerto (2012)
- Anton Bauer
  - Violin concerto (1921)
- Arnold Bax
  - Violin Concerto (1937)
- Norma Beecroft
  - Improvvisazioni concertanti No. 2, for violin and orchestra
- Sally Beamish
  - Violin Concerto (1994)
- Ludwig van Beethoven
  - Violin Concerto in D major, Op. 61 (1806)
  - Violin Concerto in C major, WoO 5 (fragment, c. 1790)
- Paul Ben-Haim
  - Violin Concerto (1960)
- Alban Berg
  - Violin Concerto (1935)
- Erik Bergman
  - Violin Concerto, Op. 99 (1984)
- William Bergsma
  - Violin Concerto (1965)
- Luciano Berio
  - Violin Concerto
- Charles de Bériot
  - Nine violin concertos
- Franz Berwald
  - Violin Concerto in C♯ minor (1820)
- Harrison Birtwistle
  - Concerto for Violin and Orchestra (2009–10)
- Daniel Bjarnason
  - Violin Concerto (2017)
- Bruno Bjelinski
  - Violin Concerto (1952)
- Boris Blacher
  - Violin Concerto (1948)
- Ernest Bloch
  - Violin Concerto in A minor (1938)
- Luigi Boccherini
  - Violin Concerto in D major (Casadesus forgery)
- Sylvie Bodorova
  - Concerto for violin and orchestra "Messagio" (1989)
- Karl Boelter
  - Violin Concerto (1999)
- Rob du Bois
  - Concerto for violin and orchestra (1975)
  - Concerto for two violins and orchestra (1979)
- Corentin Boissier
  - "The Intemporal", concert(in)o for violin and (chamber) orchestra in D minor (2010)
- Paul Gregory Bonneau
  - Violin concerto 'American Dream: I Wanto to Rule the World' (2005)
- Nimrod Borenstein
  - Concerto for Violin and Orchestra Op. 60 (2013)
- Hakon Børresen
  - Violin Concerto in G major, Op. 11 (1904)
- Henriette Bosmans
  - Concertstuk, for violin and orchestra (1934)
  - Grave funebre, for violin and orchestra
  - Violin caprices 5 & 8, for violin and orchestra
- Susan Botti
  - Within darkness, for violin and chamber orchestra (2000)
- Hendrik Bouman
  - Violin Concerto in D major for Simon Standage (2008)(site)
- Brian Boydell
  - Violin Concerto, Op. 36 (1953–54)
- Ina Boyle
  - Concerto for violin and orchestra (1932-33 rev. 1935)
  - Fantasy for violin and chamber orchestra (1926)
- Desmond Bradley
  - Violin concerto (1969)
- Johannes Brahms
  - Violin Concerto in D major, Op. 77 (1878)
- Matija Bravničar
  - Violin Concerto (1962)
- Johannes Bernardus van Bree
  - Violin Concerto
- Therese Brenet
  - Odi et amo, for violin and orchestra (1992)
  - Poeme, for violin and orchestra (1994)
  - Seuls tes yeux demeurerent, for violin and orchestra (2000)
- Havergal Brian
  - Violin Concerto No. 2 in C major (no. 1 lost) (1934–5)
- Benjamin Britten
  - Violin Concerto, Op. 15 (1939, rev. 1954, 1965)
- Mikhail Bronner
  - Violin Concerto 'Lonely Voice' (1992)
  - Violin Concerto 'Heaven's Gate' (2001)
- Stephen Brown
  - Violin Concerto 'The Ouroboros' (2017)
- Max Bruch
  - Violin Concerto No. 1 in G minor, Op. 26 (1867)
  - Violin Concerto No. 2 in D minor, Op. 44 (1878)
  - Violin Concerto No. 3 in D minor, Op. 58 (1891)
- Joanna Bruzdowicz
  - Concerto for violin and orchestra No. 1 (1975)
- Hermann Buchal
  - Violin concerto Op. 69 (1941)
- Hans Bullerian
  - Violin concerto Op. 7
- Willy Burkhard
  - Violin Concerto, Op. 69 (1943)
- Britta Bystrom
  - Lyckans land, for violin and orchestra (2006)

=== C ===
- Édith Canat de Chizy
  - Concerto for violin and orchestra "Exultet" (1995)
- Elliott Carter
  - Violin Concerto (1990)
- Mario Castelnuovo-Tedesco
  - Concerto Italiano (1924)
  - Violin Concerto No. 2 (1931)
- Carlos Chávez
  - Violin Concerto (1950)
- Qigang Chen
  - La joie de la souffrance for Violin and Orchestra (2017)
- Gordon Chin
  - Violin Concerto No. 1(1998)
  - Formosa Seasons for Violin and Strings (2001)
  - Concerto for Violin, Cello, and Orchestra (2002)
  - Violin Concerto No. 2 (2003)
- Unsuk Chin
  - Violin Concerto No. 1 (2001)
  - Violin Concerto No. 2 (2021)
- Samuel Coleridge-Taylor
  - Violin Concerto Op. 80 (1912)
- Julius Conus
  - Violin Concerto in E minor (1898)
- Gloria Coates
  - Holographic Universe, for violin and orchestra (1975)
- Roque Cordero
  - Violin Concerto (1962)
- Guirne Creith (born Gladys Mary Cohen)
  - Concerto in G minor for violin and orchestra (1934)
- Paul Creston
  - Violin Concerto No. 1, Op. 65 (1956) Concerto for violin & orchestra, op. 65 Lydian ode, for orchestra, op. 67. Concerto for accordion, op. 75.
  - Violin Concerto No. 2, Op. 78 (1960)
- Zulema de la Cruz
  - Concerto for violin and chamber orchestra No. 1 "Pacifico" (2006)

=== D ===
- Michael Daugherty
  - Blue Electra for violin and orchestra (2022)
  - Fallingwater for violin and string orchestra (2013)
  - Fire and Blood for violin and orchestra (2003)
- Peter Maxwell Davies
  - Violin Concerto (1985)
  - Violin Concerto No. 2 Fiddler on the Shore (2009)
- Frederick Delius
  - Violin Concerto (1916)
- Yvonn Desportes
  - Caprice champetre, for violin and orchestra (1955)
- David Diamond
  - Violin Concerto No. 1 (1937)
  - Violin Concerto No. 2 (1947)
  - Violin Concerto No. 3 (1976)
- Mary Dickenson-Auner
  - Irish concerto for violin and orchestra
  - Concerto for violin and orchestra No. 2
- Albert Dietrich
  - Violin Concerto in D minor, Op. 30
- Charles Dieupart
  - Concerto in A major for violin, 2 oboes, bassoon, strings, and basso continuo
  - Concerto in B♭ major for 2 violins, 2 oboes, bassoon, strings, and basso continuo
- James Dillon
  - Violin Concerto (2000)
- Ernő Dohnányi
  - Violin Concerto No. 1 in D minor, Op. 27 (1915)
  - Violin Concerto No. 2 in C minor, Op. 43 (1949–50)
- Avner Dorman
  - Violin Concerto
  - Nigunim (Violin Concerto No. 2)
  - Still (Violin Concerto No. 3)
  - Double Concerto (for Violin and Cello)
- Zsolt Durkó
  - Violin Concerto
- Pascal Dusapin
  - Quad, 'In memoriam Gilles Deleuze', for violin and 15 musicians (1996)
  - Aufgang, violin concerto (2008-2011)
- Henri Dutilleux
  - L'arbre des songes – Violin Concerto (1985)
  - Sur un même accord – Nocturne for Violin and Orchestra (2002)
- Antonín Dvořák
  - Violin Concerto in A minor, Op. 53 (1879–80)

=== E ===
- Sophie Carmen Eckhardt-Gramatté
  - Violin Concerto for Solo Violin
- Danny Elfman
  - Concerto for Violin and Orchestra "Eleven Eleven" (2016-2017)
- Edward Elgar
  - Violin Concerto in B minor, Op. 61 (1910)
- Anders Eliasson
  - Violin Concerto Solitary Journey (2011; premiered by Ulf Wallin)
- Federico Elizalde
  - Violin Concerto (1944; premiered by Ginette Neveu)
- Jose Elizondo
  - La alborada de la esperanza (The Dawn of Hope) (2018)
  - Limoncello (2018)
  - Crepúsculos (Twilights) (2018)
- Heino Eller
  - Violin Concerto (1933, rev. 1965)
- Einar Englund
  - Violin Concerto (1981)
- Iván Erőd
  - Violin Concerto Op. 15 (1973)

=== F ===
- Sebastian Fagerlund
  - Violin Concerto Darkness in Light
- Johann Friedrich Fasch
  - Violin Concerto in A major, Fwv L:A 1
  - Violin Concerto in A major, Fwv L:A 2
  - Violin Concerto in A major, Fwv L:A 3
  - Violin Concerto in A minor, Fwv L:a 2
  - Violin Concerto in B♭ major, Fwv L:B 2
  - Violin Concerto in D major, Fwv L:D 2
  - Violin Concerto in D major, Fwv L:D 3
  - Violin Concerto in D major, Fwv L:D 4
  - Violin Concerto in D major, Fwv L:D 4a
  - Violin Concerto in D major, Fwv L:D 5
  - Violin Concerto in D major, Fwv L:D 6
  - Violin Concerto in D major. Fwv L:D 7
  - Violin Concerto in D major, Fwv L:D 8
  - Violin Concerto in F major, Fwv L:F 2
  - Concerto for violin, 2 flutes, 2 oboes, bassoon, strings, continuo in G major, Fwv L:G 4
  - Violin Concerto in G major, Fwv L:G 5
  - Violin Concerto in G major, Fwv L:G 6
  - Violin Concerto in G major, Fwv L:G 7
- Gabriel Fauré
  - Violin Concerto [unfinished] (1878–80); two of three movements were completed, the first survives
- Morton Feldman
  - Violin and Orchestra (1979)
- Jacobo Ficher
  - Concerto for violin and orchestra, Op. 46 (1942)
- Josef Bohuslav Foerster
  - Violin Concerto No. 1 in C minor, Op. 88 (1911)
  - Violin Concerto No. 2 in D minor, Op. 104
- Wolfgang Fortner
  - Concerto for Violin and Large Chamber Orchestra (1947)
- Eduard Franck
  - Violin Concerto No. 1 in E minor, Op. 30 (1855/1861, printed 1890)
  - Violin Concerto No. 2 in D major, Op. 57 (1875)
  - Konzertstück for Violin and Orchestra in A major (1845)
- Richard Franck
  - Violin Concerto in D major, Op. 43 (1906)
  - Serenade for Violin and Orchestra in A major, Op. 25 (1896)
- Benjamin Frankel
  - Violin Concerto (1951)
- Peter Fribbins
  - Concerto for Violin and Orchestra (2014–15)

=== G ===
- Niels Gade
  - Violin Concerto in D minor, Op. 56 (1880)
- Blas Galindo
  - Violin Concerto (1962)
- Raymond Gallois-Montbrun
  - Violin Concerto (1957)
- Chen Gang and He Zhanhao
  - Butterfly Lovers' Violin Concerto
- Philippe Gaubert
  - Violin Concerto in B♭ major (1929)
- Harald Genzmer
  - Concerto for Violin (1959)
- Roberto Gerhard
  - Violin Concerto (1945, rev. 1950)
- Friedrich Gernsheim
  - Violin Concerto No. 1 in D major, Op. 42
  - Violin Concerto No. 2 in F major, Op. 86
- Alberto Ginastera
  - Violin Concerto (1963)
- Philip Glass
  - Violin Concerto No. 1 (1987)
  - Violin Concerto No. 2 (2009)
- Alexander Glazunov
  - Violin Concerto in A minor, Op. 82 (1904)
- Benjamin Godard
  - Concerto Romantique, Op. 35
  - Concerto No. 2, Op. 131
- Hermann Goetz
  - Violin Concerto in G major, Op. 22
- Karel Goeyvaerts
  - Violin Concerto No. 1 (1948)
  - Violin Concerto No. 2 (1951)
- Karl Goldmark
  - Violin Concerto No. 1 in A minor, Op. 28 (1877)
  - Violin Concerto No. 2 ?
- Berthold Goldschmidt
  - Violin Concerto (1952/55)
- Evgeny Golubev
  - Violin Concerto, Op. 56 (1970)
- Paul Graener
  - Violin Concerto, Op. 104 (1938)
- Kurt Graunke
  - Violin Concerto (1959)
- Helen Grime
  - Violin Concerto (2016)
- Camargo Guarnieri
  - Violin Concerto No. 1 (1940)
  - Violin Concerto No. 2 (1952)
- Sofia Gubaidulina
  - Offertorium, concerto for violin and orchestra (1980–86)
  - In tempus praesens, concerto for violin and orchestra (2006–07)
- César Guerra-Peixe
  - Concertino for violin and chamber orchestra (1972)

=== H ===
- Reynaldo Hahn
  - Violin Concerto in D major (1928)
- Alexei Haieff
  - Violin Concerto (1948)
- Johann David Heinichen
  - Violin Concerto in D major, S.224
- Cristóbal Halffter
  - Violin Concerto No. 1 (1979)
  - Violin Concerto No. 2 (1990–91)
- Rodolfo Halffter
  - Violin Concerto Op. 11 (1940)
- Hafliði Hallgrímsson
  - Poemi, Violin Concerto (1986)
- Iain Hamilton
  - Violin Concerto, Op. 15
  - Amphion – Concerto No. 2 for violin and orchestra (1971)
- Georg Friedrich Händel
  - Violin Concerto in B♭ major, HWV 288 (ca. 1707)
- John Harbison
  - Violin Concerto (1980/87)
- Roy Harris
  - Violin Concerto (1950)
- Lou Harrison
  - Concerto for Violin with Percussion Orchestra (1940–74)
- Karl Amadeus Hartmann
  - Concerto funebre for violin and string orchestra (1939)
- Hamilton Harty
  - Violin Concerto (1908)
- Joseph Haydn
  - Violin Concerto No. 1 in C major, Hob. VIIa:1 (ca. 1765)
  - Violin Concerto No. 2 in D major, Hob. VIIa:2 (1765, lost)
  - Violin Concerto No. 3 in A major, Hob. VIIa:3 "Melker Konzert" (ca. 1770)
  - Violin Concerto No. 4 in G major, Hob. VIIa:4 (1769)
- Hans Henkemans
  - Violin Concerto (1950)
- Hans Werner Henze
  - Violin Concerto No. 1 (1947)
  - Violin Concerto No. 2 "Hommage à Gödel" (1971, revised 1991)
  - Violin Concerto No. 3 "Three Portraits from T. Mann's Doktor Faustus" (1996)
- Kenneth Hesketh
  - Inscription-Transformation for Violin and Orchestra (2015)
- Paul Hindemith
  - Violin Concerto (1939)
- Jennifer Higdon
  - Violin Concerto (2008)
- Edward Burlingame Hill
  - Violin Concerto
- Ferdinand Hiller
  - Violin Concerto, Op. 152a (1871)
- Alistair Hinton
  - Violin Concerto (1979)
- Robin Holloway
  - Violin Concerto, Op. 70 (1990)
- Vagn Holmboe
  - Chamber Concerto No. 6 for Violin (1943)
  - Violin Concerto (1979?)
- Gustav Holst
  - Double Concerto (1929)
- Simon Holt
  - witness to a snow miracle (2005)
- Alan Hovhaness
  - Concerto No. 2 (Violin Concerto No. 1) for violin and strings, Op. 89, No. 1 (1951; rev. 1957)
  - Violin Concerto No. 2, Op. 431 (1993)
- Jenő Hubay
  - Violin Concerto No. 1 (Concerto dramatique) in A minor, Op. 21 (1884)
  - Violin Concerto No. 2 in E major, Op. 90 (1900)
  - Violin Concerto No. 3 in G minor, Op. 99 (1906–1907)
  - Violin Concerto No. 4 (Concerto all' antica) in A minor, Op. 101 (1907)

=== I ===
- Toshi Ichiyanagi
  - Violin Concerto "Circulating Scenery" (1983)
- Shin-ichiro Ikebe
  - Violin Concerto (1981)
- Maki Ishii
  - Lost Sounds III – Violin Concerto (1978)
- Jānis Ivanovs
  - Violin Concerto (1951)

=== J ===
- David A. Jaffe
  - Violin Concerto "How Did It Get So Late So Soon?", for violin and orchestra or chamber orchestra (2016)
  - Violin Concerto "Bristlecone Concerto", for violin and chamber orchestra (1984)
  - Double Concerto for violin, mandolin and orchestra or chamber orchestra "Would You Just As Soon Sing As Make That Noise?!" (1983)
- Leoš Janáček

(1927)

- Joseph Joachim
  - Violin Concerto No. 1 in G minor, Op. 3 (1851), in one movement, dedicated to Franz Liszt
  - Violin Concerto No. 2 in D minor "in the Hungarian manner", Op. 11 (1861)
  - Violin Concerto No. 3 in G major, WoO (1875)
- David Johnstone
  - The Four Seasons, for Violin solo and string orchestra (pub. 2008)
  - Rhapsody Concertante (on Hungarian and Rumanian themes) for Violin solo and string orchestra (pub. 2008)
  - Poema de amor, for Violin solo and string orchestra (pub.2007)
- André Jolivet
  - Violin Concerto (1972)

=== K ===
- Dmitri Kabalevsky
  - Violin Concerto in C major, Op. 48 (1948)
- Jan Kalivoda
  - One concerto, a fantasy and six concertinos for violin and orchestra
- Romualds Kalsons
  - Violin Concerto (1978)
- Mieczysław Karłowicz
  - Violin Concerto in A major, Op. 8 (1902)
- Shigeru Kan-no
  - 2 Violin Concertos
- Talivaldis Kenins
  - Violin Concerto (1974)
- Aaron Jay Kernis
  - Violin Concerto (2017)
- Tristan Keuris
  - Violin Concerto No. 1 (1984)
  - Violin Concerto No. 2 (1995)
- Aram Khachaturian
  - Violin Concerto in D minor, Op. 46 (1940)
  - Concerto-Rhapsody in B♭ minor, Op. 96 (1961)
- Oliver Knussen
  - Violin Concerto, Op. 30 (2002)
- Erich Wolfgang Korngold
  - Violin Concerto in D major, Op. 35 (1945)
- Božidar Kos
  - Violin Concerto (1986)
- Fritz Kreisler
  - Violin Concerto in C major "in the style of Vivaldi"
- Franz Krommer
  - 12 violin concertos (opp. 20, 41, 42, 43, 44, 61, 64, 81 and four without opus number—alternatively Padrta (P) III:1, 6–9, 13–15, C1, F1, F2 and G1)
- Branimir Krstic
  - horses and dolphins unstuck in time (2008)
- Hanna Kulenty
  - Violin Concerto No. 1 [version for chamber orchestra] [version for chamber orchestra](1992) [version for large orchestra] (1993)
  - Violin Concerto No. 2 (1996)

=== L ===
- José White Lafitte
  - Violin Concerto in F♯ minor (1864)
- Édouard Lalo
  - Violin Concerto in F major, Op. 20 (1874)
  - Symphonie Espagnole
  - Concerto russe in G minor, Op. 29 (1879)
- Lars-Erik Larsson
  - Violin Concerto, Op. 42 (1952)
- Henri Lazarof
  - Concerto for Violin (1986)
  - Violin Concerto No. 3 'Edinger', (2003)
- Jean-Marie Leclair
  - Six Violin Concertos, Op. 7, in D minor, D major, C major, F major, A minor, and A major
  - Six Violin Concertos, Op. 10, in B♭ major, A major, D major, F major, E minor, and G major
- Benjamin Lees
  - Violin Concerto (1958)
- Ulrich Leyendecker
  - Violin Concerto (1995)
- Lowell Liebermann
  - Concerto for Violin and Orchestra Op. 74 (2001)
- György Ligeti
  - Violin Concerto (1989–92)
- Magnus Lindberg
  - Violin Concerto No. 1 (2006)
  - Violin Concerto No. 2 (2015)
- Bo Linde
  - Concerto for Violin, Op. 18 (1957)
- Karol Lipiński 1790 - 1861
  - I Violin Concerto F♯ minor Op. 14
  - II Violin Concerto (militare) D major Op. 21
  - III Violin Concerto E minor, Op. 24
  - IV Violin Concerto A major, Op. 32
- Andrew List
  - Violin Concerto (2004)
- George Lloyd
  - Concerto for violin and winds (1970)
  - Concerto for violin and strings (1977)
- Mihovil Logar
  - Violin Concerto
- Thomas Ludwig
  - Concerto for Violin and Orchestra (1989)
- Witold Lutosławski
  - Chain II, dialogue for violin and orchestra (1984–85)
  - Partita, for violin and orchestra (1988)
  - Violin Concerto (1994) (fragments only)

=== M ===
- Aleksi Machavariani
  - Concerto for violin and symphony orchestra (1949)
- Otmar Mácha
  - Violin Concerto (1986)
- James MacMillan
  - Violin Concerto (2009)
- Bruno Maderna
  - Violin Concerto (1969)
- Stuart MacRae
  - Violin Concerto (2001)
- Joan Magrané Figuera
  - L'or de l'azur, Violin Concerto (2021)
- Gian Francesco Malipiero
  - Violin Concerto No. 1 (1932)
  - Violin Concerto No. 2 (1963)
- Ljubica Marić
  - Asymptote for violin and string orchestra (1986)
- Tomás Marco
  - Violin Concerto (1971)
  - Concierto del alma for violin and string orchestra (1987)
- Frank Martin
  - Violin Concerto (1950–51)
  - Polyptyque, Concerto for Violin and Double String Orchestra (1973)
- Jean Martinon
  - Violin Concerto No. 2 (1958, rev. 1960)
- Bohuslav Martinů
  - Violin Concerto No. 1 (1943)
  - Violin Concerto No. 2 (1944–45)
  - Concerto for Two Violins and Orchestra (1950)
- Tauno Marttinen
  - Violin Concerto, Op. 13 (1962)
- Karl Marx
  - Concert for Two Violins and Orchestra
- Nicholas Maw
  - Violin Concerto (1993)
- Missy Mazzoli
  - Violin Concerto (2021)
- George Frederick McKay
  - Concerto for Violin (1942)
- Erkki Melartin
  - Concerto for Violin and Orchestra (1913)
- Felix Mendelssohn
  - Violin Concerto in D minor (1822)
  - Violin Concerto in E minor, Op. 64 (1844)
- Aarre Merikanto
  - Violin Concerto No. 2 (1925)
- Edgar Meyer
  - Violin Concerto (1999)
- Krzysztof Meyer
  - Violin Concerto No. 1 (1965)
  - Violin Concerto No. 2 (1996)
- Ernst Hermann Meyer
  - Violin Concerto (1964)
- Gian Carlo Menotti
  - Violin Concerto (1952)
- Francisco Mignone
  - Violin Concerto (1960)
- András Mihály
  - Violin Concerto (1961)
- Darius Milhaud
  - Violin Concerto No. 1 (1927)
  - Violin Concertos No. 2 (1946)
  - Violin Concertos No. 3 (1958)
- Emil Młynarski
  - Violin concerto in D minor, Op. 11 (ca. 1897)
  - Violin concerto in D major, Op. 16 (ca. 1916)
- Ernest John Moeran
  - Violin Concerto (1942)
- Richard Mohaupt
  - Concerto for Violin and Orchestra (1945)
- Moritz Moszkowski
  - Violin Concerto in C major, Op. 30 (1885)
- Alexander Moyzes
  - Violin Concerto (1958)
- Wolfgang Amadeus Mozart
  - Violin Concerto No. 1 in B♭ major, K. 207 (1773), with alternative Rondo in B♭, K.269/261a (added 1775-1777)
  - Violin Concerto No. 2 in D major, K. 211 (1775)
  - Violin Concerto No. 3 in G major, K. 216, Strassburg (1775)
  - Violin Concerto No. 4 in D major, K. 218 (1775)
  - Violin Concerto No. 5 in A major, K. 219, Turkish (1775) with alternative Adagio in E, K.261 (added 1776)
  - Violin Concerto No. 6 in E♭ major, K. 268 (Attributed to Johann Friedrich Eck, 1780–81)
  - Violin Concerto No. 7 in D major, K. 271a, Kolb (Doubtful, 1777)
  - Adélaïde Concerto (Forgery by Marius Casadesus, 1933)
- Nikolai Myaskovsky
  - Violin Concerto in D minor, Op. 44 (1938)

=== N ===
- Pietro Nardini
  - Violin Concerto in E major
- Teodor Nicolau
  - Poème Concertante, Op. 12
- Carl Nielsen
  - Violin Concerto, Op. 33 (1911)
- Serge Nigg
  - Violin Concerto No. 1 (1957)
- Pehr Henrik Nordgren
  - Concerto for Violin No. 1 (1969)
  - Concerto for Violin No. 2, Op. 33 (1977)
  - Concerto for Violin No. 3, Op. 53 (1981)
  - Concerto for Violin No. 4, Op. 90, (1994)
- Per Nørgård
  - Violin Concerto No. 1 'Helle Nacht' (1987)
  - Violin Concerto No. 2 'Borderlines' (2002)
- Ib Nørholm
  - Violin Concerto (1975)

=== O ===
- Aleksandar Obradović
  - Concerto for Violin and String Orchestra (1991)
- Mark O'Connor
  - Fiddle Concerto (1993)
  - Double Violin Concerto (1997)
- Claus Ogerman
  - Violin Concerto (1982)
- Hiroshi Ohguri
  - Violin Concerto (1963)
- Gabriela Ortiz
  - Altar de Cuerda (2021)
- Slavko Osterc
  - Concerto for Violin and 7 Instruments (1928)

=== P ===
- Niccolò Paganini
  - Violin Concerto No. 1 in D major, Op. 6, MS 21 (ca. 1811–17)
  - Violin Concerto No. 2 in B minor, Op. 7, MS 48, La Campanella (1826)
  - Violin Concerto No. 3 in E major, MS 50 (ca. 1826–30)
  - Violin Concerto No. 4 in D minor, MS 60 (ca. 1829–30)
  - Violin Concerto No. 5 in A minor, MS 78 (1830)
  - Violin Concerto No. 6 in E minor, Op. posth., MS 75—probably the first to be written; only the solo part survives
- Andrzej Panufnik
  - Violin Concerto (1971)
- Boris Papandopulo
  - Violin Concerto (1943)
- Arvo Pärt
  - Tabula Rasa—Double Concerto for two violins, string orchestra, and prepared piano (1977)
- Helmers Pavasars
  - Violin Concerto
- Krzysztof Penderecki
  - Violin Concerto No. 1 (1977)
  - Violin Concerto No. 2 'Metamorphosen' (1992–93)
- Giovanni Battista Pergolesi
  - Violin Concerto in B♭ major
- Wilhelm Peterson-Berger
  - Violin Concerto (1928)
- Allan Pettersson
  - Violin Concerto No. 1 (for violin and string quartet) (1949)
  - Violin Concerto No. 2 (1977–78, rev. 1980)
- Hans Pfitzner
  - Violin Concerto in B minor, Op. 34 (1923)
- Willem Pijper
  - Violin Concerto (1938–39)
- Walter Piston
  - Violin Concerto No. 1 (1939)
  - Violin Concerto No. 2 (1960)
- Ildebrando Pizzetti
  - Violin Concerto (1944)
- Manuel Maria Ponce
  - Violin Concerto (1943)
- Gundaris Pone
  - Violin Concerto (1959)
- André Previn
  - Violin Concerto "Anne-Sophie" (2001)
- Sergei Prokofiev
  - Violin Concerto No. 1 in D major, Op. 19 (1917)
  - Violin Concerto No. 2 in G minor, Op. 63 (1935)

=== R ===
- Robin de Raaff
  - Violin Concerto No. 1 "Angelic Echoes" (2008)
  - Violin Concerto No. 2 "North Atlantic Light" (2018)
- Luis Felipe Ramírez Santillán
  - Violin Concerto and solo voices, (2017–18)
- Nikolai Rakov
  - Violin Concerto No. 1 E minor (1944)
  - Violin Concerto No. 2 A minor (1954)
- Einojuhani Rautavaara
  - Violin Concerto (1976–77)
- Alan Rawsthorne
  - Concerto for Violin No. 1 (1948)
  - Concerto for Violin No. 2 (1956)
- Max Reger
  - Violin Concerto in A major, Op. 101 (1907–08)
- Carl Reinecke
  - Violin Concerto in G minor, Op. 141 (1876)
- Ottorino Respighi
  - Violin Concerto in A major (1903, unfinished)
  - Concerto gregoriano (1921)
- Ferdinand Ries
  - Violin Concerto in E minor, Op. 24 (1810)
- Wolfgang Rihm
  - Violin Concerto, Op. 14 (1991–92)
- Knudåge Riisager
  - Violin Concerto in a minor, Op. 54 (1950–51)
- Milan Ristić
  - Violin Concerto (1944)
- George Rochberg
  - Violin Concerto (1974, rev. 2001)
- Pierre Rode
  - Thirteen violin concertos
- Joaquín Rodrigo
  - Concierto de estío (1944)
- Alessandro Rolla
  - 49 Works for violin and orchestra, including 21 concertos, and 28 shorter works
  - 2 Concertos for 2 violins
- Julius Röntgen
  - Violin Concerto in A minor (1902)
  - Violin Concerto in D major (1925/26)
  - Violin Concerto in F♯ minor (1931)
- Amanda Röntgen-Maier
  - Violin Concerto in D minor in one movement (1875)
- Ned Rorem
  - Violin Concerto (1984)
- Hilding Rosenberg
  - Violin Concerto No. 1 (1924)
  - Violin Concerto No. 2 (1951)
- Nikolai Roslavets
  - Violin Concerto (1925)
- Christopher Rouse
  - Violin Concerto (1991)
- Miklós Rózsa
  - Violin Concerto, Op. 24 (1956)
- Ludomir Różycki
  - Violin Concerto (1944)
- Edmund Rubbra
  - Violin Concerto, Op. 103 (1959)
- Anton Rubinstein
  - Violin Concerto in G major, Op. 46
- Poul Ruders
  - Violin Concerto No. 1 (1981)
  - Violin Concerto No. 2 (1991–92)

=== S ===
- P. Peter Sacco
  - Concerto for Violin No. 1 (1969)
- Harald Sæverud
  - Violin Concerto Op. 37 (1957)
- Chevalier de Saint-Georges
  - About twenty-five violin concertos
- Camille Saint-Saëns
  - Violin Concerto No. 1 in A major, Op. 20 (1859)
  - Violin Concerto No. 2 in C major, Op. 58 (1858)
  - Violin Concerto No. 3 in B minor, Op. 61 (1880)
- Prosper Sainton
  - Concerto no. 1, Op. 9 (ca 1851)
- Aulis Sallinen
  - Violin Concerto, Op. 18 (1968)
- Ignacio Salvo
  - Double Violin Concerto (2014–15)
- Ahmet Adnan Saygun
  - Violin Concerto (1967)
- Alfred Schnittke
  - Violin Concerto No. 1 (1957, rev. 1966)
  - Violin Concerto No. 2 (1966)
  - Violin Concerto No. 3 (1978)
  - Violin Concerto No. 4 (1984)
- Othmar Schoeck
  - Violin Concerto in B♭ major, Opus 21 (1912)
- Arnold Schoenberg
  - Violin Concerto (1936)
- Gunther Schuller
  - Concerto for Violin No. 1 (1976)
  - Concerto for Violin No. 2 (1991)
- William Schuman
  - Violin Concerto (1947, rev. 1956 & 1959)
- Robert Schumann
  - Violin Concerto in D minor (1853)
- Ernest Schuyten
  - Violin Concerto (1930s)
- Laura Schwendinger
  - Chiaroscuro Azzurro (2007)
- Cyril Scott
  - Violin Concerto
- Tibor Serly
  - Concerto for Violin and Wind Symphony (1958–59)
- Roger Sessions
  - Violin Concerto in B minor (1935)
- Zdeněk Šesták
  - Violin concerto "Sursum corda" (1981) (wind, harp, celesta, gong and kettledrums accompaniment)
- Tolib Shahidi
  - Concerto for Violin and Chamber Orchestra (1993)
- Rodion Shchedrin
  - Concerto Cantabile (1998)
- Vissorion Shebalin
  - Violin Concerto, Op. 21 (1936–40, 1959)
- Noam Sheriff
  - Violin Concerto (1986)
- Dmitri Shostakovich
  - Violin Concerto No. 1 in A minor, Op. 77 (1948, rev. 1955 as Op. 99)
  - Violin Concerto No. 2 in C♯ minor, Op. 129 (1967)
- Aleksandr Shymko
  - Violin concerto (2012)
- Jean Sibelius
  - Violin Concerto in D minor, Op. 47 (1904)
- Robert Simpson
  - Violin Concerto (1959) (withdrawn)
- Christian Sinding
  - Violin Concerto No. 1 in A major, Op. 45 (1898)
  - Violin Concerto No. 2 in D major, Op. 60 (published by 1901)
  - Violin Concerto No. 3, Op. 119 (1917)
- Maddalena Laura Sirmen
  - Six Violin Concerti
- Nikos Skalkottas
  - Violin Concerto (1938)
- Lucijan Marija Škerjanc
  - Violin Concerto (1944)
- Dane Škerl
  - Violin Concerto (1984)
- Yngve Sköld
  - Violin Concerto (1941)
- Myroslav Skoryk
  - Violin Concerto (1971)
- David Stanley Smith
  - Violin Concerto No. 1 in F major, opus 69 (before 1934)
  - Violin Concerto No. 2 in G major, opus 86 (before 1943)
- Arthur Somervell
  - Violin Concerto in G minor (1930)
- Vladimír Sommer
  - Violin Concerto (1950)
- Leo Sowerby
  - Violin Concerto in G major (1913, rev. 1924)
- Louis Spohr
  - 15 violin concertos and other works for violin and orchestra
- Charles Villiers Stanford
  - Violin Concerto in D major, Opus 74 (1899)
  - Violin Concerto in G minor, Opus 162 (1918)
- Robert Starer
  - Violin Concerto (1979–80)
- Ronald Stevenson
  - Violin Concerto "The Gypsy" (1977–79)
- Josip Štolcer-Slavenski
  - Violin Concerto (1927)
- Oscar Strasnoy
  - "Automaton", for solo violin and chamber orchestra (2016)
- Richard Strauss
  - Violin Concerto (1881–82)
- Igor Stravinsky
  - Violin Concerto (1931)
- Stjepan Šulek
  - Violin Concerto (1951)
- Hermann Suter
  - Violin Concerto (1924)
- Margaret Sutherland
  - Violin Concerto (1954)
- Johann Severin Svendsen
  - Violin Concerto Op. 6 (1868–70)
- Tomáš Svoboda
  - Violin Concerto, Op. 77 (1975)
- Karol Szymanowski
  - Violin Concerto No. 1, Op. 35 (1916)
  - Violin Concerto No. 2, Op. 61 (1933)

=== T ===
- Otar Taktakishvili
  - Violin Concerto No. 2 (1987)
- Eino Tamberg
  - Violin Concerto (1981)
- Bernard Tan
  - Violin Concerto (2005)
- Giuseppe Tartini
  - Over 130 violin concertos (Istria on the Internet - Prominent Istrians - Giuseppe Tartini)
- Alexander Tchaikovsky
  - Violin Concerto (1987)
- Pyotr Ilyich Tchaikovsky
  - Violin Concerto in D major, Op. 35 (1878)
- Georg Philipp Telemann
  - Violin Concerto in A major "Die Relinge" TWV 51:A4
  - Violin Concerto in B♭ major ("Concerto grosso, per il Sigr. Pisendel") TWV 51:B1
  - Concerto for Two Violins and Strings in C major TWV52:C2
  - Concerto for Two Violins and Strings in D major TWV52:D3
  - Concerto for Two Violins and Strings in E minor TWV52:e4
  - Concerto for Two Violins and Strings in G major TWV52:G2
  - Concerto for Two Violins and Strings in G minor TWV52:g1
  - Concerto for Two Violins and Strings in A major TWV52:A2
  - Concerto for Two Violins and Strings in B♭ major TWV52:B2
  - Concerto for Three Violins in F major, TWV 53:F1
  - Concerto for Four Violins in A major, 54:A 1
- Alicia Terzian
  - Concerto for Violin and Orchestra Op. 7 in D minor (1956)
- Augusta Read Thomas
  - Spirit Musings—Concerto for violin and orchestra (1997)
  - Cello Concerto No. 2—Ritual Incantations (1999)
  - Violin Concerto No. 3—Juggler in Paradise (2008)
- Leifur þórarinsson
  - Violin Concerto (1969–70)
- Boris Tishchenko
  - Violin Concerto No. 2
  - Violin Concerto (2011)
- Joan Tower
  - Violin Concerto (1992)
- Vitomir Trifunović
  - Violin Concerto (1976)
- Eduard Tubin
  - Violin Concerto No. 1 (1941–42)
  - Violin Concerto No. 2 (1945)

=== V ===
- Fartein Valen
  - Violin Concerto (1940)
- Nancy Van de Vate
  - Violin concerto No. 1 (1986)
- David Van Vactor
  - Violin Concerto (1951)
- Pēteris Vasks
  - Violin Concerto 'Distant Light' (1996–97)
- Ralph Vaughan Williams
  - Violin Concerto in D minor, "Concerto Accademico"
- Carlos Veerhoff
  - Violin Concerto No. 1 Op. 40 (1976)
  - Violin Concerto No. 2 Op. 69 (1992)
- Joseph Vella
  - Violin Concerto (1993)
- Francesco Maria Veracini
  - Concerto a cinque in A major, for violin, strings, and continuo
  - Concerto a cinque in D major, for violin, strings, and continuo
  - Concerto a otto strumenti in D major, for violin solo, two trumpets, two oboes, strings, and continuo (1711)
- Henri Vieuxtemps
  - Violin Concerto No. 1 in E major, Op. 10 (1840)
  - Violin Concerto No. 2 in F♯ minor, Op. 19 (ca. 1835–36)
  - Violin Concerto No. 3 in A major, Op. 25 (1844)
  - Violin Concerto No. 4 in D minor, Op. 31 (ca. 1850)
  - Violin Concerto No. 5 in A minor, Op. 37, Grétry (1861)
  - Violin Concerto No. 6 in G major, Op. 47/Op. posth. 1 (1865–1870)
  - Violin Concerto No. 7 in A minor, Op. 49/Op. posth. 3
- Giovanni Battista Viotti—twenty-nine violin concertos, particularly:
  - Violin Concerto No. 22 in A minor (1792)
- Antonio Vivaldi—many, particularly:
  - L'estro armonico, Op. 3 (1711)—twelve concertos
  - The Four Seasons (ca. 1725) —four concertos, the first four numbers of Il cimento dell'armonia e dell'inventione, Op. 8
  - Concerto in D major "Grosso Mogul", RV 208
- Pancho Vladigerov
  - Violin Concerto No. 1 (1921)
- Wladimir Vogel
  - Violin Concerto (1937)
- Pavel Vranický
  - Violin Concertos in C, D, F and G

=== W ===
- William Walton
  - Violin Concerto (1939)
- Robert Ward
  - Concerto for violin and orchestra (1993, revised 1994)
- Kurt Weill
  - Concerto for Violin and Wind Orchestra, Op. 12 (1924)
- Mieczysław Weinberg
  - Violin Concerto, Op. 67 (1959)
- Egon Wellesz
  - Violin Concerto, Op. 84 (1961)
- Richard Wetz
  - Violin Concerto in B minor, Op. 57 (1933)
- Jörg Widmann
  - Violin Concerto (2007)
  - Violin Concerto No. 2 (2018)
- Henryk Wieniawski
  - Violin Concerto No. 1 in F♯ minor, Op. 14 (1853)
  - Violin Concerto No. 2 in D minor, Op. 22 (1862)
- John Williams
  - Violin Concerto No. 1 (1974–76, rev. 1998)
  - Violin Concerto No. 2 (2021)
- Richard Edward Wilson
  - Concerto for Violin and Chamber Orchestra (1979)
- Hugh Wood
  - Violin Concerto No. 1, Op. 17 (1970–72)
  - Violin Concerto No. 2, Op. 50 (2003–2004)
- John Woolrich
  - Violin Concerto (2008)
- Charles Wuorinen
  - Concerto for violin and orchestra (1958)
  - Concerto for amplified violin and orchestra (1972)

=== Y ===
- Chen Yi
  - Violin concerto "Spring in Dresden" (2005)

=== Z ===
- Riccardo Zandonai
  - Concerto romantico for violin and orchestra
- Hermann Zilcher
  - Concerto No. 1 in B minor for violin and small orchestra, Op. 11
  - Violin Concerto No. 2 in A major, Op. 92 (1942)
  - Concerto for 2 violins and orchestra in D minor, Op. 9
- Bernd Alois Zimmermann
  - Violin Concerto (1950)
- Ellen Taaffe Zwilich
  - Violin Concerto No. 1 (1997)
  - Partita (Concerto No. 2) for violin and string orchestra (2000)
  - Commedia dell'Arte (Violin Concerto No. 3) for violin and string orchestra (2012)

== Other concertante works for violin and orchestra ==
- Gilbert Amy
  - Trajectoires, for violin and orchestra (1966)
- Louis Andriessen
  - La Girò, for violin and ensemble (2011)
- Béla Bartók
  - One Ideal, Op. 5/1 (1907–10)
  - One Grotesque, Op. 5/2 (1907–10)
  - Rhapsody No. 1 (1928)
  - Rhapsody No. 2 (1928)
- Ludwig van Beethoven
  - Romance No. 1 in G major, Op. 40 (1798–1802)
  - Romance No. 2 in F major, Op. 50 (1798–1802)
- Luciano Berio
  - Corale for violin, two horns, and strings (1981)
- Hector Berlioz
  - Reverie et Caprice, Op. 8 (1841)
- Leonard Bernstein
  - Serenade after Plato's "Symposium"(1954)
- Nimrod Borenstein
  - "Poème" for violon solo and string orchestra Op. 64 (2013)
- Max Bruch
  - Romance in A minor, Op. 42 (1874)
  - Scottish Fantasy in E♭ major, Op. 46 (1880)
  - Adagio Appassionato in C♯ minor, Op. 57 (1890)
  - Schwedische Tanze, Op. 63/2 (1892)
  - In memoriam, Op. 65 (1893)
  - Serenade in A minor, Op. 75 (1899–1900)
  - Konzertstück in F♯ minor, Op. 84 (ca. 1911)
- Ernest Chausson
  - Poème, Op. 25 (1896)
- Chen Yi
  - Chinese Folk Dance Suite for Violin and Orchestra (2000)
  - Romance and Dance for 2 Violins and String Orchestra (1995/1998)
- Henry Cowell
  - Air, HC 767/1a (1952)
  - Fiddler's Jig, HC 771, Flirtatious Jig (1952)
- César Cui
  - Suite concertante, Op. 25 (1884)
- Luigi Dallapiccola
  - Tartiniana (1951)
  - Tartiniana seconda (1955–56)
- Frederick Delius
  - Suite for violin and orchestra (1888)
  - Légende (1895)
- Alphons Diepenbrock
  - Hymne (1917)
- Antonín Dvořák
  - Romance in F minor, Op. 11 (1877)
  - Mazurek, Op. 49 (1879)
- George Enescu
  - Ballade, for violin and orchestra (1895)
  - Caprice Roumain, for violin and orchestra (1928, unfinished; completed by Cornel Țăranu)
- Jacobo Ficher
  - Three Pieces for violin and orchestra, Op. 65 (1948)
- Philip Glass
  - Echorus for two violins and string orchestra (1995)
- Alexander Glazunov
  - Mazurka-Oberek in D major, Op. 100b (1917)
- Lou Harrison
  - Koncherto for violin and percussion ensemble (1959)
  - Music for Violin and Various Instruments, European, Asian, and African (1967–69)
  - Suite for Violin and American Gamelan (1974; arr. for violin and string orchestra, 1993)
  - Philemon and Baukis for violin and Javanese gamelan (1985–87)
- Hamilton Harty
  - Variations on a Dublin Air, for violin and orchestra (1912)
- Victor Herbert
  - Fantasia on Cavalleria rusticana (Mascagni) for violin and orchestra (1893)
- Ferdinand Hiller
  - Violin Concerto/Fantasiestück Opus 152 (published by Forberg, 1870s, before 1876) (Koninklijke Bibliotheek of the Hague, University of Rochester Voyager Catalog which notes that it is dedicated to Eugène Ysaÿe)
- Paul Hindemith
  - Kammermusik No. 4 (Violin Concerto), Op. 36, No. 3 (1925)
- Robin Holloway
  - Romanza for violin and small orchestra, Op. 31 (1976)
- Alan Hovhaness
  - Ode to Freedom for violin and orchestra, Op. 284
- Joseph Joachim
  - Notturno in A major, Op. 12 (1858)
  - Andantino in A minor
  - Variations in E minor
- Aaron Jay Kernis
  - Air (1996; orig. for violin and piano, 1995)
  - Lament and Prayer (1996)
- Édouard Lalo
  - Symphonie Espagnole, Op. 21 (1874)
- André Laporte
  - Fantasia-Rondino con tema reale, for violin and orchestra (1988)
- Witold Lutosławski
  - Chain II (1984–85)
  - Partita for Violin and Orchestra (1988; orig. for violin and piano, 1984)
- Alexander Mackenzie
  - Pibroch Suite, Op. 42 (version for violin and orchestra) (premiered 1889, ded. Sarasate)
- Otto Malling
  - Concert Fantasy (first perf. 1884)
- Tomás Marco
  - Les mécanismes de la mémoire, for violin and orchestra (1973)
- Bohuslav Martinů
  - Duo Concertant for Two Violins and Orchestra (1937)
- Jules Massenet
  - Meditation from Thaïs (1894) (often programmed as a standalone piece)
- John Blackwood McEwen
  - Scottish Fantasy "Prince Charlie" (1941 orchestration of a 1915 violin and piano work)
- Fred Momotenko
  - To the Silence, for string orchestra (2015)
- Wolfgang Amadeus Mozart
  - Concertone in C major, for two violins and orchestra, K. 190 (1774)
  - Rondo in B♭ major, K. 269/261a (1775-1777)
  - Adagio in E major, K. 261 (1776)
  - Rondo in C major, K. 373 (1781)
- Oskar Nedbal
  - 2 pieces, Op. 6 (1893)
    1. Romance
    2. Serenade
- Arvo Pärt
  - Fratres for violin, string orchestra, and percussion (1992)
  - Darf ich... for violin, bells, and string orchestra (1995/1999)
- Walter Piston
  - Fantasia (1970)
- Nikolai Rakov
  - Concertino in D minor for violin and string orchestra (1960)
- Maurice Ravel
  - Tzigane (1924)
- Steve Reich
  - Duet for Two Violins and String Orchestra (1993)
- Wolfgang Rihm
  - Coll'arco
  - Gesungene Zeit
  - Lichtes Spiel
- Nikolai Rimsky-Korsakov
  - Fantasy on Two Russian Themes, for violin and orchestra, Op. 33, 1886–87
  - Mazurka on [Three] Polish Folk Themes, for violin and orchestra, 1888; also called Souvenir de trois chants polonais
- Julius Röntgen
  - Suite D minor for Violin and Strings (1892)
  - Ballade (1918)
- Camille Saint-Saëns
  - Introduction and Rondo Capriccioso in A minor, Op. 28 (1863)
  - Romance in D♭ major, Op. 37 (1871)
  - Romance in C major, Op. 48 (1874)
  - Morceau de concert in G major, Op. 62 (1880)
  - Havanaise in E major, Op. 83 (1887)
  - Caprice andalous in G major, Op. 122 (1904)
- Pablo de Sarasate
  - Zigeunerweisen, Op. 20 (1878)
  - Carmen Fantasy, Op. 25 (1883)
  - Navarra for two violins and orchestra, Op. 33 (1889)
  - Miramar-Zortzico, Op. 42 (1899)
  - Introduction and Tarantella, Op. 43 (1899)
- Giacinto Scelsi
  - Anahit (1965)
- R. Murray Schafer
  - The Darkly Splendid Earth (1991)
- Alfred Schnittke
  - Sonata for Violin and Chamber Orchestra (1968; orig. for violin and piano, 1963)
  - Quasi una sonata (1987)
  - Homage to Grieg (1993)
- Franz Schubert
  - Konzertstück in D major, D. 345 (1816)
  - Rondo in A major, D. 438 (1816)
  - Polonaise in B♭ major, D. 580 (1817)
- Robert Schumann
  - Fantasy in C major, Op. 131 (1853)
- Raminta Šerkšnytė
  - Vortex (2004)
- John Sharpley
  - Fantasy for Violin and Orchestra "Greeting Card" (1999)
- Jean Sibelius
  - 2 serenades, Op. 69 (1913)
    1. Andante assai in D major
    2. Lento assai in G minor
  - 6 Humoresques (1917)
    1. Humoresque in D minor, Op. 87, No. 1
    2. Humoresque in D major, Op. 87, No. 2
    3. Humoresque in G minor, Op. 89, No. 1
    4. Humoresque in G minor, Op. 89, No. 2
    5. Humoresque in E♭ major, Op. 89, No. 3
    6. Humoresque in G minor, Op. 89, No. 4
  - Suite, Op. 117 (1929)
    1. Country scenery
    2. Evening in Spring
    3. In the Summer
- Christian Sinding
  - Suite in A minor, Op. 10, Suite in the Old Style (1889)
  - Romance in D major, Op. 100 (1910)
- Josef Suk
  - Fantasy in G minor (1902)
- Johan Svendsen
  - Romance Op. 26 (1881)
- Tan Dun
  - Out of Peking Opera (1987, rev. 1994)
- Sergei Taneyev
  - Concert Suite for Violin and Orchestra, Op. 28 (1909)
- Pyotr Ilyich Tchaikovsky
  - Sérénade mélancolique, Op. 26 (1875)
  - Valse-Scherzo, Op. 34 (1878)
  - Souvenir d'un lieu cher, Op. 42 (1878) (Orchestration: Glazunov)
    - Méditation (D minor)
    - Scherzo (C minor)
    - Mélodie: chant sans paroles (E♭ major)
- Ralph Vaughan Williams
  - The Lark Ascending (1914)
- Heitor Villa-Lobos
  - Fantasia de movimentos mistos for violin and orchestra (1921)
  - O martírio dos insetos for violin and orchestra (1925)
- Henryk Wieniawski
  - Légende in G minor, Op. 17 (1859)
  - Fantasia on Themes from Gounod's 'Faust', Op. 20
- John Williams
  - TreeSong (2000)
- John Woolrich
  - Capriccio (2009)
- Charles Wuorinen
  - Concertante II for violin and chamber orchestra (1958)
  - Rhapsody for violin and orchestra (1983)
- Iannis Xenakis
  - Dox-Orkh (1991)
- Aleksander Zarzycki
  - Andante et polonaise in A major for violin and orchestra, Op. 23
  - Introduction et cracovienne in D major for violin and orchestra, Op. 35
- Hermann Zilcher
  - Klage, Konzertstück in F♯ minor for violin and small orchestra, Op. 22 (1908)
  - Skizzen aus dem Orient for violin and chamber orchestra, Op. 18 (1906)
- Ellen Taafe Zwilich
  - Romance for violin and chamber orchestra (1993)

== Works for orchestra or large ensemble with prominent solo violin part ==
- Wolfgang Amadeus Mozart
  - Serenade for orchestra in D major, K. 250 ("Haffner") (1776)
- Nikolai Rimsky-Korsakov
  - Scheherazade, Op. 35 (1888)
  - Capriccio Espagnol, Op. 34 (1887)
- Charles Villiers Stanford
  - Irish Rhapsody No. 6 in D minor, Op. 191
- Richard Strauss
  - Also sprach Zarathustra, Op. 30 (1896)
  - Don Quixote, Op. 35 (1897)
  - Ein Heldenleben, Op. 40 (1899)

== Concertos for violin and other solo instrument(s) ==
- Henk Badings
  - Concerto for violin, viola and orchestra (1965)
- Osvaldas Balakauskas
  - Sinfonia Concertante, for violin and piano (1982)
- Giovanni Bottesini
  - Gran duo Concertante, for violin and double-bass
- Ludwig van Beethoven
  - Triple Concerto in C major, Op. 56, for piano, violin, and cello (1804–5)
- Johannes Brahms
  - Double Concerto in A minor, Op. 102, for violin and cello
- Peter Maxwell Davies
  - Strathclyde Concerto No. 5, for violin, viola and string orchestra (1991)
- Frederick Delius
  - Double Concerto for violin and cello (1916)
- Joseph Haydn
  - Concerto in F major, Hob. XVIII/6, for piano, violin, and strings (before 1766)
- Alan Hovhaness
  - Concerto for violin, sitar, and orchestra, Op. 228
- Johann Nepomuk Hummel
  - Double Concerto in G major, Op. 17, for piano and violin
- Julius Juzeliūnas
  - Concerto for Violin and Organ (1963)
- Ernst Krenek
  - Concerto for Violin and Piano, Op. 124
- Bohuslav Martinů
  - Concerto for Violin and Piano (1953)
- Felix Mendelssohn
  - Concerto in D minor, for violin and piano
- Francisco Mignone
  - Double concerto for violin and piano (1966)
- Wolfgang Amadeus Mozart
  - Sinfonia Concertante for Violin, Viola and Orchestra
  - Sinfonia Concertante for Violin, Viola, Cello and Orchestra (fragment)
  - Concerto for Violin, Piano, and Orchestra (fragment)
- Julius Röntgen
  - Triple concerto in B♭ major, for violin, viola, cello and strings (1922)
  - Double Concerto for violin and cello (1927)
  - Triple concerto for violin, viola and cello (1930)
  - Introduktion, Fuge, Intermezzo und Finale for violin, viola, cello
- Dame Ethel Smyth
  - Concerto in A major for Violin, French horn and Orchestra (1927)
- Alexander Tchaikovsky
  - Concerto for Violin, Viola and orchestra (1988)
- Anatol Vieru
  - Concerto for violin, cello, and orchestra (1979)
- Robert Ward
  - Dialogues, a Triple Concerto for violin, cello, piano and orchestra (1986–2002)
- Mark Wessel
  - Ballade, for solo violin, solo oboe, and string orchestra (1931)
- Ellen Taafe Zwilich
  - Concerto for violin, cello and orchestra (1991)

== See also ==
- String instrument repertoire
- List of double concertos for violin and cello
- List of triple concertos for violin, cello, and piano
- List of compositions for two violins
