= Violin concerto =

Musical work for solo violin and ensemble

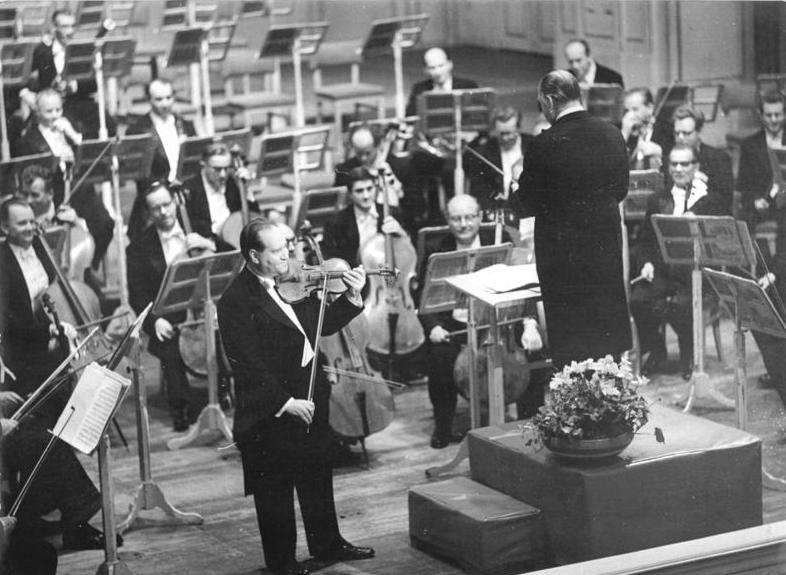
David Oistrakh playing a violin concerto, 1960

A violin concerto is a concerto for solo violin (occasionally, two or more violins) and instrumental ensemble (customarily orchestra). Such works have been written since the Baroque period, when the solo concerto form was first developed, up through the present day. Many major composers have contributed to the violin concerto repertoire.

Traditionally a three-movement work, the violin concerto has been structured in four movements by a number of modern composers, including Dmitri Shostakovich, Igor Stravinsky, and Alban Berg. (Note: In Berg's concerto, the first two and last two movements are conjoined, with the only break coming between the second and third movements.) In some violin concertos, especially from the Baroque and modern eras, the violin (or group of violins) is accompanied by a chamber ensemble rather than an orchestra—for instance, in Vivaldi's L'estro armonico, originally scored for four violins, two violas, cello, and continuo, and in Allan Pettersson's first concerto, for violin and string quartet.

== List of violin concertos ==
The following concertos are presently found near the center of the mainstream Western repertoire.

- John Adams
  - Violin Concerto (1993)
- Malcolm Arnold
  - Concerto for Two Violins and String Orchestra (1969)
- Johann Sebastian Bach
  - Violin Concerto in A minor, BWV 1041 (1717–1723)
  - Violin Concerto in E major, BWV 1042 (1717–1723)
  - Double Violin Concerto in D minor, BWV 1043 (1723)
- Samuel Barber
  - Violin Concerto, Op. 14 (1939)
- Béla Bartók
  - Violin Concerto No. 1 (1908)
  - Violin Concerto No. 2 (1938)
- Ludwig van Beethoven
  - Violin Concerto in D major, Op. 61 (1806)
- Alban Berg
  - Violin Concerto (1935)
- Ernest Bloch
  - Violin Concerto (1938)
- Nimrod Borenstein
  - Concerto for violin and orchestra opus 60 (2013)
- Johannes Brahms
  - Violin Concerto in D major, Op. 77 (1878)
- Benjamin Britten
  - Violin Concerto (1939)
- Max Bruch
  - Violin Concerto No. 1 in G minor, Op. 26 (1867)
  - Violin Concerto No. 2 in D minor, Op. 44 (1878)
  - Violin Concerto No. 3 in D minor, Op. 58 (1891)
- Henri Casadesus
  - Concerto in D major in the style of Luigi Boccherini
- Frederick Delius
  - Violin Concerto
- Henri Dutilleux
  - L'Arbre des songes (1985)
- Antonín Dvořák
  - Violin Concerto in A minor, Op. 53 (1879–1880)
- Danny Elfman
  - Concerto for Violin and Orchestra "Eleven Eleven" (2017)
- Edward Elgar
  - Violin Concerto in B minor, Op. 61 (1910)
- Eduard Franck
  - Violin Concerto in E minor, Op. 30 (1855/1861)
  - Violin Concerto in D major, Op. 57 (1875)
- Richard Franck
  - Violin Concerto in D major, Op. 43 (1906)
- Hans Gal
  - Violin Concerto Op. 39 (1932)
  - Concertino for Violin and Orchestra Op. 52 (1939)
- Philip Glass
  - Concerto for Violin and Orchestra, No. 1 (1987)
  - Concerto for Violin and Orchestra, No. 2, "The American Four Seasons" (2009)
- Alexander Glazunov
  - Violin Concerto in A minor, Op. 82 (1904)
- Karl Goldmark
  - Violin Concerto No. 1 in A minor, Op. 28 (1877)
- Georg Friedrich Händel
  - Violin Concerto in B♭ major, HWV 288 (ca. 1707)
- Joseph Haydn
  - Violin Concerto No. 1 in C major, Hob. VIIa:1 (ca. 1765)
  - Violin Concerto No. 2 in D major, Hob. VIIa:2 (1765, lost)
  - Violin Concerto No. 3 in A major, Hob. VIIa:3 "Melker Konzert" (ca. 1770)
  - Violin Concerto No. 4 in G major, Hob. VIIa:4 (1769)
- Jennifer Higdon
  - Violin Concerto (2008)
- Paul Hindemith
  - Violin Concerto (1939)
- Robin Holloway
  - Violin Concerto Op. 70 (1990)
- Akira Ifukube
  - Rhapsodia Concertante for Violin and Orchestra (1948)
  - Violin Concerto No. 2 (1978)
- Shin'ichiro Ikebe
  - Violin Concerto, (1981)
- Joseph Joachim
  - Violin Concerto No. 2 in D minor
- Mieczysław Karłowicz
  - Violin Concerto in A major, Op. 8 (1902)
- Aram Khachaturian
  - Violin Concerto in D minor, Op. 46 (1940)
- Ståle Kleiberg
  - Violin Concerto no. 1 (2005)
  - Violin Concerto no. 2 (2017)
- Erich Wolfgang Korngold
  - Violin Concerto in D major, Op. 35 (1945)
- Édouard Lalo
  - Violin Concerto in F major, Op. 20 (1874)
  - Symphonie Espagnole (1874)
- Jean-Marie Leclair
  - 12 concertos for violin and orchestra op.7 & op.10
- Marian Lejava
  - Vertigo - Concerto for Violin and Ensemble Op. 23 (2018)
- Lowell Liebermann
  - Concerto for Violin and Orchestra Op. 74 (2001)
- Avrohom Leichtling
  - Concerto for Violin and Orchestra Op. 95 (1988–1991)
- György Ligeti
  - Violin Concerto (1992)
- Karol Lipiński
  - Violin Concerto No. 1 Op. 14 in F♯ minor (1822)
  - Violin Concerto No. 2 "Militaire" Op. 21 in D major (1826)
  - Violin Concerto No. 3 Op. 24 in E minor (1830–33)
  - Violin Concerto No. 4 Op. 32 in A major (1844)
- Wynton Marsalis
  - Violin Concerto (2019)
- Henri Marteau
  - Violin Concerto in C Major, Op. 18 (1916)
- Bohuslav Martinů
  - Violin Concerto No 1 H 232b (1933)
  - Violin Concerto No. 2 H 293 (1943)
- Felix Mendelssohn
  - Violin Concerto in D minor (1822)
  - Violin Concerto in E minor, Op. 64 (1844)
- Edgar Meyer
  - Violin Concerto (2000)
- Nikolai Myaskovsky
  - Violin Concerto in D Minor, Op. 44 (1938)
- Wolfgang Amadeus Mozart
  - Violin Concerto No. 1 in B♭ major, K. 207 (1773), with alternative Rondo in B♭, K. 269/261a (added 1775–1777)
  - Violin Concerto No. 2 in D major, K. 211 (1775)
  - Violin Concerto No. 3 in G major, K. 216, Strassburg (1775)
  - Violin Concerto No. 4 in D major, K. 218 (1775)
  - Violin Concerto No. 5 in A major, K. 219, Turkish (1775), with alternative Adagio in E, K. 261 (added 1776)
  - Violin Concerto No. 6 in E♭ major, K. 268 (Attributed to Johann Friedrich Eck, 1780–81)
  - Violin Concerto No. 7 in D major, K. 271a, Kolb (Doubtful, 1777)
  - Adélaïde Concerto (Forgery by Marius Casadesus, 1933)
- Marjan Mozetich
  - Affairs of the Heart: Violin Concerto (1998)
- Carl Nielsen
  - Violin Concerto, Op. 33 (1911)
- Michael Nyman
  - Violin Concerto (2003)
- Niccolò Paganini
  - Violin Concerto No. 1 in D major, Op. 6, MS 21 (ca. 1811–17)
  - Violin Concerto No. 2 in B minor, Op. 7, MS 48, La Campanella (1826)
  - Violin Concerto No. 3 in E major, MS 50 (ca. 1826–30)
  - Violin Concerto No. 4 in D minor, MS 60 (ca. 1829–30)
  - Violin Concerto No. 5 in A minor, MS 78 (1830)
  - Violin Concerto No. 6 in E minor, Op. posth., MS 75—probably the first to be written; only the solo part survives
- Giovanni Battista Pergolesi
  - Violin Concerto in B♭ major
- Manuel M. Ponce
  - Violin Concerto (1943)
- Gerhard Präsent
  - Violin Concerto Op. 73 (2015)
- André Previn
  - Violin Concerto "Anne-Sophie" (2001)
- Florence Price
  - Violin Concerto No. 1 in D major (1939)
  - Violin Concerto No. 2 in D minor (1952)
- Sergei Prokofiev
  - Violin Concerto No. 1 in D major, Op. 19 (1917)
  - Violin Concerto No. 2 in G minor, Op. 63 (1935)
- Behzad Ranjbaran
  - Violin Concerto (2002)
- Max Reger
  - Violin Concerto in A major Op. 101 (1907–1908)
- Miklós Rózsa
  - Violin Concerto, Op. 24 (1953)
- Camille Saint-Saëns
  - Violin Concerto No. 1 in A major, Op. 20 (1859)
  - Violin Concerto No. 2 in C major, Op. 58 (1858)
  - Violin Concerto No. 3 in B minor, Op. 61 (1880)
- Esa-Pekka Salonen
  - Violin Concerto (2009)
- Alfred Schnittke
  - Concerto No. 1 for violin and orchestra (1957, revised 1963)
  - Concerto No. 2 for violin and chamber orchestra (1966)
  - Concerto No. 3 for violin and chamber orchestra (1978)
  - Concerto No. 4 for violin and orchestra (1984)
- Arnold Schoenberg
  - Violin Concerto (1936)
- Robert Schumann
  - Violin Concerto, WoO 23 (1853)
- Laura Schwendinger
  - Violin Concerto "Chiaroscuro Azzurro"
- Vache Sharafyan
  - Concerto-Serenata for violin and strings
  - Con-Cor-Dance Violin Concerto #2
- Dmitri Shostakovich
  - Violin Concerto No. 1 in A minor, Op. 77 (1948, rev. 1955 as Op. 99)
  - Violin Concerto No. 2 in C♯ minor, Op. 129 (1967)
- Aleksandr Shymko
  - Violin Concerto (2012)
- Peter Seabourne
  - Violin Concerto (with string orchestra) (2018)
- Jean Sibelius
  - Violin Concerto in D minor, Op. 47 (1904)
- Maddalena Laura Sirmen
  - Six Violin Concerti
- Richard Strauss
  - Violin Concerto (1881–82)
- Igor Stravinsky
  - Violin Concerto (1931)
- Karol Szymanowski
  - Violin Concerto No. 1, Op. 35 (1916)
  - Violin Concerto No. 2, Op. 61 (1932–1933)
- Toru Takemitsu
  - Far calls. Coming, far! for Violin and Orchestra (1980)
- Boris Tchaikovsky
  - Concerto for Violin and Orchestra (1969)
- Pyotr Ilyich Tchaikovsky
  - Violin Concerto in D major, Op. 35 (1878)
- Daniel Theaker
  - Violin Concerto
- Henri Vieuxtemps
  - Violin Concerto No. 1 in E major, Op. 10 (1840)
  - Violin Concerto No. 2 in F♯ minor, Op. 19 (ca. 1835–36)
  - Violin Concerto No. 3 in A major, Op. 25 (1844)
  - Violin Concerto No. 4 in D minor, Op. 31 (ca. 1850)
  - Violin Concerto No. 5 in A minor, Op. 37, Grétry (1861)
  - Violin Concerto No. 6 in G major, Op. 47/Op. posth. 1 (1865–1870)
  - Violin Concerto No. 7 in A minor, Op. 49/Op. posth. 3
- Antonio Vivaldi — many, particularly:
  - L'estro Armonico, Op. 3 (1711)—twelve concertos
  - La stravaganza, Op. 4 (ca. 1714)
  - The Four Seasons (ca. 1725)—four concertos, the first four numbers of Il cimento dell'armonia e dell'inventione, Op. 8
- Giovanni Battista Viotti
  - Violin Concerto No. 22 in A Minor
- William Walton
  - Violin Concerto (1939)
- Henryk Wieniawski
  - Violin Concerto No. 1 in F♯ minor, Op. 14 (1853)
  - Violin Concerto No. 2 in D minor, Op. 22 (1862)
- John Williams
  - Concerto for Violin and Orchestra (1976)
  - TreeSong: for Violin and Orchestra (2000)
- Malcolm Williamson
  - Violin Concerto (1963–1964)
- Felix Woyrsch
  - Skaldische Rhapsodie in D minor, Op. 50 (1904)
- Pēteris Vasks
  - Tālā Gaisma ("Distant Light") (1996-7)
- He Zhanhao and Chen Gang
  - Butterfly Lovers' Violin Concerto (1959)

== List of other works for violin and orchestra ==
- Béla Bartók
  - Violin Rhapsody No. 1 (1929)
  - Violin Rhapsody No. 2 (1928)
- Ludwig van Beethoven
  - Romance No. 1 in G major, op. 40 (1798–1802)
  - Romance No. 2 in F major, op. 50 (1798–1802)
- Hector Berlioz
  - Rêverie et Caprice, Op. 8 (1841; 1842)
- Leonard Bernstein
  - Serenade, after Plato: Symposium (1954)
- Ernest Bloch
  - Baal Shem (1939)
- Max Bruch
  - Romance in A minor, op. 42 (1874)
  - Scottish Fantasy, op. 46 (1880)
  - Adagio Appassionato in C♯ minor, op. 57 (1890)
  - In memoriam, op. 65 (1893)
  - Serenade in A minor, op. 75 (1899–1900)
  - Konzertstück in F♯ minor, op. 84 (ca. 1911)
- Ernest Chausson
  - Poème, op. 25 (1896)
- John Corigliano
  - Chaconne from The Red Violin
- Antonín Dvořák
  - Romance in F minor, op. 11 (1877)
- Richard Franck
  - Serenade in A major, op. 25 (1896)
- Takekuni Hirayoshi
  - Requiem for violin and orchestra
- Joe Hisaishi
  - Interior Symphony for Electric Violin and Chamber Orchestra (2015)
- Jules Massenet
  - "Méditation" from Thaïs (1894)
- Wolfgang Amadeus Mozart
  - Concertone in C major, for two violins and orchestra, K. 190 (1774)
  - Rondo in B♭ major, K. 269/261a (1775-1777)
  - Adagio in E major, K. 261 (1776)
  - Rondo in C major, K. 373 (1781)
- Arvo Pärt
  - Fratres for violin, string orchestra and percussion (1992)
  - Darf ich... for violin, bells and string orchestra (1995/1999)
- Maurice Ravel
  - Tzigane (1924)
- Laurence Rosenthal
  - Prophetic Voices for violin, percussion and orchestra
- Camille Saint-Saëns
  - Introduction and Rondo Capriccioso in A minor, op. 28 (1863)
  - Romance in C major, op. 48 (1874)
  - Morceau de concert in G major, op. 62 (1880)
  - Havanaise in E major, op. 83 (1887)
  - Caprice andalous in G major, op. 122 (1904)
- Pablo de Sarasate
  - Zigeunerweisen, op. 20 (1878)
  - Carmen Fantasy, op. 25 (1883)
  - Miramar-Zortzico, op. 42 (1899)
  - Introduction and Tarantella, op. 43 (1899)
- Akira Senju
  - Sai Fog for violin and string orchestra (1994)
  - Four Seasons for violin and string orchestra (2004)
- Franz Schubert
  - Konzertstück in D major, D. 345 (1816)
  - Rondo in A major, D. 438 (1816)
  - Polonaise in B♭ major, D. 580 (1817)
- Robert Schumann
  - Fantasy in C major, Op. 131 (1853)
- Josef Suk
  - Fantasy in G minor, Op. 24
- Toru Takemitsu
  - Nostalghia—In Memory of Andrei Tarkovsky for violin and string orchestra (1987)
- Pyotr Ilyich Tchaikovsky
  - Sérénade mélancolique, Op. 26 (1875)
  - Souvenir d'un lieu cher, Op. 42 (written for violin and piano in 1878; arranged for violin and orchestra by Alexander Glazunov in 1896)
  - Valse-Scherzo, Op. 34 (1877)
- Andrew Thomas
  - Premonitions (2017, written for violinist Claudia Schaer and North/South Ensemble)
- John Williams
  - Markings for solo violin, strings and harp (2017)
- Ralph Vaughan Williams
  - The Lark Ascending (1914)
- Henryk Wieniawski
  - Polonaise de Concert No. 1, Op. 4 (sometimes known as Polonaise Brillante; 1853)
  - Légende in G minor, op. 17 (1859)
  - Fantasy brillante on Gounod's "Faust", op.20

== See also ==
- Violin sonata
- Piano trio
