= Violin Concerto No. 3 =

Violin Concerto No. 3 may refer to any composer's third violin concerto:

- Violin Concerto No. 3 (Bruch) in D minor
- Violin Concerto No. 3 (Haydn) in A major
- Violin Concerto No. 3 (Mozart) in G major
- Violin Concerto No. 3 (Paganini) in E major
- Violin Concerto No. 3 (Saint-Saëns) in B minor
- Violin Concerto No. 3 (Thomas), Juggler in Paradise
- Violin Concerto No. 3 (Vieuxtemps) in A major, by Henri Vieuxtemps

== See also ==
- Violin concerto
- List of compositions for violin and orchestra
