= Violin Concerto in A major =

Violin Concerto in A major may refer to:

- Violin Concerto No. 3 (Haydn)
- Violin Concerto No. 5 (Mozart)
- Violin Concerto in A major (Respighi)
