= Op. 75 =

In music, Op. 75 stands for Opus number 75. Compositions that are assigned this number include:

- Bruch – Serenade
- Dvořák – Romantic Pieces
- Elgar – Carillon
- Fauré – Andante for violin and piano
- Saint-Saëns – Violin Sonata No. 1
- Schumann – Romanzen & Balladen volume II (5 partsongs)
- Sibelius – Five Pieces, Op. 75, The Trees, for solo piano (1914)
- Strauss – Die ägyptische Helena
- Toch – Symphony No. 3
- Weber – Bassoon Concerto
