= 1775 in music =

== Events ==
- February 23 – Première of Pierre Beaumarchais's play, The Barber of Seville, which will later provide material for more than one opera.
- Wilhelm Hauser becomes organist at the monastery of Lavaldieu and the teacher of Étienne Méhul.

== Classical music ==
- Carl Friedrich Abel – 6 String Quartets, Op. 12
- John Alcock Jr. – 8 Easy Organ Voluntaries
- Carl Philipp Emanuel Bach
  - Symphony in D major, H.663
  - Symphony in F major, H.665
- Johann Christian Bach – Sinfonia concertante, W.C 34
- Wilhelm Friedemann Bach – Keyboard Sonata in G major, F.7
- Giovanni Battista Cirri – 6 String Quartets, Op. 13
- Carl Ditters von Dittersdorf – Concerto for Oboe in D major
- Tommaso Giordani – 6 Flute Trios, Op. 12
- Joseph Haydn
  - Baryton Trio in D major, Hob.XI:114
  - Il Ritorno di Tobia, Hob.XXI:1 (sacred oratorio)
  - Mass in B-flat major, Hob.XXII:7
- Joseph Martin Kraus – Requiem
- Georg Anton Kreusser – 6 Flute Quintets, Op. 10
- Franz Lamotte – Violin Concerto No. 2
- Wolfgang Amadeus Mozart
  - Violin Concertos No. 3, No. 4 & No. 5
  - Symphony in C major, K.102/213c
  - Serenade in D major, K.204/213a
  - Church Sonata in B-flat major, K.212
  - Misericordias Domini, K.222/205a
- Friedrich Wilhelm Rust – Sonata in A major, CzaR 110
- Friedrich Schwindl – 6 Quartets, Op. 7
- Maddalena Laura Sirmen – 6 Duets, Op. 5
- Johann Matthias Sperger – Quartet in D major, for flute, viola, cello, and contrabass, M.C III:23a
- Carl Stamitz – 3 Quintets, Op. 11
- John Stanley – Six Concertos for the Organ, Harpsichord, or Forte Piano, with Accompanyments [sic] for Two Violins and a Bass, Op. 10 (London: Printed for the Author, and Sold by Mr Welcker)
- Johann Adolph Hasse – La Danza

== Opera ==
- Johann André – Erwin und Elmire
- Pasquale Anfossi – L'Avaro
- André Ernest Modeste Grétry – La fausse Magie
- Joseph Haydn – L'incontro improvviso, Hob.XXVIII:6
- Gaetano Latilla – Antigono
- Wolfgang Amadeus Mozart
  - La finta giardiniera, K. 196 (premiered January 13)
  - Il re pastore, K. 208
- Josef Mysliveček – Il Demofoonte (second version, first premiered in 1769)
- Giovanni Paisiello
  - Socrate immaginario, R.1.48
  - Il gran Cid, R.1.49

== Methods and theory writings ==
- Andrea Basili – Musica universale armonico pratica
- Marie-Dominique-Joseph Engramelle – La Tonotechnie
- Fedele Fenaroli – Regole musicali per i principianti di cembalo
- Johann Caspar Heck – Short and Fundamental Instructions for Learning Thorough Bass
- Jacob Schuback – Von der musikalischen Declamation

== Births ==
- January 21 – Manuel del Pópulo Vicente García, singer and composer (d. 1832)
- March 24 – Muthuswami Dikshitar, poet and composer (d. 1835)
- May 1 – Sophia Dussek, composer and musician (died 1831)
- June 4 – Francesco Molino, guitarist and composer (d. 1847)
- June 13 – Antoni Radziwiłł, politician and musician (d. 1833)
- July 5 – William Crotch, composer (d. 1847)
- July 9 – Matthew Gregory Lewis, librettist and writer (died 1818)
- August 2 – José Ángel Lamas, composer (d. 1814)
- August 31 – François de Fossa, guitarist and composer (d. 1849)
- September 17 – Margrethe Schall, ballerina (d. 1852)
- October 6 – Johann Anton André, German composer (died 1842)
- October 15 – Bernhard Henrik Crusell, clarinettist and composer (d. 1838)
- October 21 – Giuseppe Baini, composer and music critic (d. 1844)
- October 30 – Catterino Cavos, organist, conductor and composer (d. 1840)
- December 6 – Nicolo Isouard, Maltese composer (died 1818)
- December 16 – François-Adrien Boïeldieu, composer (d. 1834)
- December 25 – Antun Sorkočević, writer, composer and diplomat (d. 1841)
- date unknown
  - Joseph Antonio Emidy, violinist and composer (d. 1835)
  - Andrea Nozzari, operatic tenor (d. 1832)
  - Giovanni Schmidt, Italian librettist (died c. 1839)

== Deaths ==
- January 15 – Giovanni Battista Sammartini, organist and composer (b. c. 1700)
- May 1–4? — Francesco Barsanti, composer; recorder & oboe virtuoso (b. 1690)
- May 7 – Cornelius Heinrich Dretzel, organist and composer (b. 1697)
- May 9 – Vittoria Tesi, operatic contralto (b. 1700)
- June 11 – Egidio Duni, composer (b. 1708)
- July 26 – Alessandro Besozzi, oboist and composer (b. 1702)
- November 1 – Pierre-Joseph-Justin Bernard, librettist and writer (born 1708)
- November 7 – François Rebel, composer (b. 1701)
- December 9 – Pietro Gnocchi, composer (b. 1689)
- date unknown – Rosa Scarlatti, opera singer (b. 1727)
