= Rondo in B-flat for Violin and Orchestra (Mozart) =

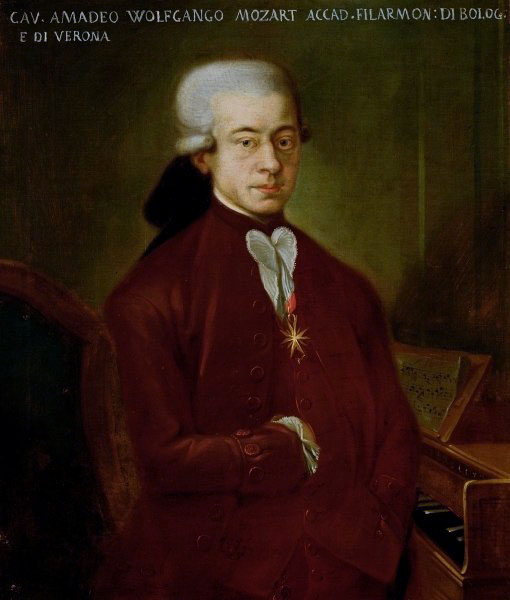
1777 portrait of Mozart

Wolfgang Amadeus Mozart's Rondo in B♭ for Violin and Orchestra, K. 269/261a, likely was composed between 1775 and 1777 as a replacement finale for the Violin Concerto No. 1, K. 207.

Like the Adagio in E and Rondo in C, the Rondo in B♭ was requested by Italian violinist Antonio Brunetti and Mozart composed the new finale for that work. It is not performed as such by modern orchestras, however, but presented as a separate work that is performed by itself.

The work is scored for solo violin, two oboes, two horns, and strings.

== Analysis ==
The Rondo is marked Allegro and its time signature is 6/8.
