= Violin Concerto in E major =

Violin Concerto in E major may refer to:

- "La primavera" (Spring), RV 269, the first of "Il cimento dell'armonia e dell'inventione" (Vivaldi)
- Violin Concerto in E major (Bach)
- Violin Concerto No. 3 (Paganini)
