= Violin Concerto No. 1 (Mozart) =

Violin concerto by W. A. Mozart

- by W. A. Mozart
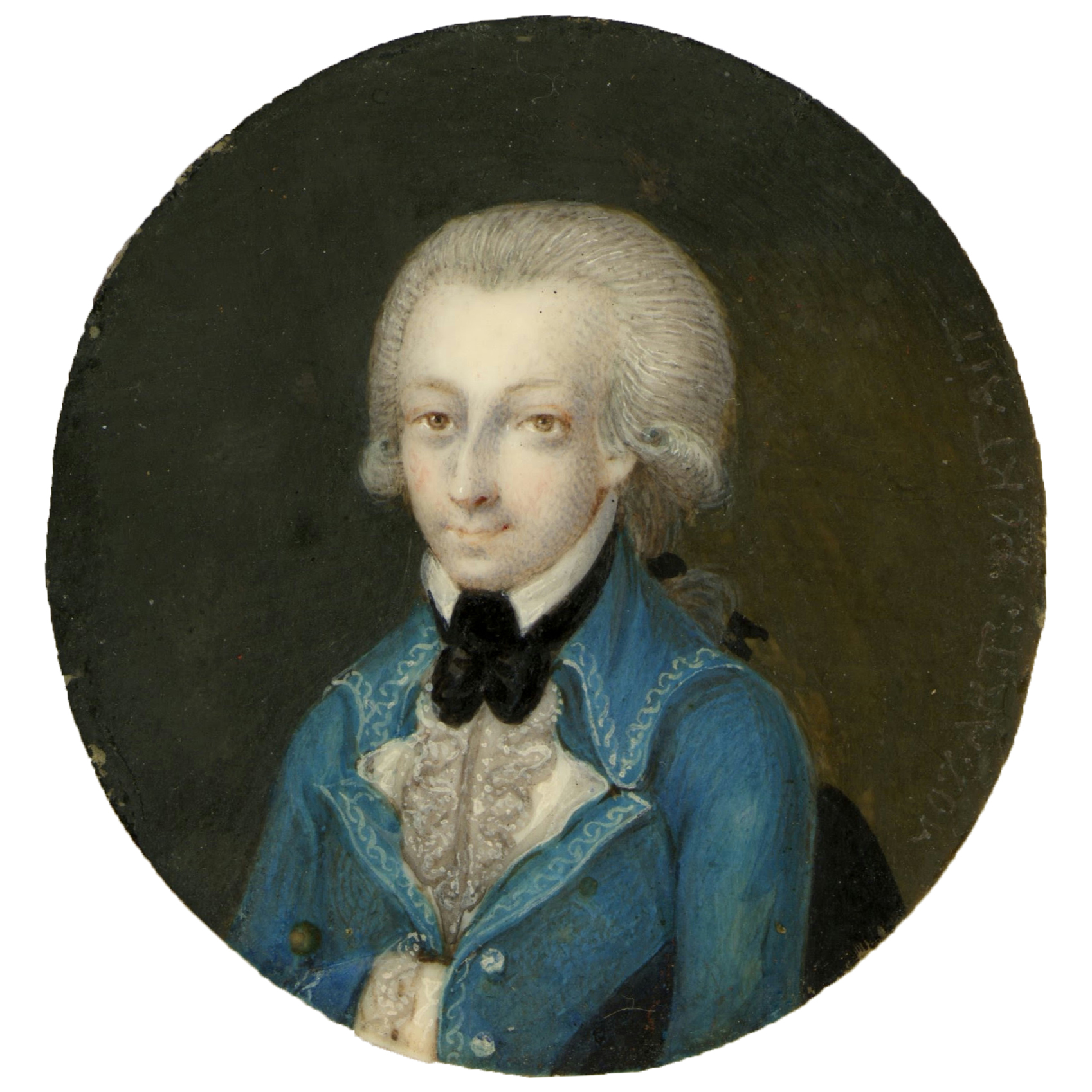
- 1773 miniature of Mozart
- Key: B♭ major
- Catalogue: K. 207
- Composed: 1773?
- Movements: 3
- Scoring: Violin; orchestra

I. Allegro moderato

II. Adagio

III. Presto

Wolfgang Amadeus Mozart's Violin Concerto No. 1 in B♭ major, K. 207, once was supposed to have been composed in 1775 (when Mozart was 19), along with his other four violin concertos. However, analysis of handwriting and the manuscript paper on which the concerto was written suggest that the date of composition might have been 1773, specifically with a completion date of April 1773. If this date is correct, the concerto is likely to be Mozart's first original concerto. It exhibits the usual fast–slow–fast structure that was predominant for solo concertos of the late eighteenth century.

The musicologist Wolfgang Plath, after critically analysing the autograph score of all five of Mozart's violin concertos, discovered that the last two digits of the date on each had been tampered with. According to Plath, all dates were altered to read 1780 at some point, and subsequently changed back to 1775 later. Using evidence displayed in the handwriting and watermarks, Plath argued that the latter date was most likely correct for the last four concertos, but he refuted the claim of K. 207 being written in the same year; he proposed that the work, instead, originally bore a date of 1773.

The reason for the composition of the violin concertos is generally uncertain, although it is evident that the composer performed them in public on several occasions. Contrary to the erroneous statement that implies otherwise, they could not have been written for Antonio Brunetti, the concertmaster of the Salzburg court orchestra, due to the fact that (as observed by Zaslaw) the violinist only assumed the post in 1776.

Zaslaw also addresses the Kolb issue. This is in reference to a violin concerto mentioned by Wolfgang's father, Leopold, in a letter from August 1778, reading: "the concerto you [Wolfgang] wrote for Kolb". This refers to Salzburg violinist Franz Xaver Kolb, who is recorded to have performed said concerto to great success in September 1777 and July 1778. The identity of the concerto that Kolb performed has been speculated by scholars, as there are no specific details regarding the work on which musicologists can build upon. It was proposed by Carl Bär in 1963 that the spurious violin concerto, K. 271a was the mentioned work performed by Kolb, and has ergo been given the nickname the Kolb Concerto. The authenticity of the work has been doubted and dismissed by several Mozart experts, and was excluded in the first edition of the Köchel catalogue.

Daniel E. Freeman has recently brought to light new evidence that supports the dating of April 1773, when Mozart had just returned to Salzburg from Italy, where he maintained close contacts with his close friend Josef Mysliveček, one of the most prominent composers of violin concertos in Italy at the time.

The most striking connection between the first concerto of Mozart and the work of Mysliveček is the opening theme of Mozart's first movement, which appears to be quoted directly from Mysliveček’s Violin Concerto No. 1 in D major, a work that was certainly written earlier, since it appears for sale in the Breitkopf catalog of 1769. The absence of a rondo finale in the original version of Mozart’s concerto is consistent with preferences throughout Europe in the early 1770s (by the time Mozart’s later concertos were written, rondo finales had started to become common). The formal scheme of the fast movements conforms precisely to a distinctive formal scheme that is standard in all of Mysliveček’s violin concertos. Passages for the soloist accompanied only by two violins in this Mozart concerto was a trait of Mysliveček’s violin concertos likely picked up from his contact with Giuseppe Tartini in Padua in the late 1760s.

The movements are:

1. Allegro moderato
2. Adagio
3. Presto

The concerto is full of intricate passage work with running sixteenth notes and characterized generally by high spirits. Its simpler, less developed style in comparison to Mozart's Violin Concertos Nos. 2-5 serves as another likely confirmation of its earlier composition. The composer's abilities had advanced markedly between 1773 and 1775. Multi-work recordings of Mozart's violin concertos often omit his first violin concerto, since it reveals a musical inspiration less compelling than in the others.

The Rondo in B♭, K. 269, for violin and orchestra, also is connected to this concerto. It was intended to replace the finale movement and was composed to fulfil the recommendation of Antonio Brunetti, a violinist in Salzburg at the time. It was obviously composed to "modernise" the concerto in light of the new trend for rondo finales in solo concertos during the mid-1770s.

Nonetheless, typically the concerto is performed with the original finale and the K. 269 Rondo remains a separate concert piece.

== References and sources ==
=== Sources ===
Zaslaw, Neal (1990). The Compleat Mozart: A guide to the musical works of Wolfgang Amadeus Mozart (1st ed.). New York: W. W. Norton & Company. ISBN 0393028860.
