= Rondo in C for Violin and Orchestra (Mozart) =

1781 composition by W. A. Mozart

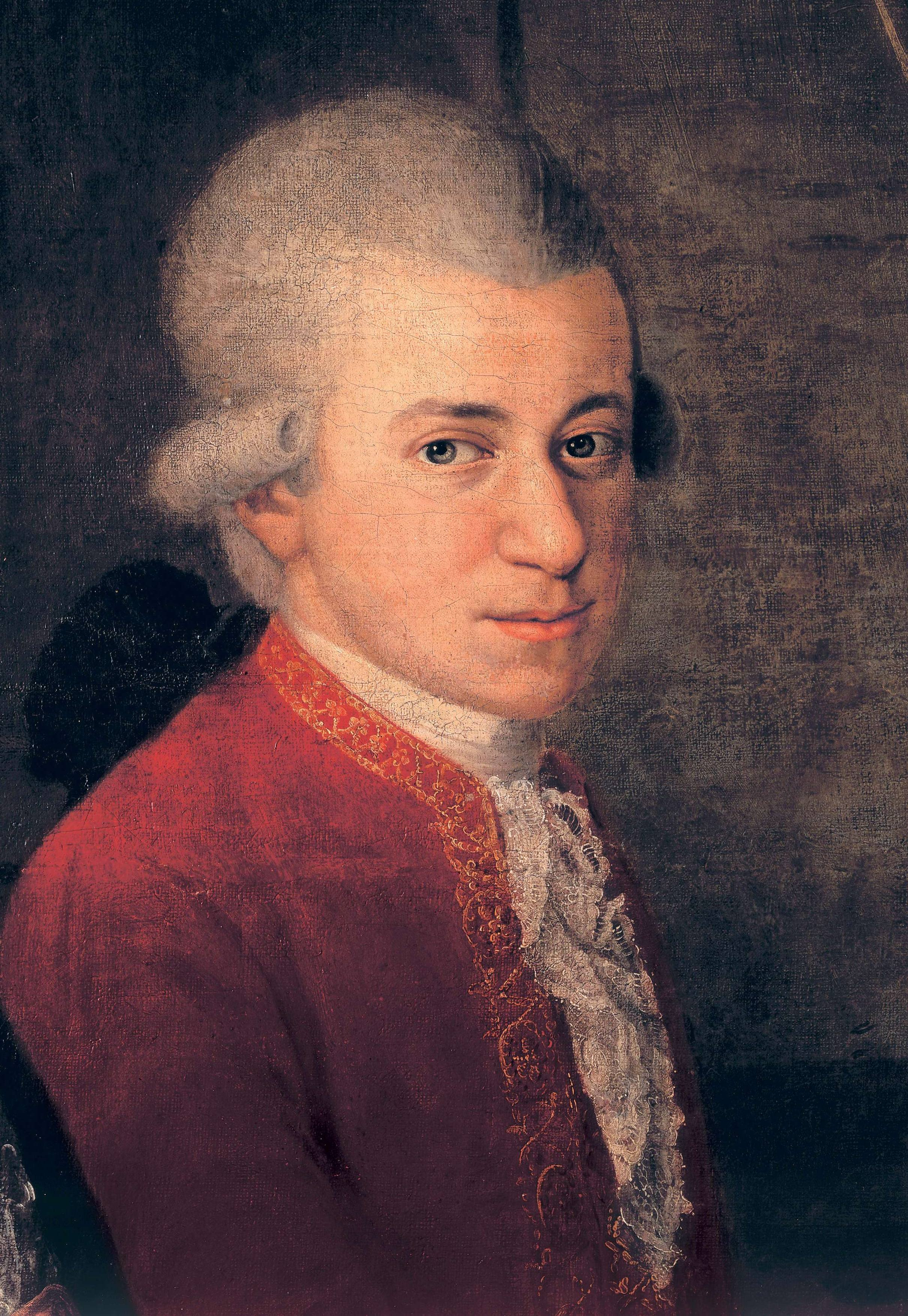
Detail of Wolfgang from the 1780–81 Portrait of the Mozart Family

The Rondo in C for Violin and Orchestra, K. 373, was composed by Wolfgang Amadeus Mozart in April 1781. The rondo was likely written for Italian violinist Antonio Brunetti, who is known to have also requested both the Adagio in E and Rondo in B♭. The Rondo in C, however, was written years after the five numbered violin concertos. The work is scored for solo violin, two oboes, two horns in C, and strings.

== Analysis ==
The Rondo is marked Allegretto grazioso, and a performance typically lasts between 5 and 6 minutes.

== Influence ==
A theme from the rondo was used in Carlos Gardel's 'Por una Cabeza, which was in turn included in films such as Scent of a Woman, True Lies, Schindler's List and others.
