= Violin Concerto No. 4 (Mozart) =

Violin concerto in three movements by W. A. Mozart

- by W. A. Mozart
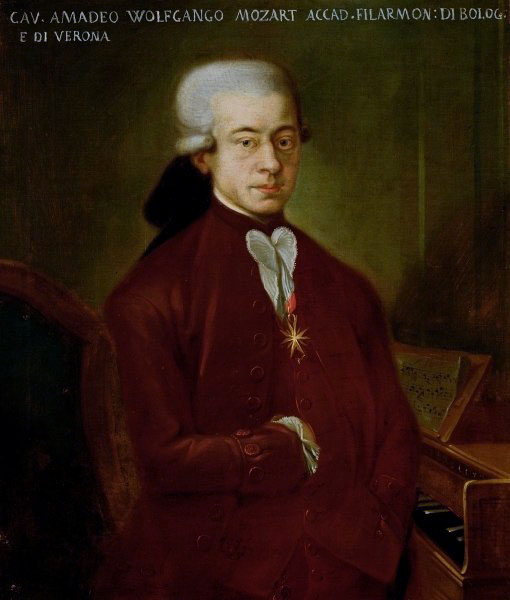
- 1777 portrait of Mozart
- Key: D major
- Catalogue: K. 218
- Composed: 1775
- Movements: 1. Allegro; 2. Andante cantabile 3. Rondeau
- Scoring: Violin; orchestra

Violin Concerto No. 4 in D major, K. 218, was composed by Wolfgang Amadeus Mozart in 1775 in Salzburg. The autograph of the score is preserved in the Biblioteka Jagiellońska, Kraków. He seemed to have originally composed it for himself to play, but after leaving the Salzburg Court Orchestra, he changed and updated the concerto for the successor of his position in his orchestra, Antonio Brunetti, to play. It is debatable whether the concerto was above Mozart's level of mastery or if he purposely made the concerto difficult for Brunetti on account of his greater ability. The first movement is nicknamed the “military” Mozart Concerto while the second movement consists of melodic lines. The third movement is joyful and full of fun.

== Instrumentation ==
The work is scored for solo violin, strings, 2 oboes and 2 horns in D.

== Structure ==
The concerto has the usual fast–slow–fast structure and lasts around 23 minutes. The movements are:

1. Allegro
2. Andante cantabile (A major)
3. Rondeau (Andante grazioso – Allegro ma non troppo)

Opening of the first movement, Allegro, featuring a march rhythm and a bugle-like gesture.
