= Violin Concerto No. 6 (Paganini) =

- "No. 0"; Grande Concerto in E minor
- Violin concerto by Niccolò Paganini
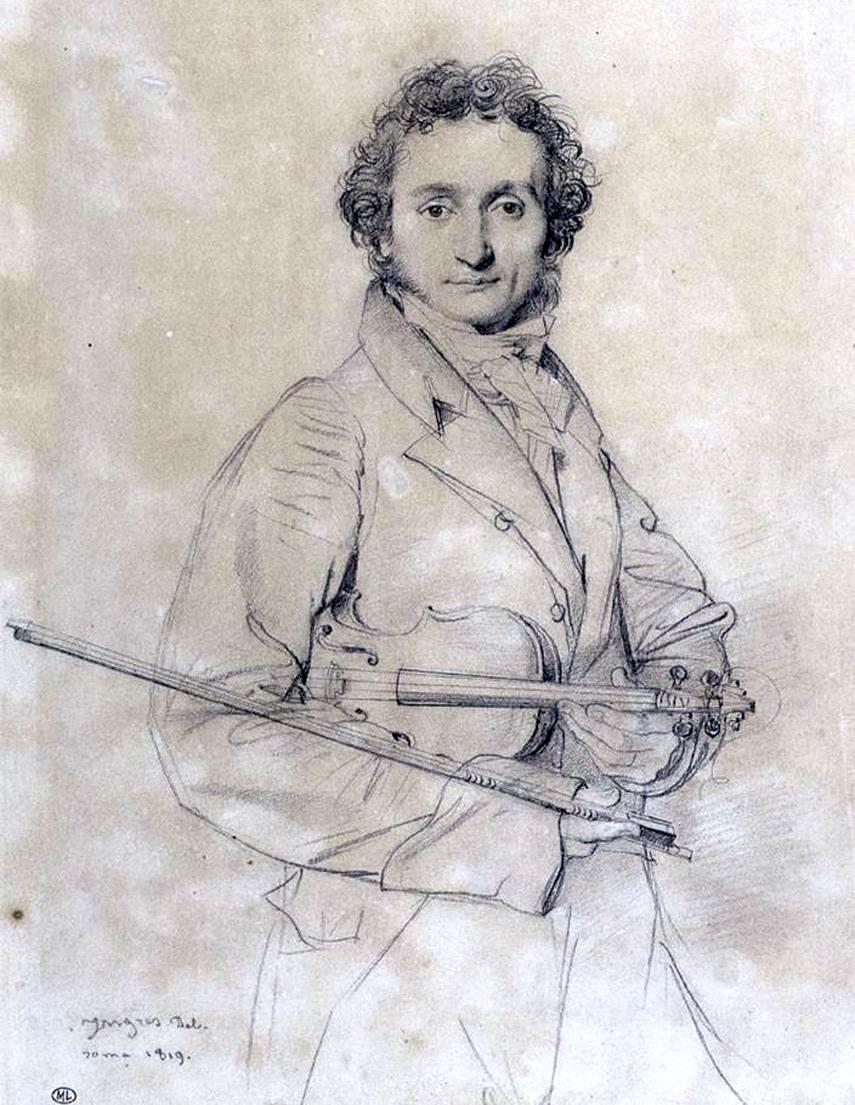
- Niccolò Paganini, 1819
- Key: E minor
- Catalogue: MS 75
- Year: 1815 or earlier
- Duration: 40 minutes approximately
- Movements: 3
- Scoring: Violin and orchestra

Niccolò Paganini's Violin Concerto No. 6 in E minor, MS 75, also sometimes known as the concerto No. 0 and the Grande Concerto in E minor, is the composer's first concerto for violin and orchestra. Composed in 1815 or earlier, it was withdrawn and remained lost for more than 150 years.

== Background ==
The violin concerto was written around 1814–1815, shortly before his Concerto No. 1. Niccolò Paganini performed it as a “new work” in Milan in early summer 1815 and again in Genoa in September of the same year. Soon afterwards, he appears to have withdrawn the piece, and it was considered lost for many years. The concerto was rediscovered in 1972 at a London antique shop by Piero Berri and was subsequently titled the "Posthumous Concerto in E minor" (Concerto postumo). The manuscript that was found contained only the solo violin part and a guitar reduction of the accompaniment, which made it possible to reconstruct the work. The musicologist Federico Mompellio was then commissioned to reconstruct the full orchestral score. This reconstruction was published in 1995, after Mompellio's death, as Volume VI of the National Edition of Paganini’s Works (Edizione nazionale delle opere di N. Paganini). No original full orchestral score or orchestral parts have been found to date, and no original cadenzas have been found or published.

== Structure ==
The concerto follows a typical three-movement structure, with a slow middle movement. It has an approximate duration of 40 minutes and is scored for solo violin and orchestra. The movements are as follows:

1. Risoluto
2. Adagio
3. Rondò ossia Polonese

This early concerto was strongly influenced by Giovanni Battista Viotti, who belonged to the Italian violin tradition of which Paganini was also part. It is technically less demanding than many of his shorter virtuoso pieces. Its use of extended techniques, such as left-hand pizzicato and harmonics, is relatively restrained, probably because concertos were expected to sound more serious and formal than other showpieces. The structure is also less strict than in many other concertos. The work is notable for its finale, a Polonaise in rondo form, a type of movement that became popular after Viotti’s Concerto No. 13 in A major.

== Recordings ==
Because the work was thought to have been lost for a long time and has since circulated mainly in manuscript form until relatively recently, it has rarely been recorded. The world premiere recording was made right after its discovery, in January 1974, by Salvatore Accardo, with Charles Dutoit conducting the London Philharmonic Orchestra, for Deutsche Grammophon at Barking Town Hall, London. Another performance of Francesco Fiore's orchestration of the concerto was recorded by Dynamic with violinist Massimo Quarta playing and conducting the Genoa Carlo Felice Theater Orchestra. The recording, taken in July-September 2002 in Genoa, Italy, featured Quarta playing Paganini's own "Il Cannone Guarnierius". A performance of the surviving manuscript written for solo violin and guitar accompaniment was also recorded by Dynamic, with Luca Fanfoni (violin) and Fabrizio Giudice (guitar). The recording was taken in April 2015 at the Palazzo Tursi, Genoa.
