= Helmers Pavasars =

Latvian musician and composer (1903–1998)

Helmers Pavasars (1903–1998) was a Latvian organist, composer, violinist, publicist, conductor and music teacher.

== Life and career ==
Helmers Pavasars was born on 19 May 1903 in Lejasciems, Gulbene County, into the family of a pastor, Eduards Pavasars. When Pavasars was three years old, his family moved to Valmiera where he studied at the Valmiera Music School.

In 1928, he graduated from the special theory and composition class taught by Jāzeps Vītols at the Latvian Conservatoire with a bachelor's degree. In 1930 he graduated from the violin class of Ādolfs Mecs, and in 1938 from the conducting class of Jānis Mediņš.

At the end of the Second World War in 1944, he fled to Germany, where he later worked as a lecturer at the Baltic University in Pinneberg, Germany. He worked as a choir conductor and organist, mainly in Hamburg. In 1954, he began his career as an organist in London, and was the chief conductor at the English-Latvian Song Days (1958, 1961, 1967), as well as the 1st European Latvian Song Festival in Hamburg (1964).

In 1990, he took part in the 20th General Latvian Song Festival in Riga and received an honorary professorship at the Latvian Academy of Music.

He died in London on 12 June 1998, and his cremated remains were reinterred to Valmiera on 15 May 1999.

=== Works ===
==== Vocal music ====
Approximately 80 choral songs, 4 cantatas and around 40 solo songs.

==== Instrumental music ====
2 string quartets, "Concertino" for violin and piano.

==== Symphonic music ====
Concerto for violin and orchestra (1964).

=== Awards ===
Helmers Pavasars Choir songs were awarded prizes in the Latvian Song Festival Society's competition for new choral works before the 9th Song Festival in 1938.
