= Violin Concerto (Fauré) =

Violin concerto by Gabriel Fauré

- by Gabriel Fauré
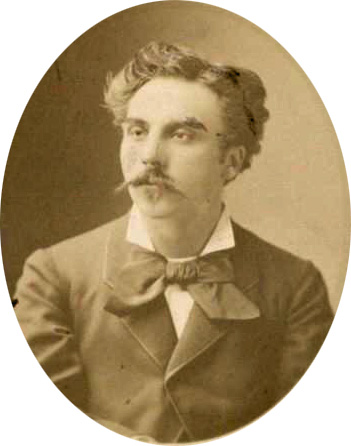
- Fauré in 1875
- Key: D minor
- Opus: 14
- Composed: 1878–1879
- Movements: three (two completed)
- Scoring: violin and orchestra

Premiere
- Date: 12 April 1880
- Conductor: Édouard Colonne
- Performers: Ovide Musin

The Violin Concerto in D minor, Op. 14, is an unfinished violin concerto by Gabriel Fauré, who worked on it between 1878 and 1879. Of the two completed movements, only the first survives.

== Background ==
Following the success of his first violin sonata, Fauré intended to compose a violin concerto for his friend Ovide Musin. The second movement, Andante, was completed first, and was premiered in a piano arrangement by Musin and André Messager at the Société nationale de musique on 28 December 1878. In summer 1879, Fauré wrote to Pauline Viardot that he was happy with the progress of the concerto and had material for the last movement, though he would never complete it.

The first and second movements were premiered on 12 April 1880 with Musin as the soloist and Édouard Colonne conducting. A contemporary reviewer for the Revue et gazette musicale de Paris admired the "inventive" second movement, describing it "full of charm and passion", but counselled Fauré to rework or abandon the "dull and monotonous" opening Allegro.

Like his two abandoned symphonies, Fauré would reuse the material in later works. Themes from the first movement were incorporated into his string quartet that was completed more than forty years later. Fauré also reworked the second movement into the Andante for violin and piano, Op. 75, which was published in 1897.

The first movement was first published by Boccaccini & Spada in 1985. The second movement appears to have been destroyed by Fauré himself no later than 1924 – he wrote to his wife in October: "When I get back to Paris I shall spend a little time each day giving you all my sketches and drafts and everything else of which I want nothing to survive after me, so that you can burn them."

== Structure ==
External audio
- I. Allegro, performed by Jean-Marc Phillips-Varjabedian with the Bretagne Orchestra under Moshe Atzmon
- Andante, Op. 75, performed by Daniel Hope and Simon Crawford-Phillips

Fauré intended for the violin concerto to include three movements:

1. Allegro
2. Andante (destroyed – reworked into the Andante, Op. 75)
3. [Finale] (never completed)
