= Romance No. 1 (Beethoven) =

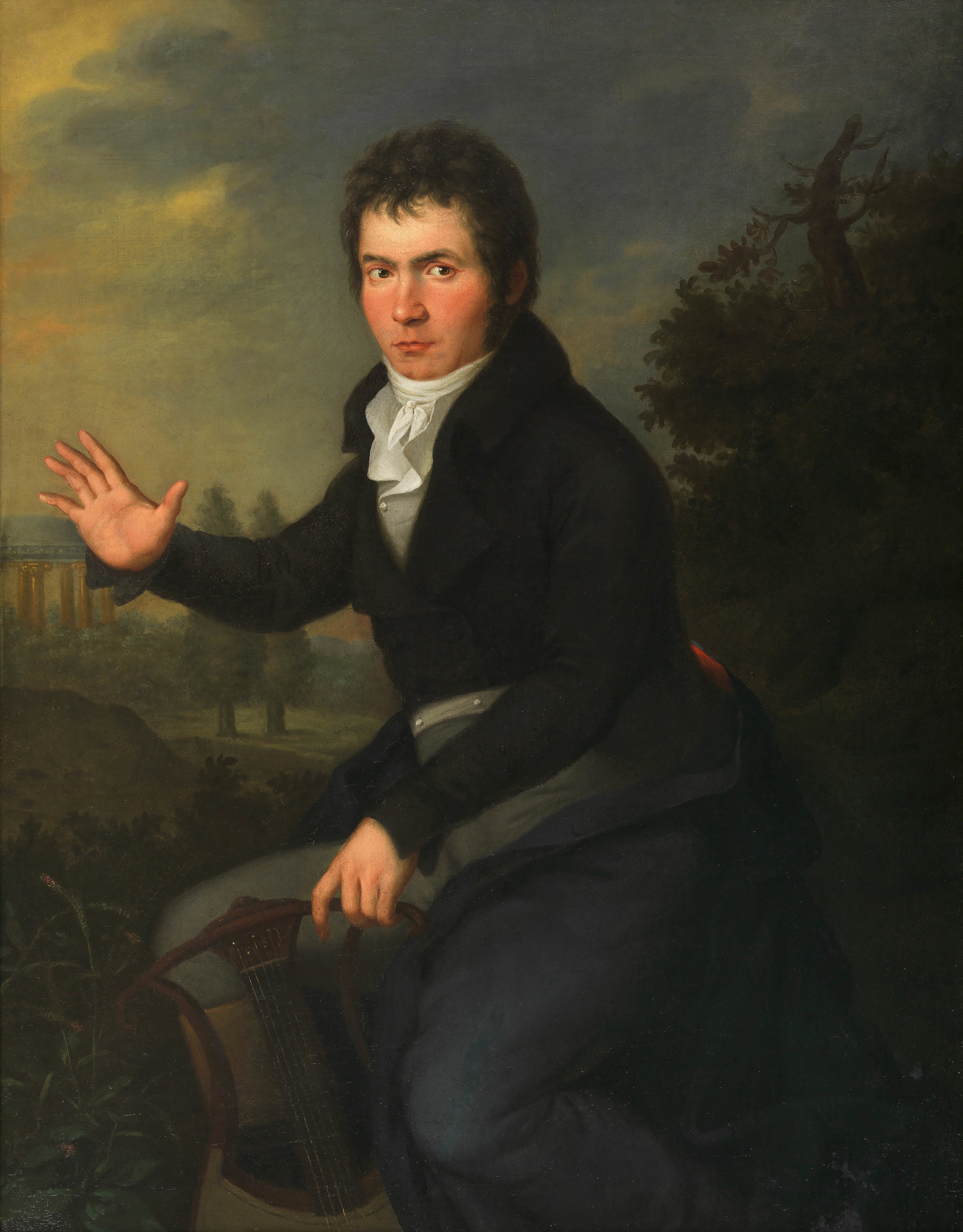
Portrait of Ludwig van Beethoven (age 33) by Joseph Willibrord Mähler (c. 1804)

The Romance No. 1 for violin and orchestra in G major, Op. 40, was composed by Ludwig van Beethoven, one of two such compositions, the other being Romance No. 2 in F major, Op. 50. It was written about 1801, after the second Romance, and was published in 1803, two years before the publication of the second. Thus, this romance was designated as Beethoven's first.

The Romance, Op. 40, is scored for violin solo and an orchestra of strings, two oboes, two bassoons, two horns and flute. The duration is about 8 minutes.

The unaccompanied opening bars for the solo violin
