= Légende (Wieniawski) =

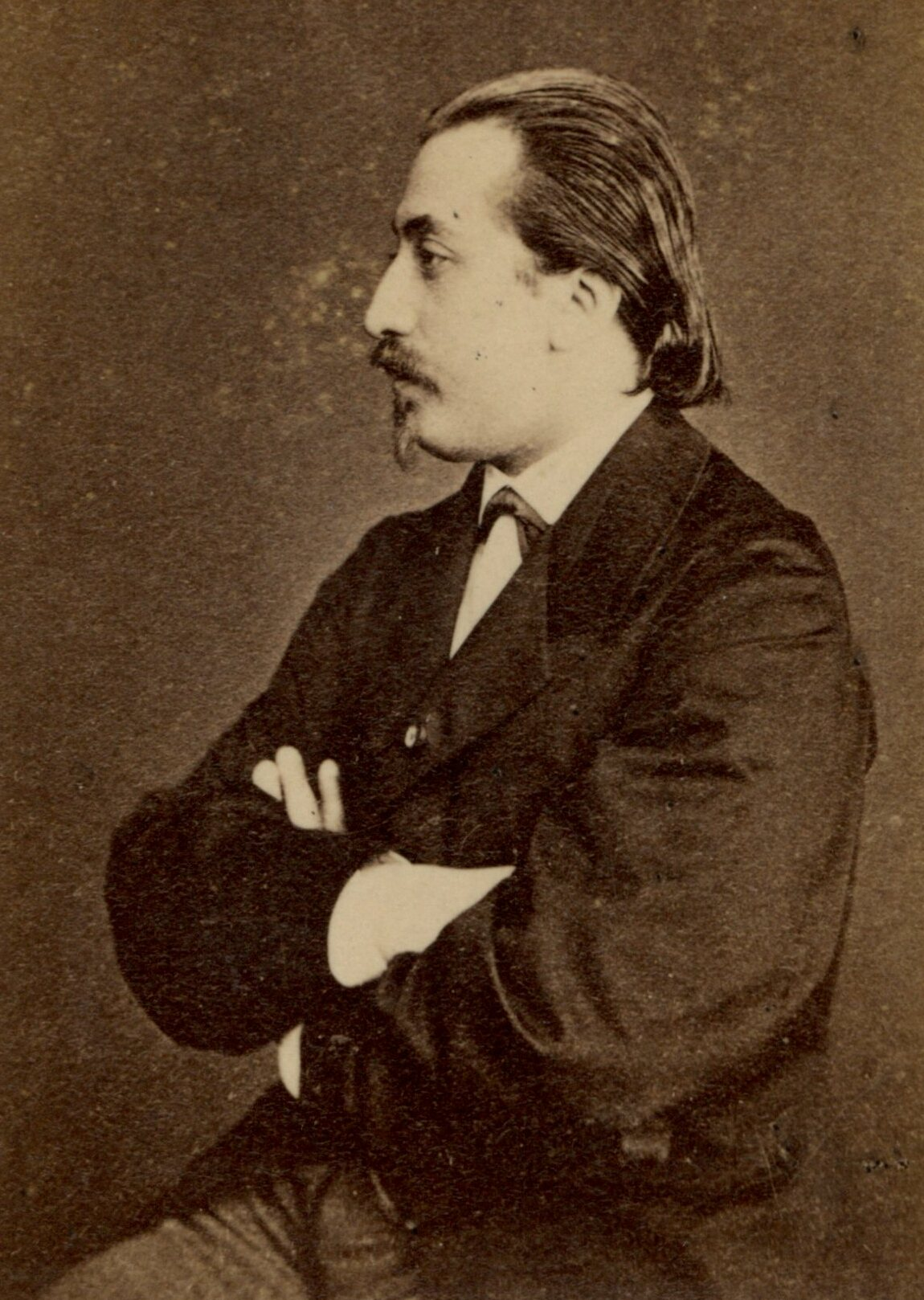
Henryk Wieniawski

Légende Op. 17 is a showpiece by the Polish violin virtuoso Henryk Wieniawski, written for solo violin and orchestral accompaniment, though it is often performed using a piano reduction as a substitute for the orchestra. It is estimated to have been written in about 1860, though the exact date is unknown.

Wieniawski’s Légende was instrumental in helping to secure his engagement to Isabella Hampton. Initially, Isabella’s parents did not approve of their daughter’s engagement to Wieniawski, but after they heard the piece, they were so impressed that they offered the young couple their blessing, and they were married in 1860.

== Structure and Analysis ==
The showpiece can be divided into three main sections, loosely following an ABA format. Légende Op. 17 is in G minor, but the middle section is in the major mode. It is in 3/4 time. The mood is set from the start with a low melody in the horns, accompanied by delicate pizzicato (plucking) in the string sections. After the brief orchestral introduction, the solo violin part enters, with a soft, simple melodic line. As the piece progresses, Wieniawski intensifies the music by having the orchestral strings switch from pizzicato to arco (bowed) and by adding embellishments and turns to the solo violin part. Wieniawski further intensifies the solo violin part through usage of double stops. Within the first section, the main theme repeats itself, with the same orchestral music of the beginning of the piece serving as an interlude-like return to the repeat of the violin theme. In the repeat of the theme, the orchestral texture is varied slightly, with much more usage of pizzicato in the strings. At the end of the first section, the violin part imitates the opening melody of the horn section.

A significant cadence is reached on the tonic G, and the second section begins, this time in the major mode. The overall mood of the piece changes here, as the meter changes to duple and the tempo increases. The orchestra plays a march-like motif underneath the solo violin part, which has a swift, moving part full of double stops and chords. The playful mood is further enhanced by the violinist's usage of slides. Throughout this section, Wieniawski includes brief passages in the minor mode to foreshadow the eventual return to it in the last section. The orchestral and solo violin parts both create a long crescendo as the musical line ascends and intensifies. At the climax, the violin plays a rapid descending chromatic scale, and upon reaching the bottom, the music transitions back into the opening minor theme, again in 3/4 time.

At the start of the third section, the opening horn melody returns. After another brief orchestral interlude, the violin theme of the beginning returns. The violin part recapitulates the melody, and then executes scalar and arpeggio passages all the while making a decrescendo, ending softly on a high G (three octaves above middle C).
