= Violin Concerto (Ponce) =

Concerto by Manuel Ponce

Manuel Ponce's Violin Concerto was composed in 1943 and premiered on August 20 by violinist Henryk Szeryng and the Mexico Symphony conducted by Ponce's former pupil Carlos Chávez. It was the last of his three concertos (the other ones for guitar, and for piano), written five years before his death. It lasts about 30 minutes and consists of an eclectic Allegro, a lyrical Andante discreetly quoting his 1910 song Estrellita and a joyful Vivo. Mexican dance elements are integrated in the first movement's framework and evident in the finale.

1. Allegro non troppo
2. Andante espressivo
3. Vivo giocoso

== Discography ==
- Henryk Szeryng // Polish National Radio Symphony — Jan Krenz. Prelude.
- Henryk Szeryng // Colonne Concerts Orchestra — Ernest Bour. Odeon, 1951.
- Henryk Szeryng // Royal Philharmonic — Enrique Bátiz. EMI, 1985
- Miranda Cuckson // Czech National Symphony — Paul Freeman. Centaur, 1999
