= Violin Concerto No. 3 (Thomas) =

Composition by Augusta Read Thomas

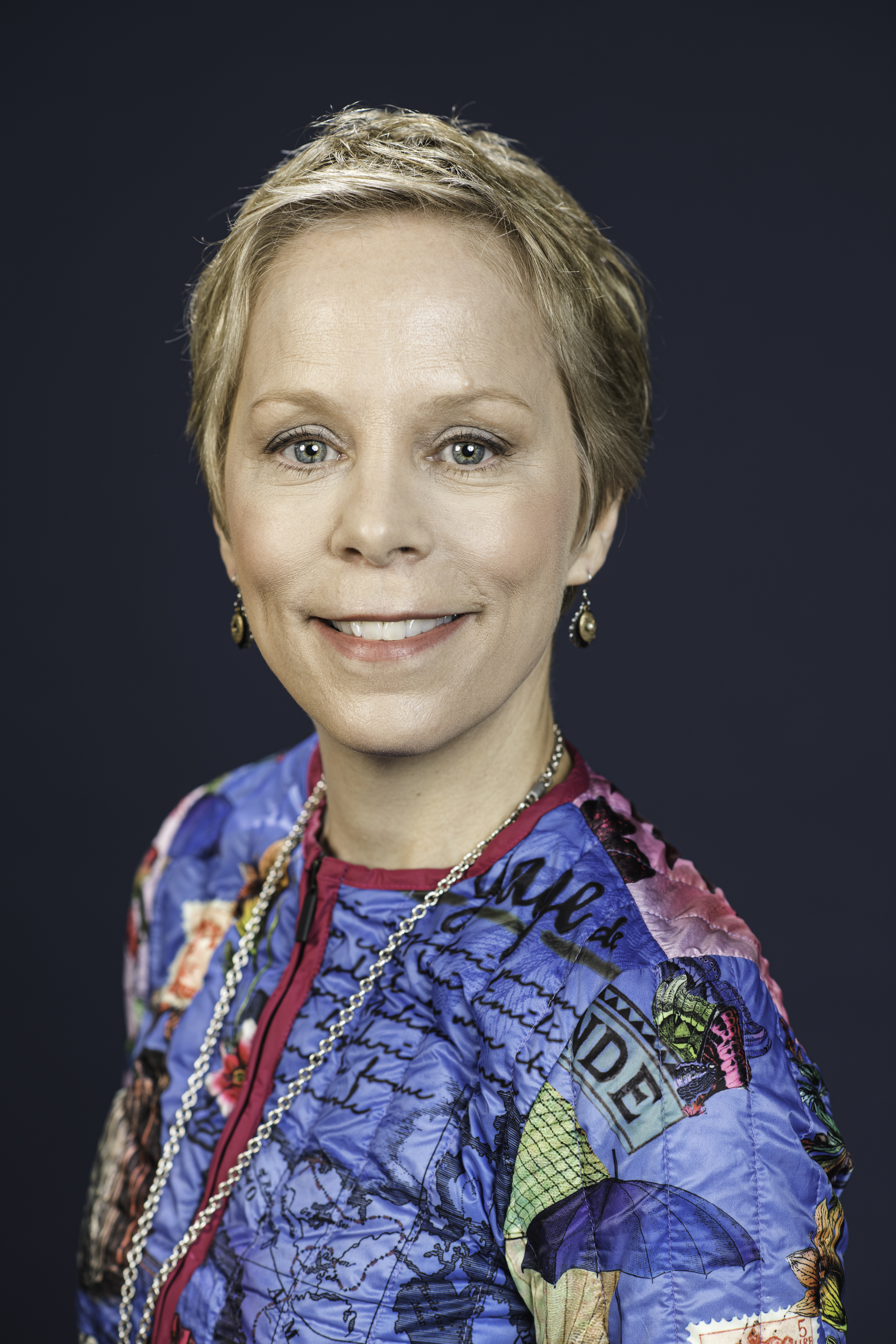
Augusta Read Thomas in 2020

The Violin Concerto No. 3, Juggler in Paradise is a composition for violin solo and orchestra by the American composer Augusta Read Thomas. The work was jointly commissioned by Radio France, The Proms, and the National Symphony Orchestra with contributions from Bill and Solange Brown. It was first performed on January 16, 2009, at the Salle Pleyel, Paris by the violinist Frank Peter Zimmermann and the Orchestre philharmonique de Radio France under the conductor Andrey Boreyko.

== Composition ==
The concerto has a duration of roughly 19 minutes and is composed in a single movement. Thomas described the work in the score program notes, writing, "Flowering across a 20-minute arch, Violin Concerto No. 3, can be thought of as a series of poetic outgrowths and variations, which are organic and, at every level, concerned with transformations and connections. The violin solo is present for almost 100% of the sweeping arc, serving as the protagonist as well as fulcrum point on and around which all musical force-fields rotate, bloom and proliferate." She added:

The work's subtitle, "Juggler in Paradise" is a poetic image for the way solo and orchestra relate, a continuous rhapsodic cadenza set against colorful 'paradisiacal constellations'. It's physical, too: dance is often close by. When the violin starts to speed up, the score suggests playing 'as if "juggling" the notes, rhythms, articulations'; and further on, 'like several objects in motion, in the air'. The animated, quicksilver orchestrations, at times pointillist like a Seurat paining [sic], at other times akin to bold brush strokes, full and brassy, are continuously juggling and flexibly rearranging.

=== Instrumentation ===
The work is scored for solo violin and a large orchestra comprising piccolo, two flutes (doubling alto flute), two oboes, cor anglais, two clarinets, bass clarinet, bassoon, contrabassoon, four horns, four trumpets, two trombones, bass trombone, tuba, six percussionists, piano, celesta, two harps, and strings.

== Reception ==
Reviewing the North American premiere by the violinist Jennifer Koh and the National Symphony Orchestra in Washington, D.C., on June 9, 2011, Anne Midgette of The Washington Post praised the concerto, despite noting a lukewarm reception by the audience. She wrote, "Augusta Read Thomas writes music that is dense and smart but also listenable. Thick with complex rhythms, bright with textures, dappled with particular shades of dissonance alternating with snatches of melody, it doesn’t blatantly try to seduce the hearer, but it doesn’t want to be off-putting, either." The work was also lauded by Tim Smith of The Baltimore Sun who wrote, "Structured in a single, 20-minute span, the vividly orchestrated score 'juggles' ideas and rhythms to create an absorbing dialogue between soloist and orchestra. There's a lot of jaunty, pointillistic writing that gradually builds up to what suggests Bernstein's jazziest dances from West Side Story—but on speed."

Mike Paarlberg of the Washington City Paper was more critical, however, remarking, "Like too many contemporary classical composers, Thomas substitutes mood for melody, that mood usually being either whimsy or anxiety. (Thomas manages to straddle both.) It begins with a languid violin line that picks up jarring interjections from the orchestra haphazardly, like raindrops on a tin roof. The concerto evokes the score of an Alfred Hitchcock movie, whereas its unfortunate title, Juggler in Paradise, brings to mind Jimmy Buffett."
