= Violin Concerto No. 6 (Mozart) =

Violin concerto in three movements by Johann Friedrich Eck, misattributed to Mozart

Violin Concerto in E♭ major
- by Johann Friedrich Eck
- Key: E-flat major
- Catalogue: K. 268/365b/Anh.C. 14.04
- Movements: Three (Allegro moderato, Un poco Adagio, Rondo: Allegretto)
- Scoring: Violin; orchestra

The so-called Violin Concerto No. 6 in E♭ major, K. 268/365b/Anh.C. 14.04, was once thought to have been composed by Wolfgang Amadeus Mozart, but is now considered to be the work of Johann Friedrich Eck (1767–1838).

== Structure ==
The concerto has the usual fast-slow-fast structure and lasts around 23 minutes. The movements are:

1. Allegro moderato
2. Un poco adagio
3. Rondo: Allegretto

== Background ==
This violin concerto was first published by Johann André in 1799. A contemporary writer had stated the work to have been composed in 1784 and that it had been played to Eck by Mozart, although Mozart's widow Constanze stated that if authentic, the work must have been composed earlier. Ludwig von Köchel dated the work to 1776 in his catalogue, labelling it K. 268. A common hypothesis made in the later half of the 19th century was that the piece was based on authentic Mozart material but constructed by a less skilled composer. Cecil B. Oldman believed that the work had stylistic similarities to Mozart's sinfonia concertante for violin and viola, K. 364, and that Eck was the completer of the work, writing in a footnote to p. 1469 of The Letters of Mozart and his Family Volume III:

This is the Concerto in E♭ (K. 268), the authenticity of which has so often been debated. As Constanze herself mentions later in the course of this letter, it was first published (in 1799, as Op. 76) by André himself, or, at any rate, by his father, who was head of the firm till his death in June 1799. It was reviewed in the AMZ for October 1799 and curtly dismissed as an incompetent piece of work, which could not possibly be by Mozart. In January 1800 there appeared an answer to this review, in the course of a communication from F. A. Ernst (1745–1805), Konzertmeister to the King of Saxony. It is this to which Constanze here refers. On the strength of Ernst's testimony, which is far from unambiguous but clearly associates the work with Munich and with the Munich violinist Johann Friedrich Eck, the present writer has argued that in the form in which it now survives it represents Eck's working over of Mozartian material, and has suggested 1780–1781 as the date of its composition. See Music & Letters, April 1931, and cp. Köchel, pp. 435, 436.

Donald Francis Tovey in his Essays in Musical Analysis (Concertos) of 1936 commented, "The Concerto in E flat, which is the most frequently played, and purports to be the sixth, may be based on genuine material, but no competent musical scholar believes that it can possibly be genuine in the form in which it is known to us." However, since then, performances in the concert hall and on disc have become infrequent compared to the five authentic Mozart violin concertos.

Alfred Einstein dated the work to 1780 in his third edition of the Köchel catalogue, renumbering it as K. 365b. In a 1978 comparison of this concerto with several known Eck violin concertos, Walter Lebermann confirmed the work's probable attribution to Eck and gave a dating of before 1790. The 1980 sixth edition of the Köchel catalogue removed this concerto from the main catalogue and into the appendix for spurious and doubtful works as K. Anh.C 14.04, and the work is not included in the Neue Mozart-Ausgabe.
