= Violin Concerto No. 3 (Bruch) =

Composition by Max Bruch

Violin Concerto
- by Max Bruch
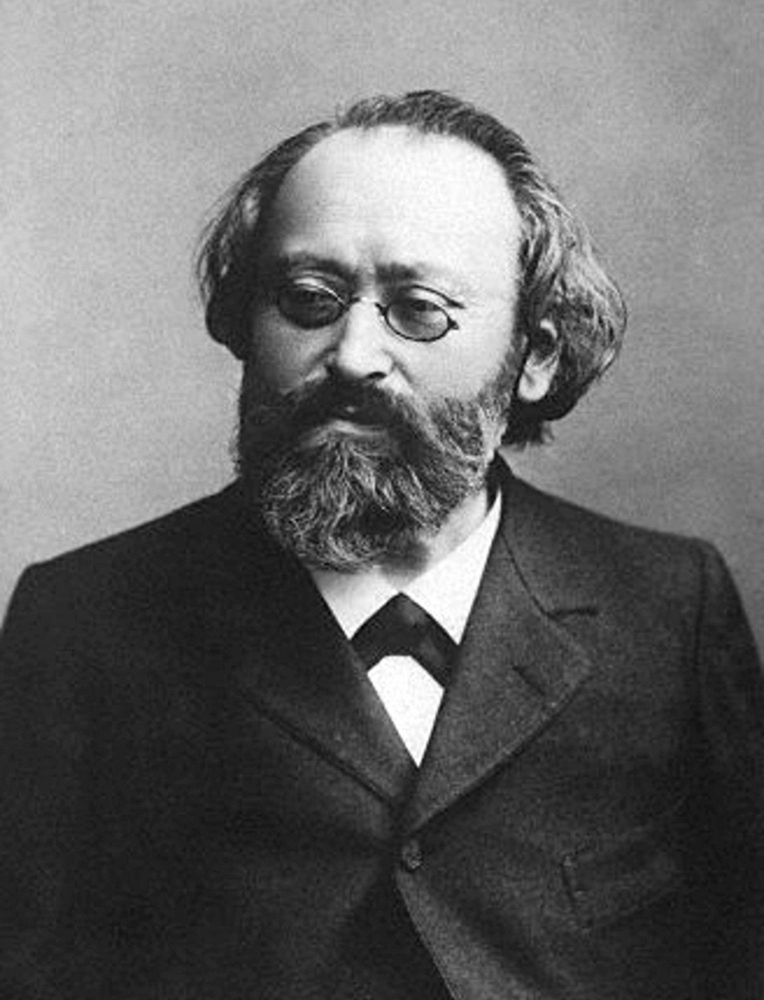
- Key: D minor
- Opus: 58
- Period: Romantic
- Genre: Concerto
- Composed: 1891
- Movements: 3
- Scoring: Violin & Orchestra

Premiere
- Date: 31 May 1891

Max Bruch's Violin Concerto No. 3 in D minor, Op. 58, was composed in 1891 and dedicated to the violinist/composer Joseph Joachim, who had persuaded him to expand a single movement concert piece into a full violin concerto.

It has never attained the same prominence as the G minor concerto.

== Description ==
In 1891 Bruch composed his Violin Concerto No. 3 in D minor, Op. 58, which was dedicated to his friend (and superior at the Berlin Academy of Music) the violinist/composer Joseph Joachim, who had persuaded him to expand what had started out as a single movement concert piece into a full violin concerto. Joachim was the soloist at the work's premiere, in Düsseldorf on 31 May 1891.

Despite being advocated by Joachim and Pablo de Sarasate, the concerto, which differed from its predecessors in its adherence to traditional classical structures, never attained the same prominence as the G minor concerto.

In recent years the concerto has been described as "...a musical unicorn: since it has almost never been played, its existence is for many the stuff only of musicological folklore." Program notes for a 2013 performance of the G minor concerto by the Atlanta Symphony Orchestra even denied the existence of the concerto, stating that Bruch had composed only two violin concertos, the G minor concerto and the D minor concerto composed for Sarasate.

== Structure ==
External audio
- Performed by Salvatore Accardo with the Leipzig Gewandhaus Orchestra under Kurt Masur
- I. Allegro energico
- II. Adagio
- III. Finale (Allegro molto)

The concerto has three movements:

1. Allegro energico
2. Adagio
3. Finale: Allegro molto

A typical performance lasts around 38 minutes.
