= Violin Concerto No. 3 (Mozart) =

1775 violin concerto by W. A. Mozart

- Strasbourg
- by W. A. Mozart
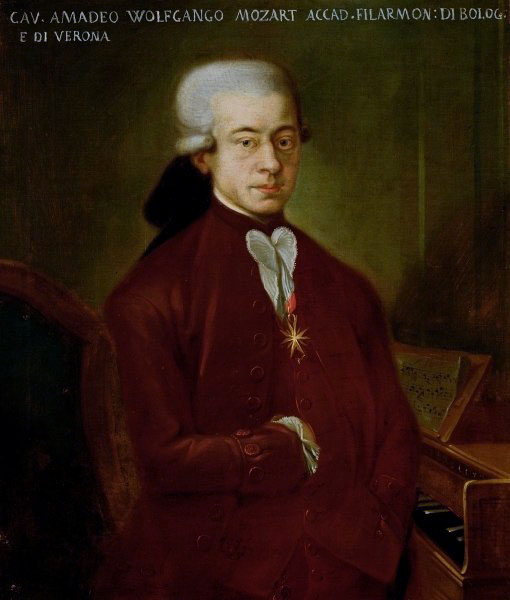
- Mozart in 1777
- Other name: Straßburg-Concert
- Key: G major
- Catalogue: K. 216
- Composed: 1775
- Movements: Three (Allegro, Adagio, Rondeau)
- Scoring: Violin; orchestra

The Violin Concerto No. 3 in G major, K. 216, was composed by Wolfgang Amadeus Mozart in Salzburg in 1775 when he was 19 years old. In a letter to his father, Mozart called it the "Strasbourg Concerto". Researchers believe this epithet comes from the motive in the third movement's Allegretto in the central section, a local dance that already had appeared as a musette-imitating tune in a symphony by Carl Ditters von Dittersdorf.

== Instrumentation ==
The work is scored for solo violin, two flutes (second movement only), two oboes (tacet in the second movement), two horns in G and D, and strings.

== Movements ==
The piece is in three movements:

1. Allegro
2. Adagio in D major
3. Rondeau: Allegro-Andate-Allegretto-Tempo I

=== I. Allegro ===
The Allegro is in sonata form, opening with a G major theme played by the orchestra. The first theme takes up the orchestral ritornello similar to Aminta's aria "Aer tranquillo e dì sereni" from Mozart's opera Il re pastore. The main theme is a bright and happy discussion between the solo violin and the accompaniment, followed by a modulation to the dominant D major, then to its parallel key D minor. It experiments in other keys, but does not settle and eventually, heads back to the tonic, G major, in the recapitulation.

=== II. Adagio ===
The second movement is in ternary form in the dominant key of D major. The orchestra begins with the main theme, which the violin imitates one octave higher. The winds then play a dance-like motif in A major, which the violin concludes. The violin restates the main theme in A major, although the melody features A sharp instead of A natural, creating a brief modulation to B minor. It soon modulates back to A major, then to the home key of D major through the main theme. After the cadenza, the violin plays the main theme again, thus concluding the movement in D.

This is the only movement in any of the five violin concertos by Mozart where a pair of flutes are used instead of oboes.

=== III. Rondeau ===
The finale is a rondo in G major and in 3/8 time. Mozart inserts into the rondo a short G minor Andante section followed by a longer G major Allegretto section, both in cut time.

== Recordings ==
Year	Violin	Conductor	Orchestra	Record company	Format
1935	Yehudi Menuhin	George Enescu	Orchestre symphonique de Paris	EMI Records	Multiple
1959	Joseph Fuchs	Eugene Goossens	London Symphony Orchestra	Everest Records	Vinyl
1962	Arthur Grumiaux	Colin Davis	London Symphony Orchestra	Philips Records	Vinyl
1969	Henryk Szeryng	Alexander Gibson	New Philharmonia Orchestra	Philips Records	Multiple
1971	David Oistrakh	David Oistrakh	Berlin Philharmonic	EMI Records	Multiple
1978, Feb. 13-19	Anne-Sophie Mutter	Herbert von Karajan	Berlin Philharmonic	Deutsche Grammophon	Multiple
1983	Itzhak Perlman	James Levine	Vienna Philharmonic	Deutsche Grammophon	Multiple
1987	Takako Nishizaki	Stephen Gunzenhauser	Cappella Istropolitana	Naxos Records	CD
1989	Franco Gulli	Bruno Giuranna	Orchestra da Camera di Padova e del Veneto	Claves	CD
2007	Hilary Hahn	Gustavo Dudamel	Stuttgart Radio Symphony Orchestra	Deutsche Grammophon	Multiple
2016	Isabelle Faust	Giovanni Antonini	Il Giardino Armonico	Harmonia Mundi	CD
2021	Viktoria Mullova	Oliver Zeffman	Academy of St Martin in the Fields	Platoon	Digital
