= Serenade (Bruch) =

1899 composition by Max Bruch

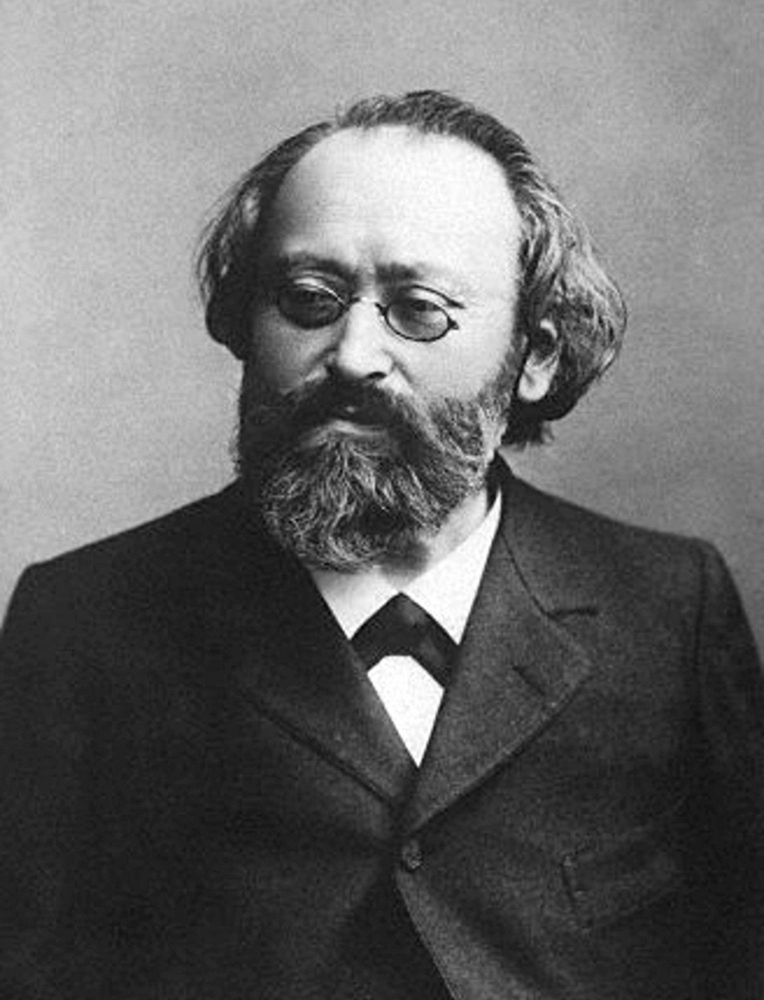
Max Bruch

Max Bruch's Serenade in A minor, Op. 75 is a composition for violin and orchestra that was composed in Cologne in 1899.

== Structure ==
The work has four movements and takes approximately 35 to 40 minutes to perform:

1. Andante con moto
2. Allegro moderato, alla marcia
3. Notturno
4. Allegro energico e vivace
