= Adagio in E for Violin and Orchestra (Mozart) =

1776 composition by W. A. Mozart

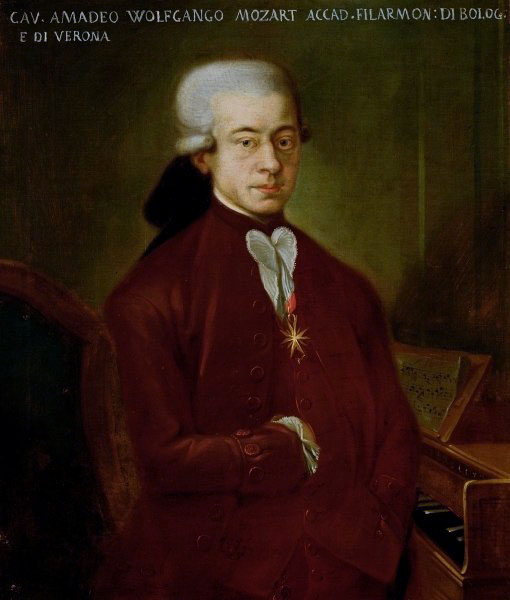
1777 portrait of Mozart

The Adagio in E major for Violin and Orchestra, K. 261, was composed by Wolfgang Amadeus Mozart in 1776. It was probably a replacement movement for the original slow movement of his Violin Concerto No. 5 in A. Mozart wrote it specifically for the violinist Antonio Brunetti, because, as Mozart's father Leopold noted in a letter, the original movement was 'too studied' for Brunettle's liking.

The work is scored for solo violin, two flutes, two horns in E and strings.

It is one of the few compositions Mozart wrote in the key of E major along with the Piano Trio No. 4, K. 542; the incomplete Horn Concerto, K. 494a; and the incomplete fugue, Anh. C27.10.
