= Violin Concerto No. 5 (Mozart) =

1775 composition by W. A. Mozart

- Turkish
- by W. A. Mozart
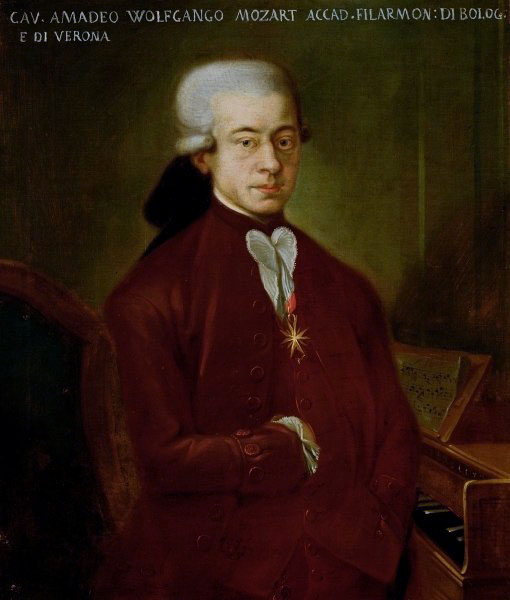
- 1777 portrait of Mozart
- Key: A major
- Catalogue: K. 219
- Composed: 1775
- Movements: Three (Allegro aperto – Adagio – Allegro aperto, Adagio, Rondeau – Tempo di minuetto)
- Scoring: Violin; orchestra

The Violin Concerto No. 5 in A major, K. 219, often called by the nickname "Turkish", was written by Wolfgang Amadeus Mozart in 1775, premiering during the Christmas season that year in Salzburg. It follows the typical fast–slow–fast musical structure with certain deviations from the main tempo in the outer movements.

== Background ==
Mozart composed most of his concertos for string instruments from 1773 to 1779, but it is unknown for whom or what occasion. Similarly, the dating of these works is unclear. Analysis of the handwriting, papers and watermarks has proved that all five violin concertos were redated several times. The year of composition of the fifth concerto "1775" was scratched out and replaced by "1780", and later changed back to "1775". Mozart did not use the key of A major for a concerto again until the Piano Concerto No. 12, K. 414.

The autograph score is preserved in the Library of Congress.

== Structure ==
1. Allegro aperto – Adagio – Allegro aperto
Arranged for violin and piano. Performed by Ben Goldstein (violin) and Bendik Eide (piano)

The concerto is scored for two oboes, two horns in A (in E for Adagio), and strings.

The movements are as follows:

1. Allegro aperto – Adagio – Allegro aperto
2. Adagio (E major)
3. Rondeau: Tempo di Menuetto – Allegro – Tempo di Menuetto

The aperto marking on the first movement is rare in Mozart's instrumental music (two of his piano concerti, Piano Concerto No. 6 in B♭ major, K. 239 and No. 8 in C major, K. 246, have this marking, as does his Oboe Concerto in C major, K. 314, but it appears much more frequently in his operas. It implies that the piece should be played in a broader, more majestic way than might be indicated simply by allegro. The first movement opens with the orchestra playing the main theme, a typical Mozartian tune. The solo violin comes in with a short but sweet dolce adagio passage in A major with a simple accompaniment by the orchestra. (This is the only instance in Mozart's concerto repertoire in which an adagio interlude of this sort occurs at the first soloist entry of the concerto.) It then transitions back to the main theme with the solo violin playing a different melody on top of the orchestra. The first movement is 10–11 minutes long.

The rondo finale is based on a minuet theme that recurs several times. In the middle of the movement the meter changes from 3/4 to 2/4 and a section of "Turkish music" is played. This is characterised by a shift to A minor and the use of grotesque elements, such as unison chromatic crescendos, repetition of very short musical elements and col legno playing in the cellos and double basses. This section gave the concerto the nickname "The Turkish Concerto". The "Rondo alla Turca" from Mozart's Piano Sonata No. 11, K. 331, features the same key and similar elements.

Mozart later composed the Adagio in E major for Violin and Orchestra, K. 261, as a substitute slow movement for this concerto.

A typical performance lasts about 28 minutes. It is his longest violin concerto.
