= Violin Concerto No. 3 (Paganini) =

1826 composition by Niccolò Paganini

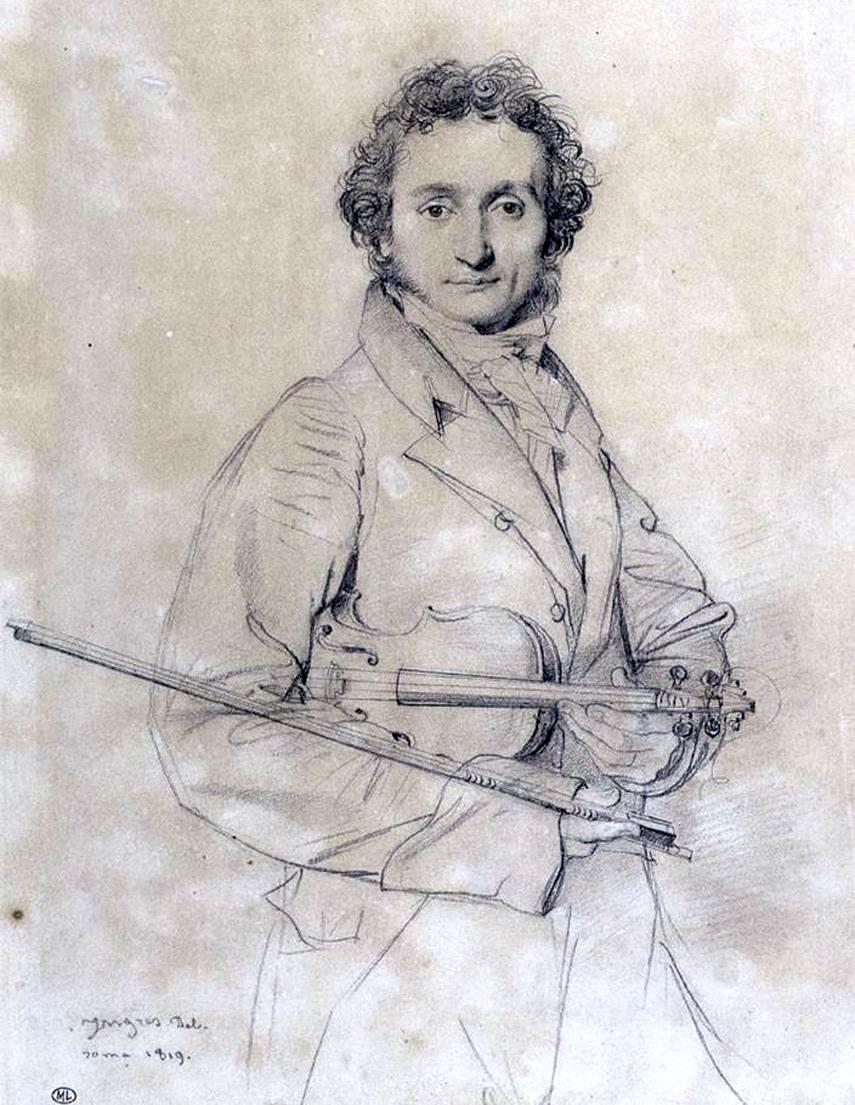
Niccolò Paganini, 1819

The Violin Concerto No. 3 in E major was composed by Niccolò Paganini in 1826. On 12 December 1826, Paganini wrote from Naples to his friend L. G. Germi that, having recently completed his Second Violin Concerto, he had now "finished orchestrating a third with a Polacca", and added: "I would like to try these concertos out on my own countrymen before producing them in Vienna, London and Paris." In the event, the Third Violin Concerto does not seem to have been premiered until July 1828 in Vienna. After Paganini's death in 1840, it was not performed again for more than a century, until it was rediscovered in the late 1960s and first recorded and publicly performed by Henryk Szeryng in 1971.

== Structure ==
The concerto is in three movements:

1. Introduzione. Andantino – Allegro marziale (in E major)
2. Adagio. Cantabile spianato (in A major)
3. Polacca. Andantino vivace (in E major)

== Instrumentation ==
The piece is originally scored for two violins, viola, cello, contrabass, flute, two clarinets, two oboes, bassoon, two horns, two trumpets, and trombone. Some of these instruments are marked as being obligatory in the score, whereas some are marked as optional.

== Notable recordings ==
- Henryk Szeryng with the London Symphony Orchestra, Alexander Gibson conducting
- Salvatore Accardo with the London Philharmonic Orchestra, Charles Dutoit conducting
- Ernő Rózsa with the Slovak Radio Symphony Orchestra, Michael Dittrich conducting
