= Violin Concerto No. 3 (Haydn) =

Violin concerto by Joseph Haydn

The Violin Concerto No. 3 in A major (Hob. VIIa/3) ("Melker Konzert") was composed by Joseph Haydn probably between 1765 and 1770.
