= Antonio Brunetti =

Italian violinist (1744–1786)

Antonio Brunetti (1744 – December 26, 1786) was an Italian violinist.

Born in Naples, Brunetti took Mozart's position in Count Hieronymus von Colloredo's Salzburg court orchestra in 1776, after Mozart relinquished the place. Brunetti became the Salzburg concertmaster in 1777. He was the son of composer Giovan Gualberto Brunetti; otherwise, little is known of his life, but he was friends with Mozart, who wrote pieces for him to play. However, he was also regarded in Mozart's letter of 9 July 1778 as a "thoroughly ill-bred fellow" and in a later one (11 April 1781) as "that coarse and dirty Brunetti who is a disgrace to his master, to himself and to the whole orchestra."

In November 1778, he married Maria Josepha Judith Lipp, daughter of the organist Franz Ignaz Lipp and sister-in-law of Michael Haydn, by whom he had a son earlier that year. Brunetti died in Salzburg.
