= Mabel Louisa Dean Paul =

British noblewoman and socialite

Mabel Louisa Dean Paul (1872–9 July 1919) was an English novelist and prominent Edwardian socialite, widely regarded as one of the most glamorous women in British high society. Celebrated for her beauty, wit, and literary ambitions, she became a frequent subject of press fascination and public scrutiny owing to her turbulent private life. Throughout the Edwardian period, her name appeared repeatedly in fashionable Society lawsuits and scandals that attracted intense newspaper attention. She was divorced by her first husband, Colonel Thomas James Atherton (1856–1920), following an adulterous scandal involving Hugh Grosvenor, 2nd Duke of Westminster (1879–1953).

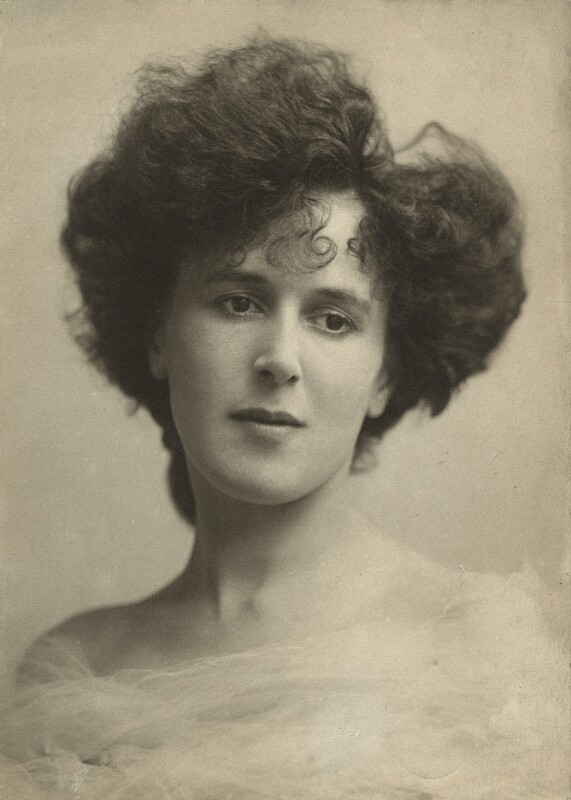
Mabel Louisa Dean Paul by George Charles Beresford. 1902. Credit: National Portrait Gallery, London

== Early life ==
Mabel Louisa Dean Paul was the daughter of Edward J. Dean Paul, 4th baronet (died 1895), and his second wife, Elisa Monckton Ramsay, the daughter of Major General James Ramsey, the younger brother of George Ramsay, 12th Earl of Dalhousie.

== Public figure ==
Mabel Louisa Dean Paul, later known as Mabel Louisa Eliot, has been described by many contemporaries as a celebrated society beauty. Tall and slender, exquisitely gowned, and frequently displaying priceless jewels in public, she was referred to by the London press as "the beautiful Mrs. Atherton" and "a fascinating disturber of Society". To those dearest of her friends, she was Nancy, while her novels were published under the pseudonym "Maimie Atherton".

She been described by some as a clever and versatile, with a vivid personality who could dominate any social function. Between 1901 and 1919 much of her private life received public interest and she became more notable for her relationships with royal figures and noblemen. Her looks and personality attracted interest, not seen since Lillie Langtry (1853–1929), a mistress of Edward VII.

During the Boer War, Mabel Louisa Dean Paul — then widely known as Mrs Atherton — emerged as a leading figure among a party of fashionable society women who travelled to Cape Colony with the stated intention of nursing wounded soldiers. Contemporary reports, however, suggested that she attracted equal attention for her conspicuous charm and flirtatious conduct towards British officers, behaviour that caused considerable gossip both within military circles and in the London press. Sir Frederick Treves, 1st Baronet, a distinguished war surgeon, closely associated with the medical treatment of soldiers in the Second Boer War, described the presence of society women such as Mrs Atherton as a plague. In Lord Kitchener's outburst of "women and flies" when describing "ladies of social standing", and women's "war work" of a certain kind, Mrs Atherton's name was freely mentioned. Notwithstanding, such travel for British society women at the time was not without risk. Her younger sister Gladys Dean Paul would die in Matjiesfontein during 1902.

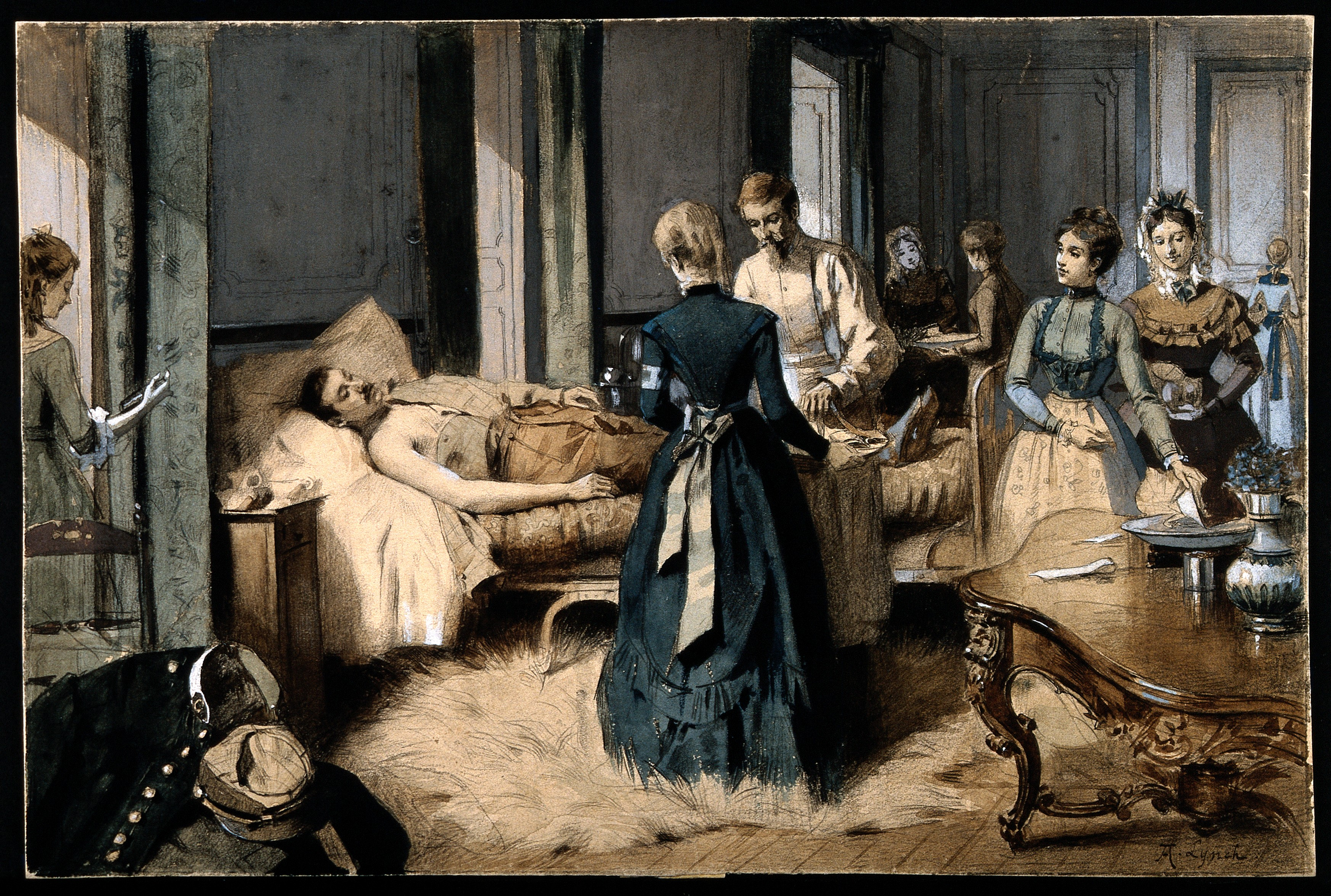
Society women in the Boer War. Coloured pen and pencil drawing by A. Lynch. Credit: Wellcome Library, London

=== The affair with the Duke ===
When Mrs Atherton arrived in Cape Colony in 1899, her husband's regiment was under the Command of Paul Methuen, 3rd Baron Methuen at the Battle of Modder River. Mrs Atherton proceeded there and for some time stayed at the same British Army camp as the 21 year old, Captain Hugh Grosvenor who in 1900 became the 2nd Duke of Westminster. An affair ensued with the Duke, which continued when she reached Cape Town.

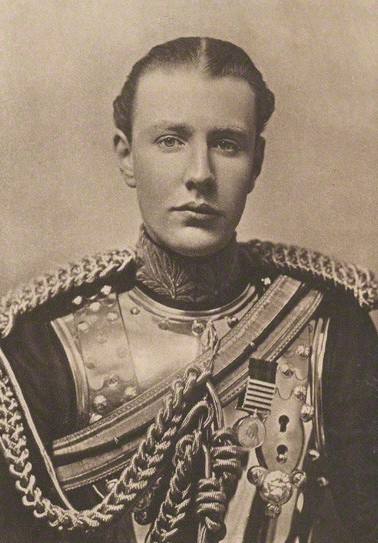
Hugh Grosvenor, 2nd Duke of Westminster

When her husband, Lieutenant-Colonel Atherton was made aware of her adulterous affair, he arranged for her safe passage back to England during October 1900, whilst the Governor of the colony, Alfred Milner ensured that the young Duke was not on the same steamer as Mrs Atherton. Both vessels stopped in Madeira and the adulterous affair with the Duke affectionately known as "Bendor", after his racehorse Bend Or, or "Benny" continued.

Stories of Mrs Atherton's infidelity with the Duke began to circulate in the American newspapers at the end of February 1901. These articles claimed such events had occurred at the Mount Nelson Hotel, when she was a 28 year old London society nurse, who became entangled with a senior peer, whilst her husband was away fighting with his troops in the same War. The American newspapers were far more kinder when describing her age, effectively making her 3 years younger in their coverage of the affair.

Atherton, who at the time was a Lieutenant-Colonel in the British Army, refused a cheque for £40,000 from the Grosvenor family lawyers and filed for divorce. Since the Matrimonial Causes Act 1857, divorce in England was a civil affair, with a civil court in London handling all cases.

The affair was sensationalised in the American newspapers, since Hugh Grosvenor, 2nd Duke of Westminster was named as co-respondent a week after his marriage to another socialite, Constance (Shelagh) Cornwallis-West. The affair was not reported in British newspapers.

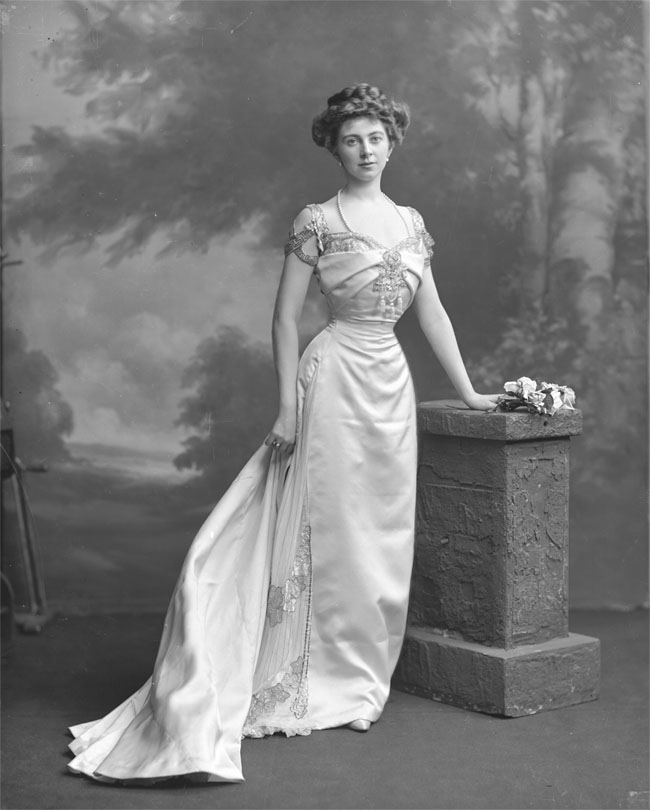
Constance Edwina, Duchess of Westminster

The Duke's mother, Lady Sibell, the Countess Grosvenor and his stepfather, George Wyndham, then Chief Secretary for Ireland, were both a major influence on him. His mother invited Mrs Atherton to tea in an attempt to keep the story of her affair out of the newspapers. However it is King Edward VII who was credited by the society inner circles for ending the Duke of Westminster scandal. This involvement by the new King of the United Kingdom and the British Dominions, and Emperor of India was soon reported in the Australian newspapers. By April 1901, there was much speculation of a money offer to prevent the high-profile case from going to court, which Lieutenant-Colonel Atherton at the time had publicly declined. However, the New Zealand newspapers had reported that in addition to a plea from the British Monarch, many thousands of British pounds had been paid by the Grosvenors for the Atherton's silence.

Mrs Atherton's affair with the Duke of Westminster was never aired in court despite a petition being submitted. The Duke had succeeded in reaching a compromise on the matter, so that the case never went to trial. However it would eventually lead to Lieutenant-Colonel Atherton petitioning for divorce in 1905 on the grounds of adultery, albeit naming someone else, with decree absolute in 1907. Many society spectators made their way to the divorce court on the basis of "Will the man in the South African affair be mentioned?", only to be disappointed that the Duke's was never mentioned by name; simply merely as "a certain gentleman".

=== A lady of some social standing ===
From the time of her first marriage, until her second marriage, she was known as Mrs Atherton or Mabel Atherton. Mrs Atherton was back in London in 1902 and was photographed by George Charles Beresford. Her photographic portrait forms part of the National Portrait Gallery, London collection.

On 6 August 1904 a large full length portrait of Mrs Atherton appeared on page 586 of The King and His Navy and Army magazine. Some newspaper articles have incorrectly referred to her as Mabel Louise. Her official birth record records her name as Mabel Louisa, although to her friends she was known as Nancy.

=== The breach of promise to marry ===
In 1907, Atherton (née Dean Paul) brought an action for breach of promise of a high-profile marriage against Captain John Yarde-Buller (1873–1930), who on 24 April 1907, had married the music hall singer, Denise Orme.

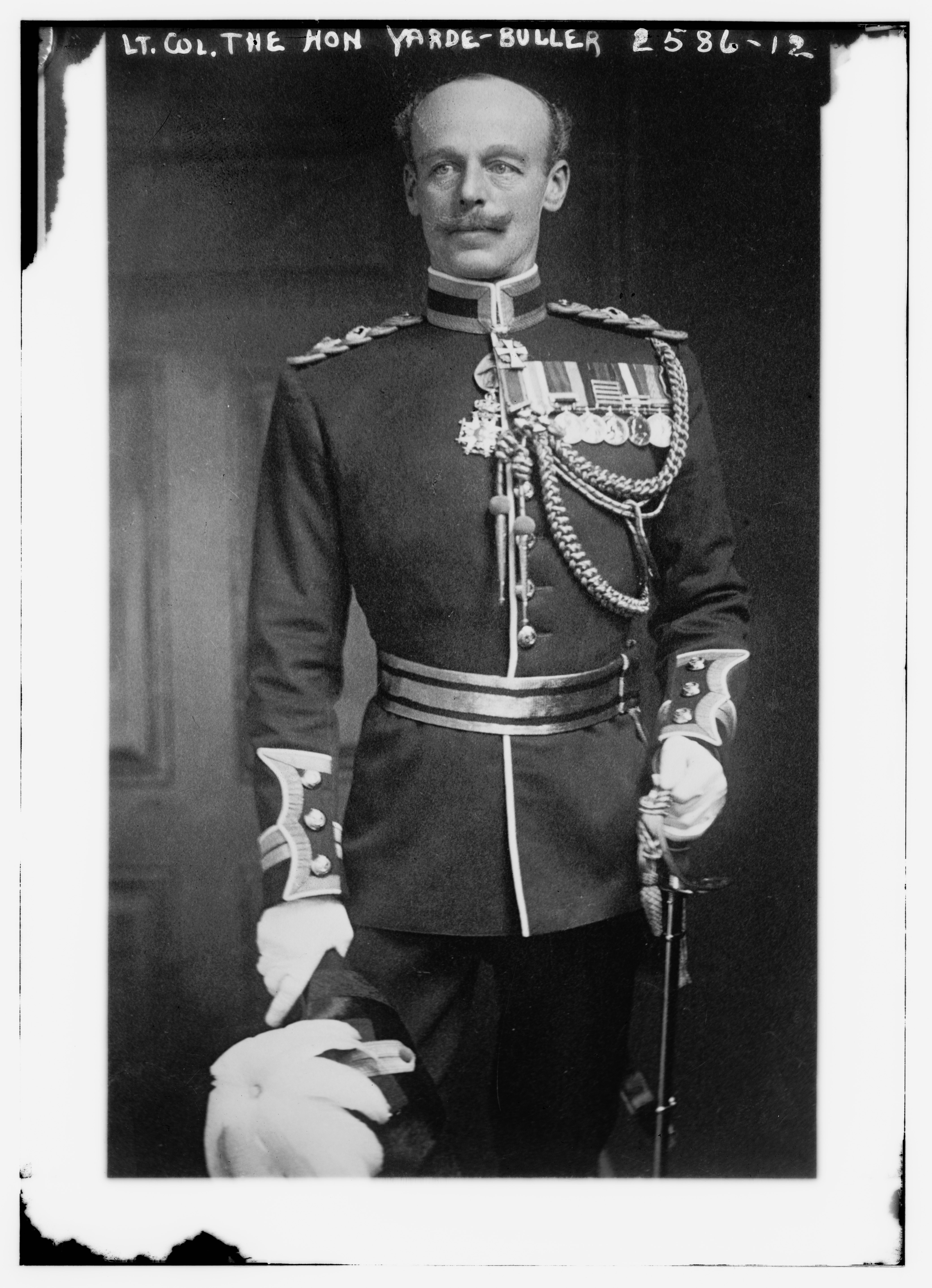
Lt. Col. the Hon. Yarde-Buller

At that time the decree in her divorce suit had not been made absolute, hence Justice Charles Darling proclaimed that it was a question whether the promise had been made while the plaintiff was still a married woman. Mrs Atherton waived her claim for damages and judgment was entered for her, with costs.

=== The affair with Baron Hermann von Eckardstein ===
By 1905, Baron Eckardstein (1864–1933) had marriage woes of his own and his wife had given birth to a child from another man. For a time he was a companion of Mrs Atherton, and he invited her to Germany to meet his mother. Eckardstein had been a diplomat since 1888. His activities were mainly based at the German Embassy in London, and from 1891 until 1902, he held various posts. Finally, from 1902 to 1907 as Counselor and First Secretary, the Baron worked zealously for greater understanding between Germany and his host country.

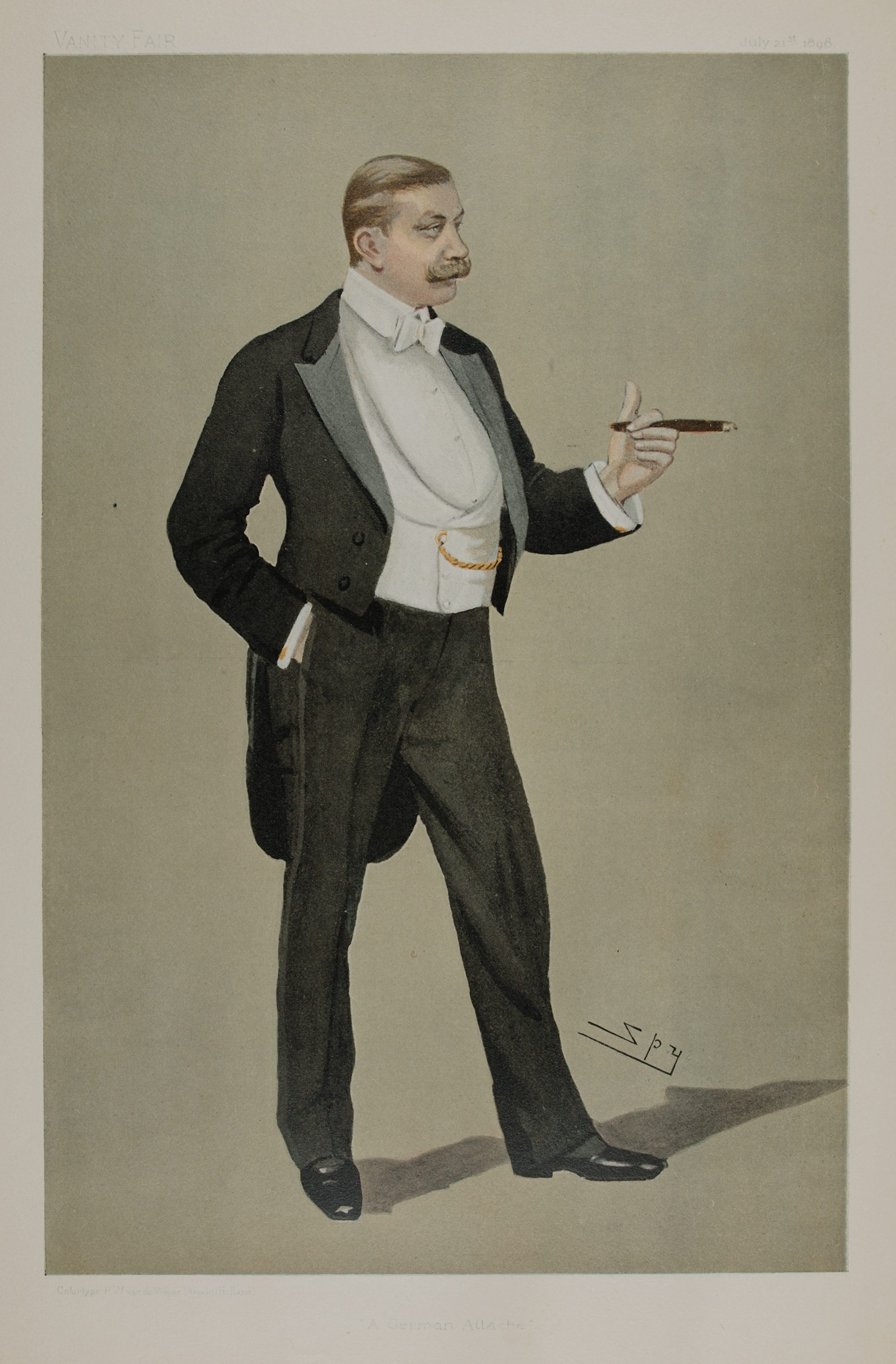
Baron Hermann von Eckardstein (1864–1933) in London."A German attaché", a caricature by Spy in Vanity Fair, 1898.

Eckardstein's social interests earned him a prominent place in Britain's leading circles. At the time of his friendship with Mrs Atherton he was married to Grace Emily Blundell Maple, the daughter of John Blundell Maple, the business magnate who owned the furniture maker Maple & Co. Eckardstein's first wife married Archibald Weigall in 1910.

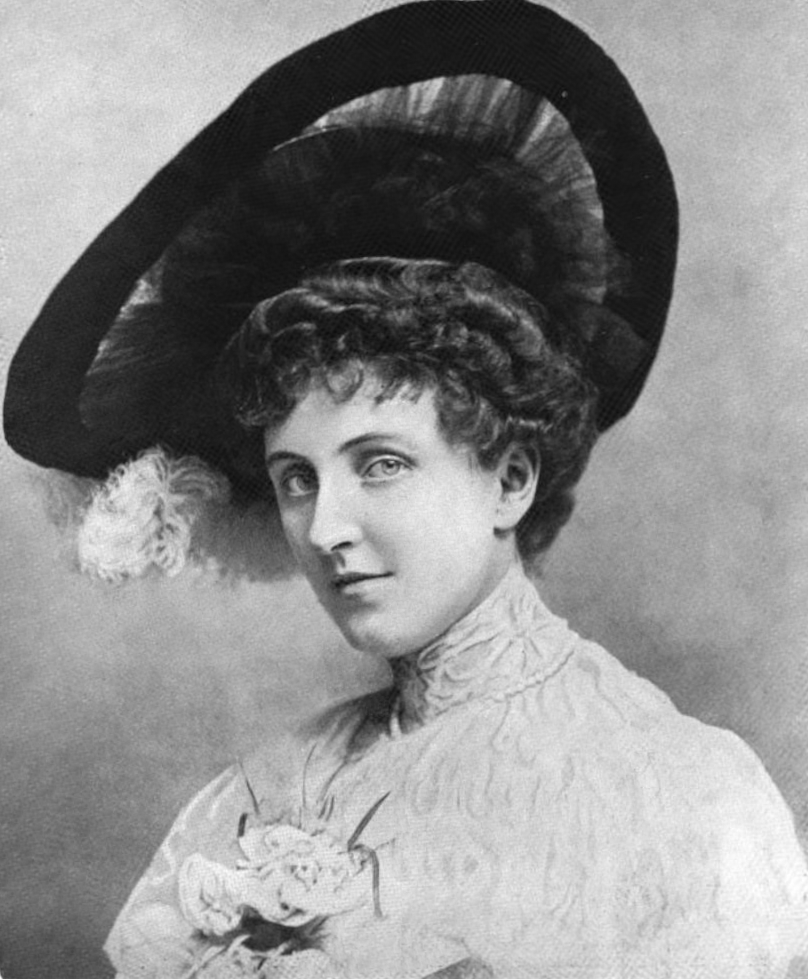
Grace Emily Blundell Maple (1876–1950)

=== The affair with the Laird of Kippendavie ===
During 1908, Captain John Alexander Stirling of the Scots Guards, and the Laird of Kippendavie and Mrs Atherton would secretly rendezvous at an apartment in the Cadogan Hotel, Pont Street, Knightsbridge. Stirling was 10 years her junior. This choice of venue had become infamous a decade earlier during the arrest of Oscar Wilde.

Mrs Atherton was one of the four principals in the Stirling Divorce Case in Edinburgh during 1909. Clara Elizabeth Taylor Stirling, an American born actress and ex-chorus girl, alleged that her noble Scottish husband had been unfaithful with Mrs Atherton. Some sources refer to Stirling as the Laird of Kippendaire.

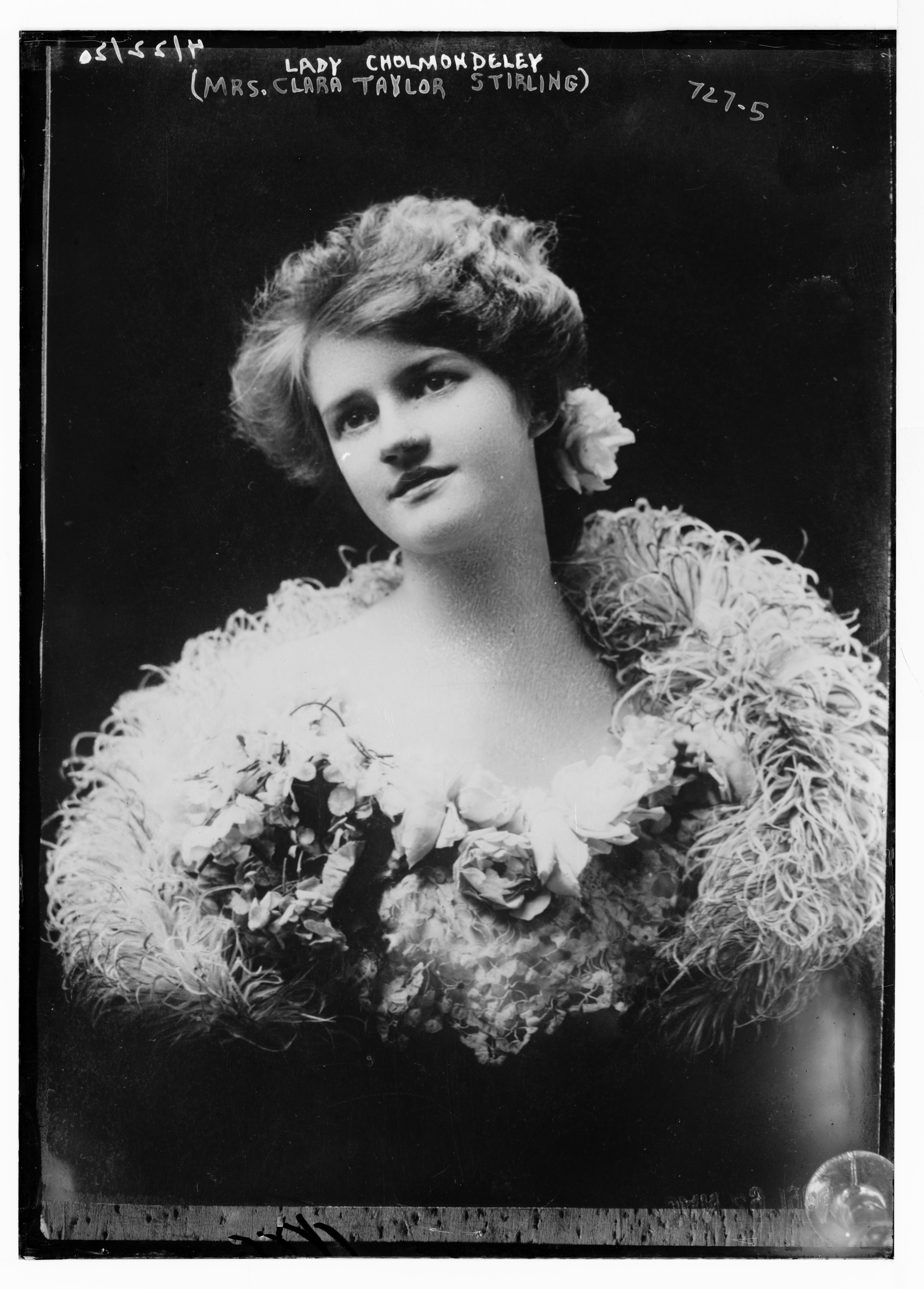
Mrs. Clara Taylor Stirling

Clara Stirling had petitioned for divorce, naming Mrs Atherton as Co-respondent. However, in John Stirling's action, an allegation was made that Clara Stirling had herself had committed adultery with the son of Uchter Knox, 5th Earl of Ranfurly, Thomas Uchter Knox, Viscount Northland (1882–1915) of the Coldstream Guards.

Stirling vs. Stirling was a lengthy court case. Mrs Atherton's Lady's maid, Thérèse Dagorne, testified as to her mistress's encounters with the dashing Mr Stirling.

Dagorne provided extensive testimony for the prosecution, and during one court session, revealed that her own lover was the Stirling's valet. Between 1908 and 1909 British newspaper readers were transfixed with the Stirling Divorce case, with Mrs Atherton's own private affairs being subject to public scrutiny.

Witnesses included Gilbert Sackville, 8th Earl De La Warr, who stated that he had known Mrs Atherton since South Africa and that his intentions towards Mrs Atherton had always been honourable. His wife was also good friends with Mrs Atherton. His attendance in court, was as a result of also being named by Mrs Atherton's treacherous Lady's Maid, who provided the court with details of her visiting De La Warr at a bungalow in Bexhill-on-Sea.

Further evidence in the court related to Mr and Mrs Stirling, Northland and Mrs Atherton having visited Paris together during June 1908.

Morals were brought into question when couples swapped company during their stay in public. Stirling had claimed that they had each stayed in adjacent rooms. However witnesses called to testify stated that the suites were interconnected, and that Stirling's bedroom had been left untouched. A monogrammed handkerchief belonging to Stirling had been found under her pillow by her Lady's maid at Mrs Atherton's riverfront home, Amberley Cottage in Maidenhead. At the Ocean Hotel, Sandown, Isle of Wight it was "Jackie, dear" and "Nancy, darling". During the court case the Daily Mirror reported that the court was presented as evidence a model of The Ocean Hotel in Sandown to better aid understanding of the proximity of each co-respondent when they were simultaneously guests at this particular Isle of Wight hotel.

After much deliberation, the court eventually ruled in favour of John A. Stirling and Mrs Atherton. The charges against Mrs Atherton were held unfounded. In delivering his judgement, Charles John Guthrie, Lord Guthrie criticised all parties stating all had led selfish and idle lives.

In relation to Atherton he said she was:

"a lady by birth and fitted to take a conspicuous place in society, but had been ostracised by her own wrong-doing."

=== Society women in a brawl ===
In February 1909, Mrs Atherton made headlines yet again. This time the headline was titled "Trouble in a Park Lane Drawing Room". Mrs Taylor senior was furious of the outcome of the Stirling Divorce Case and blamed Mrs Atherton for ruining her daughter's marriage. Mrs Atherton was physically assaulted in her London home, when the situation escalated to Mrs Taylor pulling at Mrs Atherton's hair and scratching her victims face.

Two months later, Clara Stirling lodged an appeal against Lord Guthrie's court decision, but was unsuccessful. The Stirling's divorced and Clara remarried in 1911. Her new husband was George Cholmondeley, 5th Marquess of Cholmondeley and for a short time Clara was Lady Cholmondeley.

=== Arthur Weigall and a winter in Egypt (1909 to 1910) ===
Having been paraded around the court in Edinburgh with the Stirling Divorce case, providing months of entertainment for the British public during 1909, Mrs Atherton chose to leave London and spend the next winter in Egypt, far away from the unforgiving society hostesses of London and journalists primed for the next society scandal.

Whilst in Luxor, Mrs Atherton spent time at the Winter Palace Hotel as the Edwardian era was drawing to a close. Mrs Atherton came into frequent contact with the renowned Egyptologists, Alan Gardiner, Arthur Weigall, Flinders Petrie, Gaston Maspero, Theodore Davis, Percy Newberry, Howard Carter and others, such as Ronald Storrs and socialised with Arthur Weigall, who took her to tour the monuments. Weigall, a cousin of Archibald Weigall, described Mrs Atherton in a positive light in his letters to his American born first wife, Hortense (née Schleiter), who had remained in London. Weigall's wife was furious with him and his transparency about receiving so much female attention. His close family compared Mrs Atherton in a disparaging way to the devilish heroine in Robert Hitchens 1909 hit novel, Bella Donna.

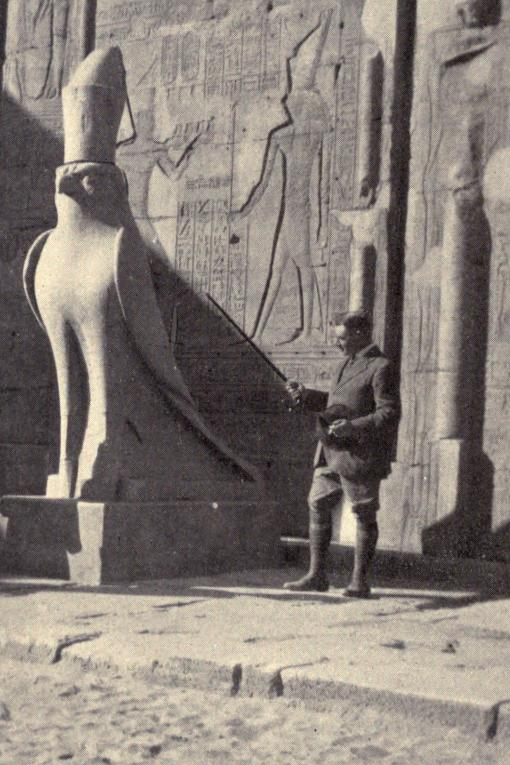
Weigall at the Temple of Edfu

Bordering on infatuation, Weigall described her as:

"the beautiful Mrs Atherton"

Weigall invited her to many functions and social dinners. Over time this became a source of social gossip, and soon this reached her circle of acquaintances in London.

=== Slander action of 1911 ===
Mrs Atherton once again ignited much interest in the press. Allegations from her sister in law, Lady Irene Dean Paul claimed that Mrs Atherton was unceremoniously ejected from the prestigious Savoy Hotel in Cairo, resulting in a raiment of disrepute cast upon her name. Atherton presented herself as a victim of circumstance and social jealousy.

Mrs Atherton, in an attempt to clear her good name, brought a slander action against her sibling, Sir Aubrey Dean Paul and his wife Lady Irene, who was professionally known as the renowned composer, Poldowski.

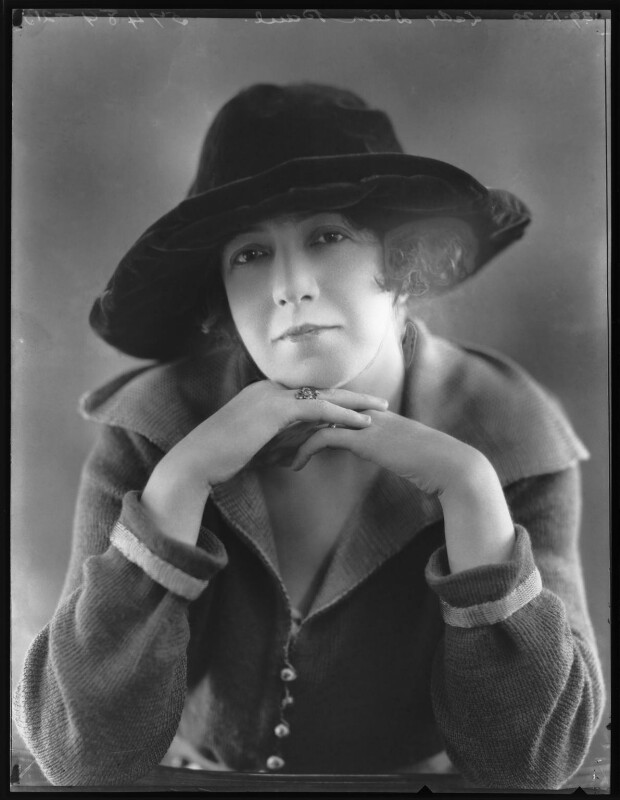
Poldowski (Régine (née Wieniawski), Lady Dean Paul)

In court, Mrs Atherton alleged that Lady Irene Dean Paul had related of her that she had been turned out of the Savoy Hotel in Cairo, and that she was a disreputable woman. These remarks were made to Richard Stacpoole, who was married to her sister Edith. Atherton went to the Dean Paul residence and was directly accused by Lady Irene of being a disreputable woman. The jury awarded Mrs Atherton one farthing. Colonel Atherton, by now frustrated with his ex-wife's profile in the newspapers asked her to remarry him just for the sake of the children, but she refused.

=== First World War ===
During the First World War she managed to lower her public profile, since the press did not covet her as they had done previously for more than a decade. Mrs Atherton did feature in Tatler on 25 August 1915 whilst staying at The Wentworth Hotel in Aldeburgh in Suffolk. She was photographed whilst sat on the steps in a bathing suit and also in the water.

=== Grey Sand ===
Her novel “Grey Sand”, was published in 1915 by Everett & Company. It was story about a mock marriage and the disastrous effect on the political career of the hero. She wrote under the name of Maimie Atherton and was working on her second novel at the time of her untimely death.

=== The accident in Regent Street ===
At the end of 1917, Mrs Atherton was knocked down by a motor car on Regent Street and was subsequently awarded £300 damages for having suffered eye injuries, fractures to her collarbone fracture and her shoulder blade.

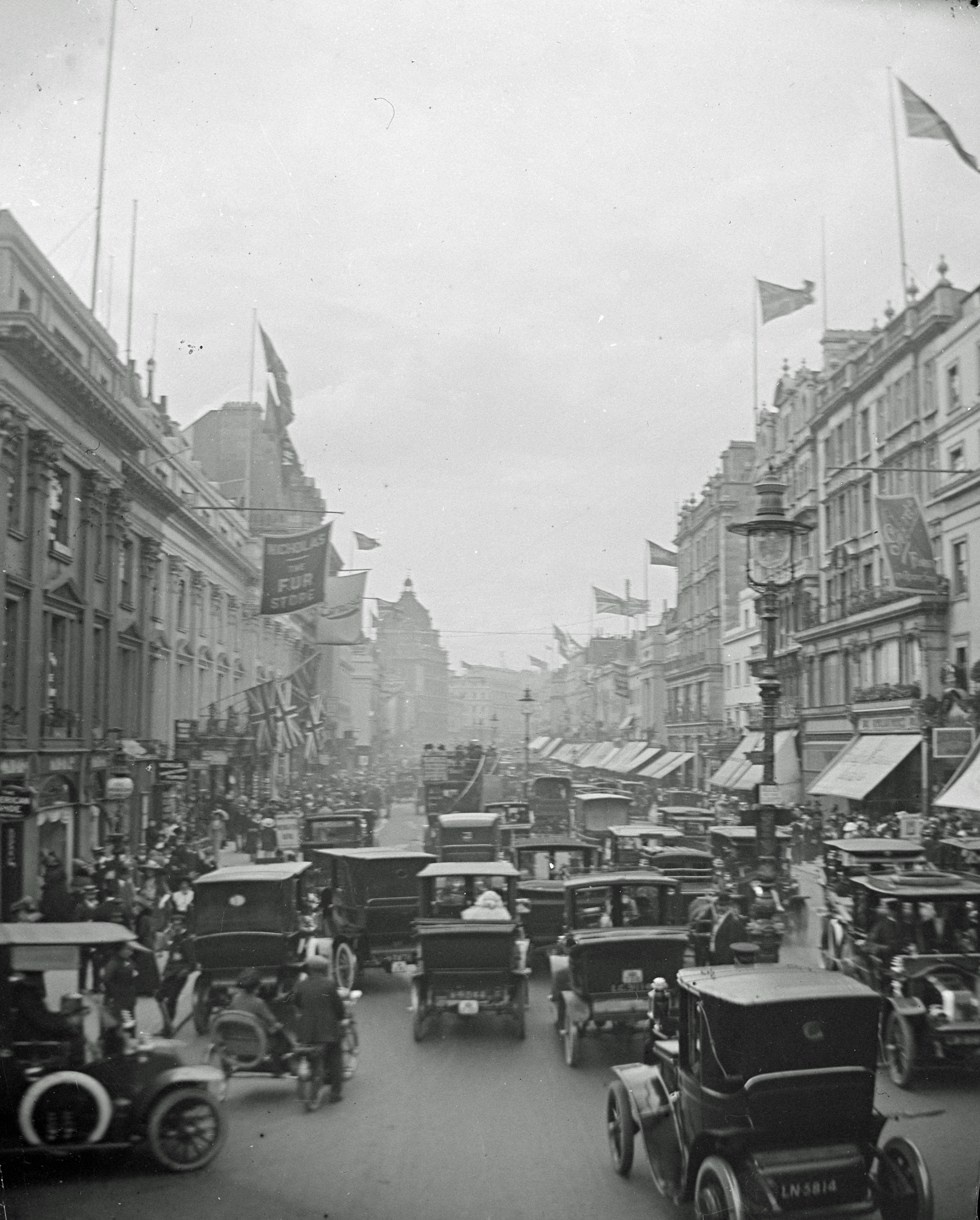
Regent Street, London. Credit: Peter Elfelt

=== The short lived second marriage ===
In the last two and a half months of her life, Atherton, a wealthy divorcee, a woman of independent means, and weary of publicity, finally remarried on 26 April 1919.

Her choice of second husband was the Honourable Arthur Ernest Henry Eliot (1874–1936). "Ernie" was a playwright, with a passion for Edwardian musical comedy, and cousin to Ivor Guest, 1st Viscount Wimborne and Edward Ponsonby, 8th Earl of Bessborough. He was educated at Charterhouse School, as her first husband, and had served in the Boer War as a Lieutenant. Eliot lacked financial acumen and was declared bankrupt three times. He had also been married twice before Atherton accepted his hand in marriage.

Their honeymoon took place in the Mediterranean. However, the relationship between the newlyweds was already turning sour. Upon their return to London, Mrs Atherton, as she continued to be known, had encountered Eliot in bed with Miss Nellie Cornell, his 24 year old stepdaughter from his second marriage. Shortly after, she accused him of further infidelity, when she discovered that he was providing long-term economic support to a dancer from The popular Murray's Cabaret Club, on Beak Street in Soho.

== Death ==
Following some mediation with her second husband's brother in an attempt repair the marital damage, she was unsuccessful in persuading Eliot to return to her.

Her last day started with routine. On 9 July 1919, Mrs Atherton awoke and ate her breakfast. She left the home alone and during the day visited the Royal Academy. Upon returning to 47 Curzon Street, Mayfair later in the afternoon, she commented to her maid about the works of art that she enjoyed. The maid did not notice anything untoward in terms of her composure that day. However, later that evening, Mrs Atherton, ended her life. She wrote two letters; one to a close friend and one to her husband. She then locked her bedroom door and barricaded some furniture against the door, before returning to sit on a chair where she shot herself dead in the head with a sporting gun. The maid immediately heard the gun shot, however could not open the bedroom door. The maid called a Dr Fuber and the door was forced open. The maid then entered her bedroom, only to find Mrs Atherton slumped in a chair having suffered a mortal head wound. The New York Times reported the event in detail the next day describing it as an “apparent” suicide. One paper claimed she had been found shot dead which inferred the involvement of a third party. However the inquest on the Friday the same week said otherwise.

Mrs Atherton was once again in the public eye, albeit for the wrong reasons. Upon her tragic death, the Daily Herald commented that:

"In her life as well as in its tragic end, Mrs Atherton, as far as one can judge, seems to have been a follower of Nietzsche's famous adage - Live dangerously!"

Mrs Atherton was buried at Kensal Green Cemetery as Mabel Eliot. She left no will. Letters of administration were granted to her sister, Edith Stacpoole of 10 West Chapel Street, Mayfair. At the inquest, Eliot stated that Mrs Atherton received £4,000 to £5,000 a year. A few months later the press reported that her estate was only valued at £8,206.

== Inquest ==
The official inquest into her death was reported in newspapers globally. Eliot's stepdaughter, Miss Nellie Cornell, took to the stand, and denied that there had ever been any impropriety with her stepfather, Eliot.

Eliot's defending position on his good character was that his new wife had been sending him anonymous threatening letters, which had forced him to leave his home. The verdict reached was suicide, while of an unsound mind. Despite this verdict, Bruce Bairnsfather, the prominent British humorist and cartoonist who had been actively collaborating with Eliot at the time, promptly dissociated himself from this scandal in order to prevent it from damaging his reputation.

== Aftermath ==
There was much speculation in newspapers globally as to her reasons to end her life; whether it was Eliot's lack of commitment to marriage and alleged repeated infidelity, or a decline in her financial standing which she had allegedly maintained hidden from Eliot, or her inability to cope with aging.

Newspaper articles highlighted to readers the timing of the tragic event with that of the 2nd Duke of Westminster's divorce, who by now had found a new duchess. Mrs Atherton was aged 47 at her time of her tragic death, and the Duke's latest interest was Violet Nelson, 19 years her junior.

Public fascination into the reasons for her suicide continued into the 1920s, with American newspapers evoking comparisons to other high-profile suicides during this time period, such as Alma Vetsera Hayne, Hallye Whatley Peck and Florence Schenke. Further associations have been made to the gradual loss of status in society, with comparisons made to Clara Ward, Princesse de Caraman-Chimay. Hallye Whatley Peck, an American socialite living in London, in turn has been the subject of an alleged curse which coincided with the untimely deaths of Gaby Deslys, Billie Carleton and 3 other actresses. All 6 actresses had starred together in an Austen Hurgon musical production called "Suzette" in London in 1917. Coincidentally, Mrs Atherton's second husband was involved with this particular Edwardian musical comedy.

== Family connections ==
Mabel Atherton (née Dean Paul) was a descendant of the 1st Duke of Marlborough Her paternal ancestor was Sir John Dean Paul, 1st Baronet (1775–1852).

Her father was Sir Edward John Dean Paul, 4th baronet (1831–1895), an art collector. Her brother was Sir Aubrey Dean Paul, the father of Brenda Dean Paul, the silent film actress, socialite, and "Bright Young Thing" in the 1920s.

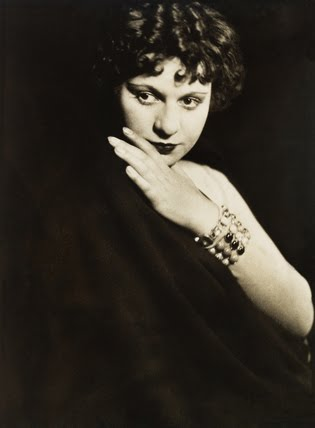
Brenda Dean Paul in 1930

Her elder sister Edith Dean Paul married Richard George Stacpoole (1860–1941), grandson to Richard Fitzgeorge de Stacpoole, 1st Duke de Stacpoole. Her younger sister Gladys Lisa died in Matjiesfontein, Cape Colony, South Africa in 1902.

== Marriages and issue ==
At the age of 20, she married Thomas James Atherton, the son of the late Sir William Atherton and Lady Agnes Atherton, on 30 July 1892 at St Paul's Church, Knightsbridge. Her new husband was 16 years her senior. From that date, she only titled herself as Mrs Atherton.

Her husband, then Captain Thomas J. Atherton had been orphaned as an infant and was educated at Charterhouse School and at Cambridge. He entered the 12th Royal Lancers in 1880 as a serving officer. His brother, Major Walter Hyde Atherton, had recently died a hero in the Battle of Abu Klea on 17 January 1885.

They had two sons. The first son, Walter Wentworth Atherton was born on 4 June 1893. This son was killed in a carriage accident when the horse bolted when frightened by a bear in 1898. At the time the Atherton family residence was 82 Sloane Street, Kensington. An inquest into his death was held at Marylebone. Walter, aged 4, had been traveling with his nurse, Kate Thompson in his father's four-wheeled brougham carriage. A bear was being led along the road at the time. The horse bolted, the brougham collided with a waggon, and the nurse was thrown into the road. Walter suffered a skull fracture and was taken to Middlesex Hospital where he was pronounced dead. After the evidence, an opinion was given that it should not be allowed that bears to be led in public thoroughfares. Walter's uncle Captain William Cossley Atherton (late Lt RN) of the Fife Artillery stated that he knew of a similar incident. Horses could smell bears, and took fright. The jury returned a verdict of accidental death. A second son, Aubrey James Atherton was born on 5 April 1899.

In 1900, her then husband, succeeded to the command of his regiment in South Africa, during the Boer War, after the death in action of Lieutenant-Colonel David Ogilvy, 11th Earl of Airlie. Prior to this, Major Atherton's and his regiment had been heavily engaged at the Battle of Magersfontein, the Siege of Kimberley and the Battle of Diamond Hill. After being promoted Lieutenant-Colonel, and taking command of his regiment, he led his troops in the sweeps in the vicinity of Rustenburg, Magaliesberg and the Elands River, followed by Wittebergen. At the end of 1900, he handed over command, and from July to November 1901 he was given command of a cavalry column, consisting of 480 12th Lancers. It was during this commanding role that he filed for divorce and his wife returned to England via Madeira. He was mentioned in Lord Roberts’ despatch of 29 November 1900, and the London Gazette of 10 September 1901. On 27 September 1901, Thomas Atherton received his Companion of the Bath (CB).

In 1904, whilst staying away from London in the countryside with her 4-year-old son, she had the misfortune of being seriously injured in a house fire.

By 1906, she was a divorcee. She did not revert to her maiden name and continued to use her married name although she had no right to do so.

During March 1919 her son, Aubrey, in the footsteps of his father, joined the 12th Lancers as a 2nd Lt. Her son's father Colonel Atherton would die a year later.

On 26 April 1919, she married Hon. Arthur E. H. Eliot, the son of Colonel Hon. Charles G. Cornwallis Eliot (1839–1901), a courtier and army officer; the son of Edward Eliot, 3rd Earl of St Germans. His mother was Constance Rhiannon Guest (1844 -1916), the daughter of Lady Charlotte Guest. A veteran of the Boer War, he struggled when returning to civilian life, and suffered a series of catastrophic life failures. In the census of 1911 he claimed that he was employed as a journalist by the editor of Vanity Fair. By 1913 he was working as one of Charles B. Cochran managers at the Olympia Circus. With the outbreak of hostilities in France in 1914 he served with the Indian Division. After the war, Eliot achieved some credibility with a handful of successful theatrical projects and was part author of The Better 'Ole. The original London production in 1917 was a hit, running for over 800 performances at Oxford Music Hall.

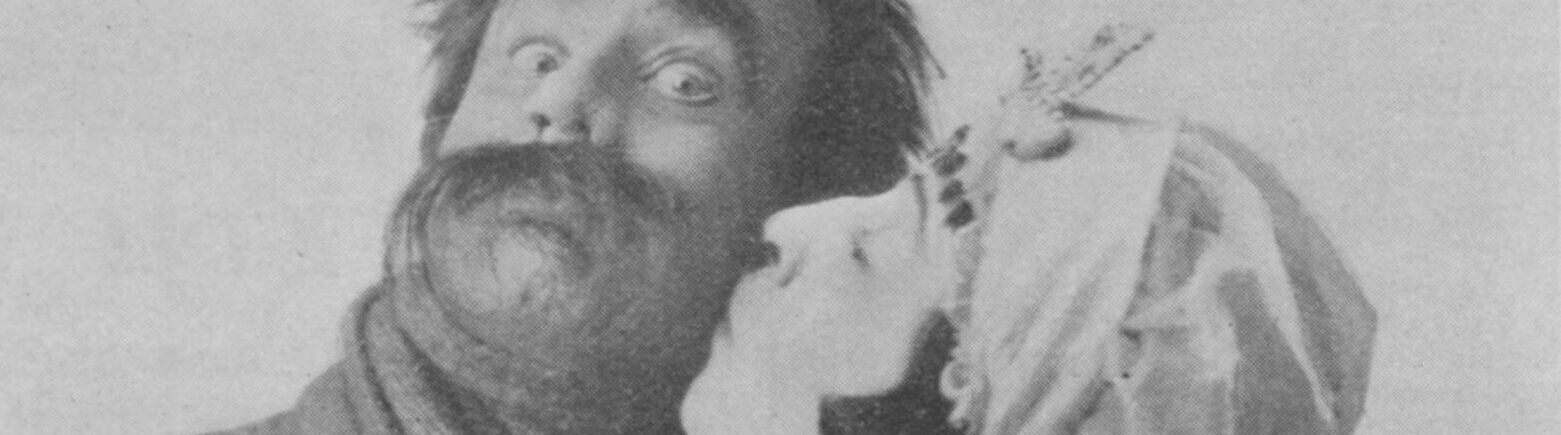
'Old Bill' and 'Victoire' in The Better 'Ole

By 1918 this co-authored play received acclaim at the Greenwich Village Theatre and destined for the Broadway theatre.

Eliot remarried in 1933, fourteen years after her death. His fourth wife was the Argentine born racecourse owner, Eleanor Whyte Hughes Brownlee (1885–1976). Eliot died in a north London nursing home in 1936.

Her son Aubrey, after serving in the Army became a farmer in Kenya. In 1922 he was based in Ruiru in the Kenya's Central Province. By 1928 he was running the Thego River Estate, near Naro Moru. Aubrey returned to England prior to World War II. He retired to Conwy, Wales where he died on 18 June 1977.
