= Sir George Paul, 2nd Baronet =

English prison reformer and philanthropist

Sir George Onesiphorus Paul, 2nd Baronet (1746–1820) was an English prison reformer and philanthropist.

== Life ==
Born at Woodchester, Gloucestershire, he was the son of Sir Onesiphorus Paul, textile manufacturer, by his first wife, Jane, daughter of Francis Blackburne of St. Nicholas, Yorkshire. He matriculated at St. John's College, Oxford, on 8 December 1763, graduating M.A. 12 December 1766. He took the additional Christian name of George in February 1780. He spent several years travelling on the continent of Europe, living in 1767–8 at the courts of Brunswick and Vienna, and then visiting Hungary, Poland, and Italy, and returning through France. In 1780, the year of his return, he was High Sheriff of Gloucestershire.

The state of Gloucestershire's county gaol and houses of correction began to attract Paul's attention. At the spring assizes held at Gloucester in 1783, as foreman of the grand jury, he addressed the jurors on the subject of the prevalence of gaol fever, and suggested means of treating it, and of preventing it in the future. At a meeting summoned by the High Sheriff on 6 October, at the grand jury's request, he carried a motion that "a new gaol and certain new houses of correction" should be built; and a committee, with Paul as chairman, was appointed to carry out the work.

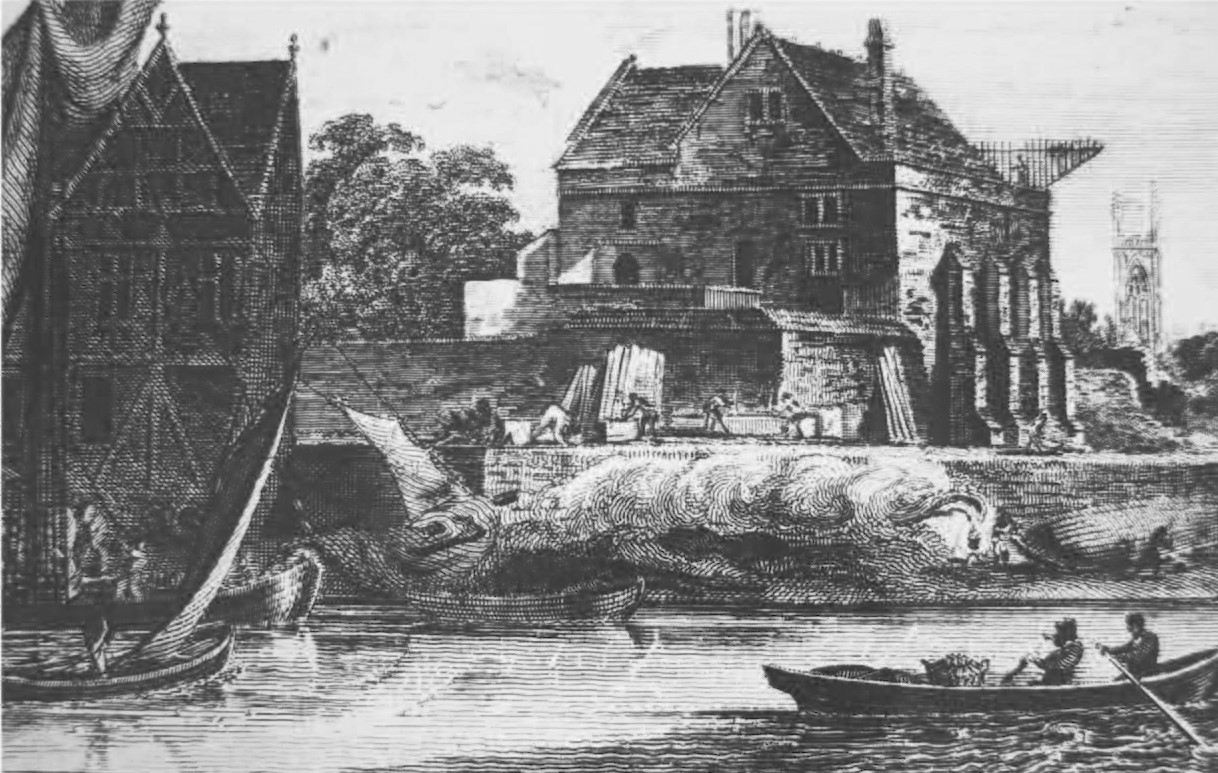
Gloucester Castle and Gaol in the 18th century. (A later work said to be based on an 1819 original)

Paul obtained a special Act of Parliament, and himself designed a county gaol at Gloucester, with a penitentiary annexed. The building was opened in 1791. It had a chapel, a dispensary, two infirmaries, and a foul-ward (for venereal disease) in the upper storey; workrooms were provided for debtors, and those who were unable to obtain work from outside were given it on application to a manufacturer, and were allowed to retain two-thirds of what they earned. At the same time five new bridewells were erected in various parts of Gloucester.

Another interest was in the Stroud society for providing free medical advice and medicine, of which Paul became president in 1783. He was active in putting down "slingeing", i.e. the embezzlement of, and fraudulent dealing in, cloth material. On 14 August 1788 George III, Queen Charlotte, and their three eldest daughters, when on their way to Cheltenham, breakfasted at Hill House with Paul, and visited Obadiah Paul's cloth manufactory at Woodchester Mill.

Paul was one of the party who accompanied Sir Walter Scott to the Hebrides in 1810. He died on 16 December 1820. On his death the baronetcy expired, but was revived on 3 September 1821 by a new creation in favour of his cousin John Dean Paul, the father of Sir John Dean Paul, the banker and fraudster.

== Works ==
Paul wrote:

- Thoughts on the Alarming Progress of the Gaol Fever, 1784.
- Considerations on the Defects of Prisons, 1784, and 2nd edit. with a postscript.
- Address to the Magistrates of Gloucestershire at the Michaelmas Quarter Sessions, 1789, considered the appointment of officers and the adoption of regulations for the government of the new prisons. Paul in the preface wrote he that the proposed regulations had been "hastily drawn up" for John Howard.
- Proceedings in the Construction and Regulation of the Prisons and Houses of Correction of the County of Gloucester, 1810.

== Notes ==
Attribution

This article incorporates text from a publication now in the public domain: Lee, Sidney, ed. (1895). "Paul, George Onesiphorus". Dictionary of National Biography. Vol. 44. London: Smith, Elder & Co.

Baronetage of Great Britain
Preceded by Onespihorus Paul	Baronet (of Rodborough); 1774–1820	Extinct
