= Paul baronets of Rodborough (second creation, 1821) =

Escutcheon of the Paul Baronets of Rodborough (second creation)

The Paul baronetcy, of Rodborough in the County of Gloucester, was created in the Baronetage of the United Kingdom on 3 September 1821 for the banker John Dean Paul. Sir Onesiophorus Paul, 1st Baronet of the first creation, was his great-uncle, a younger brother of his grandfather Dean Paul.

The 2nd Baronet was a partner in the failed banking firm Strahan, Paul & Bates, and was convicted of fraud. The title became extinct on the death of the 6th Baronet in 1972.

== Paul baronets, of Rodborough (1821) ==
- Sir John Dean Paul, 1st Baronet (1775–1852)
- Sir John Dean Paul, 2nd Baronet (1802–1868)
- Sir Aubrey John Dean Paul, 3rd Baronet (1829–1890)
- Sir Edward John Dean Paul, 4th Baronet (1831–1895)
- Sir Aubrey Edward Henry Dean Paul, 5th Baronet (1869–1961)
- Sir Brian Kenneth Dean Paul, 6th Baronet (1904–1972)

== Notes ==
Baronetage of the United Kingdom
Preceded by Cooper baronets	Paul baronets of Rodborough (second creation); 3 September 1821	Succeeded by Trotter baronets
