= Astley-Cooper baronets =

English baronetcy

Escutcheon of the Astley-Cooper baronets of Gadebridge

The Cooper, later Paston-Cooper, later Astley-Cooper Baronetcy, of Gadebridge in the County of Hertford, is a title in the Baronetage of the United Kingdom. It was created on 31 August 1821 for the noted surgeon and anatomist Astley Cooper, with remainder, in default of male issue, to his nephew Astley Paston Cooper, third son of his elder brother Reverend Samuel Lovick Cooper, who succeeded as second Baronet in 1841. The third and fourth Baronets used the surname of Paston-Cooper. The sixth Baronet used the surname of Astley-Cooper, which is also used by the seventh Baronet and (as of 2026) present holder of the title.

== Astley-Cooper baronets, of Gadebridge (1821) ==
- Sir Astley Paston Cooper, 1st Baronet (1768–1841)
- Sir Astley Paston Cooper, 2nd Baronet (1798–1866)
- Sir Astley Paston Paston-Cooper, 3rd Baronet (1824–1904)
- Sir Charles Naunton Paston Paston-Cooper, 4th Baronet (1867–1941)
- Sir Henry Lovick Cooper, 5th Baronet (1875–1959)
- Sir Patrick Graham Astley-Cooper, 6th Baronet (1918–2002)
- Sir Alexander Paston Astley-Cooper, 7th Baronet (born 1943)

The heir presumptive is the present holder's cousin Desmond Beauchamp Cooper (born 1955). His heir apparent is his eldest son Kimball Cooper (born 1986).

== See also ==
- Astley baronets
- Cooper baronets

Baronetage of the United Kingdom
Preceded by Smith baronets	Cooper baronets of Gadebridge; 31 August 1821	Succeeded by Paul baronets
