= Aubrey Dean Paul =

British Army officer (1869–1961)

Sir Aubrey Edward Henry Dean Paul, 5th Baronet (19 October 1869 – 16 January 1961) was a captain in the Northumberland Fusiliers and a descendant of the 1st Duke of Marlborough.

== Life ==
A descendant of Sir John Dean Paul, 1st Baronet (1775–1852), he was fifth of the Paul Baronets, of Rodborough, and father of Brenda Dean Paul, one of the ‘bright young things’. He was brother to Mabel Louisa Dean Paul.

In 1901, he married Irene Regina, daughter of Henryk Wieniawski and Isabelle Bessie-Hampton. The couple had been introduced by Nellie Melba. Lady Dean Paul, now adopted British nationality, but continued to publish works as "Irène Wieniawska". They had three children:

- Aubrey Donald Fitzwarren Severin Dean Paul (1902–1904)
- Brenda Dean Paul (8 May 1907 – 26 July 1959)
- Sir Brian Kenneth Dean Paul, 6th Baronet Paul of Rodborough (18 May 1904 – 5 August 1972)

Sir Aubrey and his wife performed in a number of concerts together, Aubrey performing as a baritone under the pseudonym of Edward Ramsay, a combination of his father's first name and his mother's surname. His wife, a pianist, performed under her own pseudonym of Poldowski.

== Religion ==
The 5th Baronet converted to Roman Catholicism in 1914 and the couple's daughter was educated at convent schools. His wife maintained a Bohemian lifestyle and the couple separated in 1922.

Baronetage of the United Kingdom
Preceded by Edward Dean Paul	Baronet (of Rodborough); 1895–1961	Succeeded by Brian Dean Paul
