= Brian Dean Paul =

British poet (1904–1972)

Sir Brian Kenneth "Napper" Dean Paul, 6th Baronet Paul of Rodborough (1904–1972), was a member of the "Bright Young Things" social scene, together with his sister Brenda Dean Paul.

== Biography ==
Brian Kenneth Dean Paul, known as "Napier" or "Napper", was born in 1904, the son of Sir Aubrey Edward Henry Dean Paul, 5th Baronet, and Irene Regina "Poldowski" Wieniawski. He got his nickname from his habit of falling asleep in doorways due to a serious drug addiction; like his younger sister, the socialite and sometime actress Brenda Dean Paul, he was an alcoholic and opiate user.

In 1930 Napper Dean Paul took over the grill-room of a restaurant in Burlington Gardens, which he named "The Breakfast-Room". He specialized in a supper-breakfast menu of Anglo-American dishes, with dancing and a cabaret.

Dean Paul also published a volume of poems, called Patchwork.

In 1931 he was involved in a scandal that was to lead his sister to prison. Scotland Yard described Napper Dean Paul as a "young man of effeminate habits and manners, who does not appear to follow any occupation". In the late 1930s he was friends with Dylan Thomas. Together with his sister Brenda, he frequented the Gargoyle Club, owned by David Tennant, Brenda's lover and brother of Stephen Tennant. He was also a friend of Anna Wickham, whom he knew from frequenting the Kleifeldts' tavern.

Dean Paul was gay, and Ken Leech recalled meeting him at the Golden Lion, a well-known gay pub in Soho. Nevertheless, in 1937, he married the pianist Muriel Lillie, widow of Arthur Weigall and sister of Beatrice Lillie.

He was also a cross-dresser, and supported himself with petty crimes, even if in the early 1930s he tried a career as interior designer. In 1941 he went to work for Kensington ARP, thanks to the recommendation of Hugh Cholmondeley, 6th Marquess of Cholmondeley, a friend and head of the association.

In the 1950s he was friends with the painter Lucian Freud, who took his portrait in 1954.

Following his father's death in 1961, Dean Paul inherited the family title and was listed in police records as Sir Brian Kenneth Dean Paul.

He died in 1972, and the Paul baronetcy became extinct.

Baronetage of the United Kingdom
| Preceded by Aubrey Dean Paul | Baronet (of Rodborough); 1961–1972 | Extinct |
