= Scott baronets of Lytchet Minster (1821) =

Escutcheon of the Scott baronets of Lytchet Minster

The Scott baronetcy, of Lytchet Minster in the County of Dorset, was created in the Baronetage of the United Kingdom on 8 September 1821 for Claude Scott. The title became extinct on the death of the seventh Baronet in 1961.

== Scott baronets, of Lytchet Minster (1821) ==
- Sir Claude Scott, 1st Baronet (1742–1830)
- Sir Samuel Scott, 2nd Baronet (1772–1849). Member of Parliament for Malmesbury 1802–1806, and Camelford 1812–1818.
- Sir Claude Edward Scott, 3rd Baronet (1804–1874)
- Sir Claude Edward Scott, 4th Baronet (1840–1880)
- Sir Edward Henry Scott, 5th Baronet (1842–1883)
- Sir Samuel Edward Scott, 6th Baronet (1873–1943)
- Sir Robert Claude Scott, 7th Baronet (1886–1961)

== Notes ==
Baronetage of the United Kingdom
Preceded by Lindsay baronets	Scott baronets of Lytchet Minster; 8 September 1821	Succeeded by Chichester baronets
