= Brenda Dean Paul =

British actress and socialite (1907–1959)

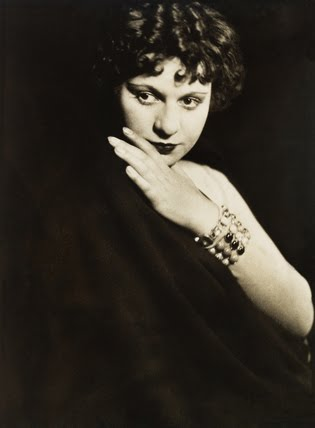
- Born: Brenda Irene Isabelle Frances Theresa Dean Paul; 8 May 1907; Kensington, London
- Died: 26 July 1959 (aged 52); London, England, UK
- Occupations: Actress, socialite
- Years active: 1925–1938

Brenda Irene Isabelle Frances Theresa Dean Paul (8 May 1907 – 26 July 1959), generally known by her stage name Brenda Dean Paul, was a British silent film actress, socialite, and "Bright Young Thing" in the 1920s. Her use of illegal drugs landed her in court and in the tabloid press of the day. She served time in Holloway Prison and had many stints in hospitals in efforts to shake her addiction.

== Early life ==
Dean Paul was the daughter of Sir Aubrey Edward Henry Dean Paul, 5th Bt, and the Belgian-born pianist and composer known as Poldowski, the daughter of the Polish violin virtuoso Henryk Wieniawski. Her elder brothers were Aubrey Donald Fitzwarren Severin Dean Paul (1902–1904) and Sir Brian Kenneth Dean Paul, 6th Baronet (18 May 1904 – 5 August 1972).

Raised Catholic and educated in convent schools, she went on to play minor roles in touring theatre companies and ventured to Berlin to build her film career, but she was quickly drawn into Berlin's hectic nightlife and failed her screen test in 1927.

== Bright Young Thing ==
On her return to England, she became a fixture of London's bohemian youth culture, "the Bright Young Things", and socialised with such celebrities as Evelyn Waugh and Cecil Beaton at the group's fancy dress parties.

Following a reported miscarriage, she became chemically dependent on morphine, which led to her lifelong battle with drug addiction and made her one of the most talked-about young women in London.

== Later years ==
In February 1931, Brenda Dean Paul made her first court appearance, having been charged with bouncing a cheque. The following decades saw her in and out of various courts, receiving sentences of up to six months in prison for possession of dangerous drugs, obtaining goods on false pretences, and theft of services (refusing to pay taxi drivers). With each court appearance her name appeared in the papers, which added to her notoriety.

In 1932, she was sent to Holloway Prison, where she developed bulimia, dropping to five stone (70 lb (32 kg)). Over the next few years she was in and out of nursing and care homes.

In 1935, she quit drugs and her ghost-written memoir, My First Life, was published. Her acting ambitions never came to anything and she again fell victim to drug addiction. In 1939 she was evicted from her flat because she "walked about naked" and "answered the door in the nude", and in 1940 she was tried for buying goods on other people's accounts.

In the mid-1950s, the young artist Michael Wishart, sitting in a restaurant, watched her take a syringe of heroin from her handbag and fill it "from a vase of flowers on the table". In 1951, she assured a reporter that she was cured and was preparing to open her own addiction clinic, but this was untrue.

In 1952, a former flatmate wrote to the police to tell them that she "augmented her income by allowing sadists to whip her". Worn down by addiction but still beautiful, she finally realized her ambition to act when she got the leading role in Ronald Firbank's play The Princess Zoubaroff at Dhurjati Chaudhury's Irving Theatre Club, on Irving Street, off Leicester Square, London. Neville Phillips reported “the role of the Princess was played by the always newsworthy, once ravishing now ravaged, oft arrested society blonde lesbian drug addict, Brenda Dean Paul, who, owing to her addiction, was not able to do all the performances, giving the ones she could manage the extra frisson of wondering if the police might burst in at any moment and make an on-stage arrest.”

== Last years and death ==
In 1957, she was admitted to a psychiatric hospital in Rome with a parcel of cocaine in her possession. She died in London on 26 July 1959, aged 52.
