= Violin Concerto No. 1 (Wieniawski) =

Concerto by Henryk Wieniawski

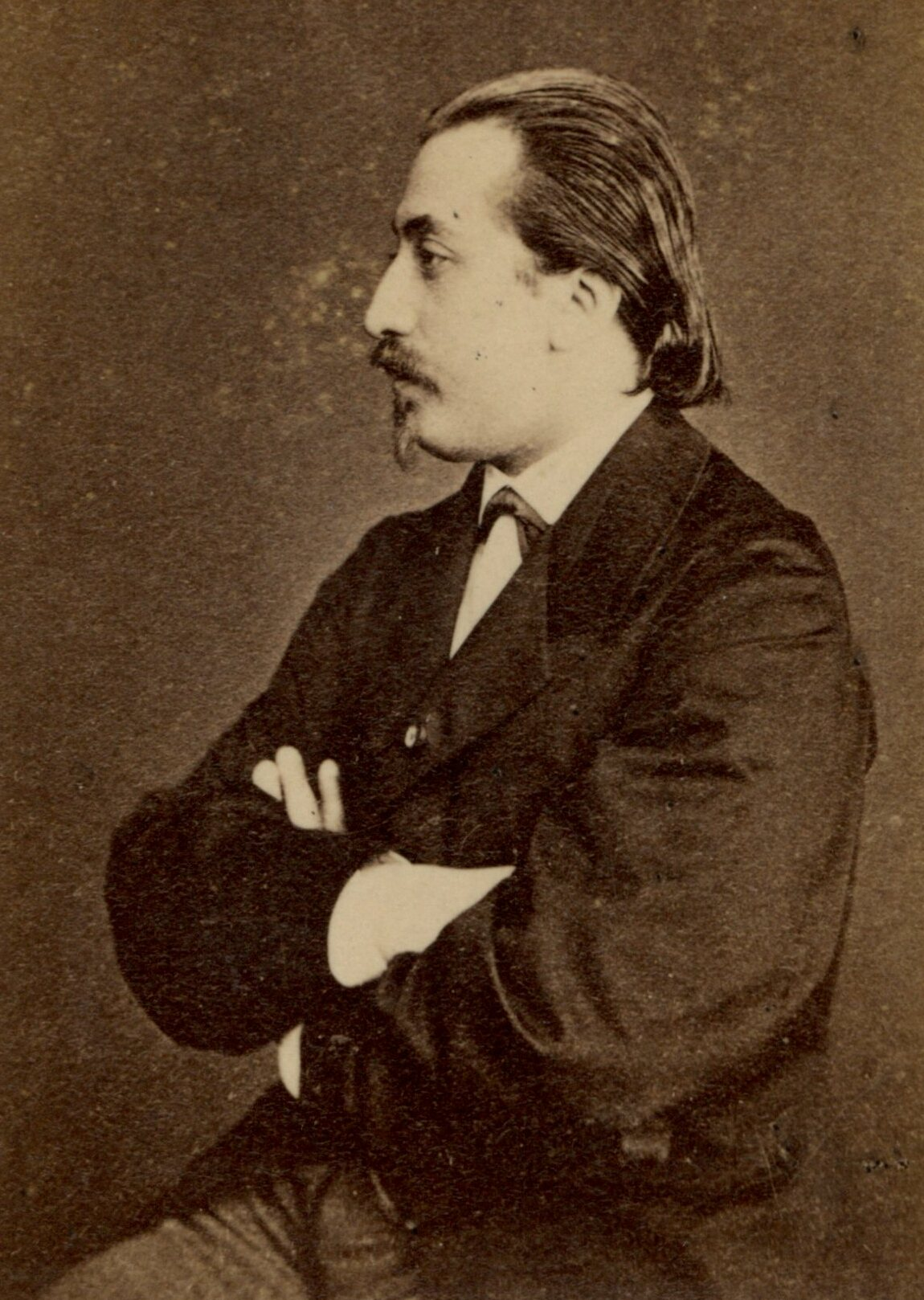
Henryk Wieniawski

Violin Concerto No. 1 in F♯ minor, Op. 14, by Polish violin virtuoso Henryk Wieniawski was first performed on October 27, 1853, in Leipzig. The score is dedicated to King Friedrich Wilhelm IV of Prussia.

== Structure ==
The work is in three movements:

1. Allegro moderato
2. Preghiera: Larghetto
3. Rondo: Allegro giocoso

A typical performance takes around 28 - 30 minutes.

=== Analysis ===
The first movement has two contrasting themes, the first in dotted rhythm and initially hesitant and the second in B major (begun by the cellos), wide-ranging and expressive. These are, in turn, dissected and ornamented by the soloist with formidable virtuosity, using multiple-stopping and harmonics and, notably in the cadenza, the extreme upper register of the violin.

The second movement, Preghiera (Prayer), is a short lyrical interlude in A major, with the orchestra woodwinds and horns given much prominence. It leads into the concluding Rondo, a colourful and vivacious piece with a contrasting episode in B major and demanding bravura playing, but without the first movement's extreme pyrotechnics (suggesting that it was composed earlier).
