= Scherzo Tarantelle =

Scherzo by Henryk Wieniawski

Scherzo Tarantelle Op. 16 is a virtuosic piece for violin with piano accompaniment composed by Henryk Wieniawski, written in 1855. It was likely inspired by Frédéric Chopin's Tarantelle, or possibly Karol Lipiński's transcription of it. Wieniawski dedicated it to his teacher, Lambert Massart.

The piece is a rondo with the form ABACA and a coda, with the B section being a maggiore in G major and the C section being a cantabile in D major. A version with orchestral accompaniment also exists, which features an extra 20 measures of introduction before the violin entrance.
