= Lindsay baronets of West Ville (1821) =

Lindsay-Trotter arms

The Trotter, later Lindsay baronetcy, of West Ville in the County of Lincoln, was created in the Baronetage of the United Kingdom on 4 September 1821 for Coutts Trotter, principal partner in Coutt's Bank, with remainder to the male issue of his daughter Anne. She was the wife of Lieutenant-General Sir James Lindsay, son of the Hon. Robert Lindsay, second son of James Lindsay, 5th Earl of Balcarres.

Their eldest son, Coutts, the artist, succeeded to the title; he had no son and the title became extinct on his death in 1913. Robert Loyd-Lindsay, 1st Baron Wantage, was his younger brother.

== Lindsay baronets, of West Ville (1821) ==
- Sir Coutts Trotter, 1st Baronet (1767–1837)
- Sir Coutts Lindsay, 2nd Baronet (1824–1913)

== Notes ==
Baronetage of the United Kingdom
Preceded by Paul baronets	Lindsay baronets of West Ville; 4 September 1821	Succeeded by Scott baronets
