= Poldowski =

Belgian-born British composer and pianist (1879 - 1932)

Poldowski (Régine (née Wieniawski), Lady Dean Paul)
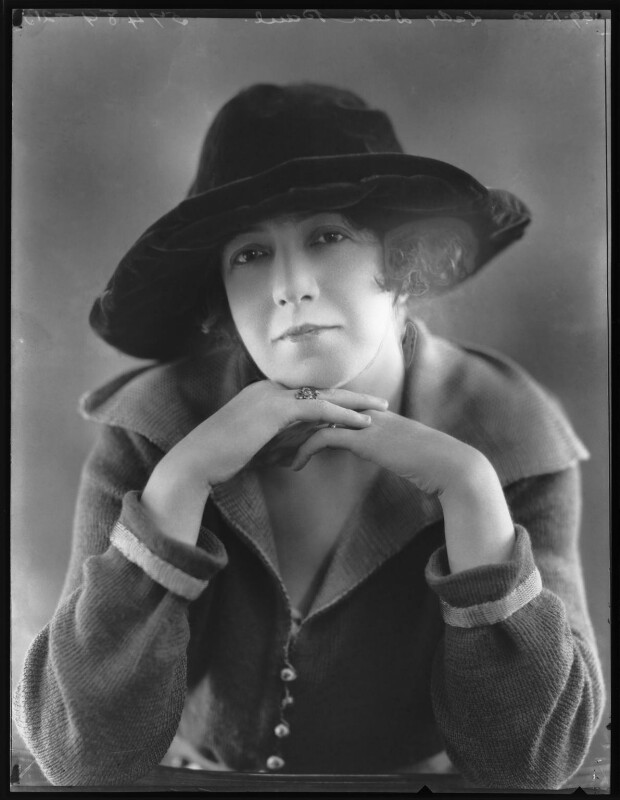
- Poldowski (Régine (née Wieniawski), Lady Dean Paul), by Bassano Ltd, 1920

Background information
- Born: 16 May 1879
- Died: 28 January 1932 (aged 52)

Poldowski was the professional pseudonym of a Belgian-born British composer and pianist born Régine Wieniawski (16 May 1879 – 28 January 1932), daughter of the Polish violinist and composer Henryk Wieniawski. Some of her early works were published under the name Irène Wieniawska. She married Sir Aubrey Dean Paul, 5th Bt (1869–1961), becoming Lady Dean Paul. Her name appears in a number of forms:

- Régine Wieniawski
- Irène Wieniawska
- Irene Regina Wieniawski or Wieniawska
- Lady Dean Paul
- Lady Irene Dean Paul
- Lady Irene Poldowski Paul
- (Madame) Poldowski, Poldowsky or Poldowska.

== Biography ==
Régine Wieniawski was born on 16 May 1879 in Ixelles, Brussels, where her father, the Polish virtuoso violinist and composer Henryk Wieniawski, had earlier settled on his appointment as a professor of the Brussels Conservatory. Her mother was an Englishwoman, Isabelle Bessie Wieniawski (née Hampton), the niece of Irish pianist and composer George Alexander Osborne (who studied under Johann Peter Pixis, François-Joseph Fétis and Friedrich Kalkbrenner and was a close friend of Frédéric Chopin and Hector Berlioz) and a member of a London family that had had associations with Rossini, Meyerbeer, Jenny Lind, Michael William Balfe and Anton Rubinstein. She was named Régine after her paternal grandmother Regina Wolff.

It is sometimes stated that Régine was born a few weeks after the death of her father. However, this seems to be an error caused by some earlier sources stating she was born in May 1880 rather than May 1879; her father died on 31 March 1880, in Moscow, while on a concert tour, when Irene was ten months old.

Her musical studies are also disputed. She initially studied piano with a Miss Ellis. She told her official biographers that she entered the Brussels Conservatoire at age 12, studying piano with Pierre Storck and composition with François-Auguste Gevaert. Later she continued her studies in London with Michael Hambourg and Percy Pitt. After her marriage she returned to Paris to study with André Gedalge, and after her first child died she studied under Vincent d'Indy at the Schola Cantorum de Paris. However, some of the above is contradicted by the fact that her name does not appear in any records of the Brussels Conservatory.

In 1887, aged eight, she was introduced to and befriended by Nellie Melba, then making her debut at La Monnaie. In 1893, aged 14, she publicly performed some of her own compositions. She was a neighbour of Octave Maus and her songs Cortège and Cythère were dedicated to Maus and his wife Madeleine.

In 1896, Régine Wieniawski and her mother moved to London. There she published some early works under the name Irène Wieniawska. In 1901, she married a descendant of the 1st Duke of Marlborough, Sir Aubrey Edward Henry Dean Paul, 5th Bt (19 October 1869 – 16 January 1961) to whom she had been introduced by Nellie Melba. She thus became Lady Dean Paul, and adopted British nationality, but continued to publish works as "Irène Wieniawska" They had three children:

- Aubrey Donald Fitzwarren Severin Dean Paul (1902–04)
- Sir Brian Kenneth "Napper" Dean Paul, 6th Bt. (1904–72; an amateur muralist and opium taker, whose portrait was painted by Lucian Freud)
- Brenda Irene Isabelle Dean Paul (1907–59); she became a well-known actress and "society drug addict" who was frequently arrested on charges of possession. She spent time in Holloway Prison. She died of a drug overdose in her flat.

The early death of Lady Dean Paul's first-born son devastated her and ultimately led to the break-up of her marriage. It inspired three works, the songs Soir and Berceuse d'Armorique, and the violin-piano piece Berceuse pour l'enfant mourant. She then adopted the pseudonym Poldowski.

Gervase Elwes introduced her Paul Verlaine songs to the English concert stage in 1912 at the Queen's Hall. These songs then had a great vogue in Paris and this performance made a deep impression. He had been impressed with her music ever since he had first encountered it almost 20 years earlier, in 1893 in Brussels. He felt they showed "great originality and for her age, great finish". Elwes encountered her again in 1903, in Brussels, and she dedicated two of her songs to him. A concert of her songs she was to have given in the United States with Gervase Elwes in 1921 had to be cancelled when he was killed in a rail accident in Boston.

She moved to Brussels in the spring of 1912 after Queen Elisabeth of the Belgians had expressed a desire to hear her. She accompanied Émile Chaumont in the premiere of her Violin Sonata in D minor, which was dedicated to Octave Maus, and was then performed in Paris by her close friend, the French pianist Lazare Lévy, whom she had met in Miss Ellis's class. Lévy premiered her piano solo piece Caledonian Market, in 1923. In January 1912 her friend Henry Wood conducted the premieres of her Suite miniature and Nocturnes at the Sunday Concerts. In 1913 she returned to Brussels for the last time to accompany Jane Bathori-Engel in four of her Verlaine settings.

She and her family converted to Roman Catholicism in 1916. In 1919, at the Queen's Hall, Henry Wood accompanied Poldowski at the premiere of her piano and orchestra piece, "Pat Malone's Wake". She fell seriously ill in the autumn of 1913. In August 1919 Poldowski moved to the United States, where her "symphonic opera" Silence was published despite serious financial issues. Her opera Silence was premiered in London on 29 March 1920 as part of the Komisarjevsky-Rosing Russian Matinee Season at the Duke of York's Theatre. Polodowski legally separated from her husband in 1921.

She returned to London in 1922; her regular visitors included playwright Alfred Sutro, mezzo-soprano Marguerite d'Alvarez, conductor Eugène Goossens, fils, harpsichordist Violet Gordon-Woodhouse, violinist Paul Kochanski and the composers Peter Warlock and George Gershwin.

Her 1923 series of midday recitals at the Hyde Park Hotel, known as The International Concerts of La Libre Esthétique, attracted Arthur Rubinstein, Jacques Thibaud and the London String Quartet. She also opened a fashionable haute couture boutique where she produced several creations for the British Royal Family. On a 1925 tour of Spain, she was given a gift of a diamond bracelet by the King and Queen of Spain.

== Death ==
She later became seriously ill with pneumonia, her right lung was removed, and she died of a heart attack on 28 January 1932, in London, aged 52.

== Music ==
Poldowski was a gifted composer of songs; her style shows strong influences of Claude Debussy. She set 22 French texts of Paul Verlaine, as well as English texts by William Blake, W. B. Yeats, Alfred, Lord Tennyson and others.

=== Songs ===
==== Texts by Paul Verlaine ====
- Trois mélodies sur des poésies de Paul Verlaine
  - 1. Dimanches d'avril
  - 2. Bruxelles
  - 3. En sourdine
- À Clymène
- A poor young shepherd
- Brume
- Circonspection
- Colombine
- Cortège
- Crépuscule du soir mystique
- Cythère
- Dansons la gigue!
- Effet de neige
- Fantoches
- Impression fausse
- L'attente
- Le faune (dedicated to Vladimir Rosing)
- L'heure exquise
- Mandoline
- Spleen
- Sur l'herbe
- Nous deux (Donc, ce sera par un clair jour d'été)

Recently, the complete cycle of 22 songs has been transcribed for chamber ensemble by David Jackson. A recording of the complete cycle by Ensemble 1904, featuring the unpublished 22nd song Nous deux (Donc, ce sera par un clair jour d'été), was to be released by Resonus Classics in 2017.

==== Other texts ====
- Berceuse d'Armorique (Anatole le Braz)
- Dans une musette (Marie Closset)
- Down by the Salley Gardens (W. B. Yeats)
- La passante (her own text)
- Nocturne (des cantilènes) (Jean Moréas)
- Pannyre aux talons d'or (Albert Victor Samain)
- Sérénade (Adolphe Ratté)
- Soir (Albert Victor Samain)

=== Other works ===
Her other works include:

- Silence, symphonic opera. Premiered on 29 March 1920 at the Duke of York's Theatre as part of the Komisarjevsky-Rosing Russian Matinee Season.
- Laughter, operetta
- Nocturnes, orchestra
- Tenements, orchestra
- Pat Malone's Wake, piano and orchestra
- Suite miniature de chansons à danser, wind quintet
- Caledonian Market, suite for piano
- The Hall of Machinery – Wembley, piano
- Sonatine, piano
- Study, piano
- Violin Sonata in D minor
- pieces for violin and piano such as Berceuse de l'Enfant mourant, Largo, Phryne, and Tango. (The Tango was recorded by Jascha Heifetz.)

Many of her larger works are lost. Her complete catalogue of music, including unpublished works, compiled by David Mooney, is available at SMI Music Theses Register.

== Discography ==
- Tango - Jascha Heifetz, violin; Emanuel Bay, piano (17 octobre 1946, RCA)35
- Poldowski, mélodies [27 mélodies] - Élise Gäbele, soprano; Philippe Riga, piano; Sylvain Cremers, hautbois d'amour (2-4 novembre 2006, Musique en Wallonie MEW 0741)36 (OCLC 547232426)
- A Verlaine songbook [5 melodies] - Carolyn Sampson, soprano; Joseph Middleton, piano (janvier 2016, SACD BIS Records) [livret en ligne [archive]] (OCLC 966294235)
- Poldowski Art'songs [23 mélodies] - Angelique Zuluaga, soprano; Gwendolyn Mok, piano; Quatuor à cordes Alexandre; Ryan Zwahlen, hautbois d'amour (12 ,13, 14 février et 26 août 2016 Delos DE 3538)
- Poldowski re/imagined, 22 mélodies sur les poèmes de Paul Verlaine - Ensemble 1904 : Jazmin Black-Grollemund, soprano; Angélique Charlopain, violin; Jérémie Decottignies, double bass; David Jackson, piano & arrangements (28-30 novembre 2016, Resonus Classics RES10196) [CD booklet]
- Violin Sonata in D Minor, British Women Composers - Clare Howick, violin; Sophia Rahman, piano (October 2010, Naxos 8.572291)
- Irena Regina Wieniawska vel Poldowski - Works for violin and piano" - Art Chamber Duo - Jarosław Pietrzak (violin), Julita Przybylska-Nowak (piano) - June 2020, GRANTOR GCD003

== Sources ==
- Eric Blom, Grove's Dictionary of Music and Musicians, 5th ed., 1954
