= Medical treatment during the Second Boer War =

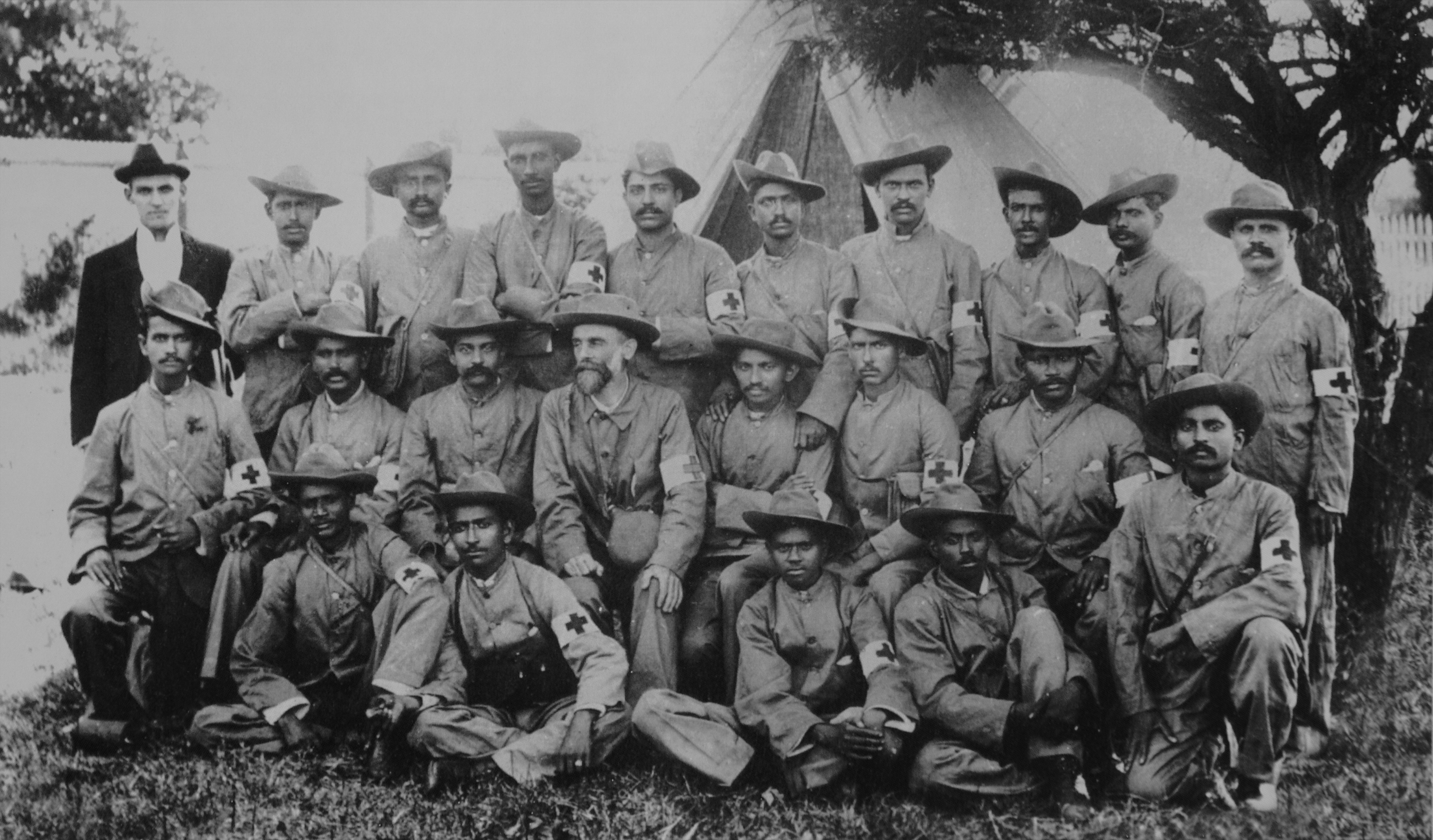
Stretcher-bearers of the Indian Ambulance Corps during the war, including the future leader Mohandas Karamchand Gandhi (Middle row, 5th from left).

The Second Boer War was fought from 11 October 1899 until 31 May 1902, between the British Empire and the two independent Boer republics of the Orange Free State and the South African Republic (Transvaal Republic). It was a lengthy war involving large numbers of troops which ended with the conversion of the Boer republics into British colonies, with a promise of limited self-government. These colonies later formed part of the Union of South Africa.

During the Boer war, 22,000 troops were treated for wounds inflicted during battle. The surgical facilities provided by the British Army were vastly more effective than in previous campaigns. The Medical Department of the army mobilised 151 staff and regimental units. Twenty eight field ambulances, five stationary hospitals and 16 general hospitals were established to deal with casualties. Numerous voluntary organizations set up additional hospitals, medical units and first aid posts. Around one thousand Indians from Natal were shipped to South Africa to help in the recovery effort by transporting the wounded off the battlefields. Even Mahatma Gandhi, who was practising as a lawyer at the time in Durban, was a volunteer, helping recovery efforts in the Battles of Colenso and Spionkop. A second unit was established by Johannesburg and Cape Town Jews and aided both armies.

== See also ==
- Second Boer War
- Military medicine
