= Henryk Wieniawski =

Polish composer, violinist, and pedagogue (1835–1880)

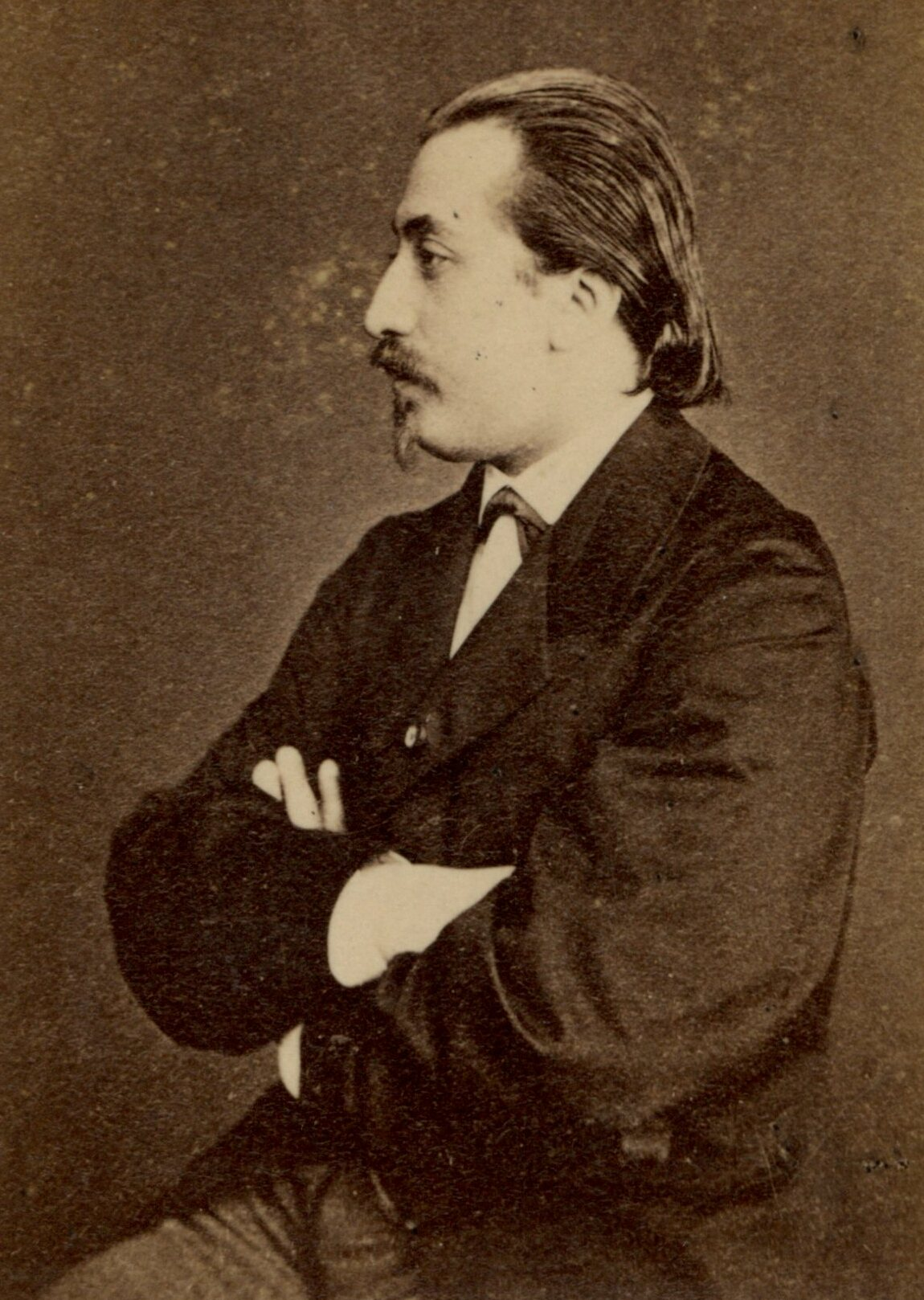
- Photograph by Zakład Fotograficzny "Vezenberg" Petersburg
- Born: 10 July 1835; Lublin, Congress Poland
- Died: 31 March 1880 (aged 44); Moscow, Russian Empire
- Occupations: Composer; violinist
- Era: Romanticism

Henryk Wieniawski (pronounced [vʲɛˈɲafskʲi]; 10 July 1835 – 31 March 1880) was a Polish virtuoso violinist, composer, and pedagogue, who is regarded amongst the most distinguished violinists in history. His younger brother Józef Wieniawski and nephew Adam Tadeusz Wieniawski were also accomplished musicians, as was his daughter Régine, who became a naturalised British subject upon marrying into the peerage and wrote music under the name Poldowski.

== Life ==
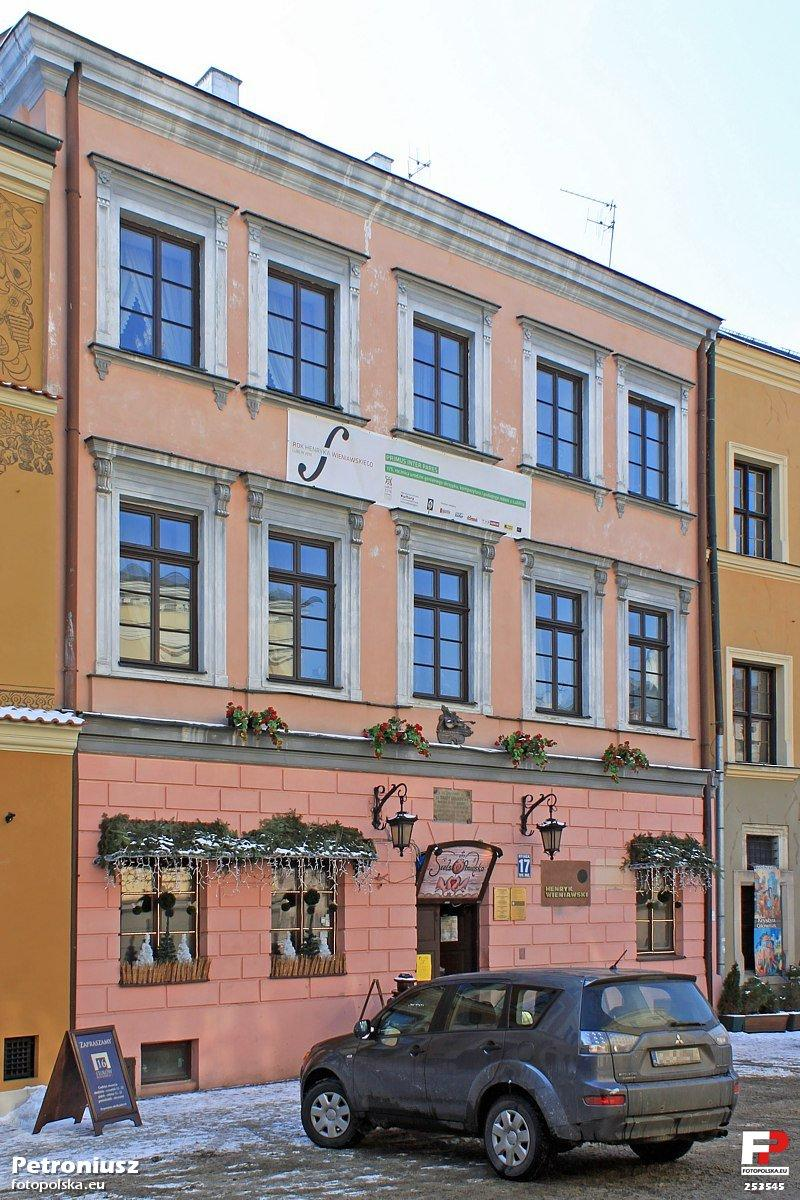
Birthplace of Henryk Wieniawski in Lublin

=== Early life ===
Henryk Wieniawski was born in Lublin, in present-day Poland. His father, Wolf Helman, was the son of a Jewish barber named Herschel Meyer Helman, from Lublin's Jewish neighborhood of Wieniawa. Wolf Helman later changed his name to Tadeusz Wieniawski, taking on the name of his neighborhood to blend into the Polish environment. Prior to obtaining his medical degree, he had converted to Catholicism. He married Regina Wolff, the daughter of a noted Jewish physician from Warsaw, and out of this marriage, Henryk was born.

Henryk's talent for playing the violin was recognized early, and in 1843 he was accepted by the Paris Conservatoire taught by Lambert Massart, where special exceptions were made to admit him, as he wasn't French and was only eight years old. He attended the Conservatoire from 1843 to 1846 and returned for another year in 1849.

=== Touring and teaching ===
After graduation, he toured extensively and gave many recitals, where he was often accompanied by his brother Józef on piano. In 1847, he published his first opus, a Grand Caprice Fantastique, the start of a catalogue of 24 opus numbers.

When his engagement to Isabella Hampton was opposed by her parents, Wieniawski wrote Légende, Op. 17; this work helped her parents change their mind, and the couple married in 1860.

Wieniawski was a player in the Beethoven Quartet Society in London, where he also performed on viola.

At the invitation of Anton Rubinstein, Wieniawski moved to St. Petersburg, where he lived from 1860 to 1872, taught many violin students and led the Russian Musical Society's orchestra and string quartet. From 1872 to 1874, Wieniawski toured the United States with Rubinstein. Wieniawski replaced Henri Vieuxtemps as violin professor at the Conservatoire Royal de Bruxelles in 1875.

=== Decline and death ===
During his residence in Brussels, Wieniawski's health declined, and he often had to stop in the middle of his concerts. He started a tour of Russia in 1879 but was unable to complete it, and was taken to a hospital in Odessa after a concert. On 14 February 1880, Pyotr Ilyich Tchaikovsky's patroness Nadezhda von Meck took him into her home and provided him with medical attention. His friends also arranged a benefit concert to help provide for his family. He died in Moscow a few weeks later from a heart attack and was interred in the Powązki Cemetery in Warsaw.

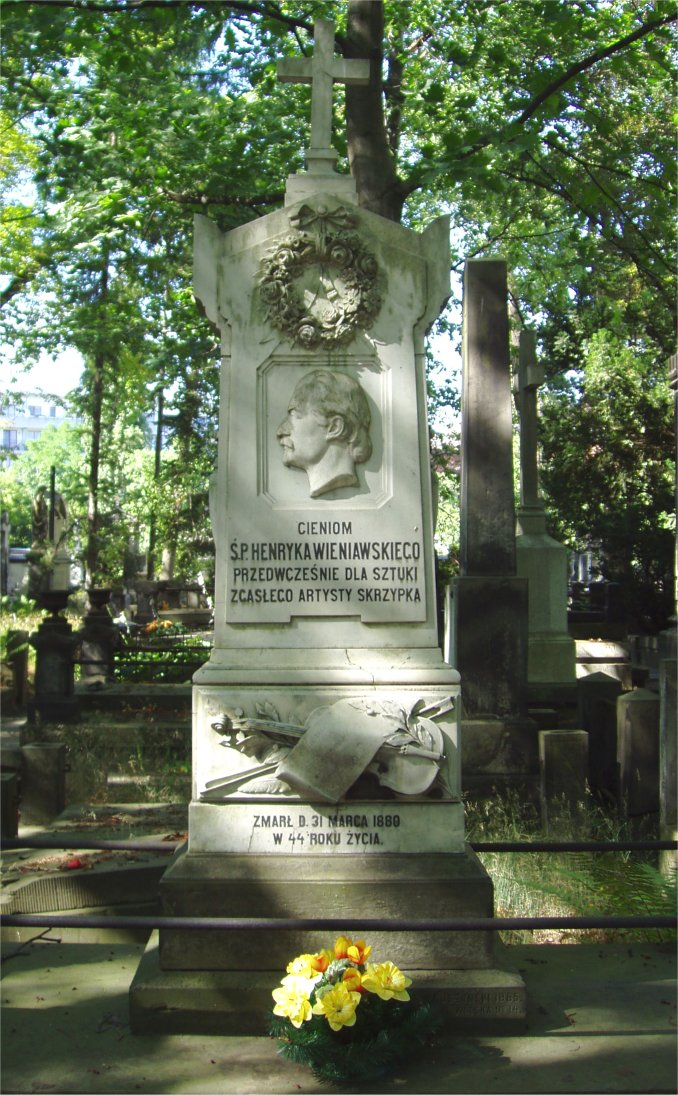
Grave of Henryk Wieniawski at the Powązki Cemetery in Warsaw

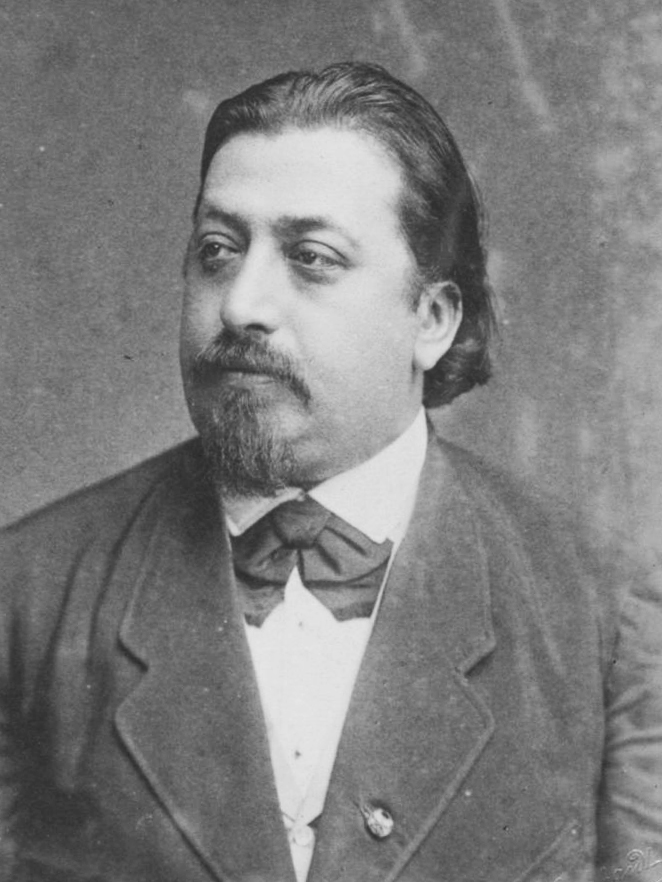
Photograph of Wieniawski by Fritz Luckhardt, Vienna

== Daughters ==
His daughter Régine Wieniawski, born in Brussels the year before his death, also became a composer. She published her early works as "Irène Wieniawska", but after marrying Sir Aubrey Dean Paul and becoming a British subject, she used the pseudonym "Poldowski". Another daughter, Henriette, would go on to marry Joseph Holland Loring in 1904, who was among the victims of the Titanic disaster.

== Works ==
Henryk Wieniawski was considered a violinist of great ability and wrote some very important works in the violin repertoire, including two technically demanding violin concertos, the second of which (in D minor, 1862) is more often performed than the first (in F-sharp minor, 1853). One assessment of violin etudes ranks Wieniawski's Op. 10 L'École moderne: 10 Études-caprices just below the difficulty of the Paganini Caprices.

== Legacy ==
Wieniawski was given a number of posthumous honors. His portrait appeared on a postage stamp of Poland in 1952 and again in 1957. A 100 zloty coin was issued in 1979 bearing his image.

What is commonly called the "Russian bow hold" is sometimes called the "Wieniawski bow hold" as eyewitnesses attending his concerts noted traits of Wieniawski's bow hold that are trademarks of the "Russian bow hold" which was later popularized by Leopold Auer through his many students. Wieniawski was noted to have "an unconventional method of holding his right elbow high, pressing the bow with his index finger above the second joint and stiffening his arm to produce a virtuosic staccato effect." This bow hold allowed him to play what he called a "devil's staccato" with ease, which he implemented in his teaching in order to develop students' technique.

The first violin competition named after Wieniawski took place in Warsaw in 1935. Ginette Neveu took first prize, David Oistrakh second, and Henri Temianka third. The International Henryk Wieniawski Violin Competition has been held every five years since 1952.

== Compositions ==
Published works, with opus numbers

- Grand caprice fantastique, Op. 1
- Allegro de Sonate, Op. 2
- Souvenir de Posen, Op. 3
- Polonaise de Concert No. 1, Op. 4 (sometimes known as Polonaise brillante)
- Adagio élégiaque, Op. 5
- Souvenir de Moscow, 2 Russian Romances, Op. 6 (in this work he quoted Alexander Egorovich Varlamov's song The Red Sarafan)
- Capriccio-Valse, Op. 7
- Grand duo polonais, for violin and piano, Op. 8
- Romance sans paroles et rondo elegant, Op. 9
- L'École moderne, 10 Études-Caprices, for violin solo, Op. 10
- Le Carnaval Russe, Improvisations and Variations, Op. 11
- 2 Mazurkas de Salon: Sielanka et Piesn Polska (Chanson polonaise), Op. 12
- Fantasie pastorale, Op. 13 (Lost)
- Concerto No. 1 in F♯ minor, Op. 14
- Thème original varié, Op. 15
- Scherzo-Tarantelle, Op. 16
- Légende, Op. 17
- 8 Études-Caprices, for 2 violins, Op. 18
- 2 Mazurkas caractéristiques: Obertass et Dudziarz (Le Ménétrier), Op. 19 (NB.: no 2 is known as both "The Bagpipe Player" [ABRSM Vln Gr VIII Syllabus] and "The Village Fiddler" [Naxos Records])
- Fantaisie brillante sur Faust de Gounod, Op. 20
- Polonaise brillante, Op. 21
- Concerto No. 2 in D minor, Op. 22
- Gigue in E minor, Op. 23
- Fantasie orientale, Op. 24

Unpublished works, and works without opus numbers

- Wariacje na Temat Własnego Mazurka (c. 1847)
- Aria with Variations in E major (before 1848)
- Fantasia and Variations in E major (1848)
- Nocturne for solo violin (1848)
- Romance (c. 1848)
- Rondo Alla Polacca in E minor (1848)
- Duo Concertant on themes from Donizetti's Lucia di Lammermoor (c. 1850)
- Duo Concertant na Temat Hymnu Rosyjskiego A. Lwowa (c. 1850)
- Duo Concertant na Temat Rosyjskiej Melodii Ludowej (c. 1850)
- Fantasia on themes from Meyerbeer's Le prophète (oc. 1850)
- Mazur Wiejski (c. 1850)
- Fantasia on themes from Grétry's Richard Coeur-de-lion (c. 1851)
- Duet on themes from Finnish songs (c. 1851)
- Two Mazurkas (1851)
- March (1851)
- Kujawiak in A minor (1853)
- Variations on the Russian hymn (c. 1851)
- Variations on Polish folk song "Jechał Kozak Zza Dunaju" (c. 1851)
- Variations on the Austrian Hymn (1853)
- Rozumiem, pieśń na głos z fortepianem (1854)
- Souvenir de Lublin, concert polka (c. 1855)
- Fantasia on themes from Bellini's La sonnambula (c. 1855)
- Reminiscences of San Francisco (c. 1874)
- Kujawiak in C major
- Polonaise triomphale
- Rêverie in F sharp minor, for viola and piano
- Violin Concerto No. 3 in A minor? (1878, unpublished, disappeared? Premiered in Moscow, 27 December 1878)
