= Paul baronets of Paulville (1794) =

Escutcheon of the Paul baronets of Paulville

The Paul baronetcy of Paulville in the County of Carlow was created in the Baronetage of Ireland on 20 January 1794 for Joshua Paul. He was the son of Christmas Paul, Member of the Parliament of Ireland for Waterford City. The title became extinct on the death of the 6th Baronet in 1961.

== Paul baronets, of Paulville (1794) ==
- Sir Joshua Paul, 1st Baronet (1748–1799)
- Sir Joshua Christmas Paul, 2nd Baronet (1773–1842)
- Sir Robert Joshua Paul, 3rd Baronet (1820–1898)
- Sir William Joshua Paul, 4th Baronet (1851–1912)
- Sir Robert Joshua Paul, 5th Baronet (1883–1955)
- Sir William Edmund Jeffrey Paul, 6th Baronet (1885–1961)
