= Paul baronets =

Set index for Paul baronets

There have been three baronetcies created for persons with the surname Paul, one in the Baronetage of Great Britain, one in the Baronetage of Ireland and one in the Baronetage of the United Kingdom. All three creations are extinct.

- Paul baronets of Rodborough (first creation, 1762)
- Paul baronets of Paulville (1794)
- Paul baronets of Rodborough (second creation, 1821)
