= Strahan, Paul & Bates =

Former London private bank, collapsed in 1855

Snow's Bank, 217 Strand, London in 1808; later the premises of Strahan, Paul & Bates

Strahan, Paul & Bates was a London private banking house founded in the 17th century and with a reputation for respectability. The bank failed in 1855 with liabilities eventually estimated at £750,000 (equivalent to £70,000,000 in 2025). The subsequent bankruptcy proceedings revealed that customers' securities had been sold or otherwise disposed of by the partners and the proceeds had been used to support the bank's failing finances. Its three partners were prosecuted and convicted for fraudulently disposing of securities entrusted to the bank for safe custody.

The partners, William Strahan, Sir John Dean Paul, and Robert Makin Bates, were tried in October 1855. They were convicted and each was sentenced to fourteen years' transportation. The sentences were subsequently commuted, and none of the three was transported. They were released in 1858 and 1859.

The Strahan, Paul & Bates collapse was notable not simply for the size of the financial loss but for the social standing of the people involved. The bank was an exceptionally old and highly respectable institution, and Paul in particular was associated publicly with religious and charitable causes. The discovery that its partners had used its customers' securities to support a business that had become seriously insolvent generated considerable contemporary shock.

Although no major banking statute was enacted specifically in response to the failure, it strengthened contemporary public opinion in favour of joint-stock banks rather than private banks.

== Background ==
The firm was one of London's oldest private banks, tracing its origins to its foundation in 1660 by Thomas Snow. During the Commonwealth of England, Snow and Walton conducted business as pawnbrokers. In the 19th century the firm's partners still had among their archives ledgers going back to the time of King Charles II.

In 1813, Snow's descendant Robert Snow went into partnership with William Sandby and Sir John Dean Paul, 1st Baronet, until Sandby died in 1826, whereupon Snow and Paul became sole partners. In 1823, John Dean Paul Jr. also joined the firm as a nominal partner without a share of the firm's profits.

Robert Snow's son William inherited a large fortune from his great uncle on the condition he assumed the name Strahan, and in 1832 he joined his brother Robert Jr. and father to create Snow, Snow, Strahan, Paul and Paul. When Snow's father Robert Sr. died in 1835, the firm rebranded as Snow, Strahan, Paul and Paul. John Dean Paul Jr. succeeded his father as baronet on his death in 1852, becoming Sir John Dean Paul, 2nd Baronet.

When Robert Snow Jr. retired in 1841, Robert Bates was made a third partner due to his extensive faithful service. Bates had entered the bank as a junior clerk in 1820, and rose to become managing clerk. Unlike Strahan and Paul, Bates was a nominal partner only and was remunerated through a fixed salary.

After the bank's failure in 1855, the Court of Bankruptcy's historical resumé of the firm's proceedings over the previous half century showed that the firm's former partners Robert Snow Sr., William Sandby and Sir John Dean Paul, 1st Baronet, had been borrowing their clients' money as far back as 1816, amounting to £29,000 at that date (equivalent to £2,440,000 in 2025), and the various partners' borrowings had increased over the subsequent decades. When Sir John Dean Paul died in 1852, his son succeeded to the active role of a partner, but in fact inherited an insolvency.

== Failure of the bank ==
=== The partners ===
By the early 1850s, the partners were William Strahan, Sir John Dean Paul, 2nd Baronet, and Robert Makin Bates. The firm's social position was an important element in its reputation. Strahan was regarded as a wealthy and highly respectable member of London society, was appointed to the boards of various companies, and had been given the honorary title of High Sheriff of Surrey. Sir John Dean Paul held many honorary positions on the committees of almost all the evangelical Church of England societies of London, and was regarded as a "model baronet, a good banker and a pious man". Contemporary observers consequently regarded the eventual discovery of fraud as especially shocking.

=== Bankruptcy and criminal prosecution ===
Sir John Dean Paul, William Strahan, and Robert Bates appear before magistrates at Bow Street Police Court on 11 July 1855, after their arrest.

By 1850 the bank was barely solvent, even taking into account the partners' considerable private property and personal assets. The bank had incurred substantial losses through speculative and commercial ventures, including large advances to the Mostyn Colliery, and to Messrs. J. H. & E. F. Gandell for railway and drainage projects. The bank was also conducting agency business as a financial intermediary for the armed forces: while its main business included acting as army agents, a separate navy agency operated as Halford & Co. In desperate need of cash, the partners sold bonds kept on behalf of clients, intending to buy them back before the clients noticed that they were missing. However, by 1854 it was rumoured in the City of London that the bank was insolvent and Strahan was forced to confess that clients' private bonds entrusted to them had been sold.

The bank suspended payment on 11 June 1855. Its liabilities were subsequently estimated at £750,000 (equivalent to £70,000,000 in 2025). The bankruptcy proceedings revealed that securities deposited by customers for safe custody, worth about £113,625 (equivalent to £10,580,000 in 2025), had been sold or otherwise disposed of to support the bank. The list of securities was voluntarily handed into the court signed by the three members of the firm. Criminal proceedings were thereupon taken against them.

Criminal proceedings were taken against them for unlawfully selling bonds belonging to one of their clients and other counts, and the three partners were tried on 26–27 October 1855 at the Central Criminal Court, with The Bankers' Magazine devoting an extensive report to the proceedings. The trial was witnessed by heads of principal banks, more than one peer of the realm, MPs, and also, "as is always the case on these extraordinary occasions, there was a considerable attendance of fashionably-dressed ladies." Strahan's counsel claimed that the sale of the bonds was made solely by Paul, and there was no proof that Strahan was privy to the transaction; Bates claimed to have been totally ignorant of the whole affair. The trial also revealed that the partners had attempted to raise loans, using customers' deposits as collateral without their knowledge or permission. The three were convicted of unlawfully converting bonds entrusted to them for their own use and benefit. Each partner was sentenced to fourteen years' transportation, although none was ultimately transported. Bates, who was considered the least culpable, was released from prison in 1858, and Strahan and Paul were released in 1859.

== Immediate consequences ==
The failure caused substantial losses to depositors and other creditors and, more unusually, to customers whose securities had been held in custody, with creditors eventually receiving only about 3s 2d in the pound (less than 16%). Some of those affected included the prime minister Lord Palmerston, the Duke of Rutland, many small investors, and numerous religious and charitable institutions. The case attracted particular attention because the securities were not ordinary deposits or investments exposed to the bank's commercial risks: instead, they had been entrusted to the bankers for safekeeping.

The revelation also damaged confidence in other private banks. Contemporary reports described customers withdrawing funds from private banking houses and seeking assurances that securities held for them were still in existence. Some business moved towards the expanding joint-stock banks that were establishing branches in the City, including the joint-stock London and Westminster Bank, which acquired the former Strahan, Paul & Bates premises at 217 Strand and opened a new Temple Bar branch there.

== Contemporary reaction ==
The scandal attracted unusually strong public criticism because of the partners' social standing and reputation. Sir John Dean Paul was prominent in religious and charitable circles, which made the discovery that the bank had appropriated customers' property particularly damaging to contemporary notions of commercial and personal respectability. The Times commented, "We have never had a grosser instance of villany than that of this 'most seeming virtuous' banker who, with his pockets stuffed full of the securities which he had abstracted from his customers, could go down to Exeter- hall, and take the chair of some religious meeting of which he was the leader and the idol."

The bankers' activities were regarded as a clear example of a breach of trust, and later accounts included Strahan, Paul & Bates, alongside the Fauntleroy forgery, among notorious episodes in the history of banking fraud.

The failure also became an example in contemporary discussions of the relative security of private and joint-stock banking, and the shift in London's banking structure. The Economist observed in June 1855 that the failure was likely to strengthen the case for joint-stock banks.

The favourable treatment of the three men during their incarceration attracted further controversy: the advantages they received during their imprisonment in Newgate became the subject of an investigation by the Middlesex magistrates, with the prison governor acknowledging that the prisoners had been allowed visitors and privileges outside the normal regulations.

The case had literary resonances in the financial fiction of the period. Charles Dickens was writing Little Dorrit when Strahan, Paul & Bates failed in June 1855. Although the novel's failed financier Mr Merdle is generally associated more directly with the later fraudster John Sadleir (whose financial collapse and suicide occurred in 1856), the Strahan failure was among the contemporary series of financial scandals that provided the novel's background.

An earlier and more ironic literary connection involved the novelist Catherine Gore. Her 1843 novel The Banker's Wife, dedicated to Paul's father Sir John Dean Paul, 1st Baronet, contained a dishonest banker whose behaviour was later noted by the Dictionary of National Biography to resemble Paul's own conduct. Gore herself lost £20,000 (equivalent to £1,862,000 in 2025) in the collapse of Strahan, Paul & Bates. The Court of Bankruptcy's resumé showed that Paul's late father had borrowed £17,280 (equivalent to £2,086,000 in 2025) by the time of his death in 1852.

== Banking and legal consequences ==
Apart from the fraudulent disposal of securities, the collapse prompted criticism of the partners' speculative activities and of their use of banking resources to support the enterprises in which the bank had become heavily involved. Contemporary accounts portrayed the firm as having moved beyond conventional banking into unusual activities including colliery operation, and the financing of railway and drainage schemes.

The collapse was an example of the dangers of combining banking with speculative enterprise, and of the vulnerability of customers when bankers were permitted to treat entrusted property as part of their own resources. However, its immediate institutional effect was limited; it contributed to the contemporary crisis of confidence in the old private-banking houses and to the continuing expansion of joint-stock banking, but did not result in a general banking panic. The Economist treated the failure as an exceptional case rather than evidence of a general weakness in London's banking system, suggesting that it would strengthen public opinion in favour of joint-stock banks. No major banking statute was enacted specifically in response to the failure, and neither did the episode produce a new system of supervision of private banks or an immediate statutory requirement for the segregation of customers' securities. The principal immediate changes were practical and reputational: greater concern about the custody of securities, increased scrutiny of private bankers, and a loss of confidence which benefited competing joint-stock banks.

The criminal proceedings also raised a legal issue concerning the relationship between bankruptcy and criminal liability. The partners had disclosed their misconduct during the earlier bankruptcy proceedings and argued that the disclosure protected them from subsequent prosecution. The courts rejected this argument, allowing criminal proceedings for the fraudulent disposal of the securities to proceed.

Wider banking legislation was introduced later in the 1850s, but this was not due directly to the Strahan, Paul & Bates failure: the banking system was already undergoing substantial structural change, and other failures, notably that of the Royal British Bank and the Tipperary Joint Stock Bank in 1856, contributed to subsequent debate over banking regulation and corporate finance.

The case became one of the better-known Victorian examples of a banker being convicted for breach of trust in relation to customers' securities. Later accounts placed it alongside earlier banking frauds such as the Fauntleroy forgery case and later scandals involving joint-stock banks. By the end of the 19th century the episode was still recalled as one of the notable cases of Victorian banking fraud. Later writers emphasised the combination of imprudent lending, speculative investment, concealment of losses and the fraudulent use of customers' securities. The collapse has consequently been treated as an example of the interaction between managerial incompetence and financial fraud in mid-19th-century British banking.

== See also ==
- City of Glasgow Bank
- Henry Fauntleroy
- History of banking in the United Kingdom
- Overend, Gurney and Company
- Royal British Bank
- John Sadleir

== Sources ==
- The Bankers' Magazine (November 1855). "Trial of Messrs. Strahan, Paul, and Bates". The Bankers' Magazine and Journal of the Money Market. 15: 743–762.
- The Bankers' Magazine (June 1887). "Stray Leaves from Banking". The Bankers' Magazine and Journal of the Money Market. 47: 519.
- Barker, George Fisher Russell (1895). "Paul, John Dean" . Dictionary of National Biography. Vol. 44. pp. 73–74.
- Boase, George Clement (1890). "Gore, Catherine Grace Frances" . Dictionary of National Biography. Vol. 22. pp. 236–238.
- British Banking History Society (2024). "Strahan, Paul & Bates, London". British Banking History Society.
- Douglas-Fairhurst, Robert (21 October 2008). "Financial crisis: We should turn to Charles Dickens in hard times, not just Little Dorrit". The Telegraph.
- The Economist (16 June 1855). "The Bankers' Gazette". The Economist. 13 (616): 656.
- Evans, David Morier (1859). Facts, Failures, and Frauds: Revelations, Financial, Mercantile, Criminal. London: Groombridge & Sons.
- The Gentleman's Magazine (1844). "Sheriffs for the Year 1844". The Gentleman's Magazine. Vol. 21. p. 307.
- Gilbart, James William (1855). "A Ten Years' Retrospect of London Banking". Journal of the Statistical Society of London. 18 (4).
- Gilbart, James William (1865). The Elements of Banking. London: Longman, Green, Longman, Roberts, & Green.
- Griffiths, Arthur (1884). The Chronicles of Newgate. Vol. II. London: Chapman and Hall. pp. 379–382.
- Griffiths, Arthur (1905). Prisons Over Seas: Deportation and Colonization; British and American Prisons of To-day. The History and Romance of Crime. London: The Grolier Society. pp. 181–185.
- Household Words (1855). "Law and Crime". Household Narrative of Current Events. p. 269.
- The Institutional History Society (2019). "William Strahan – The Bent Banker". The Institutional History Society.
- Jackson, David (2025). "7 Brunswick Square: An Incomplete House History". The Regency Town House.
- Jacobs, Jake (2018). "Defalcations, Swindles, and Fraud: Ungentlemanly Capitalism in Victorian Babylon, 1800 – 1899 Examining the Need for Revision of Cain and Hopkins' Model of Gentlemanly Capitalism" (PDF). The King's Student Law Review. 9 (1): 40–45.
- Johnson, Paul (2010). Making the Market: Victorian Origins of Corporate Capitalism. Cambridge: Cambridge University Press. pp. 130–135. ISBN 978-0521857833.
- Lawrence, J. (1844). London In the Nineteenth Century: a Poem in three books. J & G Lewis. p. 42.
- The Leader (28 July 1855). "Strahan and Co.'s Bankruptcy". The Leader. Vol. VI, no. 279. p. 729.
- The Leader (20 October 1855). "Treatment of Strahan, Paul, and Bates in Newgate". The Leader. Vol. VI, no. 291. p. 1006.
- The Leader (8 October 1859). "Law, Police and Casualties". The Leader. No. 498. p. 1121.
- Old Bailey (1855). "William Strahan. John Dean Paul. Robert Makin Bates. Deception; fraud. 22nd October 1855". The Proceedings of the Old Bailey.
- Partridge, Matthew (18 November 2020). "Great frauds in history… William Strahan's stolen bonds". MoneyWeek. Future Publishing Limited.
- Poovey, Mary (2001). "Economics and Finance". In Jordan, John O. (ed.). The Cambridge Companion to Charles Dickens. Cambridge: Cambridge University Press. pp. 388–404. ISBN 978-0521660167.
- Punch (1855). "End of year footnote to How to Restore Confidence in Private Banks (7 July 1855, no. 730, p. 10 )". Punch. Vol. 29. p. 10.
- The Spectator (15 December 1855). "The Tale of the House that Snow Built". The Spectator. Vol. 28, no. 1433. p. 1297.
- The Strand Magazine (January 1891). "The Story of the Strand". The Strand Magazine. Vol. 1, no. 1. p. 6.
- The Times (19 October 1855). "Mrs. Gore and Strahan". The Times. p. 9.
- Turner, B. B. (1897). Chronicles of the Bank of England (PDF). London: Swann Sonnenschein & Co. p. 186.
- Williams, Geoffrey Fain (26 April 2012). "Trust But Verify: Fraud in Victorian Banking and Its Diminishment". SSRN. Elsevier Inc. p. 10.
