= Sir John Dean Paul, 1st Baronet =

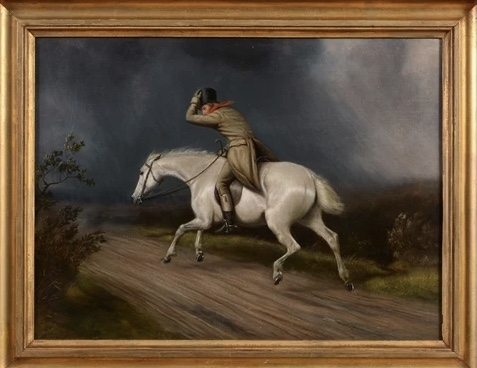
Sir John Dean Paul, “The Country Doctor”

Sir John Dean Paul, 1st Baronet (December 1775 – 16 January 1852), of Rodborough, was an English landowner, banker, painter, and occasional author.

Most of Paul’s works as a painter were landscapes and paintings of horses. In 1821 he was created a baronet, a revival of an honour previously held by another branch of the Paul family.

His wife was Frances Eleanor Simpson, daughter of John Simpson, of Bradley Hall, Co. Durham, and Lady Anne Lyon. Frances, Lady Paul was the sister of the Baroness Ravensworth, as well as the niece of the Baroness Bradford and also a cousin of Lt Gen Sir Frederick Lester.

By his wife, Paul was the father of Sir John Dean Paul, 2nd Baronet (1802–1868), banker and fraudster. In the 1855 collapse of Strahan, Paul & Bates, the Court of Bankruptcy's resumé showed that the late 1st Baronet had borrowed £17,280 (equivalent to £2,086,000 in 2025) from the banking firm in which he was a partner by the time of his death in 1852, and the firm was insolvent.

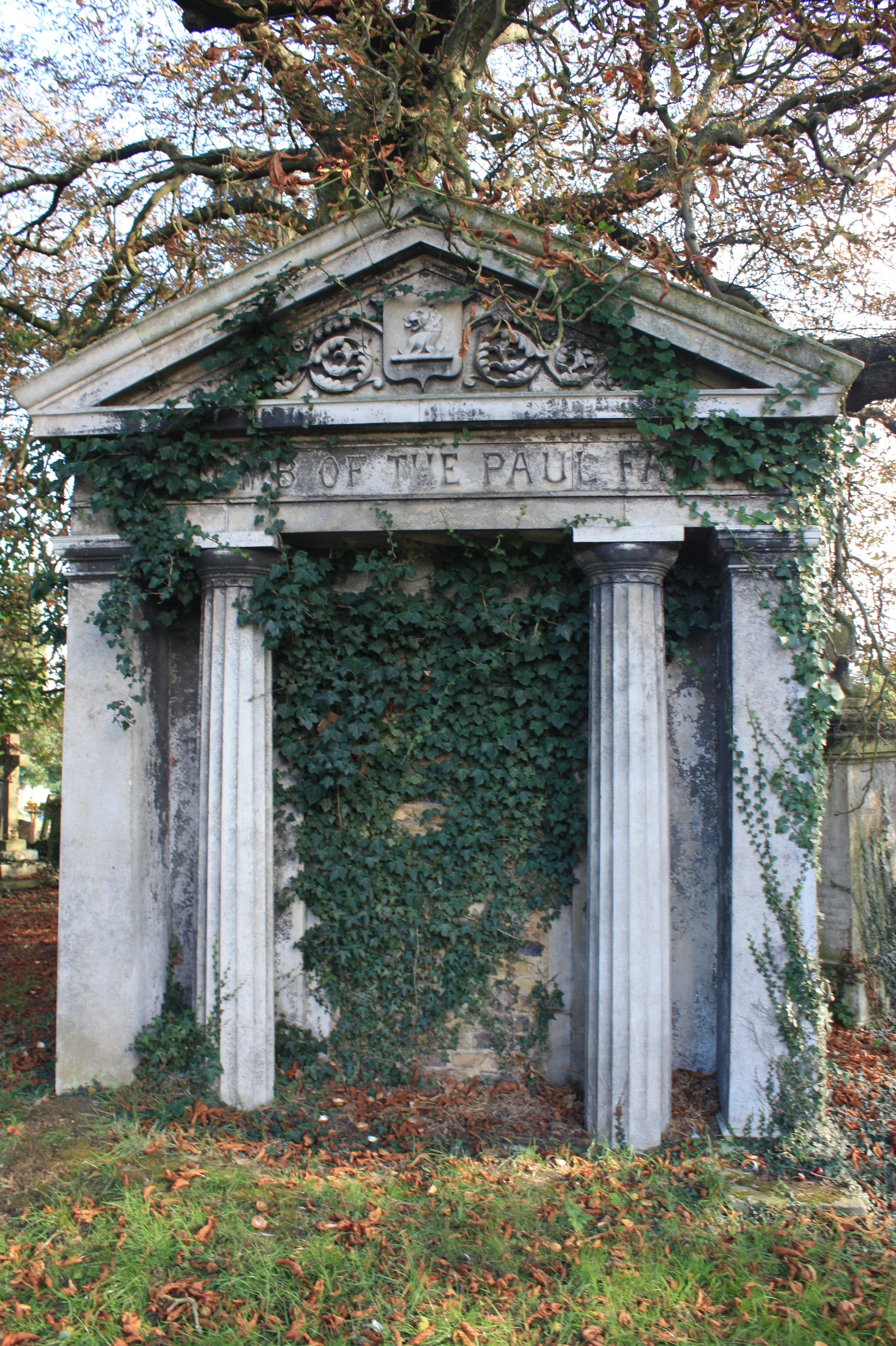
Mausoleum of Paul, Kensal Green Cemetery

He died in 1852 and was buried in Kensal Green Cemetery, where his mausoleum was designed by John Griffith, the architect of the main cemetery buildings.

== Publications ==
- Journal of a party of pleasure to Paris in the month of August, 1802: by which any person intending to take such a journey may form an accurate idea of the expence that would attend it, and the amusement he would probably receive: together with thirteen views from nature, illustrative of French scenery (London: T. Cadell, Jun. & W. Davies, 1802)
  - Journal d'un voyage à Paris au mois d'août 1802 (Paris, A. Picard et fils, 1913)
- The Man of Ton: a satire (London: Henry Colburn, 1828)
- ABC of Fox Hunting, with 26 coloured illustrations (London: J. Mitchell Royal Library, c. 1870)
