= List of compositions for two violins =

This is a list of classical repertoire for two violins – either unaccompanied, with orchestra, or with piano.

== Two solo violins ==
- Kalevi Aho: Lamento (2001)
- Gilbert Amy: 6 Duos (2002)
- Julian Anderson: Ring Dance (1987)
- Christian Asplund:
  - Choreutics
  - One Eternal Round
  - Neuf Regards
  - Hope #4
- Milton Babbitt: Arrivals and Departures (1994)
- Béla Bartók: 44 Duos, Sz. 98, BB 104 (1931)
- Ludwig van Beethoven:
  - Duet in A major for two violins, WoO 34 (1822)
  - Canon in A major for two violins, WoO 35 (1825)
- Luciano Berio: Duetti (1983)
- Charles Auguste de Bériot:
  - 3 Grandi Studi, Op. 43 (1843)
  - 3 Duos concertants, Op. 57 (1847)
  - 12 Petits duos faciles, Op. 87 (1853)
  - 6 Duos caractéristiques, Op. 113 (1863)
- Luigi Boccherini: 6 Duos, Op. 3 (1761)
- Gavin Bryars: Die letzten Tage (1992)
- Howard J. Buss: Time Capsule (2002)
- Unsuk Chin: Gran Cadenza (2018)
- Peter Maxwell Davies: A Little Thank You to Dave (2005)
- Edison Denisov: Sonata (1958)
- Franco Donatoni: Duet No. 2 (1995)
- Amos Elkana: Mostly cloudy (2023)
- Josef Bohuslav Foerster: Little Suite, Op. 183a (1944)
- Géza Frid:
  - Twenty Duos, Op. 37
  - Paganini Variations for two violin ensembles or two violins, Op. 77
- Robert Fuchs:
  - 20 Duos, Op. 55 (1896)
  - Phantasiestücke, 16 Duos, Op. 105 (1915)
- Reinhold Glière: 12 Duos, Op. 49 (1909)
- Vladimír Godár: Violin Duets, 72 pieces for two violins (1981) - I. 24 Duets; II. 40 Duets (Melodiarium); III. Suite for Two Violins
- Henryk Górecki: Sonata for Two Violins, Op. 10 (1961)
- Georg Friedrich Haas: Fuga (2009)
- Alois Hába: Duo for 6th-tone violins, Op. 49 (1937)
- Johan Halvorsen: Concert Caprice over Norwegian Melodies [Norwegian Rhapsody] for two Violins (composed 1894, printed posth. 1946)
- John Harbison: Fanfares and Reflection (1990)
- Joseph Haydn:
  - 6 Sonatas, Op. 6 (1796)
  - Duo, Hob.VI:C2, C3, D4, F3, G3, G4, A2
- Swan Hennessy: Sonatina, Op. 78 (c.1928–29)
- Paul Hindemith:
  - Kanonische Variationen (1931)
  - 14 leichte Stücke (1931)
- Vagn Holmboe: Sværm, Op. 190a (1992)
- Arthur Honegger: Sonatine (1920)
- Nigel Keay: Two-Step Distance (2020)
- Drago Kocakov: Intimus (1951)
- György Kurtág: Triptic, Op. 45 (2007)
- Jean-Marie Leclair
  - 6 Sonatas, Op.3 (1730)
  - 6 Sonatas, Op.12 (1747)
- Ana Leira Carnero: Carnavalito XXI (2021)
- György Ligeti: Baladă şi joc (1950)
- Alvin Lucier: Love Song, for two violinists whose instruments are connected by a cable attached to the bridge (2016)
- Darius Milhaud:
  - Sonatina, Op. 221 (1940)
  - Duo, Op. 258 (1945)
- Carl Nielsen: Violin Duet, CNW 48
- Luigi Nono: Hay que caminar, soñando (1989)
- Michael Nyman: Two Violins, for two amplified violins (1981)
- Allan Pettersson: Seven sonatas (1951)
- Ignaz Pleyel:
  - Duos for 2 violins (2 flutes or violin, flute), B.507-512 (1788)
  - Violin duos, B.513-524 (1789), B.534A-537 (1799), 538-543 (1806)
- Gerhard Präsent:
  - Vier Tänze für zwei Violinen (Four Dances for Two Violins), Op. 24 ()
  - Easy Duos, Op. 56
  - Green Music, Op. 72
- Sergei Prokofiev: Sonata for two violins in C, Op. 56 (1932)
- Marta Ptaszynska: Mancala (1997)
- Gaetano Pugnani: Six Sonatas for Two Violins, Op. 5
- Osmo Tapio Räihälä: Rampant (1997)
- Tomi Räisänen:
  - Midsommar(so)natten (2010/2014)
  - No-Go (2011/2016)
  - Kiseki-no-ippon-matsu (2020)
- Behzad Ranjbaran: Six Caprices for Violin Duo (1988)
- Alan Rawsthorne: Theme and Variations (1937/38)
- Max Reger: Drei Canons und Fugen im alten Stil, Op. 131b (1914)
- Kaija Saariaho: Danse des flocons, I and II (2002)
- Giacinto Scelsi: Arc-en-ciel (1973)
- Alfred Schnittke: Prelude in Memoriam Dmitri Shostakovich (1975)
- Franz Schubert: 4 komische Ländler, D 354 (1816)
- Ferenc Sebök: 6 duos for violins, Op. 6
  - Miroirs de styles, 24 duos for violins, Op. 4, 5, 8, 20
- Johanna Senfter: 10 Alte Tänze, Op. 91
- Joseph Sonnabend: Synergism (2020)
- Louis Spohr:
  - 3 Concertant Duos, Op. 3
  - 2 Concertant Duos, Op. 9
  - 3 Grand Duos, Op. 39
  - 3 Concertant Duos, Op. 67
  - Grand Duo, Op. 148 (1856)
  - Duo, Op. 150 (1856)
  - Duo, Op. 153 (1856)
- Anton Stamitz:
  - 6 Violin Duos, Op.8
  - 6 Violin Duos, Op.9
- Carl Stamitz: 6 Duos for 2 flutes or violins, Op.27
- Toru Takemitsu: Rocking Mirror Daybreak (1983)
- Georg Philipp Telemann:
  - 6 Sonates sans Basse for two traversos, violins or recorders, TWV 40:101-106 (1728-29)
  - Gulliver's Travels, Intrada-Suite, TWV 40:108 (1728-29)
  - 18 Canons Mélodieux for two traversos, violins or viola da gambas, TWV 40:118-123 (1738)
  - Second Livre de Duo, 6 Sonatas for two violins, flutes or oboes, TWV 40:124-129 (1752)
- Mikis Theodorakis:
  - Études (1945)
  - Duetto (1946)
  - Winternacht (2005)
- David Toub: khurbn (2025)
- Giovanni Battista Viotti:
  - 6 Violin Duos, Op. 5 (1797-98)
  - 3 Violin Duos, Op. 18 (1803)
  - 6 Duo Serenatas, Op. 23 (1804)
  - 6 Violin Duos, WIV:1-6 (1789)
  - 6 Concertant Duos, WIV:7-12 (1789-90)
  - 6 Easy Duos, WIV:13-18 (1796)
  - 3 Violin Duos, WIV:28-30 (1803)
- Antonín Vranický:
  - Variations, Op. 7 (1807)
  - Duos, Op. 9 (1804)
  - Three Duos, Op. 20
  - Twenty variations (1791)
- Johann Baptist Wanhal
  - 16 Violin Duets, Op.17
  - 6 Violin Duets, Op.28
  - 24 Violin Duets, Op.56
- Mieczysław Weinberg: Sonata, Op. 69 (1959)
- Henryk Wieniawski: Études-Caprices, Op. 18 (1862)
- Christian Wolff: Duo for violins (1950)
- Eugène Ysaÿe: Duo Sonata (1915)
- Isang Yun:
  - Sonatina (1983)
  - Pezzo fantasioso per due instrumenti con basso ad libitum (1988)
- John Zorn: Apophthegms (2012)

== Two violins and orchestra ==
- Malcolm Arnold: Concerto for 2 Violins and String Orchestra, Op. 77
- Johann Sebastian Bach: Concerto for 2 Violins in D minor, BWV 1043
- P. D. Q. Bach: Konzertstück for Two Violins with Orchestra, S. 2+ †
- Anna Clyne: Prince of Clouds for two violins and string orchestra (2012)
- Gerd Domhardt: Concerto for 2 violins and orchestra in one movement (1979)
- Rob du Bois: Concerto for 2 violins and orchestra (1979)
- Lukas Foss: Orpheus and Euridice for 2 violins, chamber orchestra and tape (1983); 2nd version of Orpheus (1972)
- Géza Frid:
  - Concerto for 2 violins and orchestra, Op. 40
  - Concerto for Three violins and orchestra, Op. 78
- Philip Glass: Echorus for 2 violins and string orchestra (1995, version of the Etude No. 2 for piano)
- Gustav Holst: Double Concerto for 2 violins and orchestra, Op. 49
- Bohuslav Martinů:
  - Duo Concertante (Concerto No. 1) for 2 violins and orchestra, H. 264
  - Concerto No. 2 in D major for 2 violins and orchestra, H. 329
- Karl Marx: Concerto for 2 violins and orchestra
- Wolfgang Amadeus Mozart: Concertone in C major for 2 violins and orchestra, K. 190
- Mark O'Connor: Double Violin Concerto for 2 violins and symphony orchestra
- Arvo Pärt: Tabula Rasa for 2 violins, prepared piano and string orchestra
- Marta Ptaszynska: Concerto Grosso for 2 violins and chamber orchestra (1996.)
- Steve Reich: Duet for 2 Violins and string ensemble (1994)
- Osmo Tapio Räihälä: A Sensuous Encounter in the Eastern Garden, for two solo violins and orchestra (2023)
- Pablo de Sarasate: Navarra, Duo in A major for 2 violins and orchestra (or piano), Op. 33 (1889.)
- Johanna Senfter: Concerto for 2 violins and string orchestra, Op. 40
- Obadiah Shuttleworth: 2 concerti grossi, for two solo violins and string orchestra, arranged from the opus 5 solo sonatas by Arcangelo Corelli (1653–1713)
- Nikos Skalkottas: Concerto for 2 violins (1944–5) (not orchestrated)
- Antonio Vivaldi: Concerto for 2 violins in A minor, RV522
- Eugène Ysaÿe: Amitié, poem for 2 violins and orchestra, Op. 26

== Two violins and piano ==
- Norman Fraser: Cueca for 2 Violins and Piano
- Géza Frid: Separate Ways, Op. 75a
- Vagn Holmboe: Isomeric, Duo Concertante, Op. 51 (1950)
- Darius Milhaud: Sonata for Two Violins and Piano, Op. 15
- Dmitri Shostakovich: Five pieces for 2 Violins and Piano
- Moritz Moszkowski: Suite, Op. 71
- Christian Sinding:
  - Serenade, Op. 56/1
  - Serenade, Op. 92/2
- Ladislav Gabrielli: Three trios for two violins and piano
