= The Seamstress =

The Seamstress may refer to:

- The Seamstress (Clyne), a 2014 violin concerto by composer Anna Clyne
- The Seamstress (1936 film), a Czech film
- The Seamstress (2009 film), a Canadian film
- The Seamstress (painting), an 1893 oil painting by Édouard Vuillard
- The seamstress (A Tale of Two Cities), a fictional character in Charles Dickens's A Tale of Two Cities
