= Rift (ballet) =

2016 ballet by Anna Clyne and Kitty McNamee

Rift (stylized as RIFT) is a ballet in three acts written in 2016 by the composer Anna Clyne and choreographed by Kitty McNamee. The work was commissioned by the Cabrillo Festival of Contemporary Music and was given its world premiere by the Cabrillo Festival of Contemporary Music Orchestra under the direction of Marin Alsop at the Santa Cruz Civic Auditorium on August 5, 2016.

== Composition ==
Rift has a duration of roughly 25 minutes and is cast in three acts played without pause:

1. "dust"
2. "water"
3. "space"

In the score program note, Clyne wrote that the piece was conceived to "reflect upon the chaos and destruction that is so prevalent in the world today."

=== Instrumentation ===
The work is scored for a large orchestra consisting of two flutes, piccolo, two oboes, Cor anglais, two clarinets, bass clarinet, two bassoons, contrabassoon, four horns, three trumpets, two trombones, bass trombone, tuba, timpani, three percussionists, harp, piano, and strings.

== Reception ==
Rift has been generally praised by music critics. Anne Midgette of The Washington Post described it as "a wonderful 20-minute piece [...], which murmured and pulsed lyrically and earthly, sounding like something you've always known but forgotten." David Nice of The Arts Desk wrote that it "served up a surprise: memorable melody, starting with the viola tune which goes on to be variously harmonized and scored, some of the tunes bravely verging on the banal in the manner of the underrated symphonies of Malcolm Arnold." He added, "I'd expected this to be a piece about process, allegedly taking us from 'dust' via purifying 'water' to 'space', and hadn't expected the 'hooks' so few contemporary composers bother to provide along the way. In fact the trajectory was hard to make out, despite the non-irritant stage and hall lighting, but the procession of brilliant ideas and quick contrasts, nothing outstaying its welcome, presumably rooted in Clyne's brief to write ballet music in her collaboration with choreographer Kitty McNamee, more than made up for that."

Scott Cantrell of The Dallas Morning News compared the music to that of Ralph Vaughan Williams, despite more lukewarmly observing, "At least on first hearing, I had no clear sense of the 'Dust,' 'Water' and 'Space' subtitles–or, for that matter, much in the way of formal organization. One thing seems to happen, then something different, then something else different. Maybe that's the point."
