= Masquerade (Clyne) =

Orchestral composition by Anna Clyne

Masquerade is a single-movement orchestral composition by the British-born composer Anna Clyne. The work was commissioned by the BBC and it was first performed on 7 September 2013 at the Last Night of the Proms by the BBC Symphony Orchestra under conductor Marin Alsop. Clyne dedicated the piece to the Proms' concertgoers colloquially known as the "Prommers".

== Composition ==
Masquerade is composed in a single movement and has a duration of roughly 5 minutes. The piece is inspired by 18th-century promenade concerts held in London's pleasure garden. Clyne wrote of this inspiration in the score program notes:

As is true today, these concerts were a place where people from all walks of life mingled to enjoy a wide array of music. Other forms of entertainment ranged from the sedate to the salacious with acrobatics, exotic street entertainers, dancers, fireworks and masquerades. I am fascinated by the historic and sociological courtship between music and dance. Combined with costumes, masked guises and elaborate settings, masquerades created an exciting, yet controlled, sense of occasion and celebration. It is this that I wish to evoke in Masquerade.

The music quotes the melody from the traditional English drinking song "The Juice of the Barley."

=== Instrumentation ===
The work is scored for an orchestra comprising two flutes, piccolo, two oboes, cor anglais, two clarinets, bass clarinet, two bassoons, contrabassoon, four horns, three trumpets, two trombones, bass trombone, tuba, timpani, three percussionists, harp, and strings.

== Reception ==
Reviewing the world premiere, Fiona Maddocks of The Guardian called Masquerade a "short, glistening" piece. Also writing for The Guardian, the music critic Martin Kettle called the piece "an appealingly exuberant curtain-raiser." Ivan Hewett of was more critical, however, writing, "The opening piece, Anna Clyne's opening piece Masquerade, had a cinematic brio which to my ears was more redolent of piracy on the high seas than Vauxhall Pleasure Gardens (which apparently was what it was meant to evoke)."
