= Jody Elff =

Jody Elff (born February 18, 1970, in America) is an American audio engineer, sound artist and designer. In 2016, he received a Grammy Award for his work on Sing Me Home, under the category of "Best World Music Album".

== Early life and education ==
Elff grew up in Freehold, New Jersey, with parents George and Vera Elff. George was an electrician, and Vera was a former hairdresser and full-time mother.

Elff displayed an interest in music from a very early age, and throughout his education studied instruments including the guitar, saxophone, piano and voice. During High School, Elff became interested in the intersection of music making and technology, experimenting with synthesizers of the era and multi-track recordings.

Elff studied music at the Berklee College of Music in Boston, MA, graduating in 1991 with a Bachelor of Music degree specializing in Music Synthesis, focusing on sound design, MIDI systems and early computer audio editing software.

== Career ==
While at the Berklee College of Music, Elff became affiliated with several regional sound system vendors; he worked after class, and on weekends, providing tech support for shows around the Boston area, which led to his first international touring opportunity immediately after graduating in 1991.

After graduating, Elff worked with several New York based productions companies and has provided sound support for events at Radio City Music Hall, Madison Square Garden, and many other venues. Elff also provided mixing and technical support for several early MTV productions.

Throughout the 1990s, Elff continued to tour in the US and internationally with various artists including New York Voices, Diana Krall, Hothouse Flowers, and others. In 1999 Jody began a decade-long association with Laurie Anderson, starting with her "Songs and Stories from Moby Dick" project, and over the next 10 years included numerous tours, installation and recording projects.

Elff's work has expanded to include a diverse range of projects, from live concert audio to film composition, opera and theatrical sound design, field recordings, studio recording projects, fine-art installations and technical innovation. Primarily music-driven, his work spans all genres.

Elff has recorded and mixed dozens of albums, including the 2017 Grammy award-winning "Sing Me Home" by Yo-Yo Ma and the Silk Road Ensemble. His fine art sound installations have been presented internationally, including the permanent installation "STRATA" in Lyon, France.

In collaboration with the composer Anna Clyne, Elff has developed The Augmented Orchestra (AO), which involves audio processing integrated with live orchestral performances, thereby expanding the sound of an acoustic orchestra in real time.

During the COVID-19 pandemic in 2020, Elff began exploring a long-simmering idea about how to mix high channel-count audio in real time over distance, resulting in a patented methodology to do so. This inspired the formation of a new company, Harris Elff Audio Resources (HEAR) with long-time friends and colleagues John Harris and Robert Macomber. HEAR now stands as an industry leader for live audio recording and broadcast in North America.

== Projects ==
=== Music ===
==== Contemporary Classical ====
- Bang on a Can
- Brooklyn Rider
- Heiner Goebbels
- ICE (International Contemporary Ensemble)
- Lincoln Center
- Los Angeles Philharmonic
- Mostly Mozart
- The Knights
- Yo-Yo Ma

==== Jazz ====
- Fred Hersch
- New York Voices

==== Pop Music ====
- Hall & Oats
- Smokey Robinson

==== World Music ====
- Steve Gorn
- Paul Winter
- Kayhan Kalhor
- Silk Road Ensemble

=== Art ===
- Laurie Anderson
- Cartier Foundation
- Diller & Scofidio and Renfro
- Lyon Installation
- Natural History Museum
- Target / TED
- Turner Networks
- Stephen Vitiello

=== Corporate ===
- ABC / Disney
- Michelle Obama's Becoming Book Tour
- Oprah Winfrey Your Path Made Clear Tour
- Oprah Winfrey Vision 2020 Tour
- Target / TED
- Turner Networks

=== Artists ===
- Laurie Anderson
- Anna Clyne
- Fred Hersch
- Heiner Goebbels
- Osvaldo Golijov
- Mette Henriette
- Kayhan Kalhor
- David Lang
- Yo-Yo Ma
- Meredith Monk
- Yuval Sharon
- Paul Winter
- Nicholas Cords
- Osvaldo Golijov

=== Opera ===
- The Blind - Lera Auerbach
- Europeras - John Cage
- Los Angeles Philharmonic
- Mile Long Opera - David Lang
- Place - Ted Hearne
- Sweetland - Yuval Sharon
- War of the Worlds - Annie Gosfield
- The Industry – Sweet Land

=== Theater ===
- Heiner Goebbels
- National Theater of the United States of America
- Sweetland - Yuval Sharon

=== Recordings ===
- Laurie Anderson - Live at Town Hall
- Brooklyn Rider - Passport, Silent City, Dominant Curve
- Anna Clyne - The Violin, Masquerade, Shorthand
- Osvaldo Golijov - Falling Out of Time
- Fred Hersch - My Coma Dreams
- The Knights - New Worlds
- Huun Huur Tu - Ancestor's Call
- Nathan Davis - Hagoromo
- Nicholas Cords - Recursions
- Silk Road Ensemble - Sing Me Home, Playlist for an Extreme Occasion. Off The Map

=== Affiliations ===
Professional Affiliations include

- Firehouse Productions
- SHURE Microphones
- Sennheiser
- DPA
- Meyer Sound
