= Abstractions (composition) =

Orchestral suite by Anna Clyne

Abstractions is an orchestral suite by the British-American composer Anna Clyne. The work was commissioned in honor of the Baltimore philanthropists Robert E. Meyerhoff and Rheda Becker by the Baltimore Symphony Orchestra, for whom Clyne is composer-in-residence. Its world premiere was given by the Baltimore Symphony Orchestra under the direction of Marin Alsop in Strathmore, Maryland, on May 7, 2016. The suite's five movements were each inspired by eponymous pieces of artwork from the Baltimore Museum of Art.

== Composition ==
=== Structure ===
Abstractions has a duration of roughly 20 minutes and is cast in five movements:

1. "Marble Moon" – inspired by Sara VanDerBeek's Marble Moon (2015)
2. "Auguries" – inspired by Julie Mehretu's Auguries (2010)
3. "Seascape" – inspired by Hiroshi Sugimoto's Caribbean Sea, Jamaica (1980)
4. "River" – inspired by Ellsworth Kelly's River II (2005)
5. "Three" – inspired by Brice Marden's 3 (1987–88)

=== Instrumentation ===
The work is scored for a large orchestra consisting of a piccolo, two flutes, two oboes, cor anglais, two clarinets, bass clarinet, two bassoons, contrabassoon, four horns, three trumpets, two trombones, bass trombone, tuba, timpani, three percussionists, harp, piano, and strings.

== Reception ==
Abstractions has been praised by music critics. Reviewing the world premiere, Tim Smith of The Baltimore Sun wrote, "Knowing the images helps bring the music into focus, but the five-movement work easily stands on its own, thanks to the clarity and expressive nuance of Clyne's writing." He added, "Each movement is rich in ideas and instrumental shades; except for the finale, which could use a more convincing coda, each makes a fully rounded statement." Robert Battey of The Washington Post similarly observed, "Abstractions [...] veers between controlled chaos (rapid figurations in the strings cascading over one another frantically) and icy stillness (the first section, 'Marble Moon,' has a single pedal point in the double basses throughout). The swooping arpeggios of the closing section, 'Three,' give the work a giddy, exhilarating send-off."
