= Spangled Unicorn =

Spangled Unicorn is a composition for brass ensemble by the British-born composer Anna Clyne. The work was commissioned by the Chicago Symphony Orchestra, for which Clyne was then composer-in-residence. It was first performed on March 21, 2011, at Symphony Center, Chicago by the brass section of the Chicago Symphony Orchestra.

== Composition ==
Clyne was inspired to write the piece by the "powerhouse" brass section of the Chicago Symphony Orchestra. She later described the experience as "an opportunity to take a stab at writing for such an ensemble for the first time."

The title of the work comes from the book Spangled Unicorn by Noël Coward, which Clyne spotted while shopping at a Chicago bookstore. Clyne wrote in the score program notes, "I scooped it up, but alas, none of the poems made even the slightest of references to a unicorn of a spangly nature. So, I instead turned to the young writers Helena McBurney (age 11) and Charlotte McBurney (age 9) who created their very own stories about this magical beast. I then spliced their two stories and reassembled them to form one story..." A tape of the girls reading this story can be played as an optional accompaniment to the piece.

=== Instrumentation ===
The work is scored for a brass ensemble consisting of three horns, three trumpets, three trombones, and a tuba.

== Reception ==
Reviewing the world premiere, Lawrence A. Johnson of the Chicago Classical Voice called the piece "well-crafted, virtuosic and written with great flair and a quirky off-center humor". He added:

Typical of Clyne's music, Spangled Unicorn packs a lot into just 11 minutes. After a fanfare opening, the work segues into a swaying waltz led by CSO trumpeters Chris Martin and John Hagstrom. The music accelerates and becomes more hectic and driven with increasingly brilliant writing for trumpets set against horns and trombones. An ironic Mahler-esque dance-like theme is heard followed by some wail-like trombone cries (protests form Coward's nonexistent unicorn?). That leads to a brief nocturnal passage for horns and another hard-driving virtuosic section with sudden full stops. The music closes with a rather low-key coda with dragging, repeated chords for trombone and tuba, like Fafner emerging from his lair.

Conversely, Evan Kuchar of ChicagoNow called Spangled Unicorn "a big disappointment" and described it as "banal ideas combined in boring ways—and then brought back a second time. There's some fanfare, a waltz that hangs around for too long, and there's even a polka that sounded like one of Brahms' Hungarian Dances. Not unicorny at all; just corny. And nothing dreamy about it."
