= This Midnight Hour =

Orchestral composition by Anna Clyne

This Midnight Hour is an orchestral composition by the British composer Anna Clyne. The work was co-commissioned by the Orchestre national d'Île-de-France, for which Clyne was then composer-in-residence, and the Seattle Symphony. It was first performed by the Orchestre national d'Île-de-France conducted by Enrique Mazzola at the Théâtre Espace Coluche, Plaisir, on 13 November 2015.

== Composition ==
This Midnight Hour is cast in a single movement and has a performance duration of approximately 12 minutes. The music was inspired by two poems: "La Musica" by Juan Ramón Jiménez and "Harmonie du soir" by Charles Baudelaire. Nevertheless, Clyne commented in the score program note, "Whilst it is not intended to depict a specific narrative, my intention is that it will evoke a visual journey for the listener."

=== Instrumentation ===
The work is scored for a large orchestra consisting of two flutes, piccolo, two oboes, two clarinets, two bassoons, four horns, two trumpets, two trombones, bass trombone, tuba, timpani, two percussionists, and strings.

== Reception ==
Reviewing a performance by the BBC Philharmonic, Robert Beale of The Arts Desk described This Midnight Hour as "accessible music, with recognisable chords, repetition of coherent units within its themes, reprises of some important sections, and the instrumentational ability to make even a straight unison sound thrilling." He added, "It's also at times quite filmic in style, with a big tune in string octaves, folksy woodwind solos, and a slow, sentimental role for two trumpets, either side of the stage, with very traditional harmonies to accompany them. It’s also got some effective brass and woodwind chorus writing, which Ben Gernon balanced with skill." Reviewing a performance by the St. Louis Symphony Orchestra, Sarah Bryan Miller of the St. Louis Post-Dispatch wrote, "It opens with the low strings of the large orchestra giving the effect of someone running steadily in darkness, and builds on that in stormy music. There are lyrical moments, taking turns with the running motif, and a hymn-like melody to conclude. Clyne packs a lot of emotions into its 12-minute length." Reviewing that same performance, Chuck Lavazzi of KDHX wrote that the "chase" music soon changes into "a tipsy dance that requires the strings to use some unorthodox techniques (e.g., some players using no vibrato, others playing slightly out of tune) to imitate the sound of an accordion. The accordion fights it out with the 'chase' music before finally lapsing into a sweetly nostalgic melody that almost sounds like something Edith Piaf would have sung. A final bang from the bass drum brings everything to an abrupt finish. It's an engaging piece that demonstrates that newer music need not sound like a mathematical exercise."

Scott Cantrell of The Dallas Morning News was more critical of the piece, however, remarking, "Fourteen minutes long, it's certainly a loose-strung stream of consciousness. Restless scrambles from lower strings evoke the opening of Wagner's Die Walküre, then various chatters and dithers work their way through the orchestra." He added, "Dark treadings, downward slithers and suggestions of wild animal calls ensue. More tempests subside to make room for big cinematic effusions that seem oddly out of place, as do subsequent folksongish episodes. At least on first hearing, whatever logic there may be to the piece eluded me."
