= Robert Newman (impresario) =

British impresario

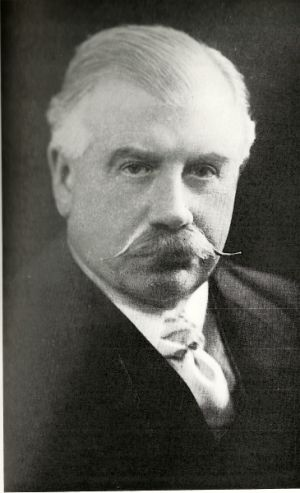
Newman in 1906

Robert Newman (1858 – 4 November 1926) was an English businessman and musical impresario. He is most celebrated as the founder of the series of classical music concerts that are now known as The Proms.

Born in 1858 into a wealthy family, Newman had an initial career as stockjobber in the City of London. He also studied singing in Italy, and sang bass, which included participation in the first performance of Hubert Parry's oratorio Job. He became a concert agent and gained initial experience organising orchestral concerts with Frederic Hymen Cowen at Covent Garden.

In 1893, Newman became the first manager of the Queen's Hall. He had the idea for a series of concerts at the Queen's Hall, at affordable prices for a mass audience, with a proportion of the audience able to promenade in a designated space without seats. Newman hired Henry Wood as the conductor for these "promenade concerts", and summarised his idea to Wood:

"I am going to run nightly concerts and train the public by easy stages. Popular at first, gradually raising the standard until I have created a public for classical and modern music".

Wood mentioned Newman's idea to the otolaryngologist Dr George Cathcart, who met with Newman and offered financial backing to Newman's concert series venture. The first "Promenade Concert" took place on Saturday 10 August 1895, with Henry Wood conducting his new "Queen's Hall Orchestra". This first season of concerts ran ten weeks, and was initially called "Mr Robert Newman's Promenade Concerts". To keep concerts affordable, Newman set his ticket prices at 1s for a single promenade concert ticket, and 1 guinea for a season ticket, transferable among more than one person, and valid for all that season's concerts. Newman and Wood included regular concerts within the series of "Wagner Nights" (Mondays) and "Beethoven Nights" (Fridays), and gradually began to introduce new works, or "novelties", by the composers of the day to promenade concerts audiences.

Although the concerts gained a popular following and reputation, Newman encountered considerable financial problems in the management of his Promenade Concerts, and went bankrupt in 1901-1902. Edgar Speyer, a banker, then took over the financing of the concerts, but Newman and Wood retained artistic control. During World War I, Speyer had to relinquish his participation with the series because of anti-German sentiment. In 1915, the publishing firm Chappell & Co. took over the lease of the Queen's Hall as well as financial control. Although management tensions developed between Chappell & Co. and Newman and Wood, Newman remained involved with the running of his Promenade Concerts until his sudden death in 1926.

After Newman's death, a small memorial plaque was placed behind his second circle regular seat in the Queen's Hall. Having resisted an offer by the BBC to broadcast the promenade concerts from the Queen's Hall before Newman's death, Chappell & Co. consented to such broadcasts after Newman's death. In addition, the BBC eventually took over the management and financial control of the Newman Promenade Concerts. The Newman Promenade Concerts were renamed "The Henry Wood Promenade Concerts", as Wood continued his involvement in the artistic direction of the series until his death in 1944.

In 1941, the Queen's Hall was destroyed in an air raid and the memorial plaque to Newman was lost. His series continues today, and is now formally called "The Henry Wood Promenade Concerts presented by the BBC", known popularly as "The Proms".

== Sources ==
- The Henry Wood Proms, by David Cox ISBN 0-563-17697-0
- Spiegel, Frances, "Promenade Concerts before 1950: Robert Newman, Sir Henry Wood and the BBC Proms". Theatre History web page, 10 July 2007.
