= Inbal Segev =

Israeli musician

- ענבל שגב
- Born: Israel
- Education: Juilliard School, Yale School of Music
- Occupation: Cellist
- Notable work: "Dance" (cello concerto by Anna Clyne)
- Children: 3

Inbal Segev (Hebrew: ענבל שגב) is a cellist who grew up in Israel. Segev began her studies in Israel at the age of 5. With the recommendation of Isaac Stern, she came to the United States to continue her studies at the age of 16. She debuted with the Israel Philharmonic and the Berlin Philharmonic under the direction of Zubin Mehta. Her Carnegie Hall debut was held on December 7, 1997, where she performed the Carnegie Hall premiere of Trois strophes sur le nom de Sacher for solo cello by Henri Dutilleux.

Segev won prizes at the International Pablo Casals Cello Competition in Kronberg (2000), The Juilliard Concerto competition (1998), the International Paulo Cello Competition in Helsinki (1996), and the Washington International Competition (1995).

Segev has released a number of recordings, including Nigun on Vox Records and Dance, a five movement cello concerto by Anna Clyne which was commissioned by Segev in 2019.

Segev holds a bachelor's degree from the Juilliard School and a master's degree from the Yale School of Music, where her teachers included Joel Krosnick, Harvey Shapiro and Aldo Parisot. She also studied with Bernard Greenhouse, who was a student of Pablo Casals. Segev's cello was made by Francesco Rugeri in 1673.

Segev resides in New York with her husband and 3 children.
