= The Seamstress (Clyne) =

2015 concerto by composer Anna Clyne

The Seamstress is a concerto for solo violin and orchestra by the British-born composer Anna Clyne. The work was commissioned by the Chicago Symphony Orchestra, for which Clyne was then composer-in-residence. It was first performed May 28, 2015, at Symphony Center, Chicago by the violinist Jennifer Koh and the Chicago Symphony Orchestra under conductor Ludovic Morlot. The Seamstress marks the second collaboration between Clyne and Koh, who had previously premiered Clyne's double violin concerto Prince of Clouds in November 2012.

== Composition ==
The Seamstress has a duration of roughly 25 minutes and is composed in one continuous movement. Clyne described her inspiration for the piece in the score program notes, writing:

The Seamstress is an imaginary one-act ballet. Alone on the stage, the seamstress is seated, unraveling threads from an antique cloth laid gently over her lap. Lost in her thoughts, her mind begins to meander and her imagination spirals into a series of five tales that range from love to despair, and that combine memory with fantasy.

The title of the piece comes from the William Butler Yeats poem "A Coat".

=== Instrumentation ===
The work is scored for solo violin and an orchestra comprising two flutes, piccolo, two oboes, cor anglais, two clarinets, bass clarinet, two bassoons, contrabassoon, four horns, three trumpets, two trombones, tuba, timpani, three percussionists, a laptop, harp, and strings.

== Reception ==
The Seamstress was met with a mixed response from critics. Reviewing the world premiere, John von Rhein of the Chicago Tribune said the piece "turned out to be less of an event than one had expected" and wrote:

Despite the meticulous sense of craft that is the composer's hallmark, and despite the extraordinary poise, assurance and sensitivity Koh brought to the continuously unfolding solo part, the musical content ultimately proved too thin to sustain interest on its own. As for the electronic embroidery, the mostly unintelligible speech and piercing yawps of synthesized sound (like bursts of feedback) added little but aural irritation to the work and could easily have been dispensed with.

Lawrence A. Johnson of the Chicago Classical Review similarly criticized the "ill-judged electronic component" and a "rather anticlimactic" coda, but nevertheless added:

The Seamstress has some lovely moments and is an engaging work in Clyne's best affecting vein. As with many of the composer’s efforts, The Seamstress would seem to be a much stronger and more effective piece in an unplugged version minus the electronics, which feel unnecessary and grafted on. Perhaps future revisions will show this appealing music in a more consistently positive light.
