= Dance (Clyne) =

Dance for cello and orchestra (stylized as DANCE) is a cello concerto written by the British composer Anna Clyne. The work was composed in 2019 on a commission from the Israeli cellist Inbal Segev. Its world premiere was performed at the Cabrillo Festival of Contemporary Music by Segev and the Cabrillo Festival Orchestra conducted by Cristian Măcelaru at the Santa Cruz Civic Auditorium on 3 August 2019. The piece is dedicated to the composer's father, Leslie Clyne.

== Composition ==
Dance has a duration of roughly 25 minutes and is cast in five movements. The piece is named for a five-line poem by the 13th-century poet Rumi; each of the five movements is thus named for a line from the poem:

1. "when you're broken open"
2. "if you've torn the bandage off"
3. "in the middle of the fighting"
4. "in your blood"
5. "when you're perfectly free"

=== Instrumentation ===
The concerto is scored for solo cello and an orchestra comprising two flutes (2nd doubling piccolo), two oboes (2nd doubling Cor anglais), two clarinets (2nd doubling bass clarinet), bassoon, contrabassoon, two horns, two trumpets, trombone, tuba, timpani, two percussionists, and strings.

== Reception ==
Dance has been highly praised by music critics. Andrew Clements of The Guardian described the piece as a "hugely impressive new cello concerto," adding, "There are moments in the first movement [...] which recall John Tavener's The Protecting Veil, as consoling, modal string chords underpin the soaring cello line, just as the rough motoric energy of the opening of the second movement [...] seems to feed off the 'industrial' minimalism of Clyne's teacher, the Bang on a Can co-founder Julia Wolfe. But none of it seems derivative and the concerto as a whole is utterly personal, blending musical materials in a way that is entirely Clyne's own. Sometimes she borrows from folk music – she particularly singles out Jewish and Irish echoes in her melodic writing – and sometimes from classical models, especially baroque, but the fusion is always gorgeously rich and compelling." Christopher Arnott of the Hartford Courant called the piece "astounding" and wrote, "Its power comes from reverberation, not volume. Clyne writes orchestral works that ask musicians to echo, with living, breathing human warmth, what electronic and synthesized instruments can do in modern recordings. The cello is the superstar of Dance, but there are extraordinary bumps and clicks and theremin-like squeaks added by the vibraphonist and a crucial core hum emanating from the violins. Over this bedrock of strangely soothing vibrations is a tour-de-force cello solo that changes its character completely for each movement." He conclude, "There's so much going on in it, you want to hear it again as soon as it's over." Tom Huizenga of NPR similarly described the piece as "perhaps her most ambitious and appealing work so far," writing:

It's hard to resist the gorgeous opening of DANCE, her new cello concerto performed with singular commitment by cellist Inbal Segev and conductor Marin Alsop. In music that evokes calm and open spaces, Segev floats long-lined melodies above warm, slowly shifting strings and tinted winds, reaching for her instrument's highest notes. It's a tender and wistful way into the five-movement work. What follows are sections, individual in their personalities, ranging from feisty and chaotic to loving and joyful. Clyne's orchestrations are keenly attentive to color and light, and she's fearless in filling the concerto with melodies of undisguised beauty. Some are folkish, others are regal. All linger in the ear, begging to be heard again.
