= Night Ferry (composition) =

2012 orchestral composition by Anna Clyne

Night Ferry is an orchestral composition in one movement by the British-born composer Anna Clyne. The work was commissioned by the Chicago Symphony Orchestra, for which Clyne was then composer-in-residence. It was first performed February 9, 2012, at Symphony Center, Chicago by the Chicago Symphony Orchestra under conductor Riccardo Muti. A live performance by the BBC Symphony Orchestra conducted by Andrew Litton was recorded at the Barbican Hall in January 2013 and issued along with four other Clyne works in 2020.

== Composition ==
Night Ferry has a duration of roughly 20 minutes and is composed in a single movement. The work was Clyne's second commission from the Chicago Symphony as composer-in-residence and her second fully orchestral composition.

=== Inspiration ===
At the behest of a suggestion from conductor Riccardo Muti, Clyne looked for inspiration from the composer Franz Schubert who suffered from a type of mood disorder known as cyclothymia. Clyne described this disorder and its inspiration for Night Ferry in the score program notes, writing:

This illness sometimes manifests in rapid shifts between the two states and also in periods of mixed states whereby symptoms of both extremes are present. This illness shadowed Schubert throughout his adulthood, and it impacted and inspired his art dramatically. His friends report that in its most troublesome form, he suffered periods of "dark despair and violent anger". Schubert asserted that whenever he wrote songs of love, he wrote songs of pain, and whenever he wrote songs of pain, he wrote songs of love. Extremes were an organic part of his make-up.

She added, "In its essence, Night Ferry is a sonic portrait of voyages; voyages within nature and of physical, mental and emotional states." Additionally, the title of the piece is from the Irish poet Seamus Heaney's Elegy for the author Robert Lowell, who also suffered from manic depression.

While composing the work, Clyne simultaneously painted a series of seven large canvasses for cross-inspiration. She later wrote:

This became my visual timeline for the duration of the music. In correlation to composing the music, I painted from left to right, moving forward through time. I painted a section then composed a section, and vice versa, intertwining the two in the creative process. The process of unraveling the music visually helped to spark ideas for musical motifs, development, orchestration, and, in particular, structure. Similarly, the music would also give direction to color, texture and form. Upon the canvas I layered paint, charcoal, pencil, pen, ribbon, gauze, snippets of text from Coleridge's The Rime of the Ancient Mariner, fragments of Gustave Doré's illustrations for this wonderfully evocative poem, and a selection of quotes from artists afflicted with, and blessed by, this fascinating illness.

=== Instrumentation ===
The work is scored for an orchestra comprising two flutes, piccolo, two oboes, cor anglais, two clarinets one in eb, bass clarinet, two bassoons, contrabassoon, four horns, three trumpets, three trombones, tuba, timpani, three percussionists, harp, piano, and strings.

== Reception ==
Reviewing the world premiere, Lawrence A. Johnson of The Classical Review called Night Ferry "a powerful, compelling work displaying the freshness and individuality of the greatly gifted Clyne" and wrote, "...this is an undeniably impressive debut for the 31-year-old composer, especially considering this is only her second work for orchestra." Although somewhat disappointed by the premiere, John von Rhein of the Chicago Tribune later remarked that the piece had grown on him. In 2014, he wrote, "The score's roiling strings, jabbing brass and delicate Tibetan singing bowls now come together with an expressive impact I didn't feel at the premiere."
