= BBC Proms =

Annual classical music concerts in London

- Current BBC Proms logo, used from the 2022 Proms season

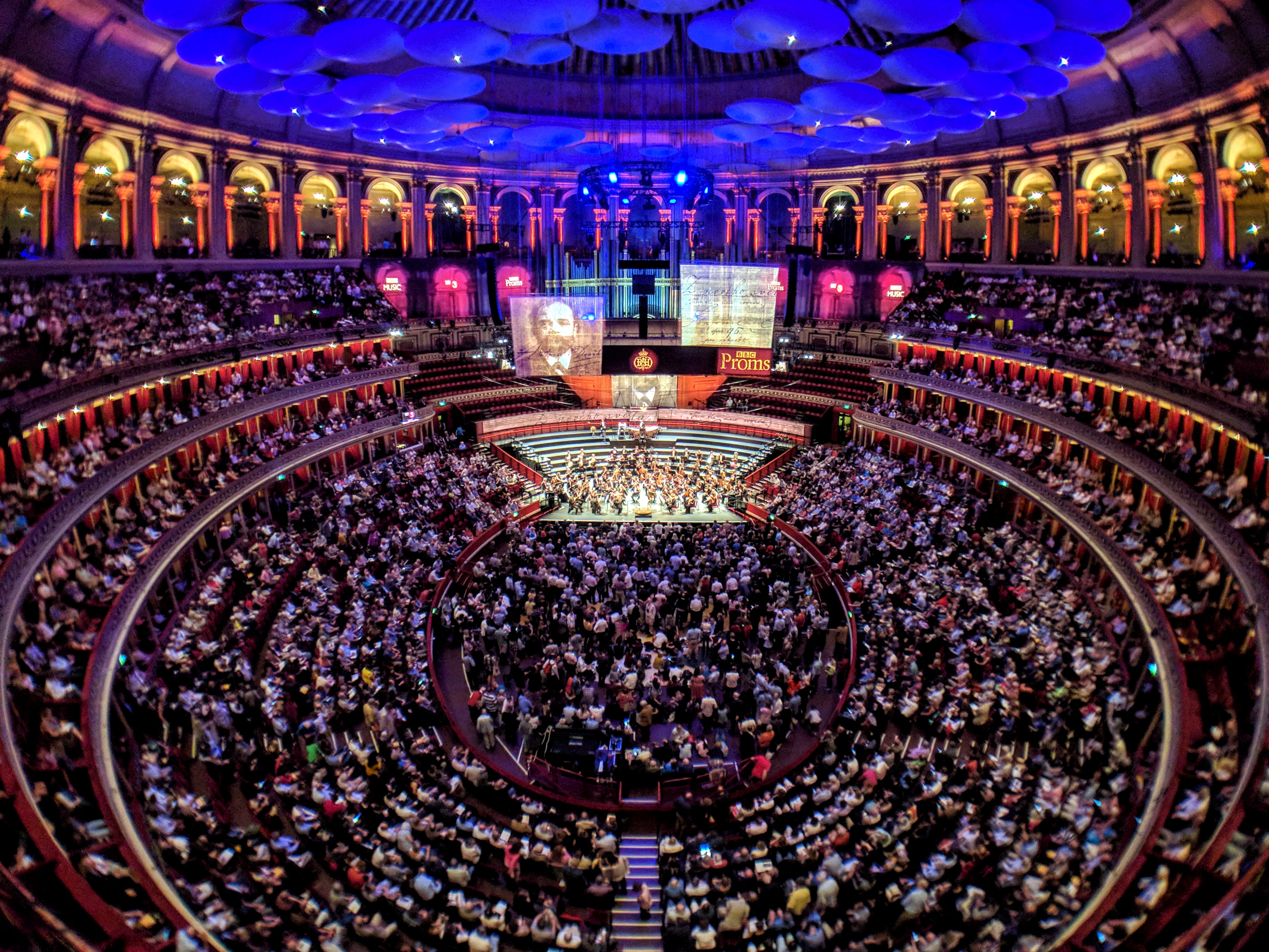
- The audience in the Royal Albert Hall during the 2017 BBC Proms
- Nickname: The Henry Wood Promenade Concerts
- Status: Active
- Genre: Classical; jazz; funk; world
- Begins: July
- Ends: September
- Frequency: Annually
- Venue: Royal Albert Hall, Cadogan Hall and other venues around the UK
- Coordinates: 51.501111°N 0.1775°W
- Country: United Kingdom
- Years active: 131
- Founded: 10 August 1895
- Founders: Robert Newman; Henry Wood
- Organiser: BBC
- Website: www.bbc.co.uk/proms

The BBC Proms is an eight-week summer season of daily orchestral classical music concerts and other events held annually, predominantly in the Royal Albert Hall in central London.

The season is a significant event in British culture and in classical music. Czech conductor Jiří Bělohlávek described the Proms as "the world's largest and most democratic musical festival".

Robert Newman founded The Proms in 1895. Since 1927, the BBC has organised and broadcast The Proms. Each season consists of concerts in the Royal Albert Hall, chamber music concerts at Cadogan Hall (or occasionally other venues), additional Proms in the Park events across the UK on the Last Night of the Proms, and associated educational and children's events. Recently, concerts have been held in additional cities across different nations of the UK, as part of Proms Around the UK.

Prom is short for promenade concert, a term which originally referred to outdoor concerts in London's pleasure gardens, where the audience was free to stroll around while the orchestra was playing. In the context of the BBC Proms, promming refers to the use of the standing areas inside the hall (the Arena and Gallery) for which ticket prices are much lower than for the seating. Proms concert-goers, particularly those who stand, are sometimes referred to as "Prommers" or "Promenaders".

== History ==
=== Origins and Sir Henry Wood ===
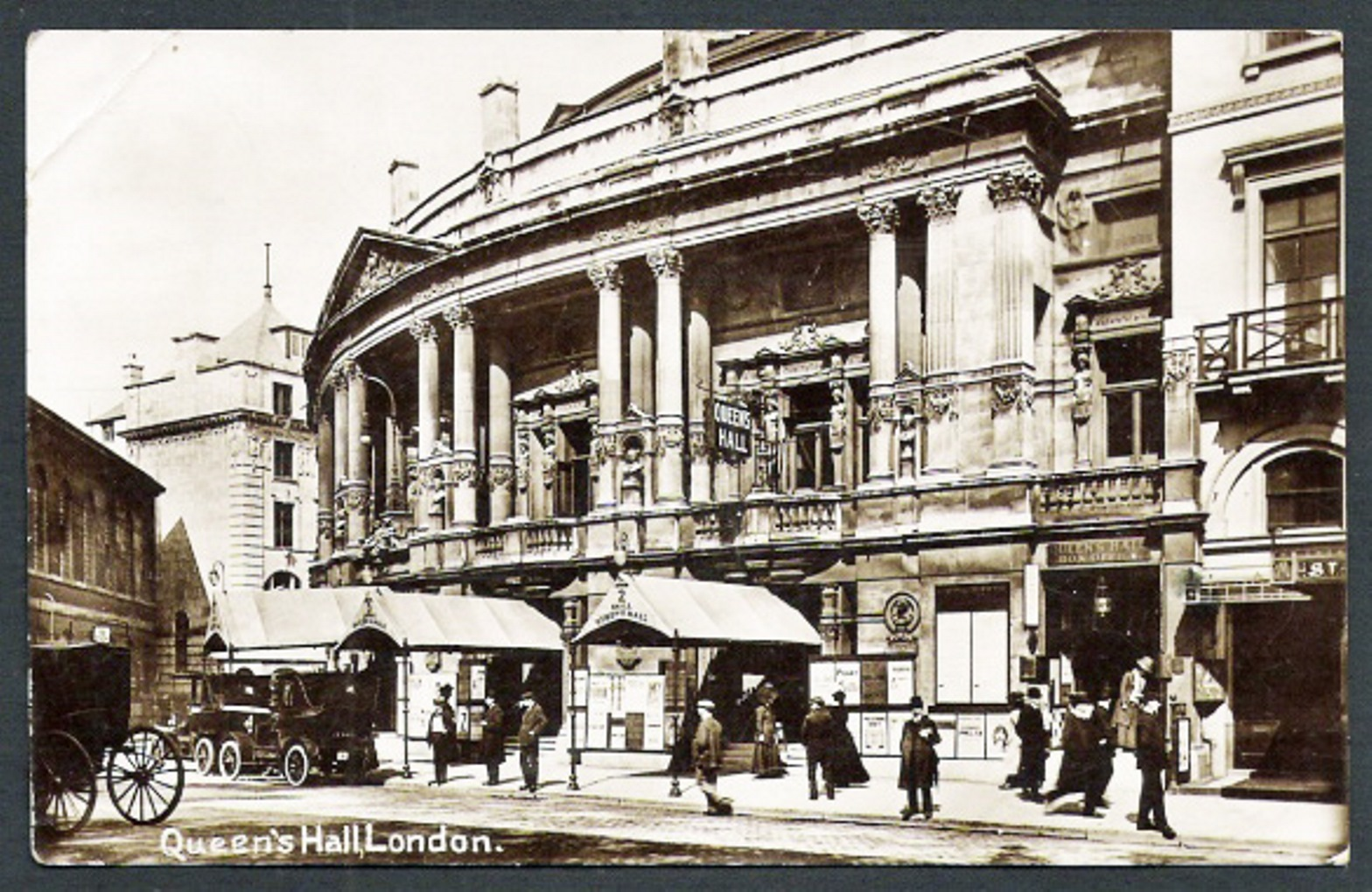
The first Promenade Concerts were held in the Queen's Hall until its destruction in 1941

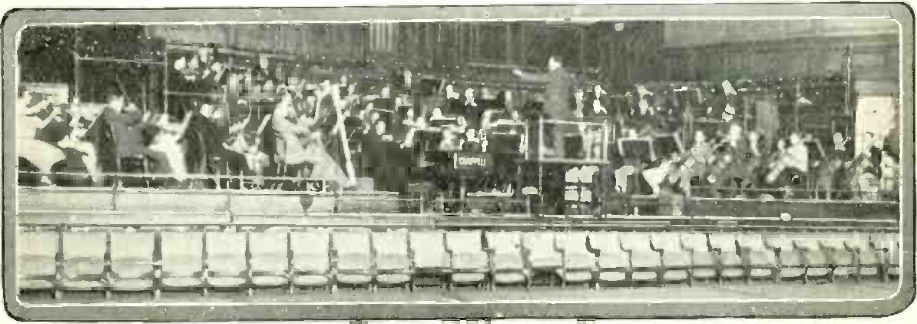
Sir Henry Wood's Queen's Hall Orchestra, rehearsing for the first Promenade Concert of the 1927 Season, from the BBC Hand Book 1928

Promenade concerts had existed in London's pleasure gardens since the mid-18th century, and indoor proms became a feature of 19th century musical life in London from 1838, notably under the direction of Louis Antoine Jullien and Sir Arthur Sullivan. The annual series of Proms continuing today had their roots in that movement. They were inaugurated on 10 August 1895 in the Queen's Hall in Langham Place by the impresario Robert Newman, who was fully experienced in running similar concerts at Her Majesty's Theatre. Newman wished to generate a wider audience for concert hall music by offering low ticket prices and an informal atmosphere, where eating, drinking and smoking were permitted to the promenaders. He stated his aim to Henry Wood in 1894 as follows:

I am going to run nightly concerts and train the public by easy stages. Popular at first, gradually raising the standard until I have created a public for classical and modern music.

George Cathcart, an otolaryngologist, gave financial backing to Newman for the series (called "Mr Robert Newman's Promenade Concerts") on condition that Henry Wood be employed as the sole conductor. Wood, aged 26, seized this opportunity and built the "Queen's Hall Orchestra" as the ensemble specially devoted to performing the promenade concerts. Cathcart also stipulated (contrary to Newman's preference) the adoption of French or Open Diapason concert pitch, necessitating the acquisition of an entirely new set of wind instruments for the orchestra, and the re-tuning of the Queen's Hall organ. This coincided with the adoption of this lower pitch by other leading orchestras and concert series. Although the concerts gained a popular following and reputation, Newman went bankrupt in 1902, and the banker Edgar Speyer took over the expense of funding them. Wood received a knighthood in 1911. In 1914, anti-German feeling led Speyer to surrender his role, and music publishers Chappell & Co. took control of the concerts.

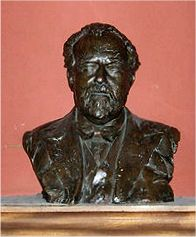
The bronze bust of Sir Henry Wood is placed in the Royal Albert Hall for the duration of the Proms

Although Newman remained involved in artistic planning, it was Wood's name which became most closely associated with the Proms. As conductor from the first concert (which opened with Wagner's Rienzi overture) in 1895, Sir Henry was largely responsible for building the repertoire heard as the series continued from year to year. While including many popular and less demanding works, in the first season there were substantial nights devoted to Beethoven or Schubert, and a programme of new works was given in the final week. Distinguished singers including Sims Reeves and Signor Foli appeared. In the first two decades Wood firmly established the policy of introducing works by contemporary composers (both British and international) and of bringing fresh life to unperformed or under-performed works. A bronze bust of Sir Henry Wood recovered from the ruins of the bombed-out Queen's Hall in 1941, and now belonging to the Royal Academy of Music, is still placed in front of the organ for the whole Promenade season. Though the concerts are now called the BBC Proms, and are headlined with the BBC logo, the tickets are subtitled "BBC Music presents the Henry Wood Promenade Concerts".

In 1927, following Newman's sudden death the previous year, the BBC (which was later based at Broadcasting House next to the Hall ) began running the concerts. This arose because William Boosey, then managing director of Chappell & Co. (the Prom proprietors), detested broadcasting and saw the BBC's far-reaching demands and intentions in the control of musical presentation as a danger to the future of public concerts altogether. He decided to disband the New Queen's Hall Orchestra, which played for the last time at a Symphony concert on 19 March 1927. He found it more expedient to let the Queen's Hall to the broadcasting powers, rather than to continue the Promenade concerts and other big series independently in an unequal competition with what he saw as effectively the Government itself. So the Proms were saved, but under a different kind of authority. The personnel of the New Queen's Hall Orchestra effectively continued until 1930 as "Sir Henry J. Wood and his Symphony Orchestra". When the BBC Symphony Orchestra (BBC SO) was formed in 1930, it became the main orchestra for the concerts. At this time the season consisted of nights dedicated to particular composers; Mondays were Wagner, Fridays were Beethoven, with other major composers being featured on other days. There were no Sunday performances.

=== During World War II ===
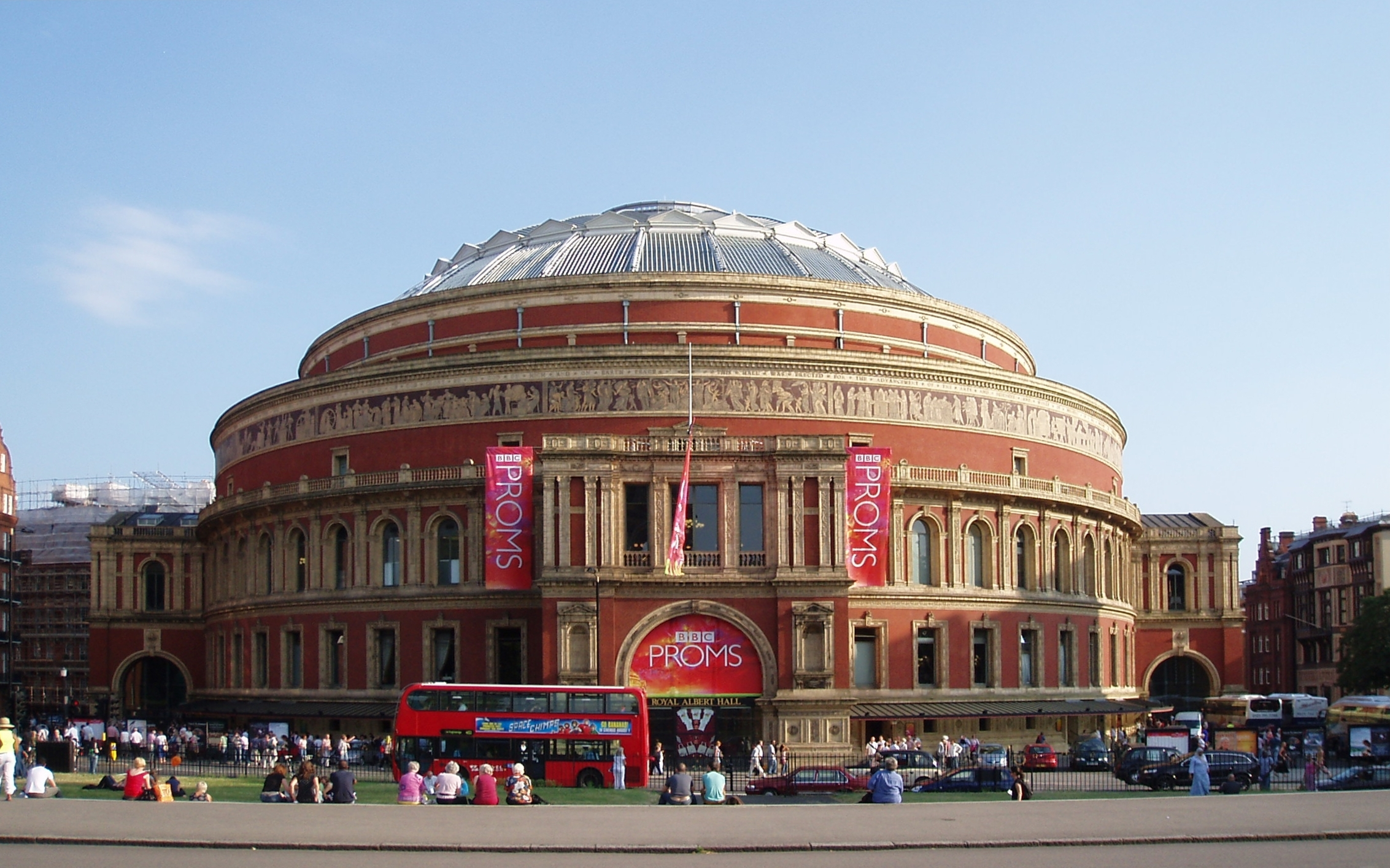
The Proms moved to the Royal Albert Hall in 1944 (pictured here during the 2008 Proms season

With the outbreak of World War II in 1939, the BBC withdrew its support. However private sponsors stepped in to maintain the Proms, always under Sir Henry Wood's direction, until the Queen's Hall was devastated beyond repair during an air raid in May 1941. (The site is now occupied by the St George's Hotel and BBC Henry Wood House). The concerts then moved (until 1944) to their current home, the Royal Albert Hall, during the Promenade season presented by Keith Douglas in conjunction with the Royal Philharmonic Society (of which he was Secretary).

The London Symphony Orchestra had sometimes assisted in the series since (after 1927) the New Queen's Hall Orchestra had ceased to function, and in 1942, Sir Henry Wood also invited the London Philharmonic Orchestra under its new leader Jean Pougnet to participate in this and subsequent seasons. In this he was attempting to maintain vigour in the programme, under the renewal of its relationship with the BBC as promoters. Sir Henry Wood continued his work with the Proms through vicissitudes with the BBC until his death in 1944, the year of his Jubilee Season. During that period Sir Adrian Boult, chief conductor of the BBC Symphony Orchestra, and Basil Cameron also took on conducting duties for the series, continuing them in 1944 when, under increased danger from bombing, they were moved again, this time to the Bedford Corn Exchange (home of the BBC Symphony Orchestra since 1941) which hosted them until the end of the War.

=== Post-war ===
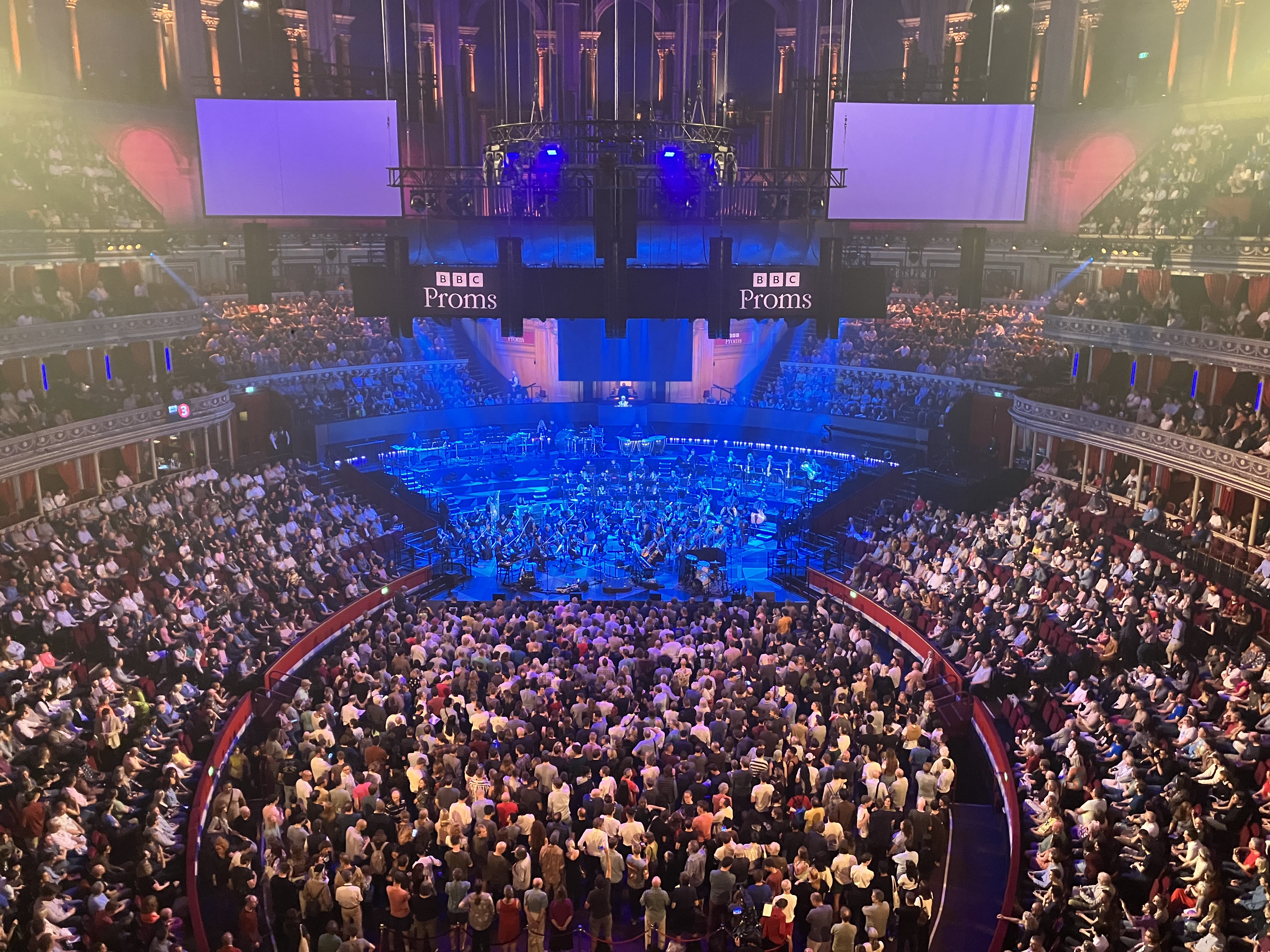
A promenade concert in the Royal Albert Hall, 2022

Sir Adrian Boult and Basil Cameron continued as conductors of the Promenade Concerts after the War, on their return to the Royal Albert Hall, until the advent of Malcolm Sargent as Proms chief conductor in 1947. Sargent held this post until 1966; his associate conductor from 1949 to 1959 was John Hollingsworth. Sargent was noted for his immaculate appearance (evening dress, carnation) and his witty addresses where he good-naturedly chided the noisy Prommers. Sir Malcolm championed choral music and classical and British composers, especially Samuel Coleridge-Taylor. The charity founded in his name, CLIC Sargent, continues to hold a special Promenade Concert each year shortly after the main season ends. CLIC Sargent, the Musicians' Benevolent Fund and further musical charities (chosen each year) also benefit from thousands of pounds in donations from Prommers after most concerts. When asking for donations, Prommers from the Arena regularly announce to the audience the running donations total at concert intervals through the season, or before the concert when there is no interval.

After Wood's death, Julian Herbage acted as de facto principal administrator of the Proms for a number of years, as a freelance employee after his retirement from the BBC, with assistance from such staff as Edward Clark and Kenneth Wright. During the tenure of William Glock as Controller of the Proms, from 1960 to 1973, the Proms repertory expanded both forwards in time, to encompass then contemporary and avant-garde composers such as Boulez, Berio, Carter, Dallapiccola, Peter Maxwell Davies, Gerhard, Henze, Ligeti, Lutosławski, Lutyens, Maw, Messiaen, Nono, Stockhausen, and Tippett, as well as backwards to include music by past composers such as Purcell, Cavalli, Monteverdi, Byrd, Palestrina, Dufay, Dunstaple, and Machaut, as well as less-often performed works of Johann Sebastian Bach and Joseph Haydn. From the 1960s, the number of guest orchestras at the Proms also began to increase, with the first major international conductors (Leopold Stokowski, Georg Solti, and Carlo Maria Giulini) performing in 1963, and the first foreign orchestra, the Moscow Radio Symphony Orchestra, performing in 1966. Since that time, almost every major international orchestra, conductor and soloist has performed at the Proms. In 1970, Soft Machine's appearance led to press attention and comment as the first "pop" band to perform there.

The 1968 season began on a Friday evening instead of the usual Saturday. This concert marked a tribute to Sir Malcolm Sargent who had died shortly after delivering a brief speech from the rostrum at the Last Night in 1967. He had been too ill to actually conduct that concert. Every year since then, the Proms have started on a Friday evening in mid-July.

=== Since 1990 ===
The Proms continue today, and still present newly commissioned music alongside pieces more central to the repertoire and early music. Innovations continue, with pre-Prom talks, lunchtime chamber concerts, children's Proms, Proms in the Park either appearing, or being featured more heavily at various points over the years. In the UK, all concerts are broadcast on BBC Radio 3, an increasing number are televised on BBC Four with some also shown on BBC One and BBC Two. The theme tune that used to be played at the beginning of each programme broadcast on television (until the 2011 season) was an extract from the end of the "Red" movement of Arthur Bliss's A Colour Symphony, in 2017 Anna Clyne's Masquerade (a Proms commission in 2013) and since 2019, an original theme by Ian Arber. It is also possible to hear the concerts live from the BBC Proms website. The Last Night is also broadcast in many countries around the world.

In 1996, a related series of eight lunchtime chamber concerts was started, taking place on Mondays during the Proms season. In their first year these were held in the Britten Hall of the Royal College of Music (just across Prince Consort Road from the Albert Hall). The following year they moved slightly further afield, to the Henry Cole Lecture Theatre at the Victoria and Albert Museum. In 2005, they moved further again, to the new Cadogan Hall, just off London's Sloane Square. These allow the Proms to include music which is not suitable for the vast spaces of the Albert Hall.

From 1998 to 2007, the Blue Peter Prom, in partnership with long-running BBC television programme Blue Peter, was an annual fixture. Aimed at children and families, the Prom is informal, including audience participation, jokes, and popular classics. High demand for tickets (which are among the lowest priced in the season) saw this Prom split in 2004 into two Proms with identical content. In 2008, the Blue Peter Prom was replaced with a Doctor Who Prom which was revived in the 2010, 2013 and 2024 seasons.

The 2004 season also featured the Hall's newly rebuilt pipe organ. It took two years to complete the task (2002–2004) and was the work of Noel Mander, Ltd., of London. It was the first complete restoration of the instrument since Harrison and Harrison's work in 1936.

The tradition of Promming remains an important aspect of the festival, with over 1000 standing places available for each concert, either in the central arena (rather like the groundlings in the pit at Shakespeare's Globe) or high in the hall's gallery. Promming tickets cost the same for all concerts (currently £8 as of 2026), providing a considerably cheaper option for the more popular events. Since most promming tickets cannot be bought until 9:30am on the morning of the concert (although there are full-season tickets and weekend passes available), they provide a way of attending otherwise sold-out concerts.

In 2010, the Proms Archive was introduced on the BBC Proms webpage, to allow for a systematic searching of all works that have been performed and all artists who have appeared at the Proms since their inception.

Successive Controllers of the Proms after Glock have been Robert Ponsonby (1973–1985), John Drummond (1986–1995), Nicholas Kenyon (1996–2007), and Roger Wright (2007–2014). Between 1986 and 2014, the post of Director, BBC Proms had mostly been combined with the role of Controller, BBC Radio 3. Edward Blakeman, editor of BBC Radio 3, became interim Proms Director upon Wright's departure in July 2014. In May 2015, the BBC announced the appointment of David Pickard as Director of BBC Proms, in succession to Wright. In November 2023, the BBC announced that Pickard would be departing as Proms Director after the 2024 season. In February 2024, Sam Jackson was appointed as Director of The Proms starting in the 2025 season.

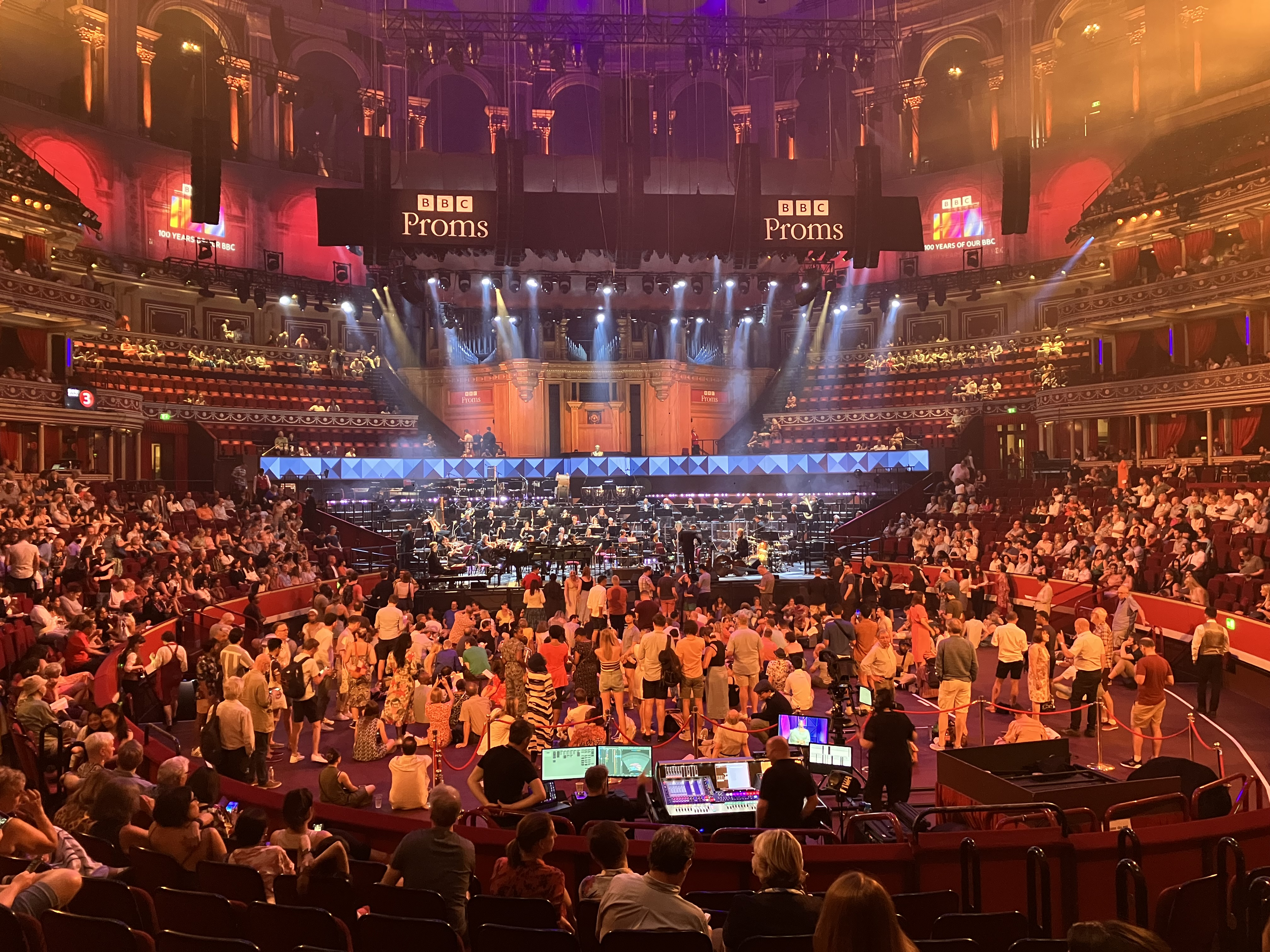
The Proms in 2022. Most people sit, while Promenaders stand in front of the orchestra. The bust of Sir Henry Wood can be seen in front of the organ.

== Last Night of the Proms ==
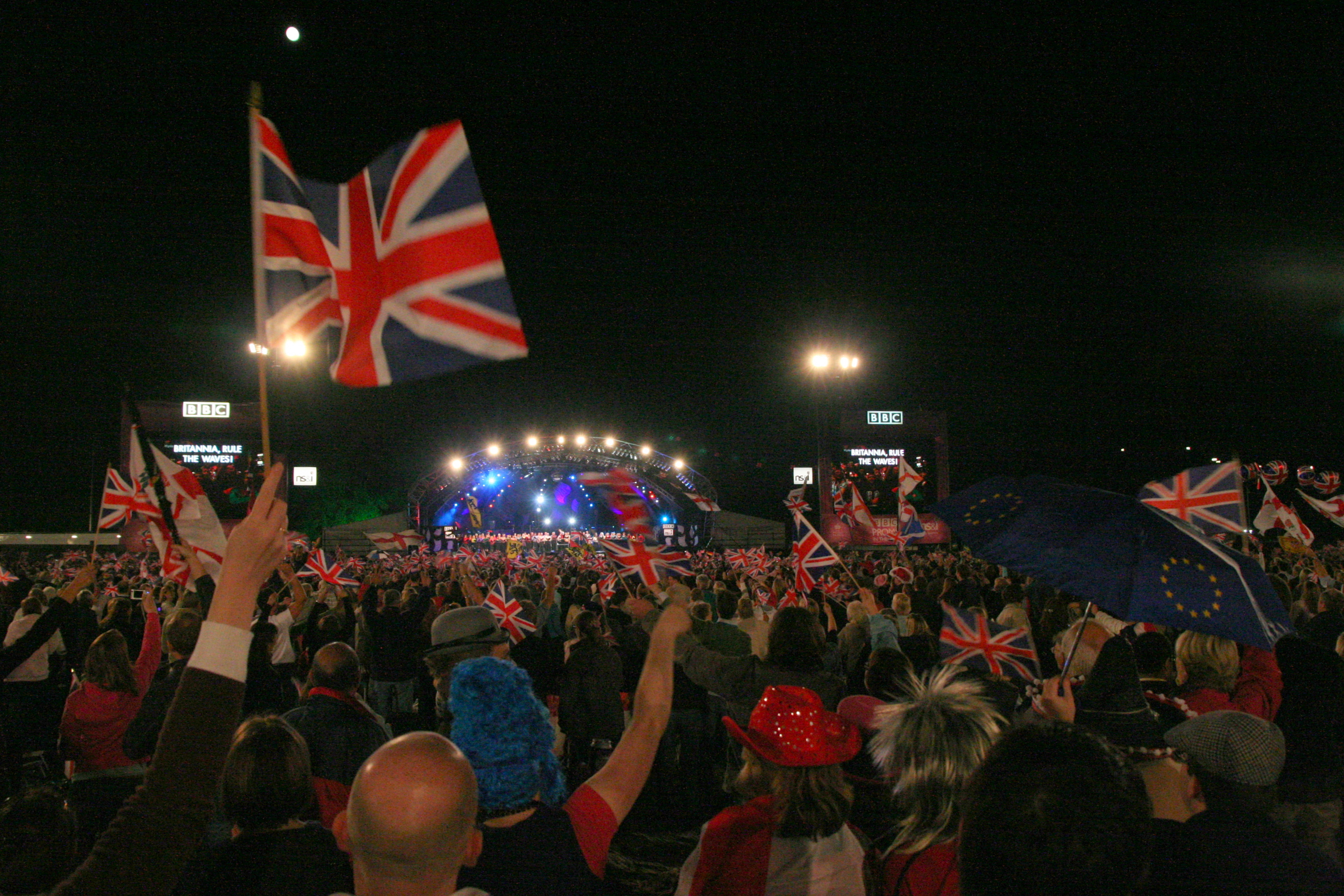
The Last Night of the Proms celebrates British tradition with patriotic music of the United Kingdom.

Many people's perception of the Proms is based on the Last Night, although this is very different from the other concerts. It usually takes place on the second Saturday in September, and is broadcast in the UK on BBC Radio 3, and on television on BBC Two (first half) and BBC One (second half). The concert is traditionally in a lighter, 'winding-down' vein, with popular classics followed by a second half of British patriotic pieces. This sequence traditionally includes Edward Elgar's "Pomp & Circumstance March No. 1" (to part of which "Land of Hope and Glory" is sung) and Henry Wood's "Fantasia on British Sea Songs", followed by Thomas Arne's "Rule, Britannia!". The concert concludes with Hubert Parry's "Jerusalem", and the British national anthem, since 2010 in an arrangement by Benjamin Britten. The repeat of the Elgar march at the Last Night can be traced to the spontaneous audience demand for a double encore after its premiere at a 1901 Proms concert. The closing sequence of the second half became fully established in 1954 during Sargent's tenure as chief conductor. The Prommers have made a tradition of singing "Auld Lang Syne" after the end of the concert, but this was not included in the programme until 2015. However, when James Loughran, a Scot, conducted the Last Night concert in the late 1970s and early 1980s he did include the piece within the programme.

Tickets are highly sought after. Promming tickets are priced the same as for that season's concerts, but seated tickets are more expensive. To pre-book a seat, an initial selection is released to winners of a ballot open to those who have booked five or more Prom concerts, along with an open ballot available for everyone to apply. Any remaining seated tickets after these two ballots are usually released on general sale on the opening day of the season in July, and usually sell out very quickly, although returns may be available across the season. For standing places, a full season pass automatically includes admission to the Last Night; some day Prommers can get limited tickets available on various dates by presenting five ticket-stubs from previous concerts, either in the Arena or Gallery (prior to 2009, the requirement was for six other concerts); a limited number of day Promming tickets are open to anyone on the morning of the concert, whether they have booked before or not. In the post-war period, with the growing popularity of the Last Night, the only way to obtain Promming tickets was through a postal ballot held well in advance of the concert.

Prommers with tickets are likely to queue up much earlier than usual (many overnight, and in past years, some slept outside the hall for up to three weeks to guard their place – although this is no longer permitted) to ensure a good place to stand; the resulting camaraderie adds to the atmosphere. Some attend in fancy dress, from black ties to patriotic T-shirts. Many use the occasion for an exuberant display of Britishness. Union Flags are waved by the Prommers, especially during "Rule, Britannia!". Other national flags, balloons, and party poppers are all welcomed – although John Drummond discouraged 'extraneous noise' during his tenure as director.

Sir Henry Wood's bust is adorned with a laurel chaplet by representatives of the Promenaders, who often wipe an imaginary bead of sweat from his forehead or make some similar gentle, visual joke. As with the rest of the season, the cost of promming tickets (standing tickets) is just £8. Many consider these to be the best tickets due to the atmosphere of standing in the hall for up to three hours; albeit with a twenty-five minute interval.

Another tradition is that near the end of the concert the conductor makes a speech thanking the musicians and audiences, mentioning the main themes of the season, noting the cumulative donation collected for the Promenaders' musical charities over the season, and announcing the date of the First Night for the following year. This tradition dates from 1941, when Sir Henry Wood gave the first such speech at the close of that season, which was the first at the Royal Albert Hall, when he thanked colleagues and sponsors. Wood gave a similar speech at the 1942 Last Night, and a pre-recorded version was played at the 1943 Last Night. During his tenure as conductor, Sir Malcolm Sargent established the tone of making the Last Night speech more humorous. Subsequent conductors have generally continued this, although one exception was in 1997 when Andrew Davis addressed the deaths of Diana, Princess of Wales, Mother Teresa, and Sir Georg Solti in 1997.

Leonard Slatkin, chief conductor of the BBC Symphony Orchestra from 2000 to 2004, expressed a desire to tone down the nationalism of the Last Night, and during the seasons from 2002 until 2007 "Rule Britannia" was only heard as part of Henry Wood's '"Fantasia on British Sea Songs" (another piece traditional to the Last Night) rather than separately. Slatkin, an American and the first non-Commonwealth citizen to lead the Last Night, conducted his first in 2001, just days after the 9/11 attacks. The atmosphere was more restrained and less festive than normal, with a heavily revised programme where the finale of Beethoven's 9th Symphony replaced the "Sea Songs", and Samuel Barber's "Adagio for Strings" was performed in tribute to 9/11 victims.

On the day of the 2005 Last Night, the hall management received word of a bomb threat, which led to a thorough search of the Albert Hall for 5 hours, but the concert took place after a short delay. This has led to increased security concerns, given the stature of the Last Night in British culture, which Jacqui Kelly of the Royal Albert Hall staff noted:

That was quite a nerve-wracker – our biggest event, the one everybody knows the Albert Hall for, and we were in real danger of losing it. We're an iconic thing, up there in the public eye, so we have to expect that.

2008 also contained some departures from the traditional programme. "Pomp and Circumstance March No. 1" was moved to after the conductor's speech. In addition, most of Wood's "Fantasia on British Sea Songs" was replaced by Vaughan Williams's Sea Songs as a final tribute in his anniversary year. However, Wood's arrangements of naval bugle calls from the start of the "Fantasia" were retained, and Sargent's arrangement of "Rule Britannia" returned with Bryn Terfel as soloist. As on his 1994 Last Night appearance, he sang one verse in a Welsh translation, with the chorus also translated into Welsh. Additionally, 2008 saw the inclusion of Scottish composer Anna Meredith to the programme for her Proms premiere, froms, which involved five different groups of musicians telecasting in from around Britain.

2009 saw the continued absence of Wood's Sea Songs, this time replaced by specially commissioned fanfares, and extracts from Handel's "Music for the Royal Fireworks". In 2009, for the first time, the Last Night was shown live in several cinemas across Asia and in Canada and Australia.

In 2020, the concert was performed to an empty hall, due to the COVID-19 restrictions in place in the UK. Two years later, in 2022, the concert was cancelled 48 hours before it was scheduled to happen, following the death of Queen Elizabeth II, the first Last Night cancellation since 1944. Dalia Stasevska had been selected to conduct. Stasevska returned to conduct the First Night in 2023, while Marin Alsop conducted the Last Night. This marked the first time that the BBC Proms had female conductors open and close the season. As a result of the cancellation, the date for the First Night of the 2023 Proms was not announced until April 2023.

=== Last Night conductors ===
The following table lists by year the conductors of the Last Night of the Proms. In general, since the tenure of Sargent, the Chief Conductor of the BBC Symphony Orchestra has led this concert, but guest conductors have directed the Last Night on several occasions. Additionally, the tradition was for a British conductor, and if not the current serving Chief Conductor, one who had an association with the BBC Symphony Orchestra or one of the other BBC orchestras. Charles Mackerras was the first non-British-born conductor to lead the Last Night, in 1980. Leonard Slatkin was the first American conductor of the Last Night in 2001. Jiří Bělohlávek was the first non-native English speaker to conduct the Last Night, in 2007. Marin Alsop was the Last Night's first female conductor in 2013.

Conductor	Last Night(s) ... (Note: The 1939 season was curtailed by the outbreak of war, and the 1940 season by German bombing, meaning that there was no official "Last Night". Only the first few concerts were held in public in 1944 due to renewed bombing. Wood died shortly before what should have been the end of the 1944 season. The 2022 season was curtailed by the death of Elizabeth II, meaning that there was no official "Last Night" for that year.)								
Conductor	19th c.–1940s	1950s	1960s	1970s	1980s	1990s	2000s	2010s	2020s
Henry Wood (Note: Sir Henry from 1911 onwards)	1895–1938, 1941–1943								
Sir Adrian Boult	1945, 1946, 1949 (Note: Duties undertaken as Guest Conductor, rather than as resident Chief Conductor, BBC Symphony Orchestra) (Note: Former Principal Conductor of the BBC Concert Orchestra)								
Basil Cameron	1945 (Note: Constant Lambert, Basil Cameron and Sir Adrian Boult jointly undertook proceedings upon the return in 1945)								
Constant Lambert	1945								
Sir Malcolm Sargent	1947–1948, 1950–1966								
Colin Davis (Note: Later Sir Colin)			1967–1972						
Norman Del Mar (Note: Former Chief Conductor of the BBC Scottish Symphony Orchestra)				1973, 1975	1983				
Sir Charles Groves (Note: Former Principal Conductor of the BBC Northern Symphony Orchestra (later the BBC Philharmonic))				1974, 1976, 1978					
James Loughran				1977, 1979	1981, 1982, 1984				
Sir Charles Mackerras					1980				
Vernon Handley					1985				
Raymond Leppard					1986				
Mark Elder (Note: Later Sir Mark)					1987		2006		
Sir Andrew Davis (Note: Sir Andrew from 1999 onwards)					1988	1990 (Note: Replacing Mark Elder)–1992, 1994–1999	2000	2018 (Note: Davis is currently Conductor Laureate of the BBC Symphony Orchestra, having served as Chief Conductor from 1989 to 2000.)	
Sir John Pritchard					1989				
Barry Wordsworth						1993			
Leonard Slatkin							2001–2004		
Paul Daniel							2005		
Jiří Bělohlávek							2007	2010, 2012	
Sir Roger Norrington							2008		
David Robertson							2009 (Note: Robertson was Principal Guest Conductor of the BBC SO from 2005 to 2012)		
Edward Gardner								2011	
Marin Alsop								2013, 2015	2023
Sakari Oramo								2014, 2016, 2017, 2019	2021, 2024, 2026
Dalia Stasevska									2020, ~~2022~~
Elim Chan									2025

== Proms in the Park ==
The Royal Albert Hall could be filled many times over with people who would wish to attend. To involve extra people, and to cater for those who are not near London, Proms in the Park concerts took place from 1996 to 2019. Initially there was one, in Hyde Park adjacent to the Hall, which was a simple video relay of the concert at the Royal Albert Hall. As audiences grew, Proms in the Park started to have musicians of their own on stage, including the BBC Concert Orchestra.

In the 2000s, Proms in the Park started to be held in other locations across the UK, usually with one of the BBC's orchestras playing. In 2005, Belfast, Glasgow, Swansea and Manchester hosted a Last Night Prom in the Park, broadcast live from each venue. In 2007 Manchester's prom was replaced by one in Middlesbrough. In 2008 the number reduced from five to four, in Hyde Park, Belfast, Glasgow and Swansea. 2009 returned to a total of five, in Hyde Park, Glasgow, Swansea, County Down and Salford. Each location had its own live concert, typically playing the national anthem of the host country, before joining in a live big screen video link up with the Royal Albert Hall for the traditional finale.

In later years Proms in the Park became a series of established events in their own right, with events in Hyde Park and in Scotland, Wales and Northern Ireland, managed by BBC Scotland, BBC Cymru Wales and BBC Northern Ireland respectively, in conjunction with the host local authority. Each event had a presenting team, a live orchestra, a video link to the Last Night of the Proms in London, and guest soloists and choirs. Events tended to move to different cities to cover a wider geographical area within the host nations.

All of these events were incorporated within BBC One's live coverage of the Last Night of the Proms, with live link-ups to each of the venues. However, some more traditional elements of the Last Night of the Proms (such as "Jerusalem", "Rule Britannia" and "Land of Hope and Glory") were removed in some years depending on local politics.

As the popularity of Proms in the Park grew, many communities across the UK decided to hold their own "Proms in the Park" events that were not affiliated with the BBC. The last official Proms in the Park took place in 2019, and no plans for its return have been announced.

Year	BBC Concert Orchestra	BBC National Orchestra and Chorus of Wales	BBC Scottish Symphony Orchestra	Ulster Orchestra	BBC Philharmonic (P) Hallé Orchestra (H) Northern Sinfonia (NS)
1996	Hyde Park, London				
1997	Hyde Park, London				
1998	Hyde Park, London				
1999	Hyde Park, London				
2000	Hyde Park, London				
2001	Hyde Park, London				Music Centre Gateshead (NS)
2002	Hyde Park, London			Belfast	Music Centre Gateshead (NS)
2003	Hyde Park, London	Singleton Park, Swansea	Pacific Quay, Glasgow	Donegal Square, Belfast	
2004	Hyde Park, London	Singleton Park, Swansea	Pacific Quay, Glasgow	Donegal Square, Belfast	Cathedral Gardens, Manchester (H)
2005	Hyde Park, London	Singleton Park, Swansea	Glasgow Green	Belfast City Hall	Heaton Park, Manchester (P)
2006	Hyde Park, London	Singleton Park, Swansea	Glasgow Green	Belfast City Hall	Heaton Park, Manchester (P)
2007	Hyde Park, London	Singleton Park, Swansea	Glasgow Green	Carrickfergus Castle	Centre Square, Middlesbrough (NS)
2008	Hyde Park, London	Singleton Park, Swansea	Glasgow Green	Belfast City Hall	
2009	Hyde Park, London	Singleton Park, Swansea	Glasgow Green	Hillsborough Castle, County Down	Buile Hill Park, Salford (P)
2010	Hyde Park, London	Singleton Park, Swansea	Caird Hall, Dundee	Hillsborough Castle, County Down	Buile Hill Park, Salford (P)
2011	Hyde Park, London	Caerphilly Castle	Caird Hall, Dundee	Castle Park, Bangor	
2012	Hyde Park, London	Caerphilly Castle	Glasgow City Halls	Titanic Slipways, Belfast	
2013	Hyde Park, London	Caerphilly Castle	Glasgow Green	Titanic Slipways, Belfast	
2014	Hyde Park, London	Singleton Park, Swansea	Glasgow Green	Titanic Slipways, Belfast	
2015	Hyde Park, London	Singleton Park, Swansea	Glasgow Green	Titanic Slipways, Belfast	
2016	Hyde Park, London	Colwyn Bay	Glasgow Green	Titanic Slipways, Belfast	
2017	Hyde Park, London	Singleton Park, Swansea	Glasgow Green	Castle Coole, Enniskillen	
2018	Hyde Park, London	Colwyn Bay	Glasgow Green	Titanic Slipways, Belfast	
2019	Hyde Park, London	Singleton Park, Swansea	Glasgow Green	Titanic Slipways, Belfast	

The first live relays outside of London were to Swansea and Birmingham in 1999.

In 2001, there were also live link-ups to Cornwall and Liverpool.

In 2011, Caerphilly's Proms in the Park was cancelled before the concert started due to heavy rainfall

== Proms seasons ==
No	Season	Start date (1st night)	End date (Last night)	Location	No of Proms
1	1895	Saturday 10 August	Saturday 5 October	Queen's Hall, London	49
2	1896	Saturday 29 August	Saturday 10 October	Queen's Hall, London	37
3	1897	Saturday 28 August	Saturday 9 October	Queen's Hall, London	43
4	1898	Saturday 27 August	Saturday 15 October	Queen's Hall, London	43
5	1899	Saturday 26 August	Saturday 21 October	Queen's Hall, London	49
6	1900	Saturday 25 August	Saturday 10 October	Queen's Hall, London	67
7	Summer 1901	Saturday 24 August	Saturday 9 October	Queen's Hall, London	67
7a	Winter 1901/02	Saturday 26 December	Saturday 1 February	Queen's Hall, London	33
8	1902	Saturday 23 August	Saturday 8 November	Queen's Hall, London	67
9	1903	Saturday 22 August	Friday 23 October	Queen's Hall, London	54
10	1904	Saturday 6 August	Friday 21 October	Queen's Hall, London	66
11	1905	Saturday 19 August	Friday 27 October	Queen's Hall, London	60
12	1906	Saturday 18 August	Friday 26 October	Queen's Hall, London	60
13	1907	Saturday 17 August	Saturday 26 October	Queen's Hall, London	61
14	1908	Saturday 15 August	Saturday 24 October	Queen's Hall, London	61
15	1909	Saturday 14 August	Saturday 23 October	Queen's Hall, London	61
16	1910	Saturday 13 August	Saturday 22 October	Queen's Hall, London	61
17	1911	Saturday 12 August	Saturday 21 October	Queen's Hall, London	61
18	1912	Saturday 17 August	Saturday 26 October	Queen's Hall, London	61
19	1913	Saturday 16 August	Saturday 25 October	Queen's Hall, London	61
20	1914	Saturday 15 August	Saturday 24 October	Queen's Hall, London	61
21	1915	Saturday 14 August	Saturday 23 October	Queen's Hall, London	61
22	1916	Saturday 26 August	Saturday 21 October	Queen's Hall, London	49
23	1917	Saturday 25 August	Saturday 20 October	Queen's Hall, London	49
24	1918	Saturday 11 August	Saturday 19 October	Queen's Hall, London	61
25	1919	Saturday 16 August	Saturday 25 October	Queen's Hall, London	61
26	1920	Saturday 14 August	Saturday 23 October	Queen's Hall, London	61
27	1921	Saturday 13 August	Saturday 22 October	Queen's Hall, London	61
28	1922	Saturday 12 August	Saturday 21 October	Queen's Hall, London	61
29	1923	Saturday 11 August	Saturday 20 October	Queen's Hall, London	61
30	1924	Saturday 9 August	Saturday 18 October	Queen's Hall, London	61
31	1925	Saturday 8 August	Saturday 17 October	Queen's Hall, London	61
32	1926	Saturday 14 August	Saturday 16 October	Queen's Hall, London	55
33	1927	Saturday 13 August	Saturday 24 October	Queen's Hall, London	37
34	1928	Saturday 11 August	Saturday 6 October	Queen's Hall, London	49
35	1929	Saturday 10 August	Saturday 5 October	Queen's Hall, London	49
36	1930 (Northern)	Monday 26 May	Saturday 21 June	Free Trade Hall, Manchester; Philharmonic, Liverpool; Town Hall, Leeds	24
36a	1930 (London)	Saturday 9 August	Saturday 4 October	Queen's Hall, London	49
37	1931	Saturday 8 August	Saturday 3 October	Queen's Hall, London	48
38	Summer 1932	Saturday 6 August	Saturday 1 October	Queen's Hall, London	49
38a	Winter 1932/33	Saturday 31 December	Saturday 14 February	Queen's Hall, London	13
39	1933	Saturday 12 August	Saturday 7 October	Queen's Hall, London	49
40	Summer 1934	Saturday 11 August	Saturday 6 October	Queen's Hall, London	49
40a	Winter 1934/35	Monday 31 December	Saturday 12 January	Queen's Hall, London	12
41	Summer 1935	Saturday 10 August	Saturday 5 October	Queen's Hall, London	49
41a	Winter 1935/36	Monday 30 December	Saturday 11 January	Queen's Hall, London	12
42	1936	Saturday 8 August	Saturday 3 October	Queen's Hall, London	49
43	1937	Saturday 7 August	Saturday 2 October	Queen's Hall, London	49
44	1938	Saturday 6 August	Saturday 1 October	Queen's Hall, London	49
45	1939	Saturday 12 August	Friday 1 September	Queen's Hall, London	17.5 (Note: The second half of concert 18 and the remaining 31 concerts (19–49) of the 1939 season (Saturday 2 September to Saturday 7 October) were cancelled after the United Kingdom received the news of the outbreak of World War II)
46	1940	Saturday 10 August	Saturday 7 September	Queen's Hall, London	25 (Note: Concerts 26–49 of the 1940 season (Saturday 8 September to Saturday 5 October) were cancelled due to intensified nightly air raids during World War II)
47	1941	Saturday 12 July	Saturday 23 August	Royal Albert Hall, London	37
48	1942	Saturday 27 June	Saturday 22 August	Royal Albert Hall, London	49
49	1943	Saturday 19 June	Saturday 21 August	Royal Albert Hall, London	55
50	1944	Saturday 10 June	Thursday 29 June	Royal Albert Hall, London	17 (Note: Concerts 18–55 (Friday 30 June to Saturday 12 August) of the 1944 season were cancelled due to V-1 flying bombs ("Doodle Bugs") which had started to fall on London during World War II)
51	1945	Saturday 21 July	Saturday 15 September	Royal Albert Hall, London	49
52	1946	Saturday 27 July	Saturday 21 September	Royal Albert Hall, London	49
52a	Winter 1947	Monday 6 January	Saturday 18 January	Royal Albert Hall, London	12
53	Summer 1947	Saturday 19 July	Saturday 13 September	Royal Albert Hall, London	49
53a	Winter 1948	Monday 5 January	Saturday 17 January	Royal Albert Hall, London	12
54	Summer 1948	Saturday 24 July	Saturday 18 September	Royal Albert Hall, London	49
54a	Winter 1949	Monday 10 January	Saturday 22 January	Royal Albert Hall, London	12
55	Summer 1949	Saturday 23 July	Saturday 17 September	Royal Albert Hall, London	49
55a	Winter 1950	Monday 9 January	Saturday 21 January	Royal Albert Hall, London	12
56	Summer 1950	Saturday 22 July	Saturday 16 September	Royal Albert Hall, London	49
56a	Winter 1951	Monday 8 January	Saturday 20 January	Royal Albert Hall, London	12
57	Summer 1951	Saturday 28 July	Saturday 22 September	Royal Albert Hall, London	49
58	Winter 1952	Monday 7 January	Saturday 19 January	Royal Albert Hall, London	12
58a	1952	Saturday 26 July	Saturday 20 September	Royal Albert Hall, London	49
59	1953	Saturday 25 July	Saturday 19 September	Royal Albert Hall, London	49
60	1954	Saturday 24 July	Saturday 18 September	Royal Albert Hall, London	49
61	1955	Saturday 23 July	Saturday 17 September	Royal Albert Hall, London	49
62	1956	Saturday 21 July	Saturday 15 September	Royal Albert Hall, London	49
63	1957	Saturday 20 July	Saturday 14 September	Royal Albert Hall, London	49
64	1958	Saturday 26 July	Saturday 20 September	Royal Albert Hall, London	49
65	1959	Saturday 25 July	Saturday 19 September	Royal Albert Hall, London	49
66	1960	Saturday 23 July	Saturday 17 September	Royal Albert Hall, London	49
67	1961	Saturday 22 July	Saturday 16 September	Royal Albert Hall, London	49
68	1962	Saturday 21 July	Saturday 15 September	Royal Albert Hall, London	49
69	1963	Saturday 20 July	Saturday 14 September	Royal Albert Hall, London	49
70	1964	Saturday 25 July	Saturday 19 September	Royal Albert Hall, London	49
71	1965	Saturday 17 July	Saturday 11 September	Royal Albert Hall, London	49
72	1966	Saturday 23 July	Saturday 17 September	Royal Albert Hall, London	50
73	1967	Saturday 22 July	Saturday 16 September	Royal Albert Hall, London	51
74	1968	Friday 19 July	Saturday 14 September	Royal Albert Hall, London	52
75	1969	Friday 18 July	Saturday 13 September	Royal Albert Hall, London	52
76	1970	Friday 17 July	Saturday 12 September	Royal Albert Hall, London	53
77	1971	Friday 23 July	Saturday 18 September	Royal Albert Hall, London	54
78	1972	Friday 21 July	Saturday 16 September	Royal Albert Hall, London	57
78a	Winter 1972/73	Friday 29 December	Friday 5 January	Royal Albert Hall, London	8
79	1973	Friday 20 July	Saturday 15 September	Royal Albert Hall, London	55
80	1974	Friday 19 July	Saturday 14 September	Royal Albert Hall, London	55
81	1975	Friday 25 July	Saturday 20 September	Royal Albert Hall, London	57
82	1976	Friday 16 July	Saturday 11 September	Royal Albert Hall, London	56
83	1977	Friday 22 July	Saturday 17 September	Royal Albert Hall, London	55
84	1978	Friday 21 July	Saturday 16 September	Royal Albert Hall, London	55
85	1979	Friday 20 July	Saturday 15 September	Royal Albert Hall, London	54
86	1980	Friday 18 July	Saturday 13 September	Royal Albert Hall, London	57 (Note: The first 20 concerts of the 1980 season were cancelled due to industrial action by the Musicians Union, meaning the de facto First Night was instead Prom 21 on Thursday 7th August.)
87	1981	Friday 17 July	Saturday 12 September	Royal Albert Hall, London	56
88	1982	Friday 16 July	Saturday 11 September	Royal Albert Hall, London	57
89	1983	Friday 22 July	Saturday 17 September	Royal Albert Hall, London	57
90	1984	Friday 20 July	Saturday 15 September	Royal Albert Hall, London	59
91	1985	Friday 19 July	Saturday 14 September	Royal Albert Hall, London	60
92	1986	Friday 18 July	Saturday 13 September	Royal Albert Hall, London	60
93	1987	Friday 17 July	Saturday 12 September	Royal Albert Hall, London	66
94	1988	Friday 22 July	Saturday 17 September	Royal Albert Hall, London	69
95	1989	Friday 21 July	Saturday 16 September	Royal Albert Hall, London	68
96	1990	Friday 20 July	Saturday 15 September	Royal Albert Hall, London	66
97	1991	Friday 19 July	Saturday 14 September	Royal Albert Hall, London	67
98	1992	Friday 17 July	Saturday 12 September	Royal Albert Hall, London	66
99	1993	Friday 16 July	Saturday 11 September	Royal Albert Hall, London	67
100	1994	Friday 15 July	Saturday 10 September	Royal Albert Hall, London	68
101	1995	Friday 21 July	Saturday 16 September	Royal Albert Hall, London	70
102	1996	Friday 19 July	Saturday 14 September	Royal Albert Hall, London	72
103	1997	Friday 18 July	Saturday 13 September	Royal Albert Hall, London	73
104	1998	Friday 17 July	Saturday 12 September	Royal Albert Hall, London	73
105	1999	Friday 16 July	Saturday 11 September	Royal Albert Hall, London	72
106	2000	Friday 14 July	Saturday 9 September	Royal Albert Hall, London	72
107	2001	Friday 20 July	Saturday 15 September	Royal Albert Hall, London	73
108	2002	Friday 19 July	Saturday 14 September	Royal Albert Hall, London	73
109	2003	Friday 18 July	Saturday 13 September	Royal Albert Hall, London	73
110	2004	Friday 16 July	Saturday 11 September	Royal Albert Hall, London	74
111	2005	Friday 15 July	Saturday 10 September	Royal Albert Hall, London	74
112	2006	Friday 14 July	Saturday 9 September	Royal Albert Hall, London	73
113	2007	Friday 13 July	Saturday 8 September	Royal Albert Hall, London	72
114	2008	Friday 18 July	Saturday 13 September	Royal Albert Hall, London	76
115	2009	Friday 17 July	Saturday 12 September	Royal Albert Hall, London	76
116	2010	Friday 16 July	Saturday 11 September	Royal Albert Hall, London	76
117	2011	Friday 15 July	Saturday 10 September	Royal Albert Hall, London	74
118	2012	Friday 13 July	Saturday 8 September	Royal Albert Hall, London	76
119	2013	Friday 12 July	Saturday 7 September	Royal Albert Hall, London	75
120	2014	Friday 18 July	Saturday 13 September	Royal Albert Hall, London	76
121	2015	Friday 17 July	Saturday 12 September	Royal Albert Hall, London	76
122	2016	Friday 15 July	Saturday 10 September	Royal Albert Hall, London	75
123	2017	Friday 14 July	Saturday 9 September	Royal Albert Hall, London	75
124	2018	Friday 13 July	Saturday 8 September	Royal Albert Hall, London	75
125	2019	Friday 19 July	Saturday 14 September	Royal Albert Hall, London	75
126	2020	Friday 17 July	Saturday 12 September	Royal Albert Hall, London	15 (Note: Due to the COVID-19 pandemic, the first 60 concerts (comprising the first six weeks of the season) were cancelled after plans to hold the concerts without an audience became financially unfeasible. During the first six weeks, concerts from previous seasons of the BBC Proms were shown on BBC Television; the final two weeks of the season were broadcast as scheduled live from London's Royal Albert Hall without an audience.)
127	2021	Friday 30 July	Saturday 11 September	Royal Albert Hall, London	61
128	2022	Friday 15 July	Thursday 8 September (de facto); Saturday 10 September (de jure)	Royal Albert Hall, London	69 (Note: The last three concerts, including the Last Night, were cancelled following the death of Queen Elizabeth II. However, on 8 September (the de facto Last Night of the Proms), when the Philadelphia Orchestra was about to perform the 70th Prom before being cancelled, out of respect for the Queen, they played the national anthem (Henry Wood's arrangement) and "Nimrod" from the Enigma Variations.)
129	2023	Friday 14 July	Saturday 9 September	Royal Albert Hall, London	71
130	2024	Friday 19 July	Saturday 14 September	Royal Albert Hall, London	73
131	2025	Friday 18 July	Saturday 13 September	Royal Albert Hall, London	79
132	2026	Friday 17 July	Saturday 12 September	Royal Albert Hall, London	86

== Proms Controllers ==
- William Glock (1960–1973)
- Robert Ponsonby (1973–1985)
- John Drummond (1986–1995)
- Nicholas Kenyon (1996–2007)
- Roger Wright (2007–2014)
- Edward Blakeman (interim Director; 2014–2015)
- David Pickard (2015–2024)
- Sam Jackson (2025–present)

== Protests ==
On various occasions, political protests have taken place in the auditorium, sometimes disrupting concerts.

On 1 September 2011, a Prom given by the Israel Philharmonic Orchestra was severely affected by interruptions from pro-Palestinian protesters. While the Palestine Solidarity Campaign had urged a boycott, they denied being behind the disruption inside the Royal Albert Hall. For the first time ever, the BBC took a Prom concert off the air. In 2016, anti-Brexit protestors waved EU flags in addition to the usual Union Jack flags. The protests have continued in subsequent years.

In July 2023, Just Stop Oil protestors halted a First Night performance by the BBC Symphony Orchestra and Chorus. In August 2025, a concert by the Melbourne Symphony Orchestra with pianist Khatia Buniatishvili was interrupted by a group protesting against the MSO's earlier handling of Jayson Gillham's comments about the killing of journalists in the Gaza war. In the same Proms season, the Israeli conductor Ilan Volkov concluded a concert with the BBC Scottish Symphony Orchestra with a speech calling for an end to hostilities in the Gaza war.

== See also ==
- BBC Radio 2 Electric Proms
- List of music festivals in the United Kingdom
