= Weathered (composition) =

Musical composition by Anna Clyne

Weathered is a clarinet concerto written in 2022 by the British composer Anna Clyne. The work was co-commissioned by the Royal Concertgebouw Orchestra, the Helsinki Philharmonic Orchestra, the Philharmonia Orchestra, and the Verbier Festival. It was given its world premiere by the clarinetist Martin Fröst and the Royal Concertgebouw Orchestra conducted by Jaap van Zweden at the Concertgebouw, Amsterdam, on January 5, 2023.

== Structure ==
Weathered has duration of about 27 minutes and is cast in five movements:

1. Metal
2. Heart
3. Stone
4. Wood
5. Earth

In the score program note, Clyne described each of the movements as "exploring a different weathered element," writing, "These weathered elements are both beautiful and poignant; a rusted bridge, a broken heart, a wind-worn castle, a majestic forest, and a warming planet. Weathered also touches on our collective global experiences of the COVID pandemic and the alarm of global warming."

== Instrumentation ==
The work is scored for solo clarinet and a medium sized orchestra consisting of two flutes (2nd doubling piccolo), two oboes, two additional clarinets (2nd doubling bass clarinet), two bassoons (2nd doubling contrabassoon), two horns, two trumpets, trombone, tuba, timpani, three percussionists, and strings.

== Reception ==
Reviewing the United Kingdom premiere, Andrew Clements of The Guardian described the concerto as "a substantial five-movement work," adding, "The writing for the soloist and the orchestra is strikingly vivid and colourful, from the opening moments, with their sombre, plainchant-like references, to the end of the finale almost half an hour later when the plainchant returns to usher in the quiet, desolate close."

David Nice of The Arts Desk was somewhat more critical of the work, however, describing it as "interesting, never dull, but I've heard better-shaped, more concise works from Clyne."
