= Color Field (composition) =

Orchestral composition by Anna Clyne

Color Field is an orchestral composition by the British-American composer Anna Clyne. The work was written in 2020 on a commissioned by the Baltimore Symphony Orchestra. It was given its world premiere by the Baltimore Symphony Orchestra under the direction of Marin Alsop at the Music Center at Strathmore on October 23, 2021.

== Composition ==
=== Background ===
Clyne dedicated the Color Field to the businesswoman and philanthropist Melanie Sabelhaus, who was a central inspiration for its composition. In the score program note, the composer wrote, "I began the creative process upon first meeting Sabelhaus in New York City, when I learned about her family, her Serbian roots, her work and the music she loves." Clyne learned Sabelhaus's particular fondness for color Hermès Orange and began researching the color. This eventually led her to discover Mark Rothko's 1961 painting "Orange, Red, Yellow"—an example of the abstract painting style known as color field, from which the piece derived its title.

=== Structure ===
Color Field has a duration of roughly 15 minutes and is cast in three movements named for the colors of the painting:

1. Yellow
2. Red
3. Orange

Clyne was also influenced by the concept of synesthesia, a perceptual phenomenon wherein a person may associate a pitch or tonal center with a specific color. She thus gave "Yellow" a tonal center of D, "Red" a tonal center of C, and "Orange" a tonal center of G. Clyne also incorporated a traditional Serbian melody to commemorate Sabelhaus's Serbian background in the first movement. The score program note concludes, "In 'Red,' the fires blaze with bold percussive patterns and lilting lines. In 'Orange,' the music becomes still and breathes, and then escalates once more, incorporating elements of 'Yellow' and 'Red' to create 'Orange'–the signature color of Melanie Sabelhaus."

=== Instrumentation ===
The work is cast for an orchestra comprising two flutes (2nd doubling piccolo), two oboes (2nd doubling Cor anglais), two clarinets (2nd doubling E-flat clarinet), two bassoons (2nd doubling contrabassoon), two horns, two trumpets, timpani, four percussionists, and strings.

== Reception ==
The music critic Andrew Clements of The Guardian gave the piece a positive review, remarking, "It makes a satisfying triptych, with the central Red movement's incessant, pounding percussion and vaguely martial brass framed by the rocking string harmonics of the opening Yellow and the consolatory quiet of the Orange finale."
