= Within Her Arms =

2009 orchestral composition by Anna Clyne

Within Her Arms is a composition for string orchestra by the British-born composer Anna Clyne. The work was commissioned by the conductor Esa-Pekka Salonen and the Los Angeles Philharmonic. It was first performed April 7, 2009, at the Walt Disney Concert Hall in Los Angeles by the Los Angeles Philharmonic under Salonen. The piece was composed in memory of Clyne's mother, who died in 2008.

== Composition ==
Within Her Arms is scored for a string orchestra consisting of 15 players. The work has a duration 14 minutes and is composed in one continuous movement. Concerning the dedication of the piece to her late mother, Clyne simply wrote, "Within Her Arms is music for my mother, with all my love."

== Reception ==
Alex Ross of The New Yorker called the work "a fragile elegy for fifteen strings; intertwining voices of lament bring to mind English Renaissance masterpieces of Thomas Tallis and John Dowland, although the music occasionally breaks down into spells of static grief, with violins issuing broken cries over shuddering double-bass drones." Mark Swed of the Los Angeles Times similarly lauded that it "had the feel of wholesome traditional British string music enlivened by a new spirit."

Lawrence A. Johnson of the Chicago Classical Review particularly praised the piece, writing:

Within Her Arms is a powerful work, a somber, deeply felt meditation on loss. Crafted with real mastery for strings, Clyne's work never descends to the sentimental or lachrymose, the music working its way through desolation and painful stabbing violin accents to a sense of hard-won solace and peace.

He added, "This is one of the English composer's most personal and finest efforts to date, and one could easily see this powerful elegy entering the regular string repertoire."
