= Prince of Clouds =

2012 double concerto by composer Anna Clyne

Prince of Clouds is a double concerto for two violins and string orchestra by the British-born composer Anna Clyne. The work was jointly commissioned by the Chicago Symphony Orchestra, the IRIS Orchestra, the Los Angeles Chamber Orchestra, and the Curtis Institute of Music. It was composed in the summer of 2012 at the Hermitage Artist Retreat and was first performed on November 3, 2012, in Germantown, Tennessee by the violinists Jennifer Koh and Jaime Laredo with the IRIS Orchestra under conductor Michael Stern. The piece was nominated for the 2015 Grammy Award for Best Classical Contemporary Composition.

== Composition ==
Prince of Clouds has a duration of roughly 14 minutes and is composed in a single movement.

=== Inspiration ===
Clyne described her inspiration for the piece in the score program notes, writing:

When writing Prince of Clouds I was contemplating the presence of musical lineage—a family-tree of sorts that passes from generation to generation. This transfer of knowledge and inspiration between generations is a beautiful gift. Composed specifically for Jennifer Koh and her mentor at the Curtis Institute of Music, Jaime Laredo, this thread was in the foreground of my imagination as a dialogue between the soloists and ensemble. As a composer, working with such virtuosic, passionate and unique musicians is also another branch of this musical chain.

== Reception ==
Reviewing the December 2012 Chicago premiere, Lawrence A. Johnson of the Chicago Classical Review compared the work favorably to Clyne's previous composition Within Her Arms and wrote, "Prince of Clouds is wrought with Clyne's characteristic craft and care, and offers the composer's brand of reflective introspection that is consistently attractive." Mark Swed of the Los Angeles Times similarly praised, "Like Within Her Arms, the score is within her arms, which is to say that it has an enveloping quality. It begins with sweet, serene, intertwining violin solos, soon embraced by a sweet, intertwining string section." Despite this, Swed nevertheless added:

It is lovely music, slightly too lovely and thus interrupted by harshness. Brutal, raspy percussive interludes appear suddenly, like slashes of the knife on the music, but sweet melody always returns, swooping with ever more determination. There is never resolution. Balance is gained, lost and regained, never maintained. And that makes the sweet stuff start to sound strange, especially late in the 14-minute piece as uncentered phrases rise to a climax. In the score, Clyne gives the players alluringly contradictory instructions, such as "beautiful with unease," which pretty much sums up Prince of Clouds.

== See also ==
- Within Her Arms
- Anna Clyne
- Double concerto
- Grammy Award for Best Classical Contemporary Composition
