= Anna Clyne =

English composer (born 1980)

Anna Clyne (born 9 March 1980) is an English composer resident in the United States. She has worked in both acoustic music and electroacoustic music.

== Biography ==
Born on 9 March 1980 in London, Clyne began writing music as a child, completing her first composition at age 7. Her first composition to receive a public performance was at the Oxford Youth Prom when she was 11. She formally studied music at the University of Edinburgh, from which she graduated with a first-class Bachelor of Music degree with honours. She later studied at the Manhattan School of Music and earned an MA degree in music. Her teachers have included Marina Adamia, Marjan Mozetich and Julia Wolfe.

Clyne was director of the New York Youth Symphony's "Making Score" program for young composers from 2008 to 2010. In October 2009, the Chicago Symphony Orchestra (CSO) named Clyne and Mason Bates its co-composers in residence, as of the 2010–2011 season, with an initial contract of 3 years. In January 2012, the CSO extended their contracts as co-composers-in-residence through the 2013–2015 season. Additional residencies for Clyne as composer-in-residence with various orchestras have included:

- Orchestre National d'Île-de-France (2014–2016)
- Baltimore Symphony Orchestra (2015–2016)
- Berkeley Symphony Orchestra (2017–2019)
- Philharmonia Orchestra (2022–2023)
- Trondheim Symphony Orchestra (2022–2023)
- Helsinki Philharmonic Orchestra (2023–2024)
- BBC Philharmonic Orchestra (2024–2025)

Clyne was appointed Associate Composer with the Scottish Chamber Orchestra from 2019 to 2022.

Various arts institutions have commissioned and presented Clyne's work, including the Barbican, Carnegie Hall, Kennedy Center, Los Angeles Philharmonic, MoMA, Philharmonie de Paris, Royal Concertgebouw Orchestra, San Francisco Ballet, and the Sydney Opera House. In 2013, BBC Radio 3 commissioned Clyne to write the concert overture Masquerade for the Last Night of the Proms. Clyne was nominated for the 2015 Grammy Award for Best Contemporary Classical Composition for her double violin concerto, Prince of Clouds. Works for soloist and orchestra form an important part of her output, as is also evident from The Seamstress (2015), a single-movement violin concerto that incorporates a whispered recitation of the poem A Coat by Yeats, and the five movement cello concerto Dance (2019), commissioned by Inbal Segev and recorded by her in 2020.

Clyne has done several cross-genre collaborations, and has also worked with Yo-Yo Ma, Pekka Kuusisto, Martin Fröst, and Jess Gillam. Clyne has explored her interests in visual arts in several projects: five contemporary artworks inspired Abstractions (2016); Color Field (2020), takes inspiration from the artwork of Mark Rothko; and a film collaboration with Jyll Bradley, entitled Woman Holding a Balance (2021). Several commercial albums of her music have been released.

In November 2025 Clyne won an Ivor Novello Award for her piece Orbits for chorus and solo violin.

Clyne is married to the American sound engineer Jody Elff. Together, Clyne and Elff have created the Augmented Orchestra (AO), a method of sonic manipulation which expands the sound of an orchestra through computer-controlled processes. Current works by Clyne using AO include: Wild Geese (2023), The Gorgeous Nothings (2024) and PALETTE (2025). The couple reside in rural New York state.

== Compositions ==
=== Orchestra ===
- <<rewind<< for orchestra (2005–2006)
- Night Ferry for orchestra (2012)
- Masquerade for orchestra (2013)
- This Midnight Hour for orchestra (2015)
- Abstractions for orchestra (2016)
- RIFT for orchestra (2016)
- Restless Oceans for orchestra (2018)
- Color Field for orchestra (2020)
- PIVOT for orchestra (2021)
- This Moment for orchestra (2022)
- Wild Geese for orchestra and live electronics (2023)
- PALETTE for orchestra (2025)

=== Chamber orchestra ===
- Within Her Arms for string orchestra (2008–2009)
- Rest These Hands for chamber orchestra (2014)
- Sound and Fury for chamber orchestra (2019)
- Fractured Time for sinfonietta (2020)
- Shorthand for solo cello and string orchestra (2020)
- Stride for string orchestra (2020)

=== Chamber music ===
- Paint Box for amplified cello with guitar amp, music box and pre-recorded audio (2006)
- Steelworks for flute, bass clarinet, percussion and tape (2006)
- Beware Of for alto flute, harp, viola and tape (2007)
- Next. Stop for ensemble and tape (2007)
- Roulette for string quartet (2007)
- 1987 for ensemble (2008)
- The Violin – Complete works (7 short pieces for multi-tracked violins and optional video component by Josh Dorman) (2009)
- The Violin – Blue Hour for string ensemble (2009)
- The Violin – Lavender Rain for string ensemble (2009)
- The Violin – October Rose for 2 violins (2009)
- The Violin – Resting in the Green for 2 violins and tape or 5 violins (2009)
- The Violin – Ship of Stars for 2 violins and tape or 6 violins (2009)
- The Violin – Tea Leaves for 2 violins (with optional tape) (2009)
- A Hymn to the Virgin (Companion piece to "Lady Flow'r") for string quintet and tape (1930 rev. 1934 arr. 2010)
- Lady Flow'r (Companion piece to the arrangement of "Hymn to the Virgin") for string quintet and tape (2010)
- Primula Vulgaris for string quartet (2010)
- Shadow of the Words for string quartet (2010)
- A Wonderful Day for amplified ensemble and pre-recorded audio (2013)
- Just As They Are for amplified ensemble and pre-recorded audio (2015)
- This lunar Beauty for soprano, mixed ensemble and pre-recorded audio (2015)
- Breathing Statues for string quartet (2019)
- Masquerade for wind ensemble (2019)
- Shorthand for cello and string quintet (2020)
- Overflow for wind ensemble (2020)
- A Thousand Mornings for piano trio (2020)
- Woman Holding a Balance for string quartet (2020)
- Strange Loops for clarinet quintet (2021)
- A Slash of Blue for chamber ensemble (2022)

=== Soloist and orchestra ===
- Fits + Starts for amplified cello and tape (2003)
- Choke for baritone saxophone (or bass clarinet) and tape (2004)
- Rapture for clarinet and tape (2005)
- On Track for piano and tape (2007)
- Prince of Clouds for two violins and orchestra (2012)
- Secret Garden for drum set and tape (2013)
- Rest These Hands for violin and string orchestra (2014)
- The Seamstress for violin and orchestra (2014–2015)
- Three Sisters for mandolin and string orchestra (2017)
- DANCE for cello and orchestra (2019)
- Shorthand for cello and string orchestra (2020)
- Glasslands for soprano saxophone and orchestra (2021)
- Quarter Days for string quartet and orchestra (2021)
- Time and Tides for violin and orchestra (2022)
- Weathered for clarinet and orchestra (2022)
- ATLAS for piano and orchestra (2023)

=== Solo and duet ===
- Fits + Starts for amplified cello and tape (2003)
- Choke for baritone saxophone (or bass clarinet) and tape (2004)
- Rapture for clarinet and tape (2005)
- On Track for piano and tape (2007)
- Rest These Hands for violin (2009)
- Rest These Hands for viola (2009)
- Rest These Hands for cello (2009)
- Secret Garden for drum set and tape (2013)
- Snake & Ladder for soprano saxophone and live processing (2019)
- Snake & Ladder for clarinet and live processing (2019)
- Hopscotch for flute (2019)
- Reveal for solo viola and optional pre-recorded track (2020)
- Zero at the Bone for solo bass clarinet and tape (2021)
- Perched for solo flute and tape (2021)
- Red Nines for solo piano (2021)

=== Brass ensemble ===
- Spangled Unicorn (2011)

=== Ensemble with voice ===
- Blush for baritone, laptop and chamber ensemble (2007)
- As Sudden Shut for 3 female voices and ensemble (2012)
- The Lost Thought for 3 female voices and ensemble (2013)
- Postponeless Creature for 3 female voices and ensemble (2014)
- This Lunar Beauty for soprano, mixed ensemble and pre-recorded audio (2015)
- Between the rooms for soprano and string quintet (2022)
- The Gorgeous Nothings for amplified voices and orchestra (texts by Emily Dickinson, 2024)

=== Choral works ===
- Pocket Book VIII for 8 voices (2015)
- Pocket Book LXV for 8 voices (2015)
- Body Compass for children's chorus and string quintet (2017)
- The Heart of Night for choir (2020)
- In Thy Beauty for soprano, SATB chorus and orchestra (2021)
- The Years for SATB chorus and orchestra (2021)

== Discography ==
- I Am Not (New Amsterdam, 2010)
- The Exploding Piano (CD Baby, 2010)
- ACO Playing it Unsafe (ACO, 2011)
- Arcana VI by John Zorn (Tzadik, 2012)
- Blue Moth (Tzadik, 2012)
- Two × Four (Cedille, 2014)
- BOAC Field Recordings (Cantaloupe, 2015)
- The Violin (National Sawdust Tracks, 2017)
- The World is (Y)ours (Arcantus, 2019)
- E PLURIBUS UNUM (Navona, 2020)
- Touch Harmonious (In A Circle, 2020)
- DANCE (AVIE, 2020)
- Mythologies (AVIE, 2020)
- Mythologies on Vinyl (AVIE, 2020)
- The Kreutzer Project (AVIE, 2022)
