= Concertone for two Violins and Orchestra =

1774 composition by W. A. Mozart

Concertone for Two Violins and Orchestra
- by W. A. Mozart
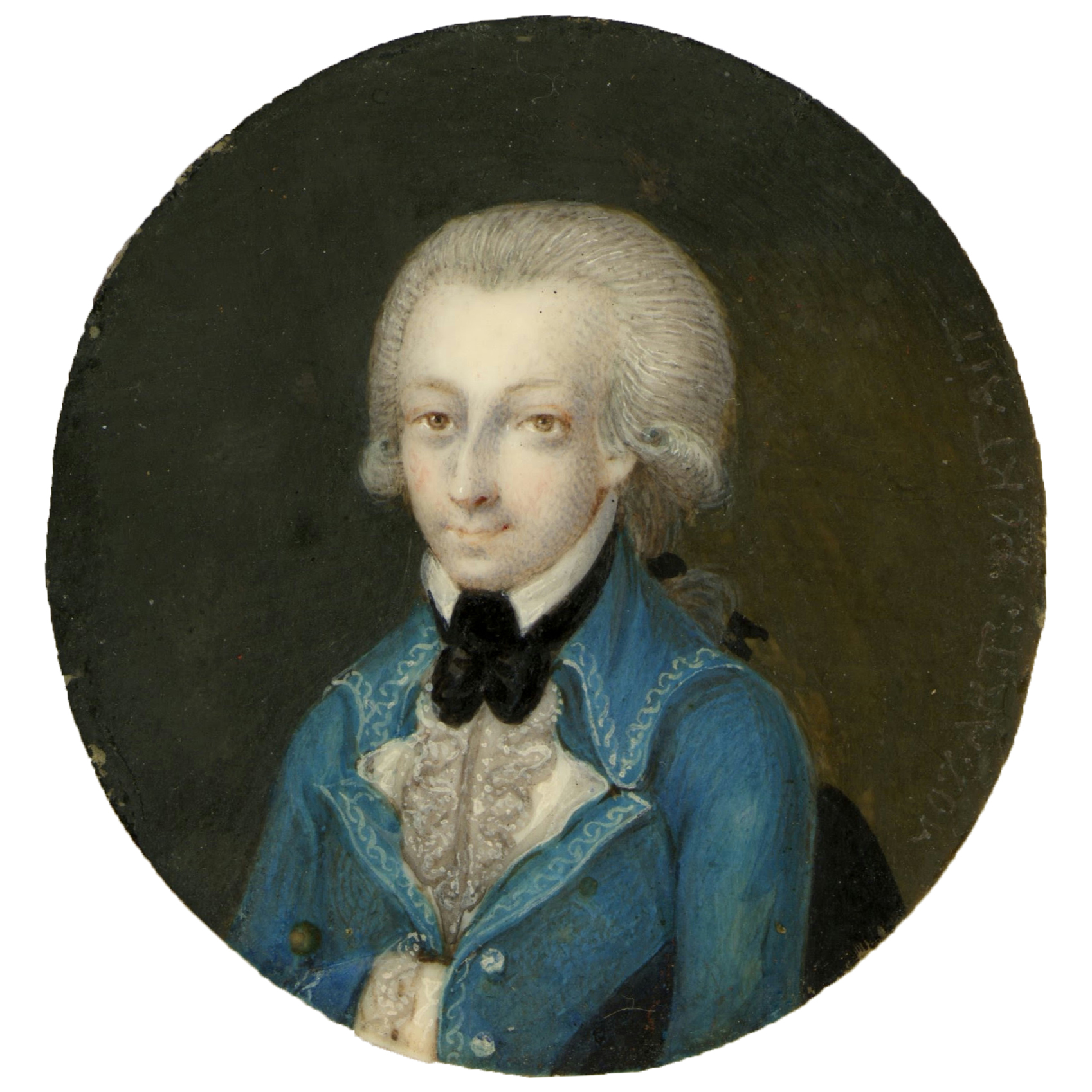
- 1773 miniature of Mozart
- Key: C major
- Catalogue: K. 190 (186E)
- Genre: Sinfonia concertante
- Style: Classical period
- Composed: 1774
- Movements: Three (Allegro spiritoso, Andantino grazioso, Tempo minuetto. Vivace)
- Scoring: two Violins; orchestra

The Concertone for Two Violins and Orchestra in C major, K. 190 (186E) was written by Wolfgang Amadeus Mozart in May 1774.

== History ==
Despite illegible handwriting, an xray of the manuscript revealed a date of 31 May 1774. According to Hans Engel, the piece was composed in Italy, although Salzburg is written on the title page and is accepted as the place of composition, completed soon after Mozart's return from an extended trip to Italy.

The circumstances for the Salzburg performance are unknown, however, the inclusion of trumpets suggest it may have been a celebratory or festive occasion. Mozart himself may have played one of the solo violin parts. Presumably the Concertone was performed by the Salzburg court orchestra. Music with string solos was fashionable at the time, led by Mozart's employer Archbishop Colloredo, who himself played the violin. It was written before the 1775 violin concertos in Salzburg, and was first published in 1870 in Leipzig by August Cranz Hofmeister. It was also published by Breitkopf & Härtel in 1880. The original autograph manuscript is housed at the Morgan Library & Museum in New York City.

During the time of composition, Mozart was going through a particularly productive phase in his teen years. He'd just completed his Symphony No. 25 in G minor, K. 183 a few months earlier, as well as his first original piano concerto, K. 175 and he was soon to begin work on an opera for Munich, projected for the Carnival season of 1775–75, La finta giardiniera.

Mozart must have thought highly of the work, as he brought the manuscript with him on his journey through Mannheim, Munich and ultimately Paris in 1778. Wolfgang's father Leopold urged him to have the work performed in Mannheim, but it was never realised and Mozart performed it in a keyboard reduction.

== Description ==
=== Concertone ===
Mozart simply wrote "Concertone" (large concert) on the autograph score. An Italian term which meant more than one soloist with an accompanying orchestra, similar to a symphonie concertante. Leopold Mozart also called the work a concertone in his copy. The title page of the score only refers to two solo violins and orchestra. But the music contains notable solo writing for the oboe, cello and with a few passages for divided violas and for a solo double bass.

One of Mozart's earliest concertos, the Concertone has similarities in form to the earlier concerto grosso form, as well as contemporary concertante works, such as Joseph Haydn's symphonies nos. 6 to 8, "Le Matin", "Le Midi" and "Le Soir", and similar styled works by J. C. Bach. This form of writing was popular in Paris at the time. The flautist Johann Baptist Wendling was enthusiastic about the Concertone and arranged to have it performed in Paris or possibly Mannheim. Wendling exclaimed "it is just the thing for Paris". The Mozart scholar Alexander Hyatt King remarked "a hybrid work in which the old genre got a new soul ... the juxtaposition of baroque concerto grosso instruments mixes well with the new galant style”.

The work is scored for two solo violins; two oboes; two horns in C, and in F for the second movement; two trumpets in C (silent in the second movement); and strings.

=== Movements ===
The three movements are marked:

1. Allegro spiritoso in common time
2. Andantino grazioso in F major in triple time 3/4
3. Tempo di minuetto – Vivace in triple time 3/4

The first movement shows similarities to the French style of writing at the time, however the dynamic markings are more of the Mannheim style. Mozart wrote out the cadenza for the first movement. The extended long second movement displays lyrical trills and a masterful polyphonic interaction of the solo performers. The minuet finale is cheerful and at a faster tempo, also affording the soloists opportunities to display their virtuosic skills. A typical performance lasts between 25 and 30 minutes.
