= Concerto No. 5 =

Concerto No. 5 may refer to:

- Piano Concerto No. 5 (disambiguation)
  - Piano Concerto No. 5 (Beethoven) in E-flat major, Emperor
  - Piano Concerto No. 5 (Field) in C major, L'incendie par l'orage
  - Piano Concerto No. 5 (Herz) in F minor
  - Piano Concerto No. 5 (Litolff) in C minor
  - Piano Concerto No. 5 (Moscheles) in C major
  - Piano Concerto No. 5 (Mozart) in D major
  - Piano Concerto No. 5 (Prokofiev) in G major
  - Piano Concerto No. 5 (Rubinstein) in E-flat major
  - Piano Concerto No. 5 (Saint-Saëns) in F major, Egyptian
  - Piano Concerto No. 5 (Bach) in F minor, (BWV 1056)
- Violin Concerto No. 5 (disambiguation)
  - Violin Concerto No. 5 (Mozart) in A Major
  - Violin Concerto No. 5 (Paganini) in A minor
  - Violin Concerto No. 5 (Vieuxtemps) in A minor
- The fifth of the Harpsichord concertos (J. S. Bach)
- The fifth of the Brandenburg_concertos

== See also ==
- Concerto
