= Symphony No. 3 (Furtwängler) =

Wilhelm Furtwängler in 1950s

Wilhelm Furtwängler's Symphony No. 3 in C♯ minor was written between 1951 and 1954. It is in four movements:

1. Largo
2. Allegro
3. Adagio
4. Allegro assai

At first, the four movements had programmatic headings: "Disaster," "Under compulsion to life," "Beyond" and "The conflict continues." At the time of his death, Furtwängler was still working on the last movement. In 1956, Joseph Keilberth conducted the Berlin Philharmonic in the première of the first three movements. Elisabeth Furtwängler did not allow the Finale to be performed until much later (a piece more complete than, say, the Finale of Bruckner's Symphony No. 9). Yehudi Menuhin conducted the public premiere of the whole piece in 1986, four years after a transmitted BBC studio performance with the BBC Symphony Orchestra conducted by Brian Wright.

== Discography ==
To complement Furtwängler's own recording of his Symphony No. 2 with the Berlin Philharmonic, the Orfeo label recorded Wolfgang Sawallisch for this one with the Bayerisches Staatsorchester. Sawallisch's recording does not include the Finale, but Alfred Walter's and George Alexander Albrecht's do (conducting the RTBF Symphony Orchestra on Marco Polo and the Staatskapelle Weimar on Arte Nova, respectively).
