= Piano Concerto in G major =

Piano Concerto in G major may refer to:

- Piano Concerto No. 17 (Mozart)
- Piano Concerto No. 4 (Beethoven)
- Piano Concerto No. 2 (Tchaikovsky)
- Piano Concerto in G major (Ravel)
- Piano Concerto No. 2 (Bartók)
- Piano Concerto No. 5 (Prokofiev)
