= Piano Concerto No. 5 =

Piano Concerto No. 5 refers to the fifth piano concerto written by one of a number of composers:

- Piano Concerto No. 5 (Bach) in F minor, (BWV 1056)
- Piano Concerto No. 5 (Beethoven) in E-flat major, Emperor
- Piano Concerto No. 5 (Field) in C major, L'incendie par l'orage
- Piano Concerto No. 5 (Herz) in F minor
- Piano Concerto No. 5 (Litolff) in C minor
- Piano Concerto No. 5 (Moscheles) in C major
- Piano Concerto No. 5 (Mozart) in D major
- Piano Concerto No. 5 (Prokofiev) in G major
- Piano Concerto No. 5 (Ries) in D major, Concerto Pastorale
- Piano Concerto No. 5 (Rubinstein) in E-flat major
- Piano Concerto No. 5 (Saint-Saëns) in F major, Egyptian
- Piano Concerto No. 5 (Villa-Lobos)

== See also ==
- List of compositions for piano and orchestra
