= Federico Mompellio =

Italian musicologist, music editor, music librarian and music critic

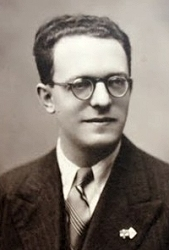
Federico Mompellio

Federico Mompellio (September 9, 1908 – August 7, 1989) was an Italian musicologist, music editor, music librarian, and music critic. He worked as a music librarian and professor of music history at several conservatories and universities during a lengthy academic career that began in 1933 and extended into the 1980s. As a scholar, he is best remembered for his biographies of the composers Niccolò Paganini and Sigismondo d'India. He also worked extensively as a music editor on the works of Paganini for the music publisher Casa Ricordi, most notably reconstructing Paganini's Violin Concerto No. 5; a work which was unknown until manuscripts were discovered in 1972 long after the composer's death.

== Early life and education ==
Born in Genoa, Mompellio began his studies in music in his youth; studying the piano privately with R. Lifschitz in his native city. He studied music composition at the Conservatorio di Musica Niccolò Paganini in his native city with Mario Barbieri before graduating from the Parma Conservatory with degrees in piano performance in 1926 and in music composition in 1928.

In 1924 Mompellio met the musicologist Adelmo Damerini who sparked a passion for music history and musicology within Mompellio. In 1932 he graduated with a Master of Arts degree in literature from the University of Genoa; writing a thesis targeted within the field of music history. He also took several courses in musicology taught by Fausto Torrefranca at Genoa University, and developed a long lasting friendship with Torrefranca that continued after he completed his education.

== Career ==
In 1933 Mompellio joined the faculty of the Palermo Conservatory as both a professor of music history and music librarian, but left after one year to become a professor of both music composition and music history as well as music librarian at the Parma Conservatory. He remained in that position until 1938 when he was appointed librarian at the Milan Conservatory; serving in that position for the next eleven years. He was largely responsible for saving the library's contents from destruction during World War II.

In 1949 Mompellio's role at the Milan Conservatory changed from that of librarian to professor of music history; a position he remained in until 1968. He also served as the vice-director of the conservatory for part of his later tenure at that institution. He concurrently taught courses in music history part time at other universities during the first half of the 1950s, including the University of Milan, University of Florence, University of Pavia, and University of Parma. In 1954 he joined the academic staff of the University of Parma and was made a full time professor there in 1968 when he left his position at the Milan Conservatory.

From 1964 to 1968, Mompellio served as president of the Italian Society of Musicology. He was also a member of the Accademia Nazionale di Santa Cecilia, and in 1983 he was the recipient of the Prix Antonio-Feltrinelli from the Accademia dei Lincei.

As a scholar, Mompellio is best remembered for writing biographies on the composers Niccolò Paganini and Sigismondo d'India. He also authored several monographs on neglected Italian composers from the 15th through 19th centuries. As a music editor he transcribed and reconstructed music written by Paganini and other historic Italian composers into contemporary music notation for the music publisher Casa Ricordi, including Paganini's Violin Concerto No. 5; a work discovered in 1972 long after the composer's death. He also published several manuscripts of music by Paganini for which he served as music editor. He wrote music criticism for Il diapason, Rivista italiana di musicologia, and Nuova Rivista musicale italiana among other periodicals.

Federico Mompellio died in Domodossola on August 7, 1989.
