= Wilhelm Furtwängler =

German conductor and composer (1886–1954)

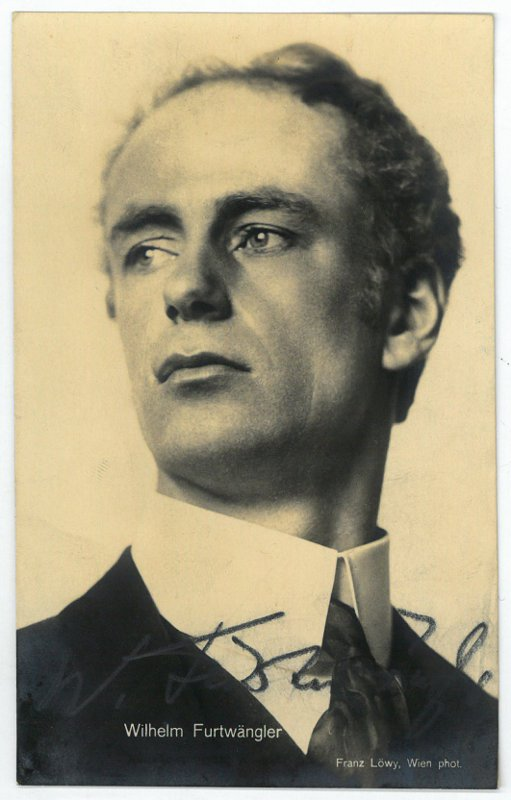
Furtwängler in 1912

Gustav Heinrich Ernst Martin Wilhelm Furtwängler (UK: /ˈfʊərtvɛŋɡlər/ FOORT-veng-glər, US: /-vɛŋlər/ -lər; German: [ˈvɪlhɛlm ˈfʊɐ̯tvɛŋlɐ]; 25 January 1886 – 30 November 1954) was a German conductor and composer. He is regarded as one of the greatest symphonic and operatic conductors of the 20th century. He was a major influence for many later conductors, and his name is often mentioned when discussing their interpretative styles.

Furtwängler was principal conductor of the Berlin Philharmonic between 1922 and 1945, and from 1952 until 1954. He was also principal conductor of the Gewandhaus Orchestra (1922–26), and was a guest conductor of other major orchestras including the Vienna Philharmonic.

Although not an adherent of Nazism, he was the foremost conductor to remain in Germany during the Nazi era. Despite his open opposition to antisemitism and the ubiquity of Nazi symbolism, the regime did not seek to suppress him, at Joseph Goebbels' insistence, for propaganda reasons. This situation caused lasting controversy, and the extent to which his presence lent prestige to Nazi Germany is still debated.

== Early life ==
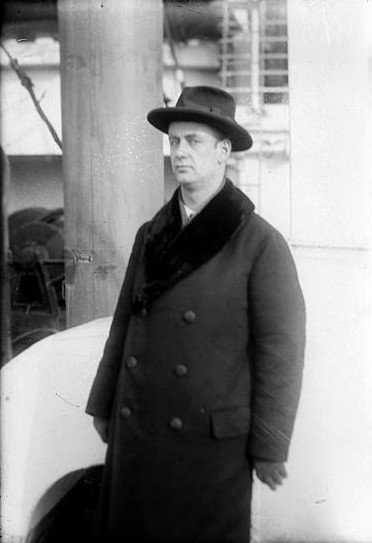
Furtwängler in 1925

Wilhelm Furtwängler was born into a prominent family in Schöneberg, Germany (now a district/borough of Berlin). His father, Adolf Furtwängler, was an archaeologist, and his mother was a painter. Most of his childhood was spent in Munich, where his father taught at the city's Ludwig-Maximilians-Universität München (LMU). He was given a musical education from an early age, and developed a great love for Ludwig van Beethoven, a composer with whose works he remained closely associated throughout his life.

As a boy he sometimes stayed with his grandmother in Mannheim. Through her family he met the Geissmars, a Jewish family who were leading lawyers and amateur musicians in the town. Berta Geissmar later wrote, "Furtwängler became so good at [skiing] as to attain almost professional skill... Almost every sport appealed to him: he loved tennis, sailing and swimming... He was a good horseman..." She also said that he was a strong mountain climber and hiker.

== Career ==
Although Furtwängler achieved fame chiefly from his conducting, he regarded himself foremost as a composer. He began conducting in order to perform his own works. By age of twenty, he had composed several works. However, they were not well received, and that, combined with the financial insecurity of a career as a composer, led him to concentrate on conducting. He made his conducting debut with the Kaim Orchestra (now the Munich Philharmonic) in Anton Bruckner's Ninth Symphony. He subsequently held conducting posts at Munich, Strasbourg, Lübeck, Mannheim, Frankfurt, and Vienna.

Furtwangler succeeded Artur Bodanzky as principal conductor of the Mannheim Opera and Music Academy in 1915, remaining until 1920.

Berta Geissmar subsequently became his secretary and business manager, in Mannheim and later in Berlin, until she was forced to leave Germany in 1935. From 1921 onwards, Furtwängler shared holidays in the Engadin with Berta and her mother. In 1924 he bought a house there. After he married, the house was open to a wide circle of friends.

In 1920 he was appointed conductor of the Staatskapelle Berlin succeeding Richard Strauss. In January 1922, following the sudden death of Arthur Nikisch, he was appointed to the Leipzig Gewandhaus Orchestra. Shortly afterwards he was appointed to the prestigious Berlin Philharmonic, again in succession to Nikisch. Furtwängler made his London debut in 1924, and continued to appear there before the outbreak of World War II as late as 1938, when he conducted Richard Wagner's Ring. (Furtwängler later conducted in London many times between 1948 and 1954). In 1925 he appeared as guest conductor of the New York Philharmonic, making return visits in the following two years.

In January 1945 Furtwängler fled to Switzerland. It was during this period that he completed what is considered his most significant composition, the Symphony No. 2 in E minor. It was given its premiere in 1948 by the Berlin Philharmonic under Furtwängler's direction and was recorded for Deutsche Grammophon.

Following the war, he resumed performing and recording, and remained a popular conductor in Europe, although his actions in the 1930s and 40s were a subject of ongoing criticism. He died in 1954 in Ebersteinburg, close to Baden-Baden. He is buried in the Heidelberg Bergfriedhof.

== Relationship with the Nazis ==
Furtwängler was very critical of Adolf Hitler's appointment as Chancellor of Germany, at the end of January 1933 and was convinced that Hitler would not stay in power for long. He had said of Hitler in 1932, "This hissing street pedlar will never get anywhere in Germany."

In 1933, Furtwängler met with Hitler to try to stop his new antisemitic policy in the domain of music. He had prepared a list of significant Jewish musicians: these included the composer Arnold Schoenberg, the musicologist Curt Sachs, the violinist Carl Flesch, and Jewish members of the Berlin Philharmonic. Hitler did not listen to Furtwängler, who lost patience, and the meeting became a shouting match. Berta Geissmar wrote, "After the audience, he told me that he knew now what was behind Hitler's narrow-minded measures. This is not only antisemitism, but the rejection of any form of artistic, philosophical thought, the rejection of any form of free culture..."

On 10 April 1933, just six weeks after the National Socialists came to power, Furtwängler wrote a public letter to Goebbels to denounce the new rulers' antisemitism:

Ultimately there is only one dividing line I recognize: that between good and bad art. However, while the dividing line between Jews and non-Jews is being drawn with a downright merciless theoretical precision, that other dividing line, the one which in the long run is so important for our music life, yes, the decisive dividing line between good and bad, seems to have far too little significance attributed to it.

If concerts offer nothing then people will not attend; that is why the QUALITY is not just an idea: it is of vital importance. If the fight against Judaism concentrates on those artists who are themselves rootless and destructive and who seek to succeed in kitsch, sterile virtuosity and the like, then it is quite acceptable; the fight against these people and the attitude they embody (as, unfortunately, do many non-Jews) cannot be pursued thoroughly or systematically enough. If, however, this campaign is also directed at truly great artists, then it ceases to be in the interests of Germany's cultural life.

It must therefore be stated that men such as Walter, Klemperer, Reinhardt etc. must be allowed to exercise their talents in Germany in the future as well, in exactly the same way as Kreisler, Huberman, Schnabel and other great instrumentalists of the Jewish race. It is only just that we Germans should bear in mind that in the past we had Joseph Joachim one of the greatest violinists and teachers in the German classical tradition, and in Mendelssohn even a great German composer – for Mendelssohn is a part of Germany's musical history."

As stated by the historian Fred K. Prieberg, this letter proved that if the concepts of nation and patriotism had a deep meaning for him, "it is clear that race meant nothing to him". In June 1933, for a text which was to be the basis for a discussion with Goebbels, Furtwängler went further, writing, "The Jewish question in musical spheres: a race of brilliant people!" He threatened that if boycotts against Jews were extended to artistic activities, he would resign all his posts immediately, concluding that "at any rate to continue giving concerts would be quite impossible without [the Jews] – to remove them would be an operation which would result in the death of the patient.

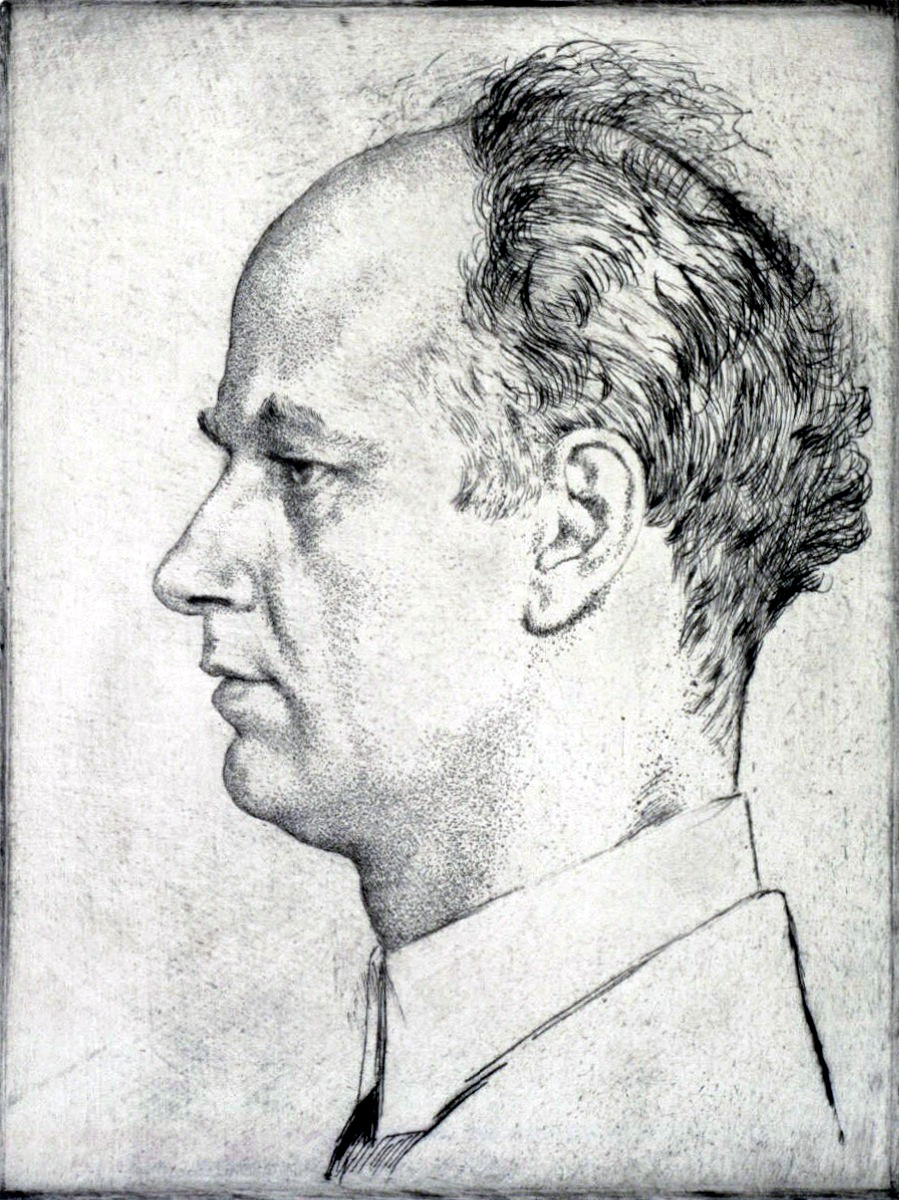
Etching of Furtwängler from 1928

Because of his high profile, Furtwängler's public opposition prompted a mixed reaction from the Nazi leadership. Heinrich Himmler wished to send Furtwängler to a concentration camp. Goebbels and Göring ordered their administration to listen to Furtwängler's requests and to give him the impression that they would do what he asked. This led him to believe that he had some positive influence to stop the racial policy. He subsequently invited several Jewish and anti-fascist artists (such as Yehudi Menuhin, Artur Schnabel, and Pablo Casals) to perform as soloists in his 1933/34 season, but they refused to come to Nazi Germany. Furtwängler subsequently invited Jewish musicians from his orchestra such as Szymon Goldberg to play as soloists.

The Gestapo built a case against Furtwängler, noting that he was providing assistance to Jews. Furtwängler gave all his fees to German emigrants during his concerts outside Germany. The German literary scholar Hans Mayer was one of these emigrants. Mayer later observed that for performances of Wagner operas in Paris prior to the war, Furtwängler cast only German emigrants (Jews or political opponents to the Nazis) to sing. Georg Gerullis, a director at the Ministry of Culture remarked in a letter to Goebbels, "Can you name me a Jew on whose behalf Furtwängler has not intervened?"

As Nazi Germany increased the persecution of Jews, Jewish musicians were forced out of work and began to leave Germany. The Nazis were aware that Furtwängler was opposed to the policies and might also decide to go abroad, so the Berlin Philharmonic, which employed many Jews, was exempted from the policies. In 1933, when Bruno Walter was dismissed from his position as principal conductor of the Leipzig Gewandhaus Orchestra, the Nazis asked Furtwängler to replace him for an international tour. Their goal was to show to the world that Germany did not need Jewish musicians. Furtwängler refused, and it was Richard Strauss who replaced Walter.

Furtwängler never joined the Nazi Party. He refused to give the Nazi salute, to conduct the Horst-Wessel-Lied, or to sign his letters with "Heil Hitler", even those he wrote to Hitler. Prieberg has found all the letters from the conductor to the dictator: these are always requests for an audience to defend Jewish musicians or musicians considered to be "degenerate". The fact that he refused to sign them "Heil Hitler" was considered a major affront by the Nazi leadership and explains why many of these requests for a hearing were refused. Furtwängler was, however, appointed as the first vice-president of the Reichsmusikkammer and Staatsrat of Prussia, and accepted these honorary positions to try to bend the racial policy of Nazis in music and to support Jewish musicians.

For concerts in London and Paris before the war, Furtwängler refused to conduct the Nazi anthems or to play music in halls adorned with swastikas. During the universal exposition held in Paris in 1937, a picture of the German delegation was taken in front of the Arc de Triomphe. In the picture, Furtwängler is the only German not giving the Nazi salute (he has his hand on his shoulder). This picture was suppressed at the time. The photo was, however, carefully preserved by the Gestapo, providing new proof that Furtwängler was opposed to Nazi policy.

=== 1933 Mannheim concert ===
On 26 April 1933, Furtwängler and the Berlin Philharmonic performed a joint concert in Mannheim with the local orchestra to commemorate the 50th anniversary of Wagner's death and raise funds for the Mannheim orchestra. The concert had been planned long before the Nazis came to power. However, the Nazi-controlled Mannheim Orchestra Committee demanded that Szymon Goldberg, the Jewish leader of the Berlin Philharmonic, step aside for the evening to allow the leader of the Mannheim orchestra to take his place. Furtwängler firmly refused, and the concert proceeded as originally scheduled.

Before the banquet organized for the evening, members of the Mannheim Orchestra Committee confronted Furtwängler, accusing him of "a lack of national sentiment." Furious, Furtwängler left the venue before the banquet and rejoined Berta Geissmar and her mother. His decision to spend the evening with his "Jewish friends" rather than attending the event hosted by the Nazi authorities sparked significant controversy. In protest, Furtwängler refused to conduct in Mannheim again, and it was not until 21 years later, in 1954, that he returned to the city.

=== "The Hindemith Case" ===
In 1934, Furtwängler publicly described Hitler as an "enemy of the human race" and the political situation in Germany as a Schweinerei ("disgrace", literally: "swinishness").

On 25 November 1934, he wrote a letter in the Deutsche Allgemeine Zeitung, "Der Fall Hindemith" ("The Hindemith Case"), in support of the composer Paul Hindemith. Hindemith had been labelled a degenerate artist by the Nazis. Furtwängler also conducted a piece by Hindemith, Mathis der Maler, although the work had been banned by the Nazis. The concert received enormous acclaim and unleashed a political storm. The Nazis (especially Alfred Rosenberg, the Nazi Party's chief racial theorist) formed a violent conspiracy against the conductor, who resigned from his official positions, including as the vice-president of the Reichsmusikkammer and as a member of the Prussian State Council. His resignation from the latter position was refused by Göring. He was also forced by Goebbels to give up all his artistic positions.

Furtwängler decided to leave Germany, but the Nazis prevented him. They seized the opportunity to Aryanise the orchestra and its administrative staff. Most of the Jewish musicians of the orchestra had already left the country and found positions outside Germany, with Furtwängler's assistance.

The main target of the Nazis was Berta Geissmar. She wrote in her book about Furtwängler that she was so close to the conductor that the Nazis had begun an investigation to know if she was his mistress. After being harassed for a period of two years, she moved to London when she became Sir Thomas Beecham's main assistant. In the book she wrote on Furtwängler in England in 1943, she said:

Furtwängler, although he had decided to remain in Germany, was certainly no Nazi.... He had a private telephone line to me which was not connected via the exchange ... Before going to bed, he used to chat with me over telephone. Sometimes I told him amusing stories to cheer him up, sometimes we talked about politics. One of the main threats the Nazis used against Furtwängler and myself later on was the assertion that they had recorded all these conversations. I should not have thought that it was possible! Was there enough shellac? If the Nazis really did this, their ears must certainly have burnt, and it was not surprising that Furtwängler was eventually put on their black list, let alone myself.

Goebbels refused to meet Furtwängler to clarify his situation for several months. During the same period, many members of the orchestra and of his public were begging him not to emigrate and desert them. In addition, Goebbels sent him a clear signal that if he left Germany he would never be allowed back, frightening him with the prospect of permanent separation from his mother (to whom he was very close) and his children. Furtwängler considered himself responsible for the Berlin Philharmonic and for his family, and decided to stay.

=== Compromise of 1935 ===
On 28 February 1935, Furtwängler met Goebbels, who wanted to keep Furtwängler in Germany, since he considered him, like Richard Strauss and Hans Pfitzner, a "national treasure". Goebbels asked him to pledge allegiance publicly to the new regime. Furtwängler refused. Goebbels then proposed that Furtwängler acknowledge publicly that Hitler was in charge of cultural policy. Furtwängler accepted: Hitler was a dictator and controlled everything in the country. But he added that it must be clear that he wanted nothing to do with the policy and that he would remain as a non-political artist, without any official position. The agreement was reached. Goebbels made an announcement declaring that Furtwängler's letter on Hindemith was not political: Furtwängler had spoken only from an artistic point of view, and it was Hitler who was in charge of the cultural policy in Germany.

Goebbels did not reveal the second part of the deal. However, the agreement between them was largely respected. At his subsequent denazification trial, Furtwängler was charged with conducting only two official concerts for the period 1933–1945. Furtwängler appeared in only two short propaganda films.

Other Nazi leaders were not satisfied with the compromise, since they believed that Furtwängler had not capitulated: Rosenberg demanded in vain that Furtwängler apologise to the regime. Goebbels, who wanted to keep Furtwängler in Germany, wrote in his diary that he was satisfied with the deal and remarked on "the incredible naïvety of artists".

Hitler now allowed him to have a new passport. When they met again in April, Hitler attacked Furtwängler for his support of modern music, and made him withdraw from regular conducting for the time being, save for his scheduled appearance at Bayreuth. However, Hitler confirmed that Furtwängler would not be given any official titles, and would be treated as a private individual. But Hitler refused Furtwängler's request to announce this, saying that it would be harmful for the "prestige of the State".

Furtwängler resumed conducting. On 25 April 1935, he returned to the Berlin Philharmonic with a program dedicated to Beethoven. Many people who had boycotted the orchestra during his absence came to the concert to support him. He was called out seventeen times. On 3 May, in his dressing room before conducting the same program, he was informed that Hitler and his entire staff would attend the concert. He was given the order to welcome Hitler with the Nazi salute. Furtwängler was so furious that he ripped the wooden panelling off a radiator. Franz Jastrau, the manager of the orchestra, suggested that he keep his baton in his right hand all the time. When he entered the hall, all the Nazi leaders were present making the Hitler salute, but Furtwängler kept hold of his baton and began the concert immediately. Hitler probably could not have imagined that such an affront was possible but decided to put up a good show: he sat down and the concert went on.

At the end of the concert, Furtwängler continued to keep his baton in his right hand. Hitler understood the situation and jumped up and demonstratively held out his right hand to him. The same situation occurred during another concert later on, when a photographer had been mobilized by the Nazis for the occasion: the photo of the famous handshake between Furtwängler and Hitler was distributed everywhere by Goebbels. Goebbels had obtained what he desired: to keep Furtwängler in Germany and to give the impression to those who were not well informed (especially outside the country) that Furtwängler was now a supporter of the regime.

Furtwängler wrote in his diary in 1935 that there was a complete contradiction between the racial ideology of the Nazis and the true German culture, the one of Schiller, Goethe and Beethoven. He added in 1936: "living today is more than ever a question of courage".

=== New York Philharmonic ===
In September 1935, the baritone Oskar Jölli, a member of the Nazi party, reported to the Gestapo that Furtwängler had said, "Those in power should all be shot, and things in Germany would not change until this was done". Hitler forbade him to conduct for several months, until Furtwängler's fiftieth birthday in January 1936. Hitler and Goebbels allowed him to conduct again and offered him presents: Hitler an annual pension of 40,000 Reichsmarks, and Goebbels an ornate baton made of gold and ivory. Furtwängler refused them.

Furtwängler was offered the principal conductor's post at the New York Philharmonic, which was then the most desirable and best paid position in international musical life. He was to have followed Arturo Toscanini, who had declared that Furtwängler was the only man to succeed him. Furtwängler accepted the post, but his telephone conversations were recorded by the Gestapo.

While Furtwängler was travelling, the Berlin branch of the Associated Press leaked a news story on Hermann Göring's orders. It suggested Furtwängler would probably be reappointed as director of the Berlin State Opera and of the Berlin Philharmonic. This caused the mood in New York to turn against him: it seemed that Furtwängler was now a supporter of the Nazi Party. On reading the American press reaction, Furtwängler chose not to accept the position in New York. Nor did he accept any position at the Berlin Opera.

=== 1936 to 1937 ===
Furtwängler consistently included Jewish and other non-Aryan musicians in his overseas tours during the 1930s, even as the Nazi regime tightened its grip. This was evident during his performances in France in April 1934, where he conducted Wagner operas. Hans Mayer, a professor of literature and a communist Jew who had fled Germany, reported after the war that Furtwängler had deliberately chosen a cast made up almost entirely of Jews or individuals who had been driven out of Germany for these concerts.

Similarly, during the Universal Exhibition in Paris in 1937, Furtwängler held a series of Wagnerian concerts that were hailed as a triumph. Goebbels proclaimed in the German press that Furtwängler and Wagner had been celebrated in Paris. However, the true source of this acclaim was the German émigré community in Paris, many of whom were Jewish and viewed Furtwängler as a symbol of anti-Nazi resistance.

Furtwängler also took a firm stand against Nazi symbols and practices. He refused to conduct the Nazi anthem, Horst-Wessel-Lied, and insisted that all swastikas be removed from his concert halls. The Nazis eventually realized that Furtwängler was not generating revenue for the regime from his overseas tours. Initially, they believed he was spending the money on himself, but they later discovered that he was giving all the proceeds to support German emigrants. After the war, it was confirmed that Furtwängler had donated "to the last penny" to help those in need when he met them.

Despite the regime's expectations, Furtwängler consistently refused to perform the Nazi salute or conduct the Nazi anthem. When the Berlin Philharmonic performed abroad during 1935–1939, Furtwängler was often replaced by the steward Hans von Benda at the start of the concert to perform the Nazi anthem. Furtwängler would only enter the room afterward, a silent but powerful statement of his defiance.

In 1936, Furtwängler returned to the Bayreuth Festival for the first time since 1931, despite his strained relationship with Winifred Wagner. That year, he conducted a new staging of Lohengrin, the first performance of this work at the festival since 1909. Hitler ensured that no expense was spared for the production, with costume and set designs on a scale larger and more extravagant than anything previously seen at Bayreuth. The performance was broadcast across Europe and the Americas, serving as a key element of a propaganda campaign designed to portray the 'New Germany' as the rightful heir to the German musical tradition—a narrative in which Furtwängler's presence at the podium played a central role. Both Hitler and Goebbels attended the festival and made efforts to pressure Furtwängler into accepting an official position within the Nazi regime. Friedelind Wagner, the composer's anti-Nazi granddaughter, witnessed a meeting between Hitler and Furtwängler at her mother's Bayreuth home:

I remember Hitler turning to Furtwängler and telling him that he would now have to allow himself to be used by the party for propaganda purposes, and I remember that Furtwängler refused categorically. Hitler flew into a fury and told Furtwängler that in that case there would be a concentration camp ready for him. Furtwängler quietly replied: "In that case, Herr Reichskanzler, at least I will be in very good company." Hitler couldn't even answer, and vanished from the room.

Furtwängler avoided the 1936 Summer Olympics in Berlin, and canceled all his public engagements during the following winter season in order to compose. He returned to the Berlin Philharmonic in 1937, performing with them in London for the coronation of George VI, and in Paris for the universal exposition, where he again refused to conduct the Horst-Wessel-Lied or to attend the political speeches of German officials.

The Salzburg Festival was considered to be a festival of the "free world" and a centre for anti-fascist artists. Hitler had forbidden all German musicians from performing there. In 1937, Furtwängler was asked to conduct Beethoven's Ninth Symphony in Salzburg. Despite strong opposition from Hitler and Goebbels, he accepted the invitation.

Arturo Toscanini, a prominent anti-fascist, was furious to learn that Furtwängler would be at the festival. He accepted his engagement in Salzburg on the condition that he would not have to meet Furtwängler. But the two did meet, and argued over Furtwängler's actions. Toscanini argued: "I know quite well that you are not a member of the Party. I am also aware that you have helped your Jewish friends ... But everyone who conducts in the Third Reich is a Nazi!" Furtwängler emphatically denied this and said: "By that, you imply that art and music are merely propaganda, a false front, as it were, for any Government which happens to be in power. If a Nazi Government is in power, then, as a conductor, I am a Nazi; under the communists, I would be a Communist; under the democrats, a democrat... No, a thousand times no! Music belongs to a different world, and is above chance political events." Toscanini disagreed and that ended the discussion.

Furtwängler returned to the Bayreuth Festival, his relationship with Winifred Wagner worse than ever. He did not appear again in Bayreuth until 1943. He wrote a letter to Winifred Wagner, sending copies to Hitler, Göring and Goebbels, accusing her of having betrayed Wagner's heritage by applying racial and not artistic rules in the choice of the artists, and of putting her "trust in the powers of an authoritarian state". This clear attack on Hitler caused a sharp reaction: Hitler wanted to drop Furtwängler from Bayreuth after all. Goebbels wrote in two entries of his diary in 1937 that Furtwängler was constantly helping Jews, "half-Jews" and "his small Hindemith".

According to the historian Fred Prieberg, by the end of 1937 nobody who was correctly informed could accuse Furtwängler of working for the Nazis.

=== Herbert von Karajan ===
The Nazi leaders searched for another conductor to counterbalance Furtwängler. A young, gifted Austrian conductor now appeared in Nazi Germany: Herbert von Karajan. Karajan had been a member of the Nazi Party since 1935, and was much more willing to participate in the propaganda of the new regime than Furtwängler.

Furtwängler had attended several of Karajan's concerts, praising his technical abilities but criticizing his conducting style. At the time, Furtwängler did not view Karajan as a serious competitor. However, this perception changed when Karajan conducted Fidelio and Tristan und Isolde in Berlin in late 1938. Göring, recognizing an opportunity, decided to take the initiative.

The music critic Edwin von der Nüll, with Göring's support, wrote a review of these concerts in the Berliner Zeitung am Mittag titled "The Karajan Miracle" ("Das Wunder Karajan"), a deliberate reference to the famous article "The Furtwängler Miracle" that had catapulted Furtwängler to fame as a young conductor in Mannheim. Von der Nüll enthusiastically championed Karajan, declaring, "A thirty-year-old man creates a performance for which our great fifty-year-olds can justifiably envy him." To drive the comparison home, Furtwängler's photograph was printed alongside the article, making the reference unmistakable.

The article was part of a broader campaign targeting Furtwängler. The Nazi press denounced him as "a man of the nineteenth century" with outdated political ideas, accusing him of failing to understand and accept the "new order" in Germany. The relentless criticism became unbearable for Furtwängler. To address the situation, he obtained a pledge from Goebbels to put an end to the attacks.

However, the episode significantly weakened Furtwängler's position. He realized that if he were to leave Germany, Karajan would immediately be appointed conductor of the Berlin Philharmonic. This realization marked the beginning of an intense and enduring hatred and contempt for Karajan, which persisted until Furtwängler's death. He often refused to refer to Karajan by name, instead calling him simply "Herr K."

Hitler, for his part, expressed the opinion that while Furtwängler might be the better conductor, it was essential to keep Karajan "in reserve." This was because Furtwängler was deemed "not politically trustworthy."

=== Kristallnacht and the Anschluss ===
Furtwängler was deeply affected by the events of Kristallnacht. Berta Geissmar, who encountered him in Paris, described him as "greatly depressed." Friedelind Wagner, who also saw him in Paris, wrote that he appeared to be "a very unhappy man." Andrew Schulhof, who met him in Budapest, recalled that Furtwängler "had the impression that what he had done before for his Jewish friends had been lost."

Furtwängler initially approved of the Anschluss, which occurred on 12 March 1938. However, he quickly opposed the Nazi leaders' decision to "annex Austrian culture," which involved abolishing independent cultural activity in Austria and subordinating it to Berlin. Shortly after the Anschluss, Furtwängler discovered that a massive Swastika flag had been displayed in the hall of the Musikverein. Outraged, he refused to conduct the Vienna Philharmonic, declaring, "as long as the rag is visible." His stance eventually led to the flag being removed.

Goebbels sought to dismantle the Vienna Philharmonic and transform the Vienna Opera and the Salzburg Festival into subsidiaries of the Berlin Opera and the Bayreuth Festival, respectively. Additionally, he aimed to confiscate the world's largest musical collection, housed by the Gesellschaft der Musikfreunde in Vienna, and relocate it to Berlin. Hitler's ultimate goal was to erase the notion that Austria had developed its own distinct cultural identity, separate from Germany. In response, Austrian musical circles turned to Furtwängler, who served as the honorary president of the Vienna Gesellschaft der Musikfreunde, urging him to help protect their heritage.

Furtwängler actively campaigned to convince Nazi leaders to abandon their plans to dismantle Austrian cultural institutions. According to historian Fred K. Prieberg, he conducted concerts—often with the Vienna Philharmonic—in the presence of German leaders during this period, using his performances as leverage to secure the conservation of the orchestra. He also organized several concerts featuring Austrian music in both Berlin and Vienna specifically for Hitler, aiming to highlight and preserve Austrian cultural identity.

The Nazi leadership, seeking to exploit this situation, invited Furtwängler in 1938 to conduct Die Meistersinger von Nürnberg with the Vienna Philharmonic in Nürnberg as part of the Nazi Party Congress. Furtwängler agreed on the condition that the performance would not take place during the congress itself. Hitler ultimately accepted Furtwängler's terms: the concert was held on 5 September, with the political event formally opening the following morning.

This concert, along with another he conducted in Berlin in 1942 for Hitler's birthday, led to significant criticism of Furtwängler after the war. However, Furtwängler had successfully avoided participating in the Party Congress itself. Moreover, he had managed to preserve the Vienna Philharmonic, as well as the musical collections of Vienna and the Vienna Opera. Through his efforts, he persuaded Hitler and Goebbels to approve the appointment of Karl Böhm as artistic director of the Vienna Opera.

At both the Vienna and Berlin Philharmonics, Furtwängler worked to protect "half-Jews" or members with "non-Aryan" wives until the end of the war—an extraordinary achievement given the pervasive anti-Semitism of the Nazi regime. However, he was unable to save the lives of "full-blooded" Jews, many of whom were persecuted and perished in concentration camps.

Goebbels was pleased with Furtwängler's conduct of concerts in Vienna, Prague, and Nürnberg, viewing these performances as providing a 'cultural' justification for the annexation of Austria and Czechoslovakia. During this period, Goebbels remarked that Furtwängler was "willing to place himself at my disposal for any of my activities," describing him as "an out-and-out chauvinist." However, Goebbels frequently lamented that Furtwängler continued to assist Jews and "half-Jews," a source of ongoing frustration throughout the war.

In his diary, Goebbels accused Furtwängler of attempting to undermine Nazi cultural policy. For example, he wrote that Furtwängler supported the Salzburg Festival as a counterbalance to the Bayreuth Festival, which was a cornerstone of the Nazi regime's cultural propaganda.

Furtwängler was deeply affected by the events of the 1930s. Fred K. Prieberg describes him in 1939 as a "broken man." That same year, the French government awarded him the Legion of Honour, which has led some to speculate that Western diplomatic services were aware of Furtwängler's opposition to the Nazi regime. In response, Hitler ordered that news of the award be suppressed within Germany.

=== World War II ===
During the war, Furtwängler tried to avoid conducting in occupied Europe. He said: "I will never play in a country such as France, which I am so much attached to, considering myself a 'vanquisher'. I will conduct there again only when the country has been liberated". He refused to go to France during its occupation, although the Nazis tried to force him to conduct there. Since he had said that he would conduct there only at the invitation of the French, Goebbels forced the French conductor Charles Munch to send him a personal invitation. But Munch wrote in small characters at the bottom of his letter "in agreement with the German occupation authorities." Furtwängler declined the invitation.

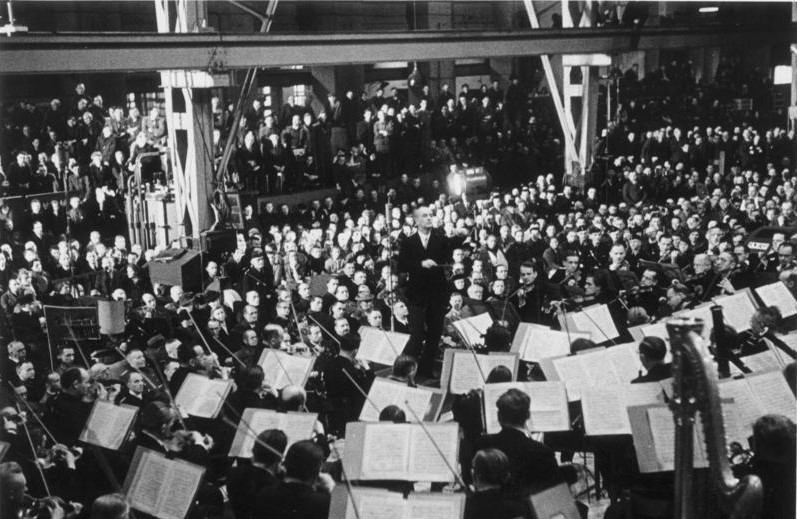
Furtwängler conducting the Berlin Philharmonic in a "work-break" concert at AEG in February 1942, organized by the Nazi Strength Through Joy program

Furtwängler did conduct in Prague in November 1940 and March 1944. The 1940 program, chosen by Furtwängler, included Smetana's Moldau. According to Prieberg, "This piece is part of the cycle in which the Czech master celebrated Má vlast (My Country), and ... was intended to support his compatriots' fight for the independence from Austrian domination ... When Furtwängler began with the 'Moldau' it was not a deliberate risk, but a statement of his stance towards the oppressed Czechs". The 1944 concert marked the fifth anniversary of the German occupation and was the result of a deal between Furtwängler and Goebbels: Furtwängler did not want to perform in April for Hitler's birthday in Berlin. He said to Goebbels in March (as he had in April 1943) that he was sick. Goebbels asked him to perform in Prague instead, where he conducted the Symphony No. 9 of Antonín Dvořák. He conducted in Oslo in 1943, where he helped the Jewish conductor Issay Dobrowen to flee to Sweden.

In April 1942, Furtwängler conducted Beethoven's Ninth Symphony with the Berlin Philharmonic as part of Hitler's birthday celebrations. At least the final minutes of the performance were filmed and can still be viewed on YouTube. At the conclusion of the concert, Joseph Goebbels approached the stage to shake Furtwängler's hand. This event led to significant criticism of Furtwängler after the war.

In fact, Furtwängler had planned to conduct several concerts in Vienna during this period to avoid participating in Hitler's birthday festivities. However, following the German army's defeat during the Battle of Moscow, Goebbels decided to deliver a lengthy speech on the eve of Hitler's birthday to rally the German nation. The speech was to be followed by a performance of Beethoven's Ninth Symphony, which Goebbels wanted Furtwängler to conduct to lend a transcendent dimension to the event. Shortly before the performance, Goebbels called Furtwängler and urged him to agree to conduct, but Furtwängler refused, citing a lack of time to rehearse and his prior commitments to perform in Vienna.

Enraged, Goebbels used threats and intimidation to force the organizers in Vienna to cancel the concerts, with some even being physically assaulted by the Nazis. Furtwängler was then ordered to return to Berlin to conduct the symphony. Determined to prevent such situations in the future, Furtwängler began providing false medical certificates in advance during 1943 and 1944 to ensure he would not be compelled to participate in similar events.

It is now known that Furtwängler continued to use his influence to help Jewish musicians and non-musicians escape Nazi Germany. He managed to have Max Zweig, a nephew of conductor Fritz Zweig, released from Dachau concentration camp. Others, from an extensive list of Jews he helped, included Carl Flesch, Josef Krips and the composer Arnold Schoenberg.

Furtwängler refused to participate in the propaganda film Philharmoniker. Goebbels wanted Furtwängler to feature in it, but Furtwängler declined to take part. The film was finished in December 1943 showing many conductors connected with the Berlin Philharmonic, including Eugen Jochum, Karl Böhm, Hans Knappertsbusch, and Richard Strauss, but not Furtwängler. Goebbels also asked Furtwängler to direct the music in a film about Beethoven, again for propaganda purposes. They quarrelled violently about this project. Furtwängler told him "You are wrong, Herr Minister, if you think you can exploit Beethoven in a film." Goebbels gave up his plans for the film.

In April 1944, Goebbels wrote:

Furtwängler has never been a National Socialist. Nor has he ever made any bones about it, which Jews and emigrants thought was sufficient to consider him as one of them, a key representative of so-called 'inner emigration'. Furtwängler['s] stance towards us has not changed in the least.

Friedelind Wagner, a vocal opponent of the Nazis, recounted a conversation with her mother, Winifred Wagner, a staunch supporter of Hitler and a close friend of his. During the war, Friedelind reported that Hitler neither trusted nor liked Furtwängler, and that both Göring and Goebbels were frustrated by Furtwängler's continued support for his 'undesirable friends.' Despite this, Hitler, in recognition of Furtwängler's refusal to leave Berlin even as it came under bombardment, ordered Albert Speer to construct a special air raid shelter for the conductor and his family. Furtwängler declined the offer, but Speer went ahead and built the shelter in the house against Furtwängler's wishes.

Speer later revealed that in December 1944, Furtwängler asked him whether Germany had any chance of winning the war. Speer responded in the negative and advised Furtwängler to flee to Switzerland to avoid potential Nazi retribution. In 1944, Furtwängler stood apart as the only prominent German artist to refuse to sign the brochure "We Stand and Fall with Adolf Hitler".

Furtwängler's name appeared on the Gottbegnadeten list ('God-Gifted List') of September 1944 as one of only three musicians in the special category designated as unersetzliche Künstler ("indispensable artists"), alongside Richard Strauss and Hans Pfitzner. However, he was removed from the list on 7 December 1944 due to his connections with the German resistance, which had organized the 20 July plot. During his denazification trial, Furtwängler stated that while he was aware of the plot to assassinate Hitler, he did not play a role in its organization. He had a close relationship with Claus von Stauffenberg, one of the key conspirators, and his doctor, Johannes Ludwig Schmitt, who provided him with numerous false health prescriptions to circumvent official requirements, was a member of the Kreisau Circle.

Furtwängler's concerts were occasionally chosen by members of the German resistance as meeting points. Rudolf Pechel, a member of the resistance group behind the 20 July plot, remarked to Furtwängler after the war: "In the circle of our resistance movement, it was an accepted fact that you were the only one in the whole of our musical world who really resisted, and you were one of us." Graf Kaunitz, another member of the circle, echoed this sentiment, stating: "In Furtwängler's concerts, we were one big family of the resistance."

Furtwängler was "within a few hours of being arrested" by the Gestapo when he fled to Switzerland, following a concert in Vienna with the Vienna Philharmonic on 28 January 1945. The Nazis had begun to crack down on German liberals. At the concert he conducted Brahms's Second Symphony, which was recorded and is considered one of his greatest performances.

=== After World War II ===
Furtwängler in 1950s

In February 1946, Furtwängler met Curt Riess, a German Jew who had fled Germany in 1933, in Vienna. Riess, a musician, writer, and journalist, later authored a book about Furtwängler. At the time, Riess was working as a correspondent for American newspapers in Switzerland. Initially, he viewed Furtwängler as a Nazi collaborator and opposed his conducting in Switzerland in 1945. However, when Furtwängler requested a meeting, Riess thoroughly examined the documents related to Furtwängler's case. This led to a complete change of heart: Riess realized that Furtwängler had never been a Nazi and had, in fact, helped many people of Jewish origin. Riess subsequently became Furtwängler's "denazification advisor" and devoted the next two years to securing his exoneration. As Roger Smithson concludes in his article 'Furtwängler's Silent Years (1945–1947)': "Ultimately Furtwängler's return to conducting was very largely the result of skill and stubbornness of Curt Riess. Furtwängler's admirers owe him a great debt."

Furtwängler initially suggested that Riess write articles about him based on the extensive documentation he had provided, leveraging Riess's background as a journalist. However, Riess preferred to take a more direct approach and met with General Robert A. McClure, who was responsible for Furtwängler's case. After reviewing the documents, which had been translated into English, and meeting with Riess, General McClure concluded that no serious charges could be brought against Furtwängler. He acknowledged that the conductor had been the subject of a mistake and described him as 'a very good man.' McClure requested that Riess advise Furtwängler not to speak to the press, as it might create the impression that pressure was being exerted on the Allied forces. He assured Riess that the case would be resolved within weeks. Although Riess sent a telegram to Furtwängler conveying this message, it arrived too late, having been delayed en route.

In the meantime, Furtwängler made a serious misstep by traveling to Berlin, which was under Soviet occupation at the time. The Soviets welcomed him as a head of state, as they sought to recruit the man described by Arsenyi Gouliga, the Soviet representative at Furtwängler's trial, as the "greatest conductor in the world" to lead a grand cultural initiative in Berlin. Specifically, they offered him the position of director of the Berlin State Opera, located in the Soviet zone. This development forced General Robert A. McClure to subject Furtwängler to the standard denazification process. McClure explained to Curt Riess, via telephone, that bypassing the procedure would create the impression that the Americans were conceding to the Soviets on Furtwängler's case. Although the American authorities were confident that the conductor would be cleared by the denazification court, the Soviet authorities dismissed the trial as "ridiculous" and meaningless. Against this backdrop of Cold War tensions, Furtwängler, who was determined to reclaim leadership of the Berlin Philharmonic in the British occupation zone, was compelled to undergo the denazification process.

Furtwängler was thus required to undergo the denazification process. The charges against him were relatively minor. He was accused of conducting two official Nazi concerts during the period 1933–1945. Furtwängler countered by stating that these two concerts, which he claimed were "extorted" from him, had allowed him to avoid conducting sixty others. The first concert took place on 3 February 1938 for the Hitler Youth. It was presented to Furtwängler as an opportunity to introduce younger generations to classical music. However, as Fred Prieberg recounts: "When he looked at the audience, he realized that this was more than just a concert for schoolchildren in uniform; a whole collection of prominent political figures were sitting there as well... and it was the last time he raised his baton for this purpose."

The second concert was the performance of Wagner's Die Meistersinger von Nürnberg with the Vienna Philharmonic on 5 September 1938, on the evening before the Nazi congress in Nüremberg. Furtwängler had agreed to conduct this concert to help preserve the Vienna Philharmonic, and at his insistence the concert was not part of the congress.

He was charged for his honorary title of "Prussian State Counselor" (German: Preußischer Staatsrat) (he had resigned from this title in 1934, but the Nazis had refused his resignation) and with making an anti-Semitic remark against the part-Jewish conductor Victor de Sabata (see below). The chair of the commission, Alex Vogel, known for being a communist, started the trial with the following statement:

The investigations showed that Furtwängler had not been a member of any [Nazi] organization, that he tried to help people persecuted because of their race, and that he also avoided... formalities such as giving the Hitler salute.

The prosecution initially believed they had a stronger case when Hans von Benda, a former Nazi Party member and the artistic director of the Berlin Philharmonic during the Nazi era, expressed his willingness to testify against Furtwängler, accusing him of anti-Semitism. Von Benda claimed that during an argument with another German musician, he overheard Furtwängler say: "A Jew like Sabata cannot play Brahms' music." However, this accusation quickly unraveled. Furtwängler had frequently performed Brahms' music with Jewish musicians, particularly those in his own orchestra, making the claim either a mistake or a misunderstanding. It was far more likely that Furtwängler harbored no anti-Semitic feelings toward Sabata, who had been a close friend. Furthermore, Hans von Benda admitted that he had not been directly present when the alleged statement was made, which undermined the credibility of his testimony and led the prosecution to dismiss it.

The motivations behind von Benda's actions became clearer over time. He had been dismissed from his position as artistic director of the Berlin Philharmonic on 22 December 1939 due to numerous serious instances of professional misconduct. Von Benda likely saw the lawsuit as an opportunity to exact revenge on Furtwängler, whom he blamed for his dismissal, believing that Furtwängler had supported Karajan as his successor—a claim strongly contested by Furtwängler and his wife. However, historian Fred Prieberg later revealed that, contrary to von Benda's accusations, Furtwängler had consistently opposed Nazi policies and actively assisted Jews. In fact, Prieberg demonstrated that von Benda himself had secretly provided information to the Nazis, denouncing Furtwängler's efforts to help Jews and resist their policies.

Two key figures who prepared Furtwängler's defense for his denazification trial were Berta Geissmar and Curt Riess, both German Jews who had fled the Nazi regime. Their backgrounds, however, were vastly different. Berta Geissmar had known Furtwängler personally and had witnessed firsthand his actions during the early years of the Nazi period. She left Germany in 1936 but returned from exile to assist with his defense. In contrast, Curt Riess had no prior acquaintance with Furtwängler and initially held a very negative opinion of the conductor.

Geissmar meticulously compiled hundreds of files to support Furtwängler's case, including a list of over 80 Jewish and non-Jewish individuals who claimed to have been helped or saved by him. While the list was not exhaustive, it included cases for which Geissmar had found undeniable, concrete evidence. Among those Furtwängler had assisted were Communists, Social Democrats, and even former Nazis who had fallen out of favor with the regime. Geissmar sent these documents to General Robert A. McClure, who was overseeing the Furtwängler trial, but they mysteriously disappeared in Berlin while being transferred to the American occupation zone's authorities. Riess also searched unsuccessfully for the documents in Washington archives, leaving Furtwängler without a means to directly prove the extent of his assistance to others.

Despite this setback, three individuals of Jewish origin traveled to Berlin to testify at the trial. On 17 December 1946, the second day of proceedings, they attested to Furtwängler's bravery in risking his life to protect them. One of them was Paul Heizberg, a former opera director, and the other two were members of the Berlin Philharmonic. Hugo Strelitzer, one of the musicians, declared:

If I am alive today, I owe this to this great man. Furtwängler helped and protected a great number of Jewish musicians and this attitude shows a great deal of courage since he did it under the eyes of the Nazis, in Germany itself. History will be his judge.

As part of his closing remarks at his denazification trial, Furtwängler said:

I knew Germany was in a terrible crisis; I felt responsible for German music, and it was my task to survive this crisis, as much as I could. The concern that my art was misused for propaganda had to yield to the greater concern that German music be preserved, that music be given to the German people by its own musicians. These people, the compatriots of Bach and Beethoven, of Mozart and Schubert, still had to go on living under the control of a regime obsessed with total war. No one who did not live here himself in those days can possibly judge what it was like. Does Thomas Mann [who was critical of Furtwängler's actions] really believe that in 'the Germany of Himmler' one should not be permitted to play Beethoven? Could he not realize that people never needed more, never yearned more to hear Beethoven and his message of freedom and human love, than precisely these Germans, who had to live under Himmler's terror? I do not regret having stayed with them.

The prosecution itself acknowledging that no charge of anti-Semitism or sympathy for Nazi ideology could be brought against the conductor, Furtwängler was cleared on all the counts. Even after Furtwängler's acquittal at the denazification trials, Mann still criticized him for continuing to conduct in Germany and for believing that art could be apolitical in a regime such as Nazi Germany, which was so intent on using art as propaganda. In a drafted letter to the editor of Aufbau magazine, Mann praises Furtwängler for assisting Jewish musicians and as a "preeminent musician", but ultimately presents him as a representative example of a fatal "lack of understanding and lack of desire to understand what had seized power in Germany".

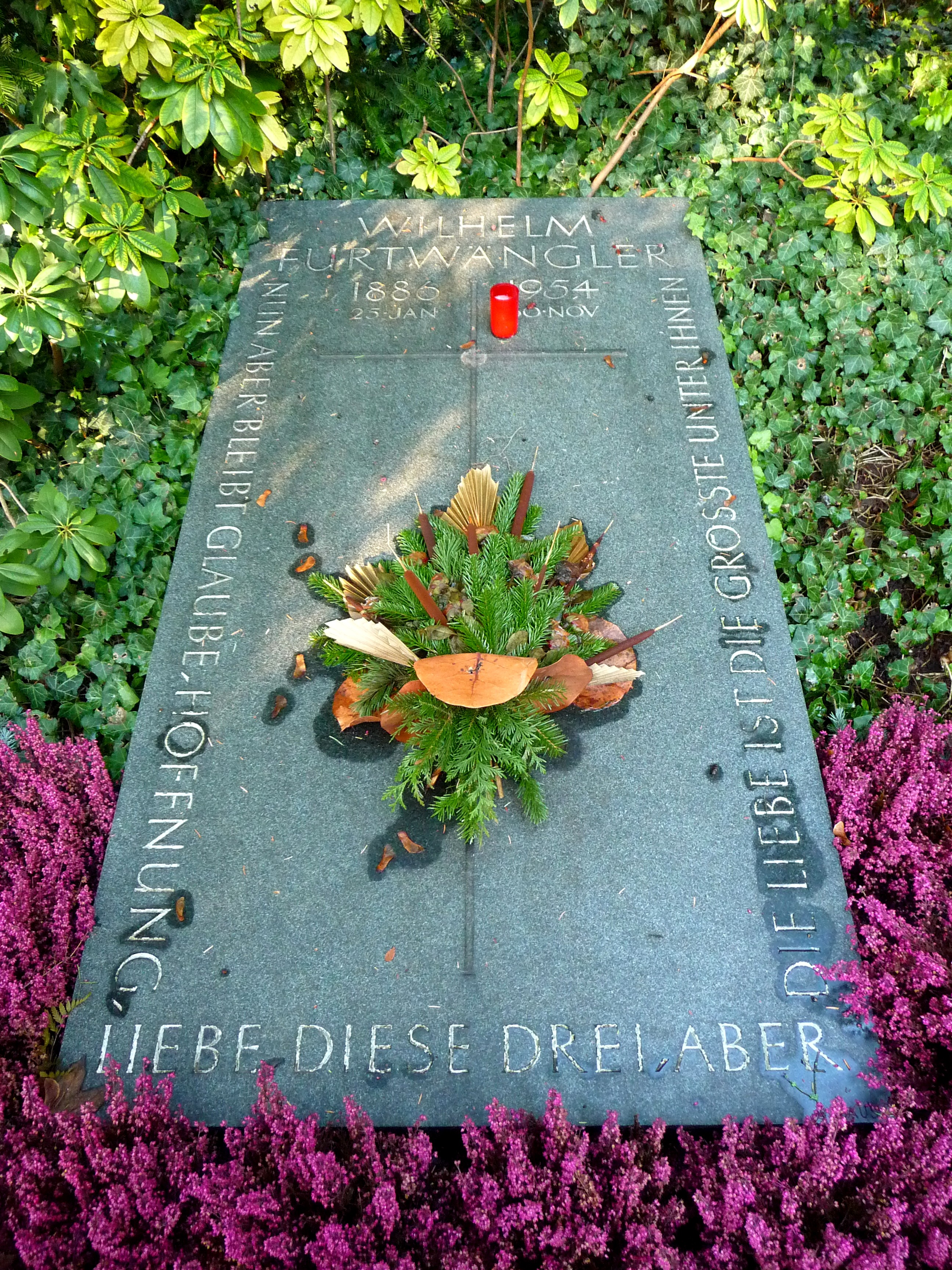
Furtwängler's tomb in Heidelberg

The violinist Yehudi Menuhin was, with Arnold Schoenberg, Bronisław Huberman, and Nathan Milstein, among the Jewish musicians who had a positive view of Furtwängler. In February 1946, he sent a wire to General Robert A. McClure in February 1946:

Unless you have secret incriminating evidence against Furtwängler supporting your accusation that he was a tool of Nazi Party, I beg to take violent issue with your decision to ban him. The man never was a Party member. Upon numerous occasions, he risked his own safety and reputation to protect friends and colleagues. Do not believe that the fact of remaining in one's own country is alone sufficient to condemn a man. On the contrary, as a military man, you would know that remaining at one's post often requires greater courage than running away. He saved, and for that we are deeply his debtors, the best part of his own German culture... I believe it patently unjust and most cowardly for us to make of Furtwängler a scapegoat for our own crimes.

In 1949 Furtwängler accepted the position of principal conductor of the Chicago Symphony Orchestra. However the orchestra was forced to rescind the offer under the threat of a boycott from several prominent musicians including Arturo Toscanini, George Szell, Vladimir Horowitz, Arthur Rubinstein, Isaac Stern, and Alexander Brailowsky.

According to a New York Times report, Horowitz said that he "was prepared to forgive the small fry who had no alternative but to remain and work in Germany." But Furtwängler "was out of the country on several occasions and could have elected to keep out". Rubinstein likewise wrote in a telegram, "Had Furtwängler been firm in his democratic convictions he would have left Germany". Yehudi Menuhin was upset with this boycott, declaring that some of the main organizers had admitted to him that they had organized it only to eliminate Furtwängler's presence in North America.

Furtwängler's career proceeded after the war, despite the loss of the position in Chicago. Sergiu Celibidache was appointed general music director of the Berlin Philharmonic immediately after the war, but in 1952, Furtwängler resumed this title, which he held until his death. Furtwängler also gave concerts elsewhere, some of which were recorded live. He also made studio recordings, for EMI and Deutsche Grammophon, during this period. Many of these recordings have been commercially released, but the extent of Furtwängler's studio and live discography is unclear and subject to debate.

Wilhelm Furtwängler died on 30 November 1954 of pneumonia, in Baden-Baden. He was buried in Heidelberg cemetery, the Bergfriedhof, in his mother's vault. A large number of personalities from the artistic and political world were present, including Chancellor Konrad Adenauer.

After Furtwängler's death, the Jewish writer and theater director Ernst Lothar said:

He was totally German and he remained so, despite the attacks. This is why he did not leave his defiled country, which was later counted to him as a stain by those who did not know him well enough. But he did not stay with Hitler and Himmler, but with Beethoven and Brahms.

At the end of his life, Yehudi Menuhin said of Furtwängler, "It was his greatness that attracted hatred".

== Conducting style ==
Furtwängler possessed a unique and deeply personal philosophy of music. He viewed symphonic works as creations of nature, which could only be realized subjectively through sound. Neville Cardus, writing in the Manchester Guardian in 1954, eloquently described Furtwängler’s conducting style: "He did not regard the printed notes of the score as a final statement, but rather as so many symbols of an imaginative conception, ever changing and always to be felt and realized subjectively..." Similarly, conductor Henry Lewis remarked: "I admire Furtwängler for his originality and honesty. He liberated himself from the slavery of the score; he understood that the notes printed on the page are nothing but SYMBOLS. The score is neither the essence nor the spirit of the music. Furtwängler had the rare and extraordinary gift of transcending the written notes to reveal the true essence of music."

Many commentators and critics regard him as the greatest conductor in history. Musicologist Walter Frisch, in his book on the symphonies of Johannes Brahms, describes Furtwängler as "the finest Brahms conductor of his generation, perhaps of all time." Frisch highlights Furtwängler’s recordings as demonstrating "at once a greater attention to detail and to Brahms' markings than his contemporaries, and at the same time a larger sense of rhythmic-temporal flow that is never deflected by individual nuances." He praises Furtwängler’s ability "not only to respect, but to make musical sense of, dynamic markings and the indications of crescendo and diminuendo."

Frisch concludes that Furtwängler possessed "the rare combination of a conductor who understands both sound and structure." He notes Vladimir Ashkenazy who says that his sound "is never rough. It's very weighty but at the same time is never heavy. In his fortissimo you always feel every voice.... I have never heard so beautiful a fortissimo in an orchestra", and Daniel Barenboim says he "had a subtlety of tone color that was extremely rare. His sound was always 'rounded,' and incomparably more interesting than that of the great German conductors of his generation."

On the other hand, the critic David Hurwitz sharply criticizes what he terms "the Furtwängler wackos" who "will forgive him virtually any lapse, no matter how severe", and characterizes the conductor himself as "occasionally incandescent but criminally sloppy". Unlike conductors such as Carlos Kleiber or Sergiu Celibidache, Furtwängler did not try to reach the perfection in details, and the number of rehearsals with him was small. He said:

I am told that the more you rehearse, the better you play. This is wrong. We often try to reduce the unforeseen to a controllable level, to prevent a sudden impulse that escapes our ability to control, yet also responds to an obscure desire. Let's allow improvisation to have its place and play its role. I think that the true interpreter is the one who improvises. We have mechanized the art of conducting to an awful degree, in the quest of perfection rather than of dream.

As soon as rubato is obtained and calculated scientifically, it ceases to be true. Music making is something else than searching to achieve an accomplishment. But striving to attain it is beautiful. Some of Michelangelo's sculptures are perfect, others are just outlined and the latter ones move me more than the first perfect ones because here I find the essence of desire, of the wakening dream. That's what really moves me: fixing without freezing in cement, allowing chance its opportunity.

His style is often contrasted with that of his contemporary Arturo Toscanini. He walked out of a Toscanini concert once, calling him "a mere time-beater!". Unlike Toscanini, Furtwängler sought a weighty, less rhythmically strict, more bass-oriented orchestral sound, with a more conspicuous use of tempo changes not indicated in the printed score. Instead of perfection in details, Furtwängler was looking for the spiritual in art. Sergiu Celibidache explained,

Everybody was influenced at the time by Arturo Toscanini – it was easy to understand what he was trying to do: you didn't need any reference to spiritual dimension. There was a certain order in the way the music was presented. With Toscanini I never felt anything spiritual. With Furtwängler on the other hand, I understood that there I was confronted by something completely different: metaphysics, transcendence, the relationship between sounds and sonorities ... Furtwängler was not only a musician, he was a creator ... Furtwängler had the ear for it: not the physical ear, but the spiritual ear that captures these parallel movements.

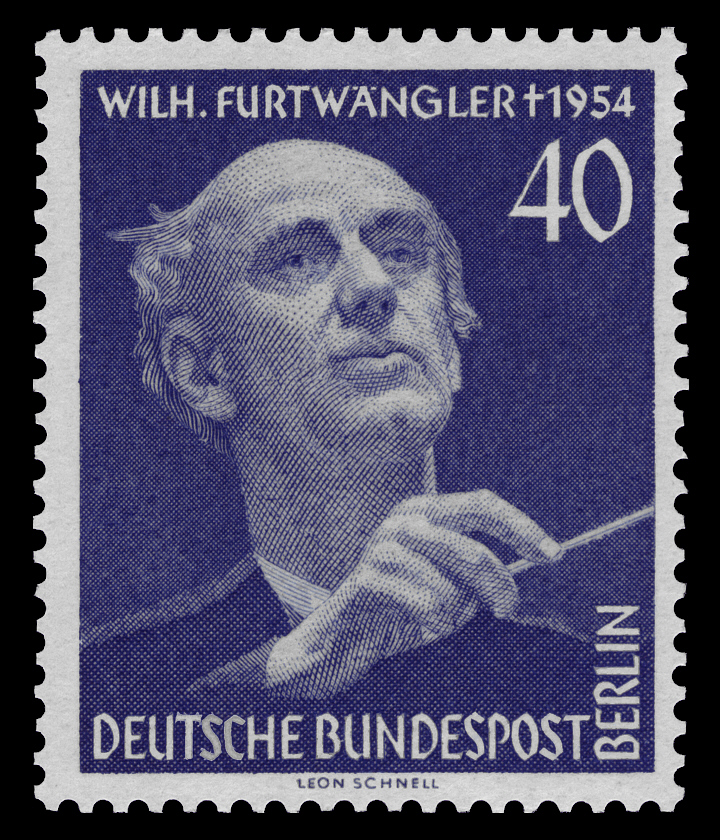
Furtwängler commemorated on a stamp for West Berlin, 1955

Furtwängler's art of conducting is considered the synthesis and the peak of the so-called "Germanic school of conducting". This "school" was initiated by Richard Wagner. Unlike Mendelssohn's conducting style, which was "characterized by quick, even tempos and imbued with what many people regarded as model logic and precision ..., Wagner's way was broad, hyper-romantic and embraced the idea of tempo modulation". Wagner considered an interpretation as a re-creation and put more emphasis on the phrase than on the measure.

The fact that the tempo was changing was not something new; Beethoven himself interpreted his own music with a lot of freedom. Beethoven wrote: "my tempi are valid only for the first bars, as feeling and expression must have their own tempo", and "why do they annoy me by asking for my tempi? Either they are good musicians and ought to know how to play my music, or they are bad musicians and in that case my indications would be of no avail". Beethoven's disciples, such as Anton Schindler, testified that the composer varied the tempo when he conducted his works.

Wagner's tradition was followed by the first two permanent conductors of the Berlin Philharmonic. Hans von Bülow highlighted more the unitary structure of symphonic works, while Arthur Nikisch stressed the magnificence of tone. The styles of these two conductors were synthesized by Furtwängler.

In Munich (1907–1909), Furtwängler studied with Felix Mottl, a disciple of Wagner. He considered Arthur Nikisch as his model. According to John Ardoin, Wagner's subjective style of conducting led to Furtwängler, and Mendelssohn's objective style of conducting led to Toscanini.

Furtwängler's art was deeply influenced by the great Jewish music theorist Heinrich Schenker with whom he worked between 1920 and Schenker's death in 1935. Schenker was the founder of Schenkerian analysis, which emphasized underlying long-range harmonic tensions and resolutions in a piece of music. Furtwängler read Schenker's famous monograph on Beethoven's Ninth symphony in 1911, subsequently trying to find and read all his books. Furtwängler met Schenker in 1920, and they continuously worked together on the repertoire which Furtwängler conducted. Schenker never secured an academic position in Austria and Germany, in spite of Furtwängler's efforts to support him. Schenker depended on several patrons including Furtwängler. Furtwängler's second wife certified much later that Schenker had an immense influence on her husband. Schenker considered Furtwängler as the greatest conductor in the world and as the "only conductor who truly understood Beethoven".

Furtwängler's recordings are characterized by an "extraordinary sound wealth ", special emphasis being placed on cellos, double basses, percussion and woodwind instruments. According to Furtwängler, he learned how to obtain this kind of sound from Arthur Nikisch. This richness of sound is partly due to his "vague" beat, often called a "fluid beat". This fluid beat created slight gaps between the sounds made by the musicians, allowing listeners to distinguish all the instruments in the orchestra, even in tutti sections. Vladimir Ashkenazy once said: "I never heard such beautiful fortissimi as Furtwängler's." According to Yehudi Menuhin, Furtwängler's fluid beat was more difficult but superior than Toscanini's very precise beat.

Unlike Otto Klemperer, Furtwängler did not try to suppress emotion in performance, instead giving a hyper romantic aspect to his interpretations. The emotional intensity of his World War II recordings is particularly famous. Conductor and pianist Christoph Eschenbach has said of Furtwängler that he was a "formidable magician, a man capable of setting an entire ensemble of musicians on fire, sending them into a state of ecstasy".

Furtwängler desired to retain an element of improvisation and of the unexpected in his concerts, each interpretation being conceived as a re-creation. However, melodic line as well as the global unity were never lost with Furtwängler, even in the most dramatic interpretations, partly due to the influence of Heinrich Schenker and to the fact that Furtwängler was a composer and had studied composition during his whole life.

Furtwängler was famous for his exceptional inarticulacy when speaking about music. His pupil Sergiu Celibidache remembered that the best he could say was, "Well, just listen" (to the music). Carl Brinitzer from the German BBC service tried to interview him, and thought he had an imbecile before him. A live recording of a rehearsal with a Stockholm orchestra documents hardly anything intelligible, only hums and mumbling. On the other hand, a collection of his essays, On Music, reveals deep thought.

== Influence ==
One of Furtwängler's early protégés was the piano prodigy Karlrobert Kreiten, who was killed by the Nazis in 1943 because he had criticized Hitler. Furtwängler was an important influence on the Argentine-born pianist and conductor Daniel Barenboim, who decided to become a conductor when he was eight years old during a concert performance of J.S. Bach's St Matthew Passion conducted by Furtwängler in Buenos Aires in 1950. (Furtwängler's widow, Elisabeth, later said of Barenboim's conducting, "Er furtwänglert" ("He furtwänglers"). Barenboim recorded Furtwängler's 2nd Symphony with the Chicago Symphony Orchestra.

Other conductors known to speak admiringly of Furtwängler include Valery Gergiev, Claudio Abbado, Carlos Kleiber, Carlo Maria Giulini, Simon Rattle, Sergiu Celibidache, Otto Klemperer, Karl Böhm, Bruno Walter, Dimitri Mitropoulos, Christoph Eschenbach, Alexander Frey, Philippe Herreweghe, Eugen Jochum, Zubin Mehta, Ernest Ansermet, Nikolaus Harnoncourt, Bernard Haitink (who decided to become a conductor as a child and bedridden while listening to a Furtwängler concert on the radio during the second world war), Rafael Kubelík, Gustavo Dudamel, Jascha Horenstein (who had worked as an assistant to Furtwängler in Berlin during the 1920s), Kurt Masur and Christian Thielemann.

For instance, Carlos Kleiber thought that "nobody could equal Furtwängler". More precisely, he said once: "You know, he’s simply the best. There’s no one like him… It’s hopeless. Kleiber was once asked why de didn't conduct Beethoven's ninth symphony. His reported reply was something to the effect of: "It's all been said already... by him [Furtwängler]". Similar remarks by Kleiber can be found about Bruckner's 8th, Bruckner's 4th, etc.

George Szell, whose precise musicianship was in many ways antithetical to Furtwängler's, always kept a picture of Furtwängler in his dressing room. Even Arturo Toscanini, usually regarded as Furtwängler's complete antithesis (and sharply critical of Furtwängler on political grounds), once said – when asked to name the World's greatest conductor apart from himself – "Furtwängler!". Herbert von Karajan, who in his early years was Furtwängler's rival, maintained throughout his life that Furtwängler was one of the great influences on his music making, even though his cool, objective, modern style had little in common with Furtwängler's white-hot Romanticism. Karajan said:

He certainly had an enormous influence on me ... I remember that when I was Generalmusikdirektor in Aachen, a friend invited me to a concert that Furtwängler gave in Cologne ... Furtwängler's performance of the Schumann's Fourth, which I didn't know at the time, opened up a new world for me. I was deeply impressed. I didn't want to forget this concert, so I immediately returned to Aachen.

And Claudio Abbado said in an interview about his career (published in 2004):

Furtwängler is the greatest of all […]; Admittedly, one can sometimes dispute his choices, his options, but enthusiasm almost always prevails, especially in Beethoven. He is the musician who had the greatest influence on my artistic education.

Furtwängler's performances of Beethoven, Wagner, Bruckner, and Brahms remain important reference points today, as do his interpretations of other works such as Haydn's 88th Symphony, Schubert's Ninth Symphony, and Schumann's Fourth Symphony. He was also a champion of modern music, notably the works of Paul Hindemith and Arnold Schoenberg and conducted the world premiere of Sergei Prokofiev's Fifth Piano Concerto (with the composer at the piano) on 31 October 1932 as well as the world premiere performances of Béla Bartók's Piano Concerto No. 1 in July 1927 at the ISCM Festival in Frankfurt (again with the composer at the piano).

The musicians who have expressed the highest opinion about Furtwängler are some of the most prominent ones of the 20th century such as Arnold Schoenberg, Paul Hindemith, or Arthur Honegger. (Note: About Furtwängler's second symphony, Honneger wrote: "the man who can write a score so rich as this is not to be argued about. He is of the race of great musicians". CD Wilhelm Furtwängler The Legend, 9 08119 2, EMI, 2011, p. 7.) Soloists such as Dietrich Fischer-Dieskau, Yehudi Menuhin Pablo Casals, Kirsten Flagstad, Claudio Arrau and Elisabeth Schwarzkopf who have played music with almost all the major conductors of the 20th century have clearly declared upon several occasions that, for them, Furtwängler was the most important one. For instance, Fischer-Dieskau said:

"For me, Wilhelm Furtwängler was the greatest conductor I have ever met. His art of conducting was the realization of a spiritual and intellectual conception. He was no 'time-beater'; his technique, often so much discussed and criticized, served solely to bring out the metaphysical aspect of the music. When he conducted, it was as if the work were being created anew, in a process of spiritual and intellectual revelation."

John Ardoin has reported the following discussion he has had with Maria Callas in August 1968 after having listened to Beethoven's Eighth Symphony with the Cleveland Orchestra conducted by George Szell:

"Well", she sighed, "you see what we have been reduced to. We are now in a time when a Szell is considered a master. How small he was next to Furtwängler." Reeling this disbelief – not at her verdict, with which I agreed, but from the unvarnished acuteness of it – I stammered, "But how do you know Furtwängler? You never sang with him." "How do you think?" she stared at me with equal disbelief. "He started his career after the war in Italy [in 1947]. I heard dozens of his concerts there. To me, he was Beethoven."

== Notable recordings ==
There are a huge number of Furtwängler recordings currently available, mostly live. Many of these were made during World War II using experimental tape technology. After the war they were confiscated by the Soviet Union for decades, and have only recently become widely available, often on multiple labels. In spite of their limitations, the recordings from this era are widely admired by Furtwängler devotees.

The following represents only a small selection of some of Furtwängler's most famed recordings.

Symphony No. 2 (Brahms), 1st movement
Furtwängler's handling of this passage from the first movement of Brahms's Second Symphony has been widely praised] for its handling of tempo and mood.

- Johann Sebastian Bach, St Matthew Passion (first half only), live performance with the Vienna Philharmonic, 1952 (Südwestfunk)
- Bartók, Violin Concerto No. 2, studio recording with Yehudi Menuhin and with the Philharmonia Orchestra, 1953 (EMI)
- Beethoven, Third Symphony, live performance with the Vienna Philharmonic, December 1944 (Music and Arts, Preiser, Tahra) (Note: About this recording, often considered one of the most important ones of the 20th century, John Ardoin wrote: "The magnificent 1944 performance with the Vienna Philharmonic [is] an authenticated performance that is not only Furtwängler's noblest and most compelling Eroica, but one unrivalled on disc." "A performance of prodigious classicism, it presents us with figures that seem to us to be made of stone by virtue of their nobility and of fire because of their compelling urgency, but which, on the wings of a scherzo at the pace of a march, suddenly releases the infinite – placed on record", André Tubeuf, EMI C 051-63332, 1969. "A guide to the best recordings of Beethoven's Symphony No 3, Eroica". Gramophone. "In the high peaks of the Marcia funebre and in the finale, the 1944 Vienna performance remains unsurpassed ... No conductor articulates the drama of the Eroica – human and historical, individual and universal – more powerfully or eloquently than Furtwängler. Of his 11 extant recordings, it is this 1944 Vienna account, closely followed by the 1950 Berlin version, which most merits pride of place.")
- Beethoven, Third Symphony, live performance with the Berlin Philharmonic, December 1952 (Tahra)
- Beethoven, Fifth Symphony, live performance with the Berlin Philharmonic, June 1943 (Classica d'Oro, Deutsche Grammophon, Enterprise, Music and Arts, Opus Kura, Tahra)
- Beethoven, Fifth Symphony, live performance with the Berlin Philharmonic, May 1954 (Tahra)
- Beethoven, Sixth Symphony, live performance with the Berlin Philharmonic, March 1944 (Tahra)
- Beethoven, Seventh Symphony, live performance with the Berlin Philharmonic, October 1943 (Classica d'Oro, Deutsche Grammophon, Music and Arts, Opus Kura) (Note: Harry Halbreich wrote in his analysis of this performance: "Does the second movement remain an Allegretto under Furtwängler's baton? Many critics have raised this question, troubled by the spaciousness even more than in Berlin than in Vienna [in 1950]. And yet, why hesitate? From the first bars, this perfection overrules us – beyond doubt, this is humanely, organically the right tempo and it would be completely insensitive and unmusical to argue otherwise ... Who could describe the incredible beauty of phrasing of the song of violas and cellos ... the sublime expressiveness of the violins? ... The second theme on its reappearance seems still more moving and expressive ... This Finale was always one of Furtwängler's great warhorses and undoubtedly the summit of this interpretation ... Furtwängler relives his unbelievable performance of the end of the Fifth Symphony in June 1943, four months before, launching into a break-taking acceleration without the unleashed forces ever escaping the control of the brilliant leader. 'I am the Bacchus who distils the delicious nectar for mankind, and brings them to divine frenzy of the spirit': thus Beethoven explained himself. But it takes a demiurge like Furtwängler, that autumn day in 1943, to bring that frenzy to life in sound!", Harry Halbreich, CD Furtwängler conducts Beethoven, SWF 941, 1994, p. 11.)
- Beethoven, Ninth Symphony, live performance with the Berlin Philharmonic, March 1942 with Tilla Briem, Elisabeth Höngen, Peter Anders, Rudolf Watzke, and the Bruno Kittel Choir (Classica d'Oro, Music and Arts, Opus Kura, Tahra, SWF) (Note: Harry Halbreich wrote in his analysis of this performance that, for the first movement, "nobody has ever approached Furtwängler in the evocation of this terrifying release of cosmic forces" and about the Adagio: "in its superhuman spaciousness, which seems to seek to renounce human time and to align itself with that of creation, was not this Adagio the highest achievement of Wilhelm Furtwängler's art? Certainly no other conductor allowed himself such interpretative scope, and none put himself so much at risk. Yet on actual hearing the tempi prove so right, so natural lending themselves so perfectly to the whole presentation of the musical thought that one can hardly imagine anything different". For the Finale, he says: "from bar 321 Furtwängler imperiously asserts his presence with a gradual allargando building up to the colossal fortissimo of bar 330 followed by a timeless pause, a divine vision in which Beethoven, thanks to an interpreter worthy of him, equals the stature of the Michelangelo of the Sistine Chapel", Harry Halbreich, CD Beethoven, Ninth Symphony, SWF 891R, 2001, pp. 8–10. "The 1942 performance in Berlin is one of the most convincing proofs of Furtwängler's rebellion during Germany's tragic era, while the Nazis tried in vain to bury the great German musical heritage by using it for their sinister ends. Furtwängler fought for it and strived to save it from their cluthes", Sami Habra, CD Furtwängler, Beethoven's Choral Symphony, Tahra FURT 1101–1104, p. 19.)
- Beethoven, Ninth Symphony, live performance at the 29 July 1951 re-opening of Bayreuther Festspiele (not to be confused with EMI's release) with Elisabeth Schwarzkopf, Elisabeth Höngen, Hans Hopf and Otto Edelmann. (Orfeo D'or, 2008). (Note: Sami Habra wrote regarding this very famous concert: "Yet, after the war, he had to prove to the World that German musical Art had indeed survived that fateful period as well as some attempts by the Allies to ignore or undermine German culture. The whole musical world retained its breath while Beethoven was universally re-born when Furtwängler conducted the Ninth for the re-opening of Bayreuth in 1951." Sami Habra, CD Furtwängler, Beethoven's Choral Symphony, Tahra FURT 1101–1104, p. 19.)
- Beethoven, Ninth Symphony, ostensibly a live performance at the 29 July 1951 re-opening of Bayreuther Festspiele but purported by the president of the Wilhelm Furtwängler Society of America to actually be dress-rehearsal takes edited by EMI into one recording, all performed prior to the actual public performance. (EMI, 1955).
- Beethoven, Ninth Symphony, live performance at the 1954 Lucerne Festival with the London Philharmonia, Lucerne Festival Choir, Elisabeth Schwarzkopf, Elsa Cavelti, Ernst Haefliger and Otto Edelmann (Music and Arts, Tahra). (Note: Sami Habra said: "The Lucerne 1954 concert, Furtwängler's last performance of the Ninth, allowed the listener an even deeper insight into the great conductor's art, the most important impression being that of abyssal depths that permeate this Swan song: no doubt Furtwängler sensed his end was near...", Sami Habra, CD Furtwängler, Beethoven's Choral Symphony, Tahra FURT 1101–1104, p. 19.)
- Beethoven, Violin Concerto, studio recording with Yehudi Menuhin and with the Lucerne Festival Orchestra, 1947 (Testament)
- Beethoven, Piano Concerto No. 5, studio recording with Edwin Fischer and with the Philharmonia Orchestra, 1951 (Naxos)
- Beethoven, Fidelio, live performance with the Vienna Philharmonic with Elisabeth Schwarzkopf, Kirsten Flagstad, Anton Dermota, Julius Patzak, Paul Schoeffler, Josef Greindl, and Hans Braun, August 1950 (Opus Kura)
- Beethoven, Fidelio, both live and studio recordings, with Martha Mödl, his preferred soprano, in the title role, and Wolfgang Windgassen, Otto Edelmann, Gottlob Frick, Sena Jurinac, Rudolf Schock, Alfred Poell, Alwin Hendriks, Franz Bierbach, and the Vienna Philharmonic.
- Brahms, First Symphony, live performance with the North German Radio Symphony Orchestra, Hamburg, October 1951 (Music and Arts, Tahra). (Note: "This Brahms 1st turned out to be Furtwängler's best version ... More than ever, the broad opening, with the hammering of Friedrich Weber on the timpani and the soaring strings of that magnificent ensemble, impress the listener. The special quality of the string section, miraculously dense and transparent at the same time, permeates the whole work. The four great fortissimi of the first movement have an irresistible 'élan', the long lyrical phrases of the second movement enchant the listener with their intensity. The third movement is Furtwängler at his most feverish here, and full of serenity is reached only after the repeated trumpet calls ... The 4th movement is played with unmistakable grandeur and solemnity, as indeed the whole work is. While keeping Brahms' personality in mind, Furtwängler nevertheless brings out Beethoven's influence on Brahms ... No wonder the French critics bestowed upon this recording the Diapason d'Or of the century...", Sami Habra, CD Wilhelm Furtwängler, his legendary post-war recordings, Tahra, Harmonia Mundi, FURT 1054/1057, p. 19.)
- Brahms, Second Symphony, live performance with the Vienna Philharmonic, January 1945 (Deutsche Grammophon, Music and Arts)
- Brahms, Third Symphony, live performance with the Berlin Philharmonic, December 1949 (EMI). (Note: "Furtwängler's interpretations of Brahms go beyond the merely 'composed' notation and realise the vision of the organic form that hovered before Brahms but can no longer be attained. Herein lies the explanation of the flawless formal architecture of his interpretations as well as the psychical compulsion of their musical performance that never becomes lost in detail but, to the contrary, always keeps the work as a whole in view. In this recording, notwithstanding his traditional interpretative style Furtwängler, unlike many a younger composer, lays more stress on the characteristics beyond the classical model symphony that herald the new trend: 'Spiritual life' which Furtwängler traces and creates anew in each work – in this symphony, energetic and vigorous though it is, spiritual life is not concentrated on the dualism of the themes, the dramatic development and the intensity of the finale, but above all on the variety of tone-colours which are here formative energy that puts a constantly changing complexion on the scarcely modulated themes and motifs and becomes the favourite means of musical expression.", Sigurd Schimpf, EMI C 049-01 146.)
- Brahms, Fourth Symphony, live performance with the Berlin Philharmonic, December 1943 (Tahra, SWF)
- Brahms, Fourth Symphony, live performance with the Berlin Philharmonic, October 1948 (EMI)
- Brahms, Violin Concerto, studio recording with Yehudi Menuhin and with the Lucerne Festival Orchestra, 1949 (Tahra, Naxos)
- Brahms, Piano Concerto No. 2, live performance with Edwin Fischer and with the Berlin Philharmonic, 1942 (Testament)
- Bruckner, Fourth Symphony, live performance with the Berlin Philharmonic, October 1941 (WFCJ)
- Bruckner, Fifth Symphony, live performance with the Berlin Philharmonic, October 1942 (Classica d'Oro, Deutsche Grammophon, Music and Arts, Testament). (Note: "The interpretation is typically manic: very fast, and very slow. It lurches about impulsively and has thrilling moments–but also some pretty distressing examples of shoddy ensemble, particularly in the scherzo and finale. It was all too seldom that Furtwängler managed to keep his band together to allow him to time his climaxes optimally. A classic case of 'overshoot' occurs at the end of the first movement, which sounds terribly rushed. The Adagio, though, is magnificent...", "Bruckner: Symphony No. 5/Furtwängler". classicstoday.com.)
- Bruckner, Sixth Symphony (the first movement is missing), live performance with the Berlin Philharmonic, November 1943 (Music and Arts)
- Bruckner, Seventh Symphony (adagio only), live performance with the Berlin Philharmonic] April 1942 (Tahra). (Note: "Furtwängler has always been Bruckner's greatest exponent ... Again, the tragic element and grandeur are unequalled here. This is a 'desert island' recording, fortunately restored for music lovers of this World to cherish all their life", Sami Habra, CD Furtwängler "revisited", FURT 1099, Tahra, 2005, p. 10.)
- Bruckner, Eighth Symphony, live performance with the Vienna Philharmonic, October 1944 (Deutsche Grammophon, Music and Arts)
- Bruckner, Ninth Symphony, live performance with the Berlin Philharmonic, October 1944 (Deutsche Grammophon)
- Franck, Symphony, live performance with the Vienna Philharmonic, 1945 (SWF)
- Furtwängler, Second Symphony, live performance with the Vienna Philharmonic, February 1953 (Orfeo)
- Gluck, Alceste Ouverture, studio recording with the Vienna Philharmonic, 1954 (SWF)
- Haendel, Concerto Grosso Opus 6 No. 10, live performance with the Berlin Philharmonic, February 1944 (Melodiya)
- Haendel, Concerto Grosso Opus 6 No. 10, live performance with the Teatro Colón Orchester, 1950 (Disques Refrain)
- Haydn, 88th Symphony, studio recording with the Berlin Philharmonic, 5 December 1951 (Deutsche Grammophon)
- Hindemith, Symphonic Metamorphosis of Themes by Carl Maria von Weber, studio recording with the Berlin Philharmonic, 16 September 1947 (Deutsche Grammophon, Urania)
- Mahler, Lieder eines fahrenden Gesellen, live performance with Dietrich Fischer-Dieskau and the Vienna Philharmonic, 1951 (Orfeo)
- Mahler, Lieder eines fahrenden Gesellen, studio recording with Dietrich Fischer-Dieskau and the Philharmonia Orchestra, 1952 (Naxos, EMI)
- Mendelssohn, Violin Concerto, studio recording with Yehudi Menuhin and with the Berlin Philharmonic, 1952 (Naxos, EMI)
- Mozart, Don Giovanni, the 1950, 1953 and 1954 Salzburg Festival recordings (in live performance). These have been made available on several labels, but mostly EMI. A filmed performance of Don Giovanni is also available, featuring Cesare Siepi, Otto Edelmann, Lisa Della Casa, Elisabeth Grümmer, and Anton Dermota.
- Mozart, Die Zauberflöte, a live performance from 27 August 1949, featuring Walther Ludwig, Irmgard Seefried, Wilma Lipp, Gertrud Grob-Prandl, Ernst Haefliger, Hermann Uhde, and Josef Greindl.
- Schubert, Eighth Symphony, live performance with the Berlin Philharmonic, December 1944 (SWF)
- Schubert. Ninth Symphony, studio recording with the Berlin Philharmonic, 1951 (Deutsche Grammophon). The first movement is a supreme example of Furtwaengler's style. Note the sharp accelerandi at the end of the introduction and the middle of the recapitulation.
- Schubert, Ninth Symphony, live performance with the Berlin Philharmonic, 1942 (Deutsche Grammophon, Magic Master, Music and Arts, Opus Kura)
- Schubert, Die Zauberharfe Overture, live performance with the Berlin Philharmonic, September 1953 (Deutsche Grammophon)
- Schumann, Fourth Symphony, studio recording with the Berlin Philharmonic, Deutsche Grammophon, May 1953 (Deutsche Grammophon). (Note: "Schumann's Fourth [has] long [been regarded] as the recording of the century (along with the His Master's Voice Tristan) ... Before the boisterous last movement starts, there is the famous transitional passage in which Furtwängler builds up the most impressive crescendo ever heard. This crescendo is referred to by Conservatoire teachers and conductors as being the very perfection, in spite of its infeasibility. Celibidache and Karajan have tried to imitate Furtwängler in this part on some occasions, but both conductors run out of breath towards the middle of the crescendo. This Furtwängler performance has yet to be equalled...", Sami Habra, CD Furtwängler "revisited", FURT 1099, Tahra, 2005, p. 11.)
- Sibelius, En saga, live performance with the Berlin Philharmonic, February 1943 (SWF)

External audio
- Wilhelm Furtwängler conducting Tchaikovsky's Symphony No. 6 (Pathétique) with the Berlin Philharmonic in 1938

- Tchaikovsky, Fourth Symphony, studio recording with the Vienna Philharmonic, 1951 (Tahra)
- Tchaikovsky, Sixth Symphony Pathétique, studio recording with the Berlin Philharmonic, His Master's Voice, 1938 (EMI, Naxos). (Note: "According to Friedland Wagner, this 1938 performance of the Pathetique by Furtwängler was so overwhelming that Toscanini, in his house at Riverdale, played this recording again and again to his guests on a memorable day, pointing out with enthusiasm all its fine points ... We can safely say that no one has probed as deeply as Furtwängler into the abyss of the tragic contents and pessimistic forebodings of the Pathetique ... The last movement would probably have contained a glimmer of hope, had it not been for the fateful events that were to plunge the World into its darkest hours. Many observers have asserted that Furtwängler had foreseen what was to happen", Sami Habra, CD Furtwängler "revisited", FURT 1099, Tahra, 2005, p. 9.)
- Wagner, Tristan und Isolde, studio recording with Flagstad, His Master's Voice, June 1952 (EMI, Naxos). (Note: "Produced in 1952, this recording, now reissued, has long been something of a landmark in recent history – rightly so, for its importance and its uniqueness are unquestionable ... Wilhelm Furtwängler's architectural greatness is communicated so directly, so forcefully from the very first bar that one immediately forgets the small imperfections of the mono recording ... The most striking thing is certainly the cogency of this interpretation. Nowhere are there hiatuses, breaks in the music's flow. Furtwängler, though far from being a perfectionist in individual detail, invariably seems to see the entire conception before him, so grippingly does he span the work's long arches, so magnificently does he weld together the various components. ... His feeling for form is so compelling in its certainty that one does not stop to consider for a moment that it is not the only way of interpreting a particular phrase or sequence ... The idea of Furtwängler seeking effect from a series of 'purple passages' is unthinkable; and yet the great emotional crescendi, the great climaxes, have a dramatic power scarcely matched elsewhere", Gerhard Brunner, CD Tristan und Isolde, EMI CDS 7 47322 8, p. 20.)
- Wagner, Der Ring des Nibelungen, 1950 (live recording from La Scala in Milan with Kirsten Flagstad)
- Wagner, Der Ring des Nibelungen with Wolfgang Windgassen, Ludwig Suthaus, and Martha Mödl, 1953 (EMI) (recorded live in the RAI (Radiotelevisione Italiana) studios).
- Wagner, Die Walküre, his last recording in 1954. EMI planned to record "Der Ring des Nibelungen" in the studio under Furtwängler, but he only finished this work shortly before his death. The cast includes Martha Mödl (Brünnhilde), Leonie Rysanek (Sieglinde), Ludwig Suthaus (Siegmund), Gottlob Frick (Hunding), and Ferdinand Frantz (Wotan).

== Notable premieres ==
- Bartók, First Piano Concerto, the composer as soloist, Theater Orchestra, Frankfurt, 1 July 1927
- Schoenberg, Variations for Orchestra, Op. 31, Berlin Philharmonic, Berlin, 2 December 1928
- Prokofiev: Piano Concerto No. 5, the composer as soloist, Berlin Philharmonic, 31 October 1932
- Hindemith, Symphony: Mathis der Maler, Berlin Philharmonic Orchestra, Berlin, 11 March 1934
- Richard Strauss, Four Last Songs, Kirsten Flagstad as soloist, Philharmonia Orchestra, London, 22 May 1950

== Notable compositions ==
=== Orchestral ===
Early works

- Overture in E♭ Major, Op. 3 (1899)
- Symphony in D major (1st movement: Allegro) (1902)
- Symphony in B minor (Largo movement) (1908; the principal theme of this work was used as the leading theme of the 1st movement of the Symphony No. 1, in the same key)

Later works

- Symphonic Concerto for Piano and Orchestra (1937, rev. 1952–54)
- Symphony No. 1 in B minor (1941)
- Symphony No. 2 in E minor (1947)
- Symphony No. 3 in C♯ minor (1954)

=== Chamber music ===
- Piano Quintet (for two violins, viola, cello, and piano) in C major (1935)
- Violin Sonata No. 1 in D minor (1935)
- Violin Sonata No. 2 in D major (1939)

=== Choral ===
(all early works)

- Schwindet ihr dunklen Wölbungen droben (Chorus of Spirits, from Goethe's Faust) (1901–1902)
- Religöser Hymnus (1903)
- Te Deum for Choir and Orchestra (1902–1906) (rev. 1909) (first performed 1910)

== In popular culture ==
- British playwright Ronald Harwood's play Taking Sides (1995), set in 1946 in the American zone of occupied Berlin, is about U.S. accusations against Furtwängler of having served the Nazi regime. In 2001 the play was made into a motion picture directed by István Szabó and starring Harvey Keitel and featuring Stellan Skarsgård in the role of Furtwängler.
