= Violin Concerto No. 5 =

Violin Concerto No. 5 may refer to any composers' fifth violin concerto:

- Violin Concerto No. 5 (Mozart) in A Major
- Violin Concerto No. 5 (Paganini) in A minor
- Violin Concerto No. 5 (Vieuxtemps) in A minor

== See also ==
- List of compositions for violin and orchestra
