= Symphony No. 2 (Furtwängler) =

Wilhelm Furtwängler in 1950s

Symphony No. 2 in E minor was written by Wilhelm Furtwängler between 1945 and 1946 in Switzerland. It is in four movements:

1. Assai moderato – Allmählich belebend (bis Allegro) – Von hier ab festes Tempo (Allegro)
2. Andante semplice (Tranquillo) (in C major)
3. Un poco moderato – Più Allegro – Più Moderato – Allegro – Moderato – Allegro (movement is in A minor)
4. Langsam – Moderato andante – Allegro molto – Moderato – Langsam – Moderato – Presto

The symphony is scored for piccolo, 3 flutes, 2 oboes, cor anglais, 3 clarinets, 2 bassoons, contrabassoon, 4 horns, 3 trumpets, 3 trombones, tuba, timpani, percussion (tamtam), and strings.

The outer movements are in sonata form, with some related material. The third movement, which follows the second movement without pause ("attacca Scherzo!") is a scherzo with trio. Unlike Bruckner, Furtwängler makes smooth transitions into and out of the trio.

Like Furtwängler's other symphonic works, the Symphony No. 2 is very rarely performed. Roughly 80 minutes in length, the work is heavily indebted to the late-Romantic style of composers like Anton Bruckner and Richard Wagner. As conductor/musicologist Christopher Fifield has observed, most of Furtwängler's works "are of Brucknerian length but, devoid of Brucknerian genius, few have the material to sustain such proportions."
However, the symphony has strong advocates: Eugen Jochum recorded the work with the Bavarian Radio Symphony Orchestra in 1954, and there is another recording made by Daniel Barenboim conducting the Chicago Symphony Orchestra. There are at least two other recordings besides those conducted by the composer, though in complete cycles of his symphonies. Arthur Honegger wrote of this work, "The man who can write a score as rich as [this] is not to be argued about. He is of the race of great musicians."

Furtwängler himself recorded his Symphony No. 2 in a studio with the Berlin Philharmonic in December 1951. There also exist several public recordings, some of them having been released : with the Hamburg Philharmonic in 1948 (Société Wilhelm Furtwängler), with the Orchestra of Hesse Radio in Frankfurt in 1952 (Wilhelm-Furtwängler-Gesellschaft), with the Vienna Philharmonic in 1953 (Orfeo) and with the South-German Radio Symphony Orchestra in Stuttgart in 1954 (Mediaphon).
