= Violin Concerto No. 5 (Paganini) =

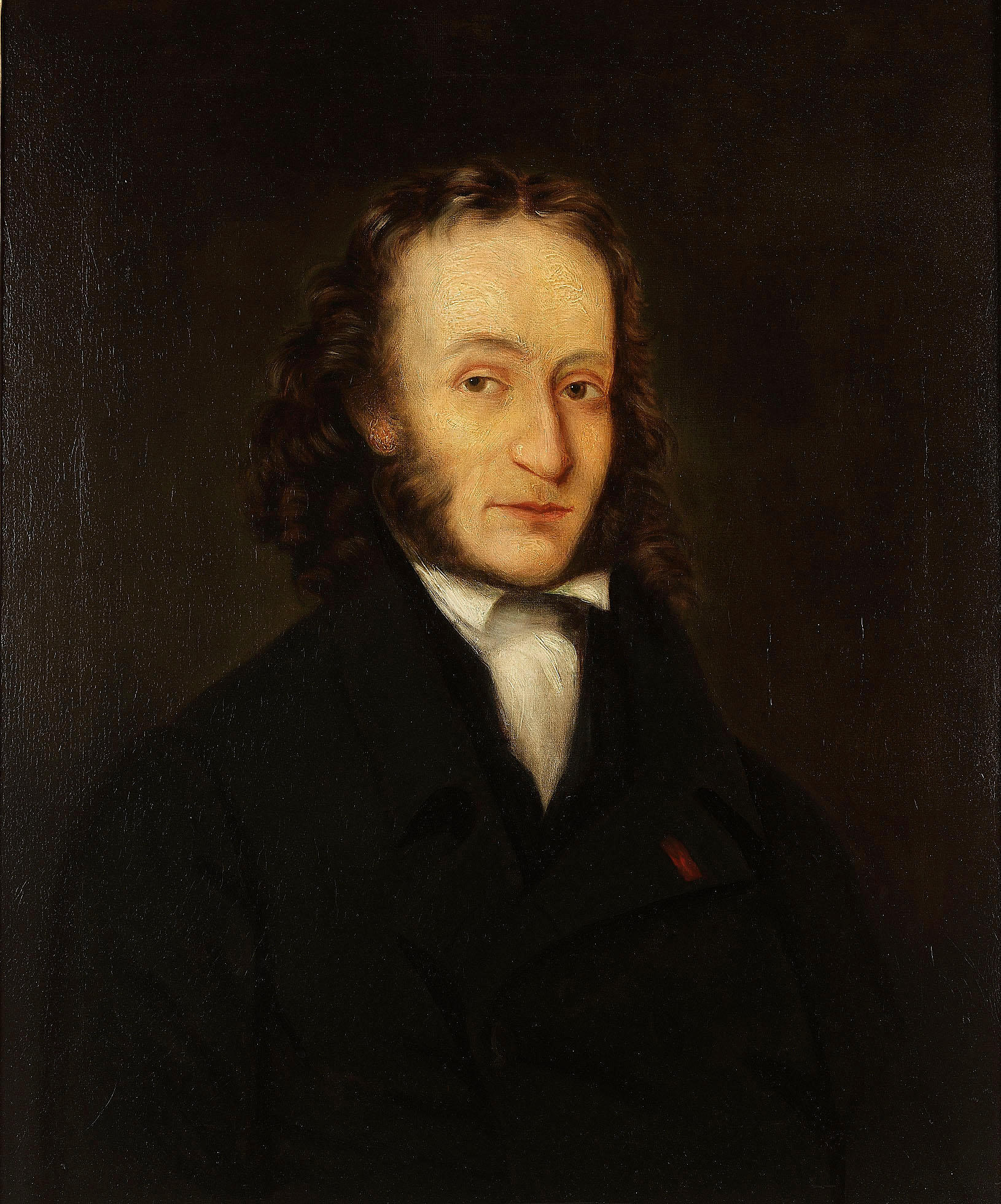
Niccolò Paganini in 1836 by John Whittle

The Violin Concerto No. 5 in A minor was composed by Niccolò Paganini in 1830. It is one of the most widely performed of Paganini's last violin concertos. A typical performance lasts about 40 minutes. It was Paganini's latest-composed concerto (Concerto No. 6 was partially written in 1815).

== Music ==
The concerto structured in three movements:

1. Allegro maestoso (A minor)
2. Andante, un poco sostenuto (E minor – E major)
3. Finale – Rondo, andantino quasi allegretto (A minor)

The first movement is in sonata form, alternates between A minor and A major, and starts with a long orchestral introduction preceding the soloist's entry. The first theme of the first movement is derived from Paganini's "Le Streghe" (Witches' Dance) and the beginning of the second is found in his "Sonata Varsavia" (Warsaw Sonata). The key progression is characteristic of Paganini's minor concertos: A minor – C major – D minor – A major, unexpectedly returning to A minor four measures before the end of the first movement.

The second movement is a slow and mournful andante, beginning in E minor and finishing in E major.

The third is a rondo, with the refrain in A minor and two episodes (primarily in C major, then in F major). In the third movement, the recurring motif is the "alla campanella" melody. Paganini omits the standard trio in the finale as was his standard practice, since the soloist is limited here to mostly virtuosic passages. The final phrase of the third movement contains an allusion to his Caprice No. 24.

== History ==
Only the solo part of Paganini's Concerto No. 5, with a few annotations on the accompaniment, is extant; the orchestral score either was not written down or has not yet been discovered. According to the manuscript, it was composed no earlier than the spring of 1830, but was not published in any form until 1976.

Because the solo part exists, the concerto can be performed if reconstructed. There are three known reconstructions of the concerto. The first, from the late 19th century, was made by Romeo Franzoni and Giusto Dacci; the second by Marco Anzoletti was made in the early 20th century, but both were never published. In 1958, Vittorio Baglioni entrusted a new reconstruction to Federico Mompellio on behalf of the Accademia Musicale Chigiana and in September 1959 the concerto received its premiere performance. Franco Gulli was the soloist and Luciano Rosada was the conductor. The success of this performance led Gulli to present the concerto in many European cities.

== Recordings ==
- Massimo Quarta (soloist and conductor), Orchestra del Teatro Carlo Felice di Genova, recorded in 2000 (Dynamic CDS300; Paganini concerto played on Paganini's violin; vol.2, released in 2002)
- Salvatore Accardo (soloist), Charles Dutoit (conductor), London Philharmonic Orchestra (Deutsche Grammophon 2530 961; recorded 1975)
