= Piano Concerto No. 5 (Prokofiev) =

1932 piano concerto by Sergei Prokofiev

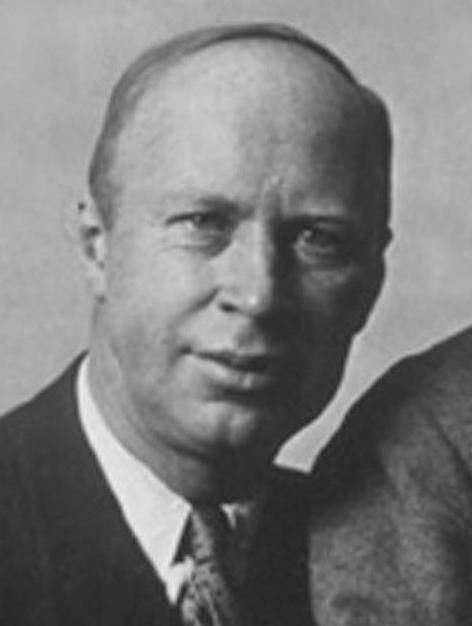
Sergei Prokofiev in 1936

The last complete piano concerto by Sergei Prokofiev, Piano Concerto No. 5 in G major, Op. 55, dates to 1932. It was premiered by Prokofiev himself at the piano on October 30, 1932, accompanied by the Berlin Philharmonic conducted by Wilhelm Furtwängler.

Prokofiev's last piano concerto dates from 1932, a year after he finished the fourth piano concerto, whose solo part is for left hand only. According to the composer, he was then inspired to write another for two hands, whose intended simplicity was reflected in the desire to call it, not a concerto, but rather 'Music for Piano and Orchestra.' However, as the piece grew in complexity, Prokofiev decided to include it among his numbered concerti instead. It is in five short movements. The longest, a Larghetto, is around seven minutes in length. The remaining four movements are all in a fast tempo and feature virtuoso keyboard writing; the third movement, only around two minutes long, functions as a variation on the first.

== Music ==
The work is scored for solo piano, 2 flutes, 2 oboes, 2 clarinets, 2 bassoons, 2 horns, 2 trumpets, 2 trombones, tuba, timpani, bass drum, snare drum and strings.

The concerto lasts 20–25 minutes, with five movements:

1. Allegro con brio (4–5 min) (G major)
2. Moderato ben accentuato (3–4 min) (C major)
3. Toccata: Allegro con fuoco (1–2 min) (G major)
4. Larghetto (6–7 min) (B♭ major)
5. Vivo (5–6 min) (B♭ minor – G major)

The concerto exudes a particularly boisterous, even blustering atmosphere. The movements one to three feature similar themes, the first and third begin similarly, all three captivate largely by their rhythm. The second begins with lightning glissandi, introducing a dancing theme, later contrasted by more spreading motions. It ends in curiosity.

The fourth movement comes as a bit of a surprise after what seems to be a fairly closed work. It is the longest and accordingly the slowest of all and has a climax of heroic grandeur. The Vivo opens poignantly, then goes over into a quieter mood, making use of the unconventional Locrian mode. The concerto ends at a blazing volume.

== Recordings ==
Sviatoslav Richter's recording of this concerto with Witold Rowicki on Deutsche Grammophon is widely admired.
