= Cecilian Movement =

19th-century movement for church music reform

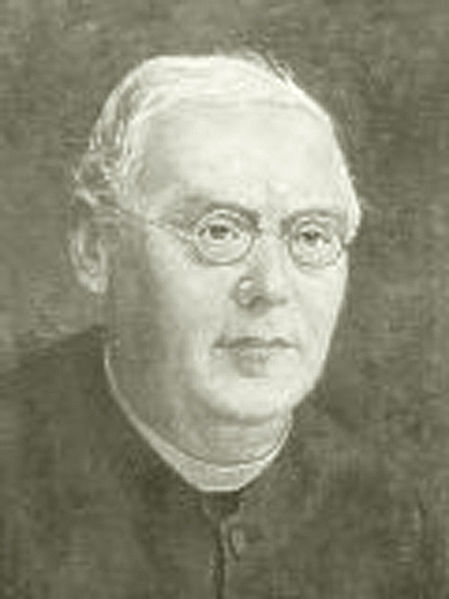
Franz Xaver Haberl

The young Lorenzo Perosi

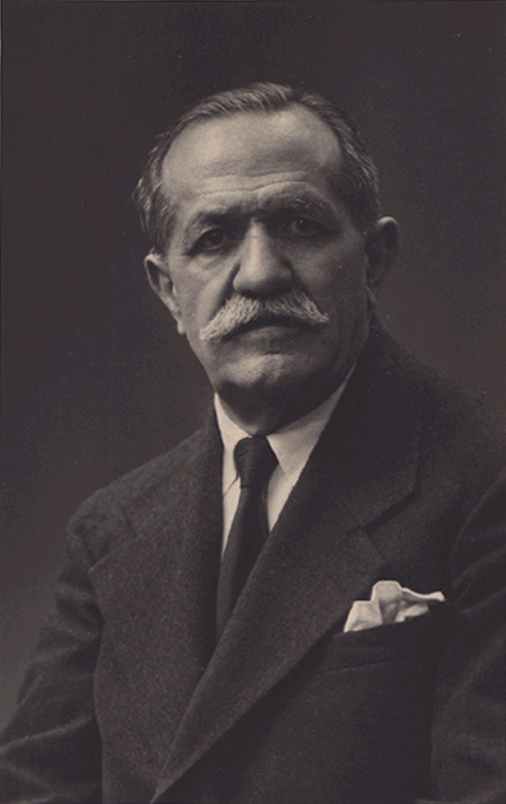
Giovanni Tebaldini

The Cecilian Movement for church music reform began in Germany in the second half of the 1800s as a reaction to the liberalization of the Enlightenment.

The Cecilian Movement received great impetus from Regensburg, where Franz Xaver Haberl had a world-renowned school for church musicians. Their theoretical ideas were formulated by Ludwig Tieck, Friedrich and August Wilhelm Schlegel, Johann Michael Sailer, E. T. A. Hoffmann, and Anton Friedrich Justus Thibaut.

== Institutionalization ==
Although the movement traced its roots back to the 15th-century Congregazioni Ceciliani, which in turn inspired the formation during the 18th century in Munich, Passau, Vienna, and other places of Caecilien-Bündnisse (Cecilian Leagues) with the goal of promoting the a cappella singing of sacred music (in keeping with the edicts of the Council of Trent), the Cecilian movement proper is considered to have been established only in the 19th century. Franz Xaver Witt, a priest trained in Regensburg, published a call for reform of church music and three years later, on the occasion of a rally of Catholics in Bamberg, founded the first formal body of the movement, the Allgemeiner Deutscher Cäcilienverein. After Pope Pius IX sanctioned this organization in 1870, similar groups soon sprang up in the Netherlands, Italy, Belgium, Poland, Bohemia, Croatia (Ivan Zajc, Franjo Dugan, Albe Vidaković), Hungary, Switzerland, and North America.

== Chant reform ==
The deficiencies of the official version of the Gradual and Antiphonal, the Medicean edition of 1614, had become evident by the beginning of the 19th century. Calls for its reform led to publication of the Mechlin edition in 1848 which, despite a few attempts at correction retained many of the faults of the Medicean version. in 1871, Franz Xaver Haberl and the publisher Pustet of Regensburg reissued this edition of the Gradual, claiming it to be the work of Palestrina, which made it an initial success. They also issued an Antiphonal, based largely on the Venetian edition of 1580.

In 1904, a papal decree reinstated the readings of the Editio vaticana, effectively bringing the Regensburg chant-reform efforts to an end and rendering Haberl's internationally disseminated textbook Magister choralis unusable.

== Publishers ==
The German publishing houses most closely associated with the Cecilian movement were Pustet in Regensburg, Schwann in Düsseldorf, and Böhm in Augsburg. Journals allied with the movement include Fliegende Blätter für katholische Kirchenmusik, Musica sacra, Cäcilienkalender, Kirchenmusikalisches Jahrbuch, and Gregoriusblatt in Germany, Chorwächter in Switzerland, Kirchenmusikalische Vierteljahresschrift and Wiener Blätter für katholische Kirchenmusik in Austria, and Caecilia in the United States. In Croatia, Cecilian Society (Cecilijino društvo) was formed that started printing Sveta Cecilija journal.

== Timeline ==
- 1848: Publication of the Mechlin Gradual
- 1852: Joseph d'Ortigue publishes Dictionnaire liturgique, historique et théorique de plain-chant et le musique d'église
- 1856: Karl Proske begins publication of Musica sacra
- 1868: Franz Xaver Witt founds Allgemeiner Cäcilien-Verband für Deutschland in Bamberg
- 1870: American Caecilian Society founded in Milwaukee
- 1871: Friedrich Pustet publishes the Ratisbon (Note: Ratisbon = Regensburg) Edition of Gregorian chant for the Mass, followed in 1878 by music of the Divine Office
- 1874: Franz Xaver Haberl founds a Katholische Kirchenmusikschule (now the Hochschule für Katholische Kirchenmusik und Musikpädagogik Regensburg) in Regensburg
- 1898: Lorenzo Perosi appointed to direct the Sistine Choir
- 1903: Pius X's motu proprio Tra le sollecitudini calls for the replacement of the Regensburg Gradual by a Vatican Edition (issued 1908) based on the work of Solesmes Abbey

== Notes and references ==
Notes

Sources

- Combe, Dom Pierre. 2008. The Restoration of Gregorian Chant: Solesmes and the Vatican Edition, translated by Theodore N. Marier and William Skinner. The Catholic University of America Press. ISBN 9780813215488.
- Gmeinwieser, Siegfried. 2001. "Cecilian Movement". The New Grove Dictionary of Music and Musicians, second edition, edited by Stanley Sadie and John Tyrrell. London: Macmillan.
- "Cecilijanski pokret" [Cecilian Movement]. Lexicon of the Croatian Church Music (in Croatian). Samobor: Meridijani. 2011. pp. 53–54. ISBN 978-953-239-140-4.
- Haberl, Dieter. 2001. "Haberl, Franz Xaver". The New Grove Dictionary of Music and Musicians, second edition, edited by Stanley Sadie and John Tyrrell. London: Macmillan.
- Hoffmann, Ernst Theodor Amadeus. 1814. "Alte und neue Kirchenmusik". Allgemeine musikalische Zeitung No. 35, No. 36 and No. 37
- Witt, Franz Xaver. 1865. Der Zustand der katholischen Kirchenmusik zunächst in Altbayern. Regensburg: Pustet.
