= Joseph Hanisch =

Bavarian, Roman Catholic organist and conductor

Joseph Hanisch (24 March 1812 – 9 October 1892) was a Bavarian, Roman Catholic organist and conductor. Hanisch was based in Regensburg from 1829 until his death in 1892.

Son of the organist Anton Franz Hanisch.

== Life ==
Joseph Hanisch was born in Regensburg, Germany on 1 March 1812. His father, Anton Franz Hanisch was the organist of the Basilica of the Nativity of Our Lady, Regensburg (German: Alten Kapelle Regensburg). Joseph's father taught him how to play the organ and in 1829 Hanisch started serious organ lessons under Carl Proske, the organist for the Regensburg Cathedral. After an 1835 trip to Italy in search of compositions from Roman archives, Joseph took an interest in the restoration of Catholic church music.

In 1836 Joseph took over his father's position as the official organist for the Alten Kapelle Regensburg, and worked his way to becoming the organist for the Niedermünster Cathedral in 1866. He also taught harmonica, organ, and musical improvisation lessons at the music school in Regensburg, as well as teaching the young princes The House of Thurn and Taxis.

Joseph also conducted the Regensburg choir from 1859 to 1863, and again from 1867 to 1872.

== Family ==
The Hanisch family originates from Franz Xaver, born in Silesia, who settled in Regensburg in the 1800s as the court oboist of The House of Thurn and Taxis. From then on, the Hanisch family had a great influence on the musical life of Regensburg.

Franz Xaver Hanisch von Greifenthal (1749-?): Oboist, Piano teacher 1776 until 1806; and composer for The House of Thurn and Taxis.

Anton Franz Hanisch von Greifenthal(1786–1835): Organist in the Basilica of the Nativity of Our Lady, Regensburg from 1808; Father of both Joseph and Max Joseph Hanisch.

Joseph Hanisch (1812–1892): Cathedral Organist in Regensburg from 1829 to 1892; son of Barbara Fuhrmann.

Max Joseph Hanisch (1819–1866): Organist and music teacher at St. Emmeram; Son of Anton Franz and Elisabeth Rosalia Hanisch (1799-1826).

Dorothea Hanisch (1854-1945): Pianist (1786-1835): organist in the Basilica of the Nativity of Our Lady, Regensburg from 1808; father of Joseph and Max Joseph Hanisch.

== Impact ==
The foundation of Joseph's compositions come from his study of Gregorian chant, and the masters of church music. He is mostly regarded for his liturgical organ playing and improvisational skills. Through his various posts as an organist and music teacher, Joseph contributed greatly to the Regensburg musical scene. His work in restoring Catholic church music in the Palestrina style spurred Franz Xaver Witt to found the German Caecilia Society.

His major compositions are Missa auxilium Christianorum, Quatuor hymni pro festo corporis Christi, and Konzerte für swei Hörner (English: Concert for two horns).

== Works cited ==
- Schwaiger, Georg (1989). Lebensbilder aus der Geschichte des Bistums Regensburg 23/24,2. 23/24,2 (in German). Regensburg: Verl. des Vereins für Regensburger Bistumsgeschichte. OCLC 645541112.
- Wagner, Fritz; Kammerer, Heinrich (2011). Angelus durus seiner Domspatzen: Franz Xaver Engelhart (1861 - 1924), Domkapellmeister und Komponist; eine Skizze seines Lebens und Wirkens sowie ein Verzeichnis seiner Werke (in German). Deggendorf: Ebner. ISBN 9783934726352. OCLC 772929973.
- Dietel, Gerhard; Dittrich, Raymond (2011). Regensburger Domorganisten: zum 150. Todestag von Carl Proske (1794 - 1861) und zum 80. Geburtstag von Eberhard Kraus (1931 - 2003); Ausstellung in der Bischöflichen Zentralbibliothek Regensburg, St. Petersweg 11-13, 20. Mai bis 22. Juli 2011. Regensburg: Schnell & Steiner. ISBN 9783795425272. OCLC 734051627.
