= Violin Concerto in D major =

Violin Concerto in D major may refer to:

- Violin Concerto No. 2 (Mozart)
- Violin Concerto No. 4 (Mozart)
- Violin Concerto No. 7 (Mozart)
- Violin Concerto (Beethoven)
- Violin Concerto (Brahms)
- Violin Concerto (Tchaikovsky)
- Violin Concerto No. 1 (Prokofiev)
- Violin Concerto No.1 (Paganini)
- Violin Concerto (Stravinsky)
- Violin Concerto (Korngold)
