= Johann Baptist Singenberger =

Swiss composer and music teacher (1848–1924)

Johann Baptist Singenberger (25 May 1848 – 29 May 1924; or John Singenberger) was a Swiss composer, music teacher, editor and publisher. Much of his output was devoted to Catholic liturgical music. He was reckoned to have taught over 1,000 musicians in his lifetime. In 1873 Singenberger founded the American St. Cecilia Society, an organization belonging to the Cecilian movement which sought to revive the spirit of the masses and motets of Palestrina. Singenberger was also a professor of music at the Catholic Normal School in St. Francis, Wisconsin.

Pope Leo XIII knighted Singenberger, conferring upon him the order of St. Gregory the Great.

== Life and career ==
Singenberger was born on 25 May 1848 in the province of St. Gall in Switzerland. He attended St. George Seminary in St. Gall where he befriended Sebastian Gebhard Messmer, who later became Archbishop of Milwaukee. They both graduated from St. Gall in 1861.

He continued his education at a Jesuit boarding school, Stella Matutina, at Feldkirch in Vorarlberg. Here he studied piano, organ and composition under Winnebald Briem and was also influenced by Augustine Line, a noted musician.

He then studied under Carl Greith, who specialized in voice training, at the University of Innsbruck. In 1872 he went to Regensburg to study under Fr. Franz Xaver Witt. While he was at Regensburg, the celebrated firm of Pustet decided to publish Singenberger's first collection of hymns. With its publication began a lifelong friendship between Singenberger and members of the publishing family.

Singenberger went to the United States in April 1873. He maintained the seat of President for the American Saint Caecilia Society for over 30 years and edited its monthly periodical Cecilia for over 50 years. In the words of one of his students, "There has been no other man in America, equally prominent in all phases of church music, equally recognized outside the country, and of equal length of service."
