= Franz Xaver Haberl =

German priest and musicologist

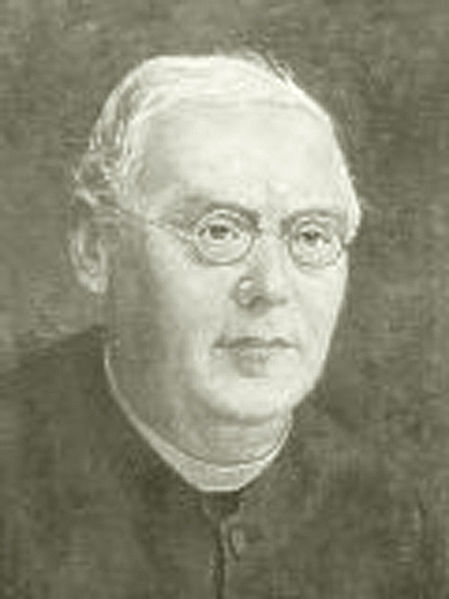
Franz Xaver Haberl

Franz Xaver Haberl (12 April 1840, in Oberellenbach (today Mallersdorf-Pfaffenberg), Lower Bavaria – 5 September 1910, in Ratisbon) was a German musicologist, friend of Liszt, Perosi, and Singenberger, cleric, and student of Proske.

== Biography ==
Haberl made his classical and theological studies at Passau, Bavaria, where he was ordained priest, 12 August 1862. Showing decided aptitude for music, he was given every opportunity for study of the art, and was entrusted with the direction of music in the seminary. From 1867 to 1870 Haberl resided in Rome, where he was active as choirmaster at the German national church, Santa Maria dell'Anima, and also made historical and archæological researches. From 1871 to 1882 he directed the choir at the Ratisbon cathedral.

Working for church music reform, in 1874 Haberl founded a school for church musicians at Regensburg (Ratisbon). This school began with three professors— Haberl, Georg Jakob, and Michael Haller—and only three pupils, and attracted reform-minded church music programs. Haberl not only secured permanency for the school in the shape of endowment, but he built next to it a church, dedicated to St. Cecilia, where pupils are given opportunities for practising the knowledge they have acquired in theory.

He fought for the Editio Medicea against the editions of Solesmes and others. In 1868 Haberl re-edited the Medicæa version of the Gregorian chant, and the Holy See declared his edition authentic and official for the Catholic Church. This form of the chant has since been superseded by the Editio Vaticana.

With Proske, he was a prime mover in the "Caecilia Movement," and helped to edit the fourth volume of Musica Divina.

For thirty years he gathered data and material for a critical edition of the works of Palestrina, completed in 1908 in thirty-three volumes, the first ten of which were prepared by the joint labour of Theodor de Witt, Johannes N. Rauch, Franz Espagne, and Franz Commer. A similar edition of the works of Orlando Lasso, undertaken by him in company with Adolf Sandberger, he left unfinished.

Haberl was president of the Allgemeiner Cäcilien-Verband für Deutschland (Cecilian Society for Germany) from 1899 until his death. He was also editor of Musica sacra and Fliegende Blätter für Kirchenmusik, the official organ of the society. Additionally, he wrote Magister Choralis, now in the twelfth edition, and innumerable articles on historical, theoretical, and scientific subjects. In all these roles, and especially as director of the school he founded, Haberl supported the influence of the Catholic church in musical matters and opposed modernisation.

One of Haberl's most famous students was Lorenzo Perosi.

== Selected writings ==
- Haberl, Franz Xaver (1885–1888). Bausteine für Musikgeschichte [Building Blocks for Music History]. Leipzig: Breitkopf & Härtel. OCLC 9572903.
- —— (1885). Chrysander, Friedrich; Spitta, Philipp; Adler, Guido (eds.). "Wilhelm du Fay". Vierteljahrsschrift für Musikwissenschaft. 1. Leipzig: Breitkopf & Härtel: 397–530. ISSN 0863-6206. OCLC 1773229.
