= Albe Vidaković =

Croatian Catholic priest & composer (1914–1964)

- Born: 1 October 1914
- Died: 18 April 1964 (aged 49)
- Era: Cecilian movement
- Works: see Selected works

Albe Vidaković (1 October 1914 – 18 April 1964) was a Croatian composer, Catholic priest and musicologist, one of the most notable Croatian Classical and Church musicians and musicologists of the 20th century. As a longstanding regens chori of the Zagreb Cathedral and head of the Institute for Church Music, he composed a number of masses, motets and oratorios. Vidaković is most notable for his musicological works on Croatian composers of the 17th century and his collection of Croatian folk songs from Bačka and the Primorje regions. He was among the leaders of the Cecilian Movement in Croatia.

Due to his importance for Croatian Church music in the 20th century, the period of his activity is called the "Albe Vidaković's Period" (Croatian: Razdoblje Albe Vidakovića) in Croatian musicology.

== Biography ==
He was born in Croatian family in Subotica, in the Albe Malagurski Street, near the music school. After graduation in theology and ordination in the Archdiocese of Zagreb, he studied music in Zagreb, attending classes of Franjo Dugan, Filip Hajduković and Matija Ivšić. Recognising his musical talent, he was sent to Pontifical Institute of Sacred Music (1937-1941), where he studied Gregorian chant (Gregorio María Suñol) and composition (Raffaele Casimiri).

== Selected works ==
=== Choral ===
- Gregoriana
- Caeciliana
- Three-part exhibition Old Slavic (Istarska)
- Gospode duša (Lords soul)
- Prosecution in the Temple

== Honours ==
- The choir of the Basilica of St. Teresa in Subotica bears his name.
- Institute of Sacred Music of the Theological Faculty in Zagreb was named: Institute for Church Music Albe Vidaković.
