= Violin Concerto No. 7 (Mozart) =

Violin concerto by W. A. Mozart

Violin Concerto in D major
- No. 7
- by W. A. Mozart
- Key: D major
- Catalogue: K. 271a/271i
- Composed: 1777
- Movements: Three (Allegro maestoso, Andante, Rondo: Allegro)
- Scoring: Violin; orchestra

The so-called Violin Concerto No. 7 in D major, K. 271a/271i, may have been completed by Wolfgang Amadeus Mozart on 16 July 1777 in Salzburg. It has been called the Kolb Concerto.

== Structure ==
The concerto has the usual fast-slow-fast structure and lasts around 26 minutes. The movements are:

1. Allegro maestoso
2. Andante
3. Rondo: Allegro

== Background ==
This violin concerto was first published by Breitkopf & Härtel in an edition by Albert Kopfermann in 1907. Two sources are known for the concerto: a full score from the collection of Aloys Fuchs and a set of parts in Paris made by Eugène Sauzay in 1837 for his teacher (and also father-in-law) Pierre Baillot from the lost autograph (then in the possession of François Habeneck). The source of Fuchs' copy is unknown, and he himself was not sure of the work's authenticity: its layout with the solo violin part on the bottom staff is very uncharacteristic of Mozart, where the solo instrument is usually on the top staff. However, a paper scrap in Sauzay's copy lists the instruments in exactly the same order and the same horn solmisation found in Mozart's authentic violin concerti, supporting the work's authenticity: this was noted by Robert D. Levin. As to how the autograph (if it was truly that) ended up in Habeneck's possession, Mozart may have sold the autograph privately in Paris and the husband of Sauzay's friend Marie Bigot de Moragues had connections to Viennese music publishers. Three cadenzas are found in the Paris copy; two may be Baillot's and the third Sauzay's. Fuchs' copy also had different cadenzas, which Kopfermann suppressed, considering them inauthentic. The two copies differ in some places, and a 37-bar ending in Fuchs' copy corresponds to a short 7-bar ending in the Paris copy: this is seen by some to correspond to Mozart's 1778 statement "If I have time, I shall rearrange some of my violin concertos, and shorten them".

The concerto was unknown to Ludwig Ritter von Köchel and hence it is absent from the first edition of the Köchel catalogue. Paul von Waldersee placed it as K. 271a in the second edition, dating it to 16 July 1777. It was first performed on 4 November 1907 in Dresden. After its first publication and performance, scholars took sides regarding its authenticity. Georges de Saint-Foix did not doubt the work, but believed the published version was a later revision by Mozart dating to 1779 or 1780. Others thought that the work had some content deriving from Mozart but was finished by another person. Rudolf Gerber published another edition in 1934, considering it genuine and noted a theme in the Finale's epilogue to be similar to a theme from the "Gavotte joyeuse" from Mozart's own ballet music to Les petits riens, K. 299b. He also noted similarities between the opening themes of this concerto and the authentic K. 211. The concerto was recorded by Yehudi Menuhin in 1932, with George Enescu's cadenzas, and Menuhin recorded it again in stereo in 1962 and 1974-5.

Alfred Einstein renumbered the work as K. 271i, due to the insertion of new works bearing the numbers K. 271b to K. 271h in the catalogue. He believed that the work was based on a rough sketch of a violin concerto by Mozart from 1777, but states that the original form of the work cannot easily be reconstructed. The uncharacteristic number of passages for the solo violin in the high register, in pizzicato (in the second movement), and in double stops in tenths were considered by Einstein to be 19th-century additions. Friedrich Blume, on the other hand, was firmly in favour of the work's authenticity, stating that "not one passage allows of any room for doubt in regard to themes, harmony, rhythm, construction and orchestration". He noted similarities to violin movements of authentic Mozart serenades and divertimenti, stated that some unusual usage of violin technique was not sufficient grounds for doubting the work's authenticity, and criticized Einstein's ideas regarding the concerto.

Carl Bär published a paper in 1963 that came down in favour of Mozart's authorship, noting that a passage in Joachim von Schiedenhofen's diary for 25 July 1777 stated that a Mozart symphony, a violin concerto (played by Mozart), and a flute concerto were rehearsed at Gusset's. Bär believed that the violin concerto was K. 271a/271i, and also identified this with the violin concerto Leopold referred to as "the concerto you [Wolfgang] wrote for Kolb" on 3 August 1778. He ruled out the five certainly authentic violin concerti as possibilities, as they were written in 1775, and Leopold had stated on 13 August 1778 in a letter that Count Czernin (who had been in Salzburg since April 1775) had never heard the violin being played by Kolb. Kolb was originally thought to be Franz Xavier Kolb (1731–1782), but Bär suspected it to actually have been his older son Johann Andreas (born sometime between 1746-8?). Bär hypothesized that he had been given the concerto by Mozart just before leaving Salzburg, thus dating the concerto to between 16 June (performance of the second Lodron Nachtmusik, K. 287/271h) and 26 July 1777 (Nannerl's name day). Bär also believed the dating of the manuscript ("Salisburgo li 16 di Luglio 1777") to be another point in favour of the work's authenticity, as it was in a similar form to those on most contemporary autographs and was in a time that the author of the heading would not have known a violin concerto had probably been written. But Ernest Hess noted that the work had compositional errors, un-Mozartian phrases, weaknesses in instrumentation, and sequences without meaning that Mozart himself had parodied in his A Musical Joke, K. 522, all speaking against Mozart being the author of this concerto. The sixth edition of the Köchel catalogue kept the work as K. 271i, copying the third edition's remarks, but referencing Hess' doubts as to its authenticity.

Christoph-Hellmut Mahling asked in 1978 if the work could be by someone else and was copied by Mozart, but noted that most questions regarding the work remained unsolved. He edited the volume of the Neue Mozart-Ausgabe containing this work (and the also doubtful Sinfonia Concertante for Four Winds, K. 297b/Anh.C 14.01) in 1980, placing it in the section for doubtful works, and included all the cadenzas in the original copies. Hermann Schmid called the work thoroughly un-Mozartian based on matters of form and technique, saying "I find in the entire Concerto K. 271i no music which I in earnest would put in a claim for Mozart", and dating the composition to the 1780s to a composer who used different forms and techniques to Mozart. In the 2001 Mozart-Jahrbuch, Mahling reviewed earlier published information and gave new commentary and information. He found the concerto to have not much in common with those of Baillot and much more in common with those of Rodolphe Kreutzer, but also noted that the frequent leaps into the high register (reaching up to D_{7}) without many musical reasons was characteristic of the French composition school of the Paris Conservatoire a little later than the customary dating of this concerto: this school included Baillot and Kreutzer. The unusual usage of pizzicato in the second movement has a precedent in Baillot's Sinfonia Concertante for two violins in D minor (Op. 38, written in 1816). The tempo marking "Allegro maestoso" is also characteristic of contemporary French concerti, while the majestic beginning of the concerto in dotted rhythms has much in common with the French overture form. Mahling thus thought that, if the concerto was an arrangement, it was most likely one of Baillot or Kreutzer dating from around 1830. He distinguished five possibilities for the actual provenance of the concerto:

1. Mozart, but dated later;
2. a Mozart arrangement of another's violin concerto;
3. another's arrangement of a Mozart violin concerto;
4. a false attribution or thought attribution to Mozart for a later unrelated work by an unknown composer;
5. a simple forgery (viz. the Adélaïde Concerto, a later violin concerto forgery also attributed to Mozart)

Richard Kapp stated that players from the Czech Philharmonic Chamber Orchestra laughed when playing the piece, because a melody from the third movement is similar to that of the Czech Christmas carol Půjdem spolu do Betléma. This raises the possibility of the concerto having been written by a Czech composer.

The true provenance of the K. 271a/271i concerto remains unknown and debated. All known recordings use the longer ending from Fuchs' copy; but only that of Jean-Jacques Kantorow uses the cadenzas originally found in the copies.
