= Pustet =

German publishing firm

- Founded: 1822
- Founder: Friedrich Pustet
- Country of origin: Germany
- Headquarters location: Regensburg
- Publication types: Books
- Official website: www.pustet.de

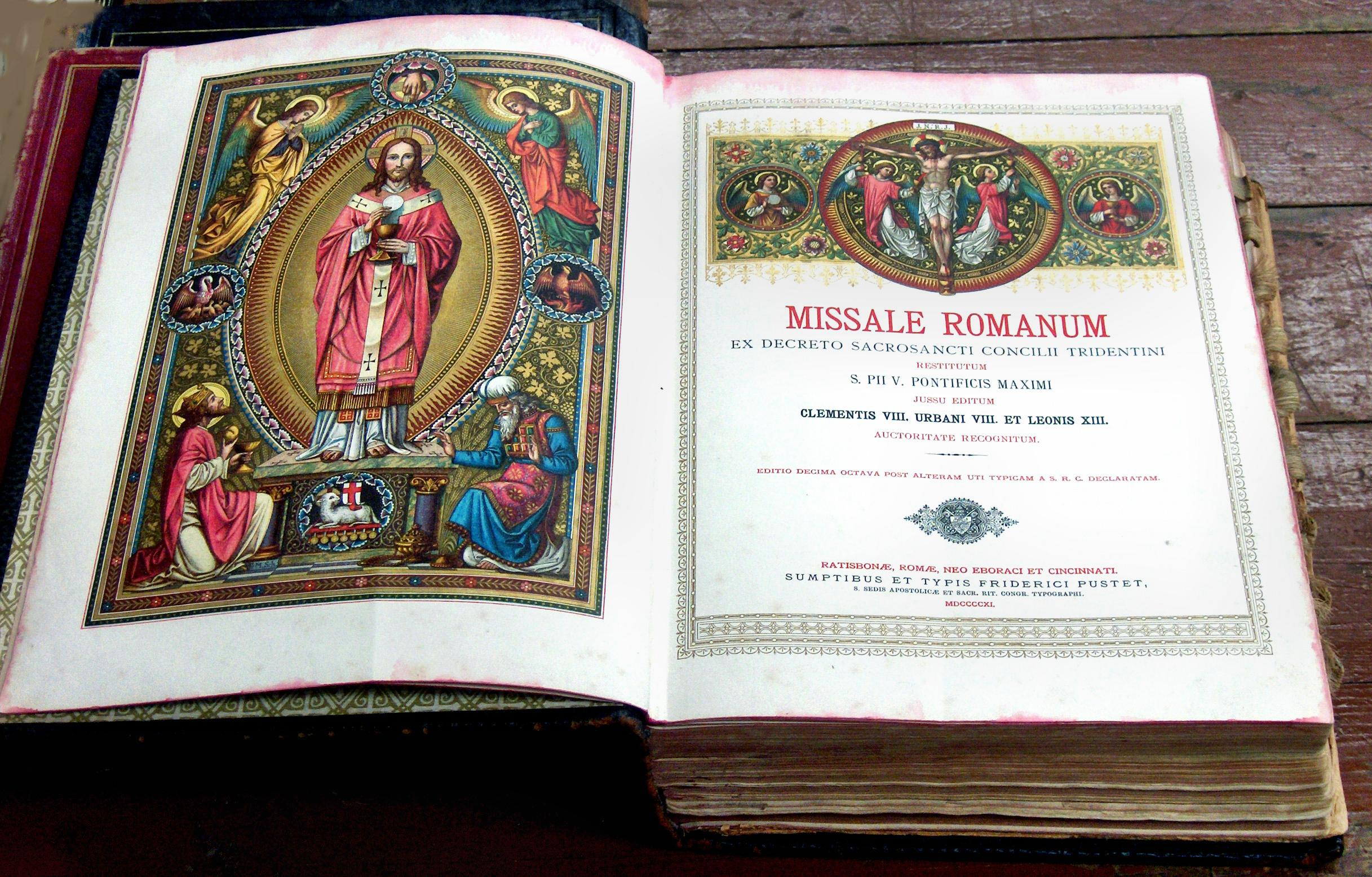
Missale Romanum 18th edition, 1915

Friedrich Pustet GmbH & Co. KG, known as Pustet, is a German publishing house located in Regensburg specializing in scientific literature, particularly in the fields of history and theology. Apart from publishing, Pustet operates a book printing firm and a chain of company-owned book stores across Germany.

Pustet further publishes a range of academic journals and scholarly series in collaboration with, among others, the University of Regensburg, the LMU Munich and the University of Augsburg.

== History ==
The original home of the Pustet family was the Republic of Venice, where the name Bustetto is common. Presumably in the seventeenth century, the founder of the Ratisbon line immigrated to South Germany, where one of his descendants, Anton Pustet, lived as a poor bookbinder in the Lower Bavarian borough of Hals (near Passau) at the close of the eighteenth century. To him and his wife Anna (née Scheuerocker) was born on 25 March 1798, a son, Friedrich Pustet.

Having learned bookbinding under his father, Friedrich started a small book-store in Passau in 1819 and in 1822 founded a separate printing establishment. This business developed, and in 1826 he was able to transfer his publishing business to Regensburg. Establishing business relations with prominent Catholic authors, he extended the range of his publications to all branches of literature, while paying special attention to theology.

To extend his business undertakings, in 1833 Pustet set up one of the first printing-machines, and in 1836 erected near Regensburg a paper factory, for which he procured the first paper machine in Bavaria. In 1845, he began printing liturgical works; with this, he associated a department for church music, with the co-operation of Karl Proske, for the purpose of carrying out the latter's ideas for the reform of ecclesiastical music. Men like Franz Xaver Witt, Franz Xaver Haberl, Karl Ludwig von Haller, later supported this department.

In 1860, he handed over the business to his sons Friedrich (b. 1831), Karl (b. 1839), and Klemens (b. 1833), and two years later acquired in Munich the Royal Bavarian Central Schoolbook-Publishing Company, which he conducted until 1874. He died on 5 March 1882.

The sons continued the expansion of the business. Friedrich chose for his department liturgical publications, Karl German works, and Klemens the paper factory. The success of Friedrich earned for him in 1870 the title Typographus S. R. Congregationis; the Vatican commissioned Pustet to print the editio typica of all the liturgical works. Branch firms were established in New York (1865), Cincinnati, Ohio (1867), and Rome (1898).

Friedrich died on 4 August 1902. Klemens had died before him (1898), and Karl's death followed on 17 January 1910. Karl, who was a Privy Counsellor of Commerce, expanded the German publications: amongst those were the Regensburger Marienkalender and the illustrated family magazine, the Deutscher Hausschatz.

The next generation of the Pustet firm were Friedrich Pustet, son of Friedrich, and Ludwig, son of Karl.
