= Dietmar Hiller =

German musicologist, organist and dramaturge

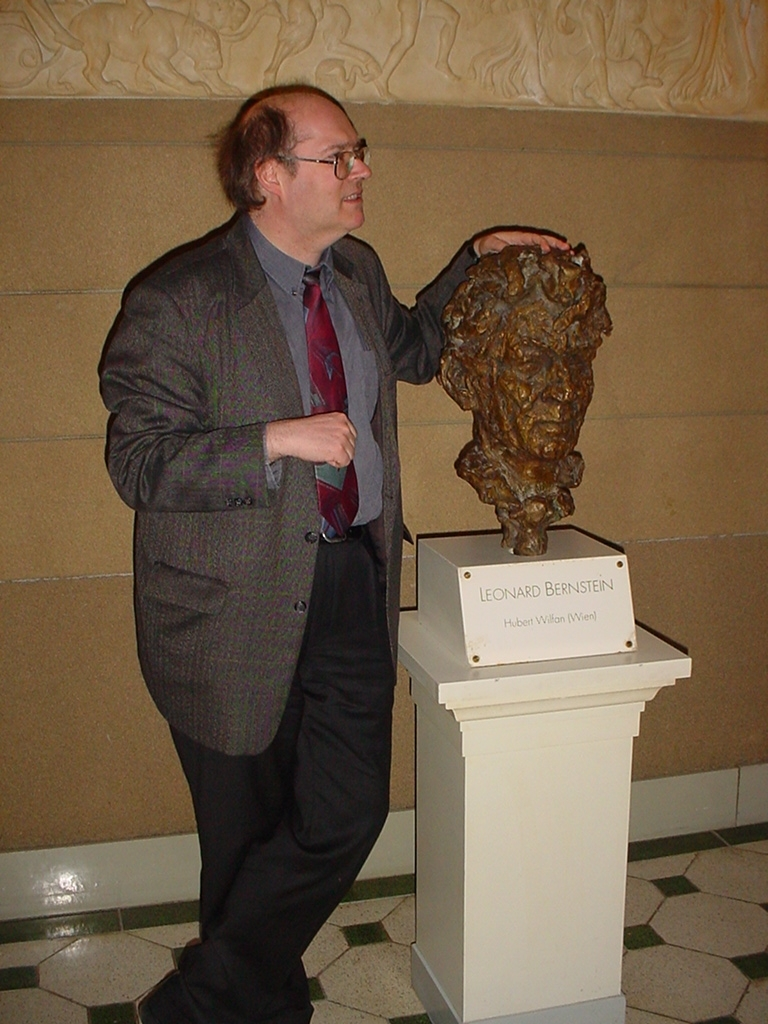
Dietmar Hiller next to the bust of Leonard Bernstein in Konzerthaus Berlin 2006

Dietmar Hiller (born 26 April 1958) is a German musicologist, organist, dramaturg at the Konzerthaus Berlin and docent at the Hochschule für Musik "Hanns Eisler" Berlin.

== Life and career ==
Hiller was born in Berlin. After his Abitur at the Georg-Friedrich-Händel-Gymnasium, a school with a musical orientation, Hiller studied musicology at the Humboldt University of Berlin from 1976 and graduated in 1981. In 1984, he was awarded a doctorate in philosophy. Organ studies with church music director Erich Piasetzki from 1977 to 1984 complemented his artistic training. In 1987, he took part in the improvisation competition for young organists in Halle (Saale).

Since 1984, Hiller has worked as a dramaturge at the Konzerthaus Berlin (Schauspielhaus am Gendarmenmarkt). His job profile consists of programme planning and negotiation, creating and editing programme booklets, concert introductions, Nach(t)gesprächen and contributing content to press and public relations. Since 1988, he has held a lectureship in music history at the Hochschule für Musik in Berlin. His main focus is on early music history as well as special courses in church music and ancient music at St. Thomas von Aquin and for the German Bishops' Conference. From 1987 to 1989, he also worked together with Frank Müller from Magdeburg as carillonneur at the French Cathedral as well as at the Nikolaikirche. In 2003, he was appointed to the Jury Chöre des Landes Berlin, of which he was a member until 2015. Hiller is active as a lecturer and concert organist at home and abroad (concerts in Poland, the Czech Republic, France, Switzerland, Brazil, among others).

== Publications (selection) ==
Books

- Untersuchungen zu Robert Schumanns Auffassungen zum Problem der musikalischen Gattungen. Hochschulschrift (Phil. Diss.), Berlin 1984.
- Die Orgel im Schauspielhaus Berlin. Berlin 1990.

Articles

- Das Nationaltheater und die Anfänge der Berliner Mozart-Pflege. In Konzerthaus Berlin – Schauspielhaus am Gendarmenmarkt. Berlin 1994, pp. 43–51.
- Liturgy und Darbietung – Robert Schumanns Auffassungen über Kirchenmusik. In Schumann-Studien 3/4. Rat der Stadt Zwickau, Abteilung Kultur, cologne 1994, pp. 95ff.
- Orgeln in Brandenburg und Berlin. Magazin zum Orgelfestival. Potsdam: Kulturfeste im Land Brandenburg e. V. 2005.
- Felix Mendelssohn Bartholdy und die Sing-Akademie zu Berlin. In Felix Mendelssohn Bartholdys Wohn- und Wirkungsstätten, Vortragsreihe Frühjahr 2003, edited by Veronika Leggewie, Edition Linea classica Koblenz 2003, ISBN 3-9807515-1-1, pp. 7ff.
- Das 19 Jahrhundert bis zur Reichsgründung. Eine Porträt-Galerie. In Ingeborg Allihn, Wilhelm Poeschel (ed.): "Wie mit vollen Chören". 500 Jahre Kirchenmusik in Berlins historischer Mitte. ortus musikverlag, Beeskow 2010, ISBN 978-3-937788-19-7.
- Felix Mendelssohn Bartholdy, Johannes Brahms, Max Reger und das Schicksal der protestantischen Kirchenmusik im 19 Jahrhundert. In Weil sie die Seelen fröhlich macht. Protestantische Musikkultur seit Martin Luther. Edited by Cordula Timm-Hartmann, Verlag der Franckesche Stiftungen zu Halle 2012, Kataloge der Franckeschen Stiftungen 28, ISBN 978-3-447-06699-0.
- Plakativ und verborgen – Gedanken zur Präsenz des Luther-Chorals in der Musik des 19. und beginnenden 20 Jahrhunderts. In: Choral, Cantor, Cantus firmus. Die Bedeutung des lutherischen Kirchenliedes für die Schul- und Sozialgeschichte. Edited by Erik Dremel and Unte Poetzsch, Hallesche Forschungen 42, Verlag der Franckeschen Stiftungen, Halle 2015, ISBN 978-3-447-10387-9, pp. 151–158.

Essays and articles in journals

- Zum 300 Geburtstag des organ builder Zacharias Hildebrandt. In Musik und Gesellschaft, Jg. 38, No 10, 1988, pp. 524–526.
- Musik und Technik: Züge, Kombinationen und Setzer. Zur Entwicklung der Klangregistrierung auf der Orgel. In Musik und Gesellschaft 2/1989.
- Auf dem Weg zu einem bibelkundigen Publikum. Die Musik in den Oratorien Georg Friedrich Händels. In Bibel und Kirche 2/1993.
- Plädoyer für eine sinnvoll genutzte Saalorgel. In Orgel International. No 1, 1998, pp. 36–41.
- Wie ein "Paukenschlag". Die Klais-Orgel der St. Hedwig's Cathedral Berlin. In Musica sacra No 6, Regensburg 2014, pp. 364f.
- Stefan Heuckes‚ Deutsche Messe‘ op. 80. In Musica sacra No 04, Regensburg 2017.
- Adam’s Passion von Arvo Pärt und Robert Wilson. In Musica sacra No 04, Regensburg 2018.

Contributions to scientific conferences

- Schumanns Romantik-Auffassung und die Rolle der musikalischen Gattungen. In Robert-Schumann-Tage 1994, 9 Wissenschaftliche Arbeitstagung zu Fragen der Schumann-Forschung. Zwickau 1989, pp. 8–16.
- Karl Friedrich Fasch und die Gründung der Berliner Singakademie. In Studien zur Aufführungspraxis und Interpretation der Musik des 18 Jahrhunderts issue 41: Bericht über die wissenschaftliche Konferenz in Zerbst am 16. und 17 April 1988. Michaelstein bei Blankenburg 1989, ISBN 3-89512-093-6.
- Zur Darstellung französischer Orgelmusik auf der Trost-Orgel – Probleme und Vorschläge. In 250 Jahre Trost-Orgel in der Konzerthalle Schloßkirche Altenburg. Arbeitsmaterial zur wissenschaftlichen Großkonferenz Die Altenburger Trost-Orgel und ihre Bedeutung im Musikleben der Vergangenheit und Gegenwart am 30 September 1989. Rat der Stadt Altenburg mit dem Kulturbund der DDR, Altenburg 1989, pp. 9–14.
- together with Barbara Stühlmeyer: Hörpraxis und Aufführungspraxis der Musik der hl. Hildegard von Bingen. In Medievales 10. Actes du Colloque d'Études Medievales de l'Universite de Picardie-Jules Verne St-Riquier, 5-8 Decembre 1998. Amiens 2000, pp. 138–146.
- Plakativ und verborgen – Gedanken zur Präsenz des Luther-Chorals in der Musik des 19. und beginnenden 20. Jahrhunderts. (published in Choral, Cantor, Cantus firmus. Die Bedeutung des lutherischen Kirchenliedes für die Schul- und Sozialgeschichte. Verlag der Franckeschen Stiftungen Halle 2015.)
