= Grobniki =

- Location within Poland
- Coordinates: 50°11′48″N 17°52′19″E
- Country: Poland
- Voivodeship: Opole
- County: Głubczyce
- Gmina: Głubczyce
- Time zone: UTC+1 (CET)
  - Summer (DST): UTC+2 (CEST)
- Area code: +48 77
- Car plates: OGL

Grobniki [ɡrɔbˈniki] is a historical village located in Poland, in the Opole Voivodeship, Głubczyce County and Gmina Głubczyce.

== Notable residents ==
- Karl Proske (1794-1861)
