= Giovanni Tebaldini =

Italian composer, organist and musicologist

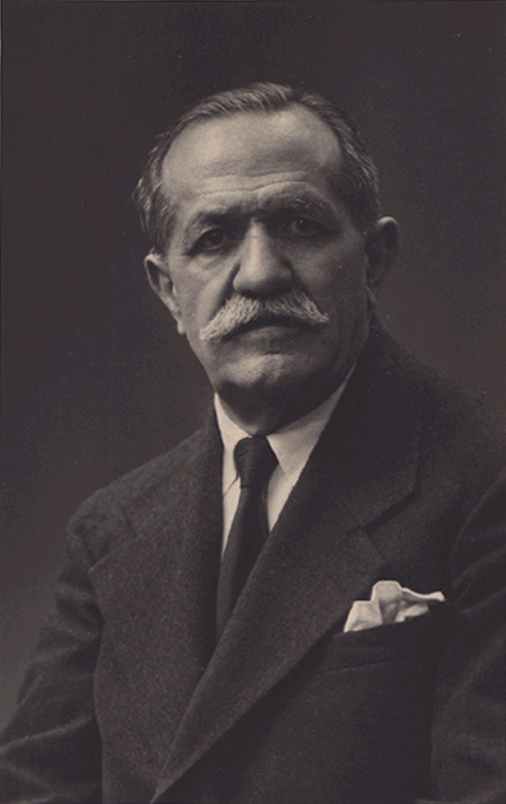
Giovanni Tebaldini.

Giovanni Tebaldini (7 September 1864 – 11 May 1952) was an Italian composer, organist and musicologist.

== Life ==
He studied with Amilcare Ponchielli at the Milan Conservatory and later with Franz Xaver Haberl in Regensburg. He was maestro di cappella in several Italian cities and later director of the Parma Conservatory and director of Santa Casa di Loreto.

== Compositions ==
=== Organ solo ===
- Trois Pièces d’Orgue (1896)

=== Theoretical works ===
- Metodo di studio per l’Organo moderno (1894)

=== Writings ===
- La musica sacra in Italia (1893)
- L’archivio musicale della Cappella antoniana in Padova (1895)
- La musica sacra nella storia e nella liturgia (1904)

== Sources ==
- Horwath, Michael (1970). Tebaldini, Gnecchi and Strauss. (in Italian).
- Pilati, Mario (1929). "Giovanni Tebaldini ". Bollettino bibliografico musicale. (in Italian).
- Untersteiner, Alfredo (1895). Giovanni Tebaldini e la riforma della musica da chiesa. (in Italian).
