= Albert Kopfermann =

German musicologist

Albert Kopfermann (15 January 1846 – 29 May 1914) was a German musicologist and librarian.

== Life ==
Born in Dortmund, Kopfermann studied jurisprudence, philology and musicology at the universities of Bonn, Berlin and Halle. In 1878 he was appointed Head of the music department of the Königliche Bibliothek in Berlin as successor of the deceased Franz Espagne and held this position until his death. His successor was Wilhelm Altmann.

He published some unknown works by Mozart and Beethoven.

Kopfermann died in Berlin at the age of 68.

== Publications ==
- Beethovens "Wasserträger", in Allgemeine Musikzeitung, 20th year (1893), p. 110 f.
- Ein unbekanntes Adagio von Beethoven, in Die Musik, 1st year (1901/02), issue 12 (1. Beethoven-Heft), pp. 1059–1061 (Digitalisat).
