= Franjo Dugan =

Croatian composer, organist and academic

- Born: 11 September 1874
- Died: 12 December 1948 (aged 74)
- Era: late Romantic, Cecilian movement
- Works: see Works

Franjo Dugan (11 September 1874 – 12 December 1948) was a prominent Croatian composer, organist, music critic and academic. Known for his late Romantic organ and choral works inspired by Croatian folklore, he was one of the leaders of the Cecilian Movement in the Catholic Church in Croatia.

== Biography ==
Born in 1874 in Krapinica near Zlatar, Dugan received his first lessons in organ from Vatroslav Kolander, organist in Zagreb Cathedral. After graduating in Classical Gymnasium in Zagreb in 1892 he went to Hochmusikschule in Berlin, where he graduated in 1908. His professors were Robert Kahn and Max Bruch. By returning to Croatia, he became a professor in Osijek and Zagreb (1921-1941), where he taught music theory, composition and organs.

He was choirmaster of the several choirs (Kolo, Sloga, Oratory choir of the St. Mark's Church) and the organist of the St. Mark's Church. He was one of the founders of the Cecilian movement in Croatia, harmonizing a vast number of Croatian folk chants. He was a member of the Croatian Academy of Sciences and Arts.

== Works ==
He composed in a late romantical style, relying on the Baroque polyphony. He was partially inspired by Croatian folklore, especially sacral traditions of the Hrvatsko zagorje, where he was born. He composed more than fifty vocal and instrumental (mostly for organs) music works.

=== Orchestral works ===
- Uvertira (Overture), 1985
- Simfonijski andante (Symphonical andante), 1908

=== Works for organ ===
- Šest fughetta, 1893
- Dva preludija, 1893
- Prélude et fugue in G-major, 1894.
- Dvije fuge, in c-minor and f-minor, 1894
- Kromatska fuga in c-minor, 1895.
- Toccata in g-minor, 1895.
- Fantazija (Fantasy), 1895.
- Preludij i fuga in H-major, 1908/09
- Božićna predigra, 1942

=== Scientific papers ===
- Elementarna teorija muzike (Elementary Theory of Music), 1922.
- Vježbe za zborno pjevanje 1923
- Nauka o muzičkim formama, 1932
- Nauka o instrumentima, 1936
- Akustika (Acustics), 1943
- Nauk o glasbalima, 1944
- Nauka o formama (left in manuscript)
