= Basilica of the Nativity of Our Lady, Regensburg =

Coordinates: 49°01′06″N 12°06′00″E

Basilica of the Nativity of Our Lady
- Basilika Unserer Lieben Frau Zur Alten Kapelle
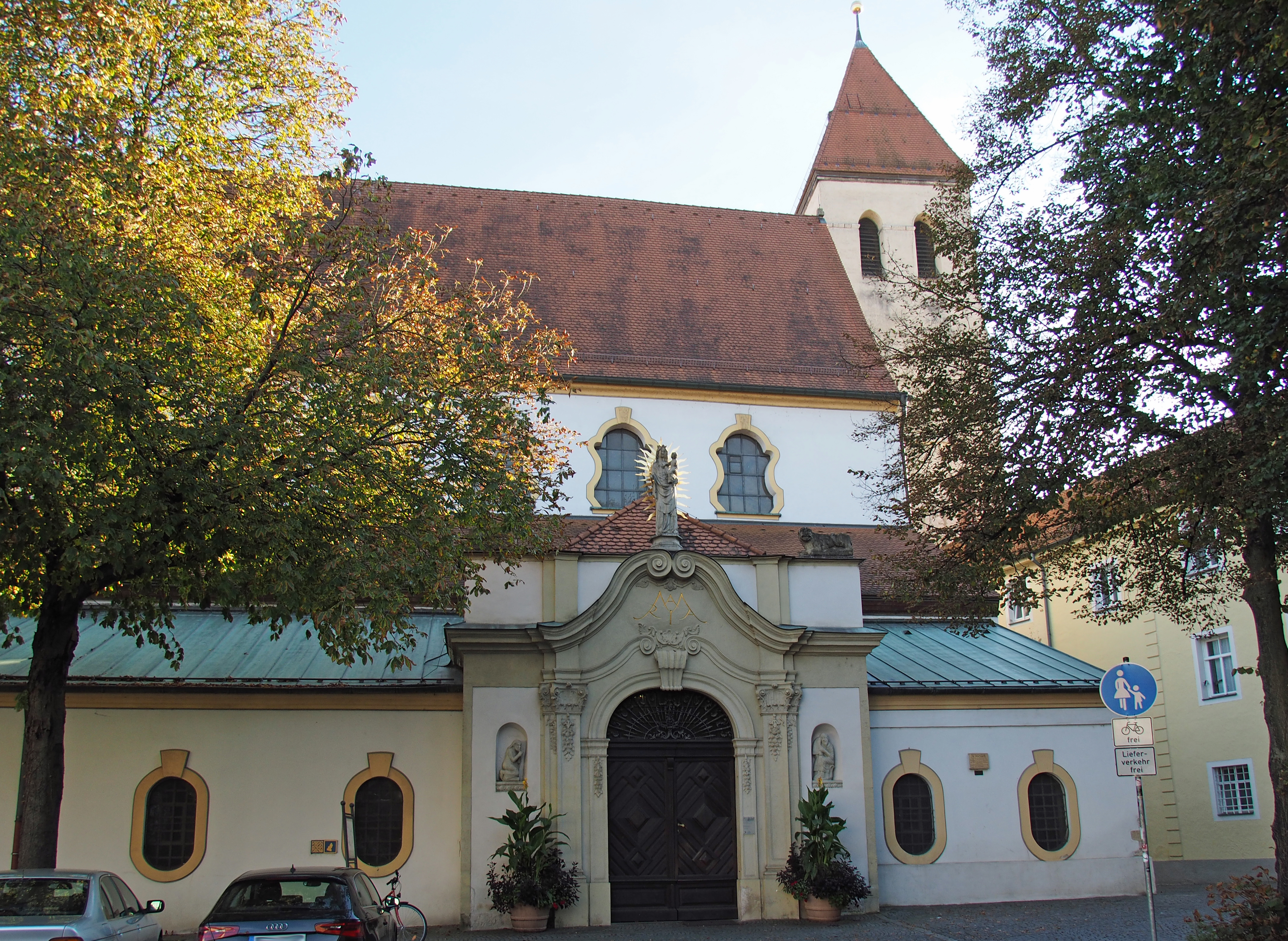

- Location within Bavaria Location within Germany
- Location: Regensburg
- Country: Germany
- Denomination: Roman Catholic Church

The Basilica of the Nativity of Our Lady also Basilica of the Nativity of Our Lady to the Ancient Chapel (German: Basilika Unserer Lieben Frau Zur Alten Kapelle ) or Alten Kapelle It is the oldest Catholic place of worship in Bavaria and one of the most important churches in the city of Regensburg, in the south of Germany.

The collegiate church and smaller basilica is part of an old abbey dedicated to the Virgin founded by the emperor Henry II, ruler of the Holy Roman Empire in the 1002. With a baroque style of the 18th century, it is one of the masterpieces of the rococo decoration in Europe, in the style dictated by the School of renown Wessobrunn.

A first chapel was built by order of Charlemagne in the place where, according to tradition, the Roman temple dedicated to Juno was built. The chapel which was built after the fall of the Roman Empire of the West seems to have been the oldest in Bavaria and this earned it the nickname "Alte Kappelle", the «Old Chapel».

In 1964, at the suggestion of Bishop Rudolf Graber, the Collegiate Church of Our Lady of the Old Chapel was elevated to a smaller basilica by Pope Paul VI.

== See also ==
- Roman Catholicism in Germany
- Nativity of Our Lady

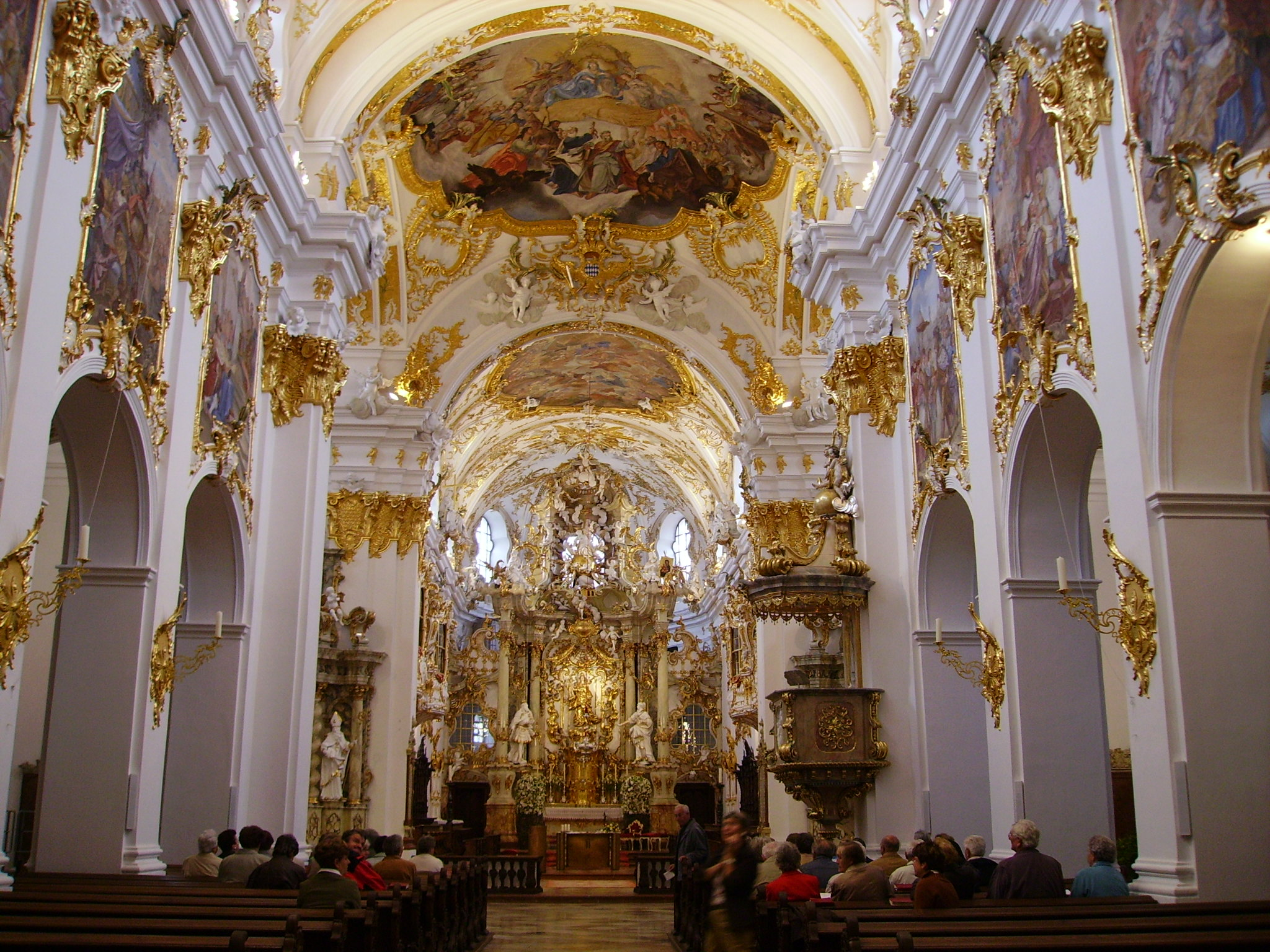
Internal view
