= Franz Espagne =

German musicologist

Franz Espagne (21 April 1828 – 24 May 1878) was a German musicologist and librarian.

== Life ==
Born in Münster, Espagne was a student of the 19th-century musicologist Siegfried Dehn in Berlin. In 1858 he was music director in Bielefeld for a short time. In the same year, after the untimely death of Dehn, he took over the management of the music department of the Königliche Bibliothek in Berlin. He held this office until his death. His successor was Albert Kopfermann.

He was also the choirmaster at St. Hedwig's Cathedral in Berlin. He made a name for himself as a collaborator on the complete editions of Beethoven and Palestrina published by Breitkopf & Härtel.

Espagne died in Berlin at age 50.

== Publications ==
- Verzeichnis sämmtlicher Werke Dr. Carl Loewe's ("Catalogue of the complete works of Dr. Carl Loewe"), Berlin 1870
