= Musica sacra =

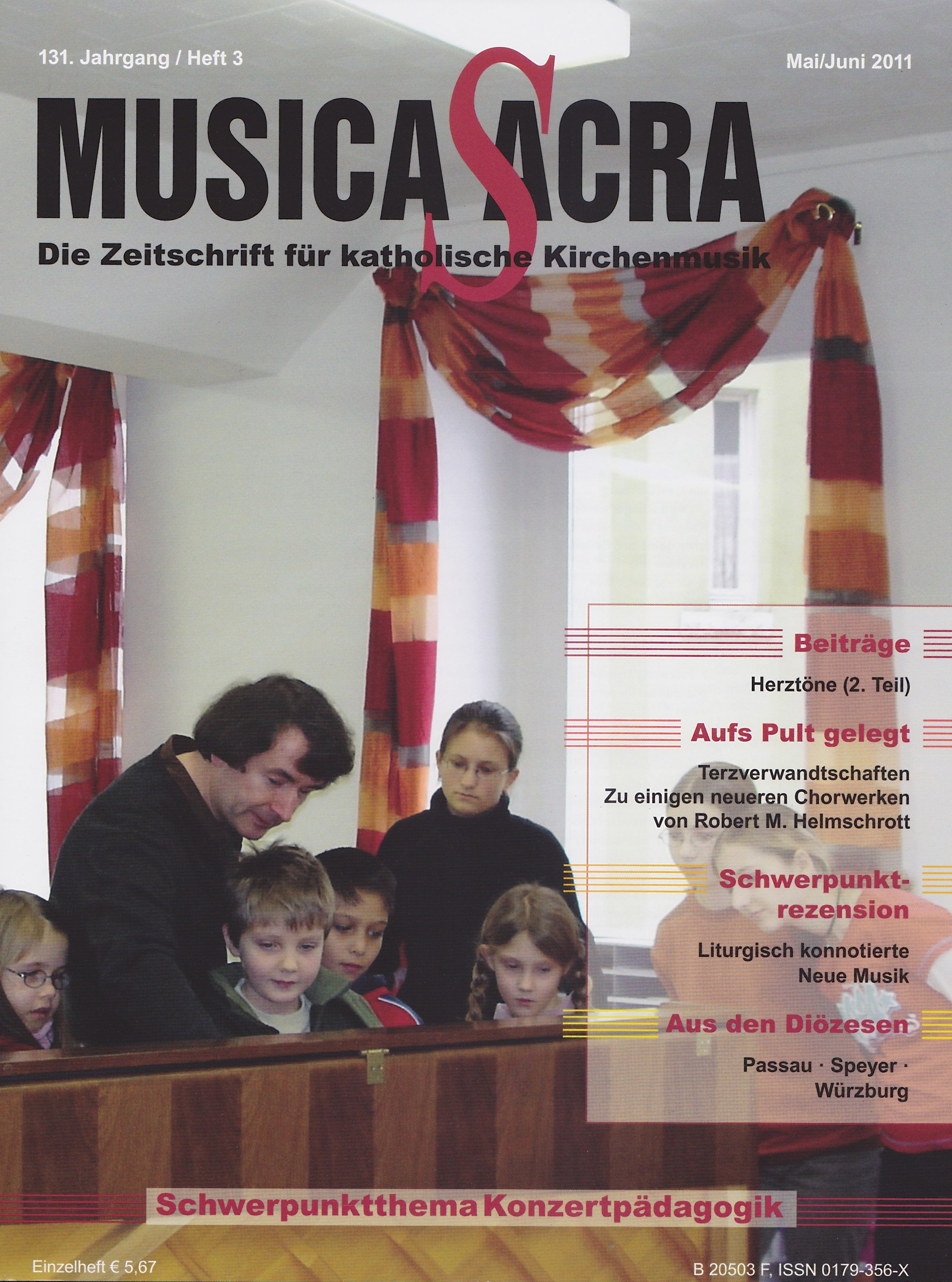
- Title page in May/June 2011
- Editor: Dominik Axtmann
- Categories: Catholic church music
- Frequency: bimonthly
- Publisher: Allgemeiner Cäcilien-Verband für Deutschland
- Total circulation: 3,500
- First issue: 1868
- Country: Germany
- Based in: Regensburg, Bavaria
- Language: German
- Website: www.musica-sacra-online.de
- ISSN: 0179-356X

Musica sacra is a magazine about sacred music, published by the Allgemeiner Cäcilien-Verband für Deutschland (ACV). It is the oldest trade paper for Catholic church music, especially liturgical music, still publishing in Germany. The magazine informs also about ecumenical perspectives in church music. Musica sacra reports events of the association, and news from other organisations, such as the Bundesverband katholischer Kirchenmusiker Deutschlands and the Pueri Cantores. Musica sacra appears six times per year, printed by Bärenreiter in Kassel in 3,500 copies.

== History ==
The magazine appeared first in 1868 as Musica sacra – Monatsschrift für Kirchenmusik und Liturgie by Franz Xaver Witt, a monthly paper. On the occasion of the centenary in 1968, the paper changed to bimonthly. More recently, an online-version was published, and topics have included reports from the practice of church music, news and information, reviews of recordings, sheet music and books, a calendar of events, composer's portraits, presentation of new organs, and open positions.
