= Violin Concerto No. 2 (Mozart) =

Violin concerto by W. A. Mozart

- by W. A. Mozart
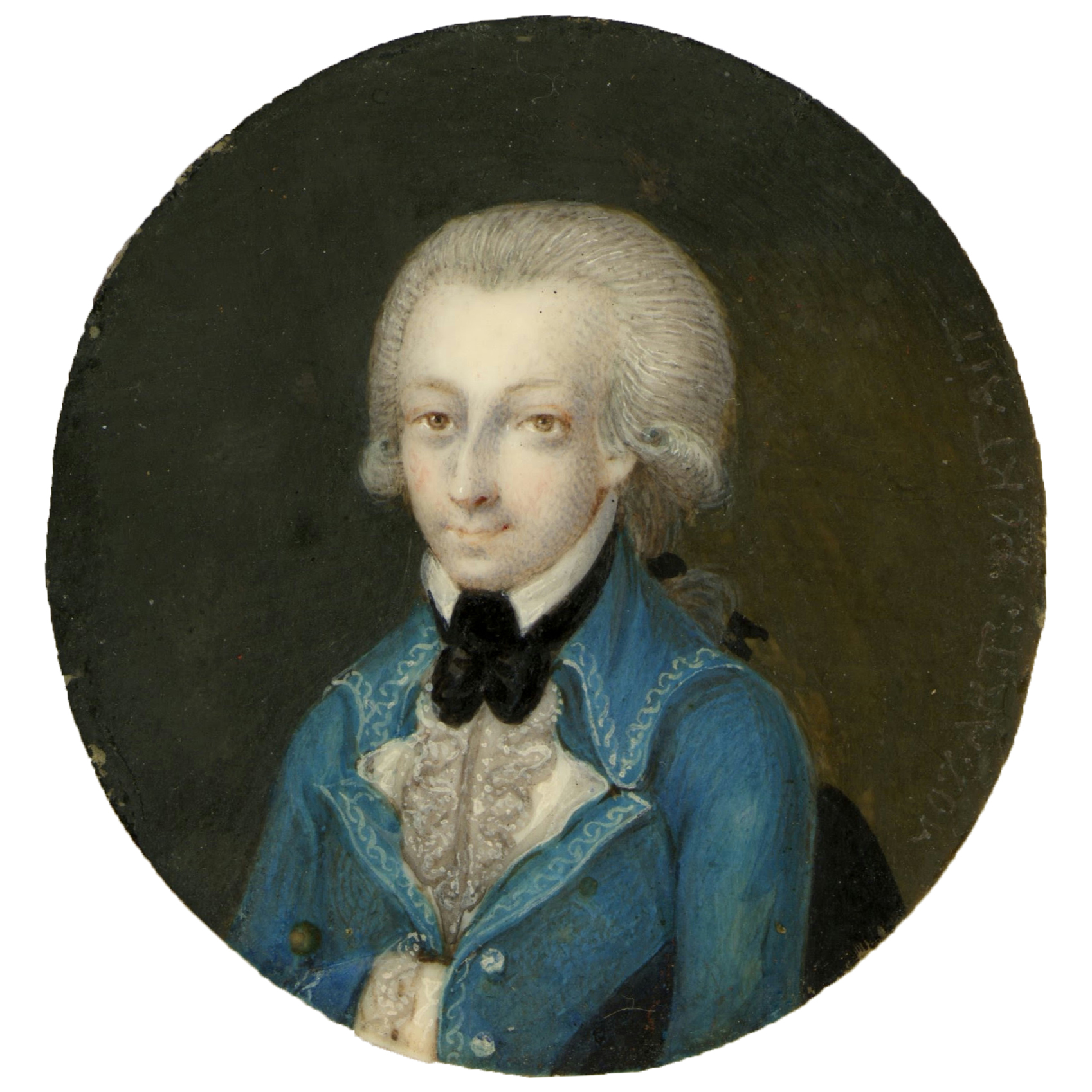
- 1773 miniature of Mozart
- Key: D major
- Catalogue: K. 211
- Composed: 1775
- Movements: 3
- Scoring: Violin; orchestra

Violin Concerto No. 2 in D major, K. 211 was composed by Wolfgang Amadeus Mozart in 1775. The concerto has the usual fast–slow–fast structure.

Stanley Sadie describes the first movement as uncharacteristic of Mozart, almost clumsily written and curiously old-fashioned. He points out that the last movement, a rondo in the style of a minuet, instead of bringing back the original thematic material at the end as would be expected, uses material from the second section.

== Structure ==
The movements of the work have the tempo indications :

1. Allegro moderato
2. Andante
3. Rondeau: Allegro

The concerto lasts around 20 minutes. It is scored for 2 oboes, 2 horns in D and strings.

Like the Violin Concerto No. 4, K. 218, and the Violin Concerto No. 5, K. 219, the codetta of the tutti exposition returns to close both the solo exposition and the recapitulation.
