= Allgemeiner Cäcilien-Verband für Deutschland =

German music organisation

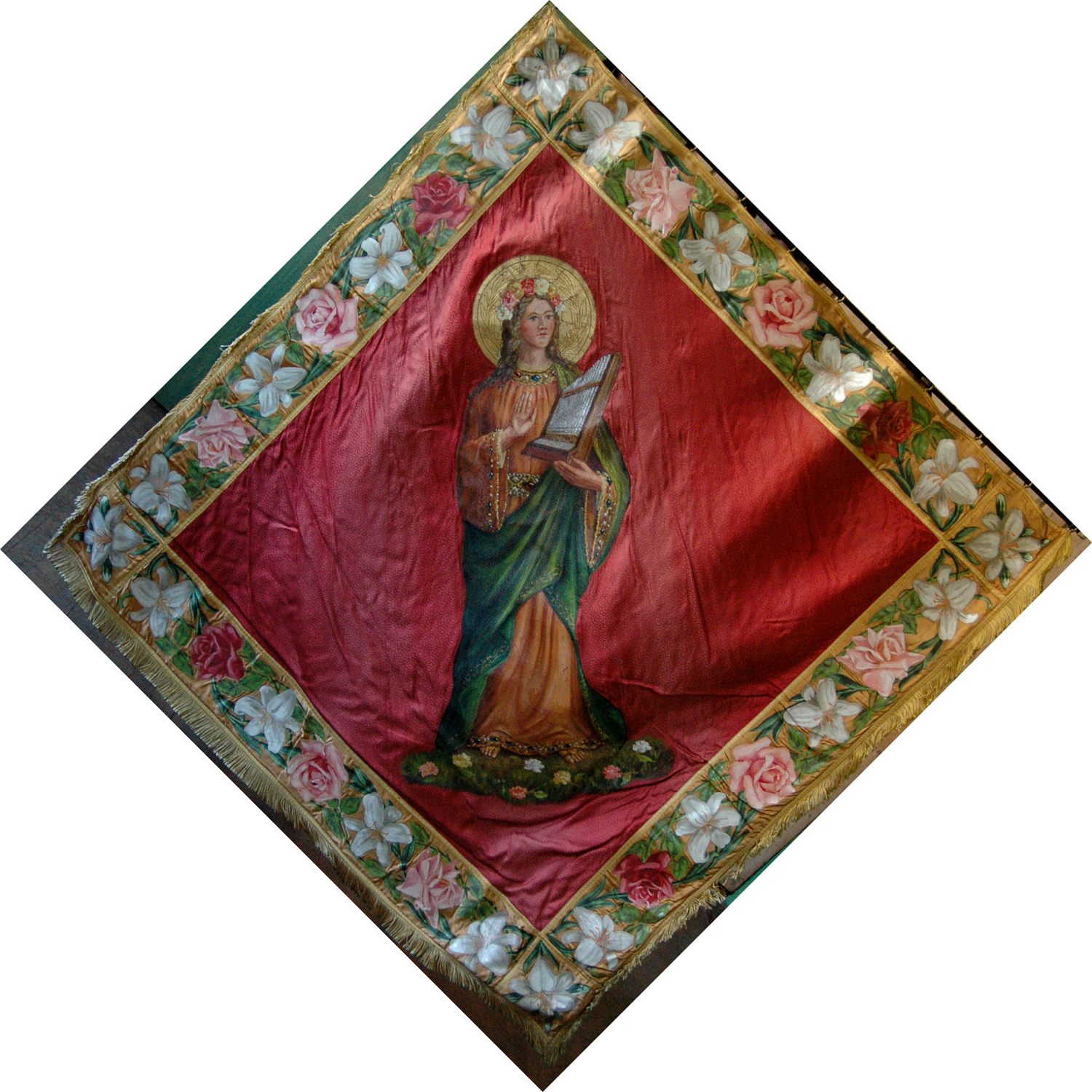
St. Cäcilie

The Allgemeiner Cäcilien-Verband für Deutschland (General Association of the Cecilian Movement Germany) (abbreviated as ACV) was founded in 1868 and is an organization for choral singing of the Catholic Church. The official residence of the ACV is located in Regensburg. Approved by Pope Pius IX in 1870, the organisation represents over 417,000 singers in over 18,000 choirs. The organisation is named after the Patron Saint of music, St. Cecilia. It awards the Palestrina-Medaille, Ambrosius-Medaille and Orlando di Lasso-Medaille, among others.

== Association ==
The ACV is a private church association and engaged in the German Bishops' Conference. In 1870, the association received the approbation by Pope Pius IX. In the founding breve Multum ad movendos animos of 16 December 1870 is not only the name of the association set as Associatio sub titulo Sanctae Caeciliae per universis Germanicae linguis Terris (General Cecilia Association for the countries of the German language), but also its international background and its legal position.

After the Second Vatican Council the organisation was divided in three national associations (Germany, Austria, Switzerland), however, they have worked together in the "Ständigen Konferenz der Allgemeinen Cäcilienverbände der Länder deutscher Sprache (SK-ACV)" (Standing Conference of Cecilia-Associations of German language).

The ACV promotes sacred church music through church music conferences and publications. The association offers suggestions for compositions and research. It is in contacts with the Protestant Church, Deutscher Musikrat (German Music Council) and the Arbeitsgemeinschaft Deutscher Chorverbände (Union of German choral associations). In 1951, the working group "Pueri Cantores" was founded.

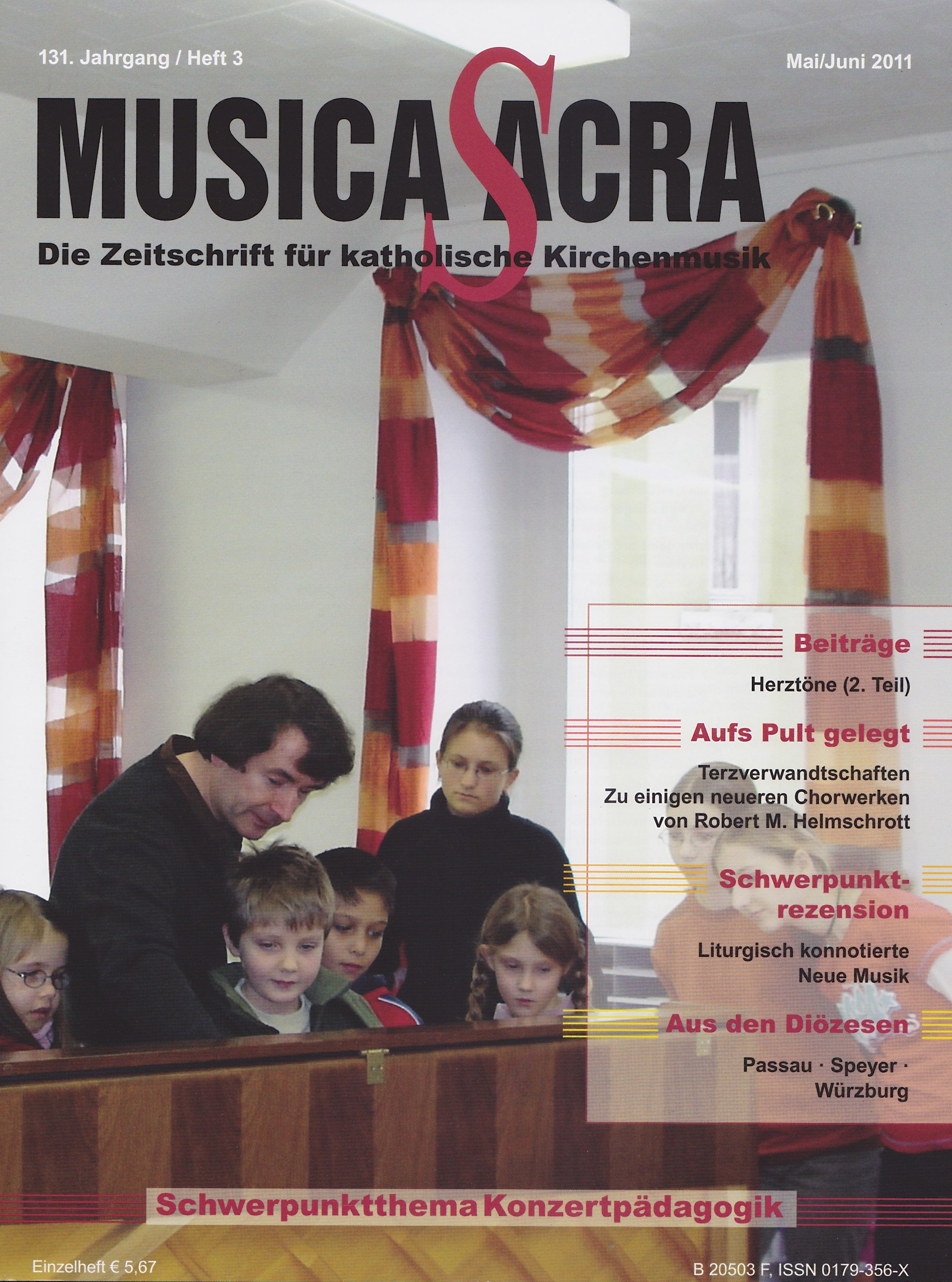
The magazine Musica sacra

The goal was worded by founder Franz Xaver Witt: "Wir wollen nichts anderes als die praktische Durchführung dessen befördern, was die Kirche über die Musik angeordnet hat" (We want to convey nothing more than the implementation of what the Church has arranged the music). The liturgy is to be kept free from distortions, protected from alienation and preserved in its original beauty.

The official association magazine of ACV is Musica sacra.

== Awards ==
The association awards medals and honours to members and choirs, among others:

- Cäcilienabzeichen, given to members for long-term activity
- Palestrina-Medaille (Palestrina medal), given to choirs on their 100th anniversary
- Ambrosius-Medaille (Ambrosius medal), given for unusual merits for choral singing in the Catholic church
- Orlando di Lasso-Medaille (Orlando di Lasso medal), the highest award for unusual merits
