= Karl Proske =

German Catholic cleric

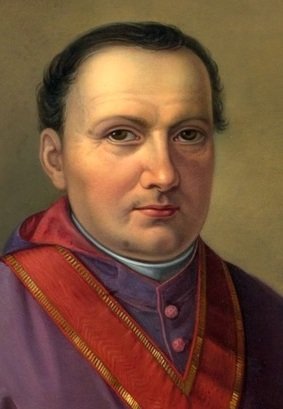
Karl Proske

Karl Proske (11 February 1794, Gröbnig (Upper Silesia) – 20 December 1861), was a German Catholic cleric, also known as Carolus Proske and Carl Proske.

== Life ==
In his youth, Proske was a medical doctor, and worked for the Prussian military during the 1813-15 engagement. In 1821 he entered the seminary, and was ordained in Regensburg on April 11, 1826. The following year, he was made a vicar choral of Regensburg Cathedral, a post he held for the rest of his life.

In 1830 he was made Canon and Kapellmeister of Regensburg cathedral.

== Musical work ==
In addition to his duties as a cleric, Proske devoted all his energies and spent his entire private income on the restoration of what he called "vere musica ecclesiae," the "true music of the Church." This he considered to be the ancient Gregorian chant and especially the polyphonic works of the Renaissance masters (such as Palestrina, Nanini, Marenzio, Lassus, etc.). He searched all throughout Germany and Italy, making many trips to Rome, in order to collect ancient manuscripts for his library, which grew to contain thousands of samples (Karl Weinmann, a late 19th-century music researcher, claimed there were over 30,000 pages of manuscripts before Proske died). Proske was a pioneer in the field, and the fact that his editions reflected only the German, Flemish, and Italian repertoires - excluding Spaniards for the most part, though he did include Victoria - does not diminish his amazing contributions to Sacred music.

Proske spent hours transcribing and arranging ancient polyphony, and rounded up the greatest singers in his city in order to have them sight-sing his newly copied manuscript to check for part-writing errors.

In 1853 Proske initiated the publication of his invaluable "Musica Divina", the fourth volume of which appeared in 1862 (finished by such prominent students as Franz Xaver Haberl). This was followed by a "Selectus Novus Missarum", in two volumes (1857–61).
