= Franz Xaver Witt =

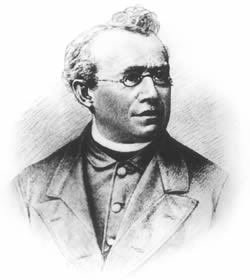
Franz Xaver Witt.

Franz Xaver Witt (February 9, 1834 – December 2, 1888) was a Catholic priest, church musician, and composer. He was a leading figure in the Cecilian movement for the reform of Catholic church music in the second half of the 19th century.

Witt was born in Walderbach, Bavaria. His father was a school teacher. Witt was taught piano and singing from a young age.

He studied theology and science at the seminary in Regensburg. He sang in the seminary's choir, which was under the direction of Joseph Schrems. He was ordained as a priest in 1856 and taught Gregorian chant at the seminary at Regensburg. In 1867 was appointed inspector of the seminary of St. Emmeram. In 1868 Witt founded the Caecilia Society in order to revive the use of Gregorian chant and polyphony, and to promote the composition of new liturgical music in an older style in Catholic churches. Pope Pius IX recognized the society in 1870. He died in Landshut.
