= List of compositions for cello and orchestra =

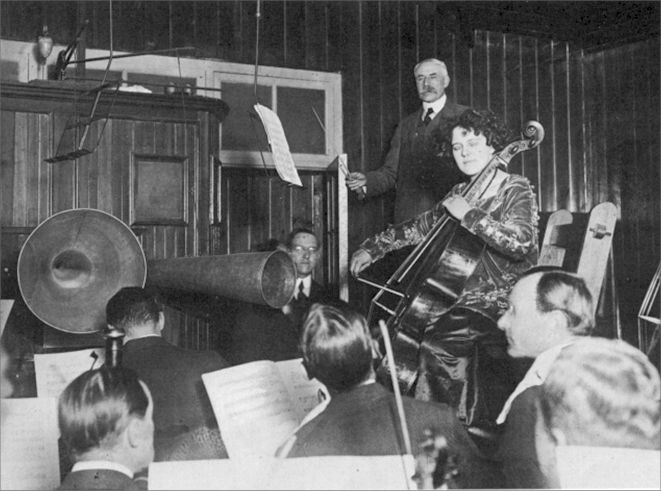
Elgar and Beatrice Harrison making the first (abridged) recording of Elgar's Cello Concerto (1920). Note the acoustic recording horns. Harrison would go on to make the first complete recording in 1928.

This is a list of compositions for cello and orchestra ordered by their authors' surnames.

== Cello concertos ==
=== A ===
- Torstein Aagaard-Nilsen
  - Cello Concerto (1996)
- Louis Abbiate
  - Cello Concerto (1895)
- Carl Friedrich Abel
  - Cello Concerto in B♭
  - Cello Concerto in C
- Hans Abrahamsen
  - Lied in Fall
- Thomas Adès
  - Lieux retrouvés (2016)
- Vasif Adigozalov
  - Cello Concerto (1990)
- Samuel Adler (b. 1928)
  - Concerto for Cello and Orchestra (1995)
- Jean-Louis Agobet
  - Cello Concerto (2009)
- Vladimir Agopov
  - Cello Concerto (1987)
- Miguel del Águila (b. 1957)
  - Concierto en Tango for Cello and Orchestra (2014)
- Kalevi Aho
  - Cello Concerto No. 1 (1983–84)
  - Cello Concerto No. 2 (2013)
- Ikram Akbarov
  - Cello Concerto (1990)
- Yasushi Akutagawa
  - Concerto ostinato for cello and orchestra (1969)
- Eugen d'Albert
  - Cello Concerto in C, Op. 20 (1899)
- Stephen Albert
  - Cello Concerto (1990)
- Redzhep Allayarov
  - Cello Concerto (1985)
- Pedro Humberto Allende Saron
  - Cello Concerto (1915)
- Ferid Alnar
  - Cello Concerto (1943)
- Franghiz Ali-Zadeh
  - Concerto for cello and orchestra (2000–2001)
- André Amellér
  - Concerto for cello and orchestra (1946), version for chamber orchestra (1963)
- Gilbert Amy
  - Cello Concerto (1999–2000)
- Tanya Anisimova
  - Adonai for Solo Cello and String Orchestra (2006)
  - Quintet Concerto for Solo Cello and String Quintet (2005)
- Denis ApIvor
  - Cello Concerto (1977)
- Johann Gottfried Arnold
  - Cello Concerto No. 1 in C
  - Cello Concerto No. 2 in G
  - Cello Concerto No. 3 in F
  - Cello Concerto No. 4 in E♭
  - Cello Concerto No. 5 in D
- Malcolm Arnold
  - Cello Concerto
- Alexander Arutiunian
  - Concertino for cello and orchestra (1971)
  - Poem for cello and orchestra (1974)
- Kurt Atterberg
  - Cello Concerto in C minor, Op. 21 (1922)
- Daniel-Francois-Esprit Auber
  - Air varié for cello and orchestra (1807)
  - 5 Concertos for Cello (c. 1809)
- Lera Auerbach
  - Diary of a Madman: Cello Concerto )2021)
- Pedro António Avondano
  - Cello Concerto in G (c. 1780)
- Vaja Azarashvili
  - Concerto for cello and chamber orchestra

=== B ===
- Arno Babajanian
  - Cello Concerto (1962)
- Grażyna Bacewicz
  - Cello Concerto No. 1 (1951)
  - Cello Concerto No. 2 (1963)
- Carl Philipp Emanuel Bach
  - Cello Concerto in A minor (1750)
  - Cello Concerto in B♭ major (1751)
  - Cello Concerto in A major (1753)
- Sven-Erik Bäck
  - Cello Concerto (1966)
- Nicolas Bacri
  - Cello Concerto (1987)
- Henk Badings
  - Cello Concerto No. 1 (1930)
  - Cello Concerto No. 2 (1939)
- David N. Baker
  - Concerto for Cello and Chamber Orchestra (1975) (Commissioned by Janos Starker)
  - Concerto for Cello and Jazz Band (1987) (Commissioned by Ed Laut)
- Leonardo Balada
  - Cello Concerto No. 1 (1962)
  - Cello Concerto No. 2 New Orleans (2001)
- Christopher Ball
  - Cello Concerto No. 1
  - Cello Concerto No. 2
- Alexander Baltin
  - Cello Concerto (1971)
- Gennady Banshchikov
  - Cello Concerto No. 1 (1962)
  - Cello Concerto No. 2 (1964)
  - Cello Concerto No. 3 (1965)
  - Cello Concerto No. 4 for cello and 11 instruments Duodeciment (1966)
- Granville Bantock
  - Sapphic Poem for cello and orchestra (1909)
- George Barati
  - Cello Concerto (1953)
- Samuel Barber
  - Cello Concerto in A minor, Op. 22 (1945)
- Béla Bartók
  - Cello Concerto (arrangement of the Viola Concerto by Tibor Serly – 1945)
  - Rhapsody 1
- Leonid Bashmakov
  - Cello Concerto (1972)
- Veniamin Basner
  - Cello Concerto (1989)
- Stanley Bate
  - Cello Concerto (1953)
- Mason Bates
  - Cello Concerto (2014)
- Carola Bauckholt
  - Brunnen (2013)
- Jerzy Bauer
  - Cello Concerto No. 1 (1985)
  - Cello Concerto No. 2 (2013)
- Arnold Bax
  - Cello Concerto in G minor (1932)
- Sally Beamish
  - Cello Concerto No. 1: River (1997)
  - Suite for cello and orchestra (after C. Debussy)
  - The Song Gatherer: Cello Concerto no. 2
- Stephen W. Beatty
  - Five Cello Concertos (2014-6)
- Louis-Noël Belaubre
  - Concerto for cello and strings after Boccherini's sonata in C
- Gustaf Bengtsson
  - Cello Concerto (1932)
- Paul Ben-Haim
  - Concerto
- Richard Rodney Bennett
  - Sonnets to Orpheus (1978–79)
- Pascal Bentoiu
  - Cello Concerto (1989)
- Niels Viggo Bentzon
  - Cello Concerto No. 1 (1956)
  - Cello Concerto No. 2 (1974)
  - Cello Concerto No. 3 (1982)
- Esteban Benzecry
  - Concertino for cello and strings (1992)
  - Cello Concerto (2013)
- Wilhelm Georg Berger
  - Cello Concerto (1967)
- Erik Bergman
  - Cello Concerto
  - Concerto for Cello and String Orchestra Op. 141 (1998)
- Luciano Berio
  - Ritorno degli snovidenia (The Return of Dreams 1977)
- Michael Berkeley
  - Cello Concerto (1983)
- Leonard Bernstein
  - Three Meditations from Mass for cello and orchestra (1977)
- Charles Roland Berry
  - Cello Concerto (published 2008)
- Boris Blacher
  - Cello Concerto (1964)
- David Blake
  - Cello Concerto (1992)
- Howard Blake
  - Diversions for cello and orchestra (1985)
- Marc Bleuse
  - Cello Concerto (1993)
- Arthur Bliss
  - Cello Concerto F 107 (1970)
- Ernest Bloch
  - Schelomo, Rhapsodie Hébraïque for cello solo and large orchestra (1916)
  - Voice in the Wilderness (1936)
- Luigi Boccherini
  - Cello Concerto No. 1 in C major, G. 477
  - Cello Concerto No. 2 in D major, G. 479
  - Cello Concerto No. 3 in G major, G. 480
  - Cello Concerto No. 4 in C major, G. 481
  - Cello Concerto No. 5 in E♭ major, G. 474
  - Cello Concerto No. 6 in A major, G 475
  - Cello Concerto No. 7 in D major, G. 476
  - Cello Concerto No. 8 in D major, G. 478
  - Cello Concerto No. 9 in B♭ major, G. 482
  - Cello Concerto in B♭ major (arr. F. Grutzmacher)
  - Cello Concerto No. 10 in D major, G. 483
  - Cello Concerto No. 11 in C major, G. 573
  - Cello Concerto No. 12 in E♭ major
- Léon Boëllmann
  - Variations Symphoniques, Op. 23
- Joseph Bodin de Boismortier
  - Cello Concerto Op. 26, No. 6 (published 1729)
- Max Bohrer
  - Cello Concerto No. 1 (c. 1819)
- Nimrod Borenstein
  - Concerto for violoncello and string orchestra opus 56b (2012)
  - Cello concerto No. 2 opus 77 (2017)
- Lilcho Borisov
  - Cello Concerto (1984)
- Pavel Bořkovec
  - Cello Concerto (1952)
- Sergei Bortkiewicz
  - Cello Concerto, Op. 20 (1915)
  - Three Pieces for cello and orchestra, Op. 25A: (1922)
- Daniel Börtz
  - Concerto for cello and strings (1980)
- Henriëtte Bosmans
  - Cello Concerto No. 1 (1922)
  - Poème voor violoncel en orkest (1923)
  - Cello Concerto No. 2 (1924)
  - Poème (1926)
- Antoon Bouman
  - Cello Concerto No. 1 (1882)
- Hendrik Bouman
  - Cello Concerto in A minor for cello and strings (2005)
- York Bowen
  - Rhapsody for Cello and Orchestra, Op. 74 (c. 1924)
- George Frederick Boyle
  - Cello Concerto (1917)
- Eugène Bozza
  - Cello Concerto (1947)
- Joly Braga Santos
  - Cello Concerto (1987)
- Charlotte Bray
  - Falling in the Fire (2015)
- Thérèse Brenet
  - Le Retour De Quetzalcoatl, symphonic poem for cello and orchestra (1995)
  - Concerto for cello and small orchestra (2010)
- Jean-Baptiste Bréval
  - Cello Concerto No. 1, A, Op. 14 (1784)
  - Cello Concerto No. 2, D, Op. 17 (1784)
  - Cello Concerto No. 3, F, Op. 20 (1785)
  - Cello Concerto No. 4, C, Op. 22 (1786)
  - Cello Concerto No. 5, Op. 24 (1786)
  - Cello Concerto No. 6, C, Op. 26 (1786)
- Havergal Brian
  - Cello Concerto in E♭ (1964)
- Frank Bridge
  - Oration, concerto elegiaco for cello and orchestra (1930)
  - Suite for cello and orchestra (orch. Robert Cornford, 1982)
- Benjamin Britten
  - Cello Symphony, Op. 68 (1963)
- Dirk Brossé
  - Elegy For Cello and Strings (1994)
  - Double concerto for Cello and Clarinet (2000)
  - Concerto for Isabelle (2015)
- Tobias Broström
  - Cello Concerto (2013)
- Alexander Brott
  - Cello Concerto Evocative Provocations (1975)
- Stephen Brown
  - Concerto for Two Cellos in G minor, "The Big Twin" (2016)
- Max Bruch
  - Kol Nidrei, Op. 47 (late 1880)
  - Canzone, Op. 55 (about 1891)
  - Adagio after Celtic themes, Op. 56 (c. 1891)
  - Ave Maria, Op. 61 (1892)
- Fritz Brun
  - Cello Concerto (1947)
- Joanna Bruzdowicz
  - Cello Concerto The Cry of the Phoenix (1994)
- Gavin Bryars
  - Cello Concerto (1995)
- Rudolph Bubalo
  - Concerto for cello and chamber orchestra (1992)
- Gunnar Bucht
  - Cello Concerto No. 1 (1954)
  - Cello Concerto No. 2 (1990)
- Julius Bürger
  - Cello Concerto (1938)
- Geoffrey Burgon
  - Cello Concerto (2007)
- William Busch
  - Cello Concerto (1941)
- Geoffrey Bush
  - Sinfonietta Concertante (1943)

=== C ===
- Antonio Caldara
  - Cello Concerto in D minor
- Roger Calmel
  - Cello Concerto (1968)
- Édith Canat de Chizy
  - Moïra (1998)
- André Caplet
  - Epiphanie for cello and orchestra (1923)
- Dumitru Capoianu
  - Cello Concerto (2001)
- David Carlson
  - Cello Concerto No. 1 (1979) (Carl Fischer Music)
  - Cello Concerto No. 2 for cello and 15 strings (1997) (Carl Fischer Music)
- Elliott Carter
  - Cello Concerto (2000)
- Robert Casadesus
  - Cello Concerto (1947)
- André Casanova
  - Cello Concerto (1983)
- Alfredo Casella
  - Cello Concerto (1934–35)
- Philip Cashian
  - Concerto for cello and Strings (2012)
- John Casken
  - Cello Concerto (1991)
- Gaspar Cassadó
  - Cello Concerto in D minor (1926)
- Joseph Castaldo
  - Cello Concerto (1995)
- Mario Castelnuovo-Tedesco
  - Cello Concerto, Op. 72 in G minor (1935)
- Manuel Castillo
  - Cello Concerto
- Ricardo Castro
  - Cello Concerto (1895)
- Yi Chen
  - Eleanor's Gift concerto for cello and orchestra (1999)
- Friedrich Cerha
  - Konzert (1989-1996)
- Shirvani Chalayev
  - Cello Concerto No. 1 (1970)
  - Cello Concerto No. 2 (1975)
- Carlos Chávez
  - Cello Concerto (unfinished, 1975)
- Gordon Shi-Wen Chin
  - Cello Concerto No. 1 (2006)
- Unsuk Chin
  - Cello Concerto (2009/2013)
- Giovanni Battista Cirri
  - Six cello concertos (Op. 14, Nos. 1–6)
- Walter Civitareale
  - Cello Concerto (1986)
- Anna Clyne
  - DANCE for cello and orchestra (2019)
- Samuel Coleridge-Taylor
  - Fantasiestücke 1907
- Guillaume Connesson
  - Cello Concerto (2008)
- Dinos Constantinides
  - Cello Concerto China IV-Shenzhen (1992)
- Barry Conyngham
  - Concerto for cello and strings (1984)
- Arnold Cooke
  - Cello Concerto (1973)
- Frank Corcoran
  - Cello Concerto (2014)
- Ronald Corp
  - Cello Concerto (2014)
- François Couperin-Paul Bazelaire
  - Pieces en concert for Cello and Strings
- Jean Cras
  - Légende (1929)
- Lyell Cresswell
  - Cello Concerto (1984)
- Gordon Crosse
  - Ceremony for Cello and Orchestra op19 (1966)
  - Cello Concerto (1979)
- César Cui
  - Deux morceaux Op. 36 (1886)
- Andrzej Cwojdziński
  - Cello Concerto No. 1 (1965)
  - Cello Concerto No. 2 (1968)
  - Cello Concerto No. 3 (1993)

=== D ===
- Marc-André Dalbavie
  - Cello Concerto (2013)
- Luigi Dallapiccola
  - Dialoghi (1960)
- Peter Maxwell Davies
  - Strathclyde Concerto No. 2 (1987)
- Karl Davydov
  - Cello Concerto No. 1 in B minor, Op. 5 (1859)
  - Cello Concerto No. 2 in A minor, Op. 14 (1863)
  - Cello Concerto No. 3 in D, Op. 18 (1868)
  - Cello Concerto No. 4 in E minor, Op. 31 (1878)
- Richard Danielpour
  - Cello Concerto No. 1 (1990)
  - Cello Concerto No. 2 – Through the Ancient Valley (2001)
- Franz Danzi
  - Cello Concerto G
  - Cello Concerto A major
  - Cello Concerto E minor
  - Variations on Mozart's "Là ci darem la mano" from Don Giovanni
- Michael Daugherty
  - Tales of Hemingway (2015)
- Brett Dean
  - Cello Concerto (2018)
- Dan Dediu
  - Cello Concerto (2019)
- Thomas de Hartmann
  - Cello Concerto Op. 57
  - Concerto d'après un cantate de Bach fro Cello and strings Op.73
- Théo De Joncker
  - Cello Concerto
- Frederick Delius
  - Cello Concerto (1921)
  - Caprice and Elegy (1930)
- Louis Delune
  - Cello Concerto (published 1927)
- Edison Denisov
  - Cello Concerto, Op. 44 (1972)
  - Variations on Haydn's Canon "Death is a Long Sleep" for cello and orchestra (1982)
- Gion Antoni Derungs
  - Cello Concerto (2004)
- Pavle Dešpalj
  - Concerto for cello and string orchestra (2001)
- Alon Deutsch
  - Cello Concerto (2018)
- Bernd Richard Deutsch
  - Cello Concerto (2019)
- Frédéric Devreese
  - Concertino for cello, bandoneón and string orchestra (1998)
  - Concerto for cello and orchestra (1999)
- David Diamond
  - Cello Concerto (1938)
  - Kaddish for cello and orchestra (1987)
- Bernard van Dieren
  - Elegy for cello and orchestra (c. 1910)
- Albert Dietrich
  - Cello Concerto in G minor, Op. 32
- Carl Ditters von Dittersdorf
  - Cello Concerto D
- Paul-Heinz Dittrich
  - Concerto for cello, string quartet and orchestra (1975)
- Georgy Dmitriev
  - Cello Concerto (1968)
- Ernst von Dohnányi
  - Konzertstück, Op. 12 (1904)
- Cornelis Dopper
  - Cello Concerto (1910,1923)
- Antal Doráti
  - Cello Concerto (1977)
- Friedrich Dotzauer
  - Cello Concerto in B minor
  - Cello Concerto in F♯ minor
- Dimitris Dragatakis
  - Cello Concerto (1972)
- Pierre Max Dubois
  - Cello Concerto (1958)
- Vernon Duke
  - Cello Concerto (1945)
- Jean-Louis Duport
  - 6 cello concertos (No. 4 in E minor, 5 in D major, 6 in D minor)
- Pascal Dusapin
  - Cello Concerto Celo (1996)
  - Cello Concerto Outscape (2016)
- Henri Dutilleux
  - Cello Concerto Tout un monde lointain... (1970)
- Antonín Dvořák
  - Cello Concerto in A major, orchestrated by Jarmil Burghauser (1865)
  - Cello Concerto in B minor, Op. 104 (1894–1895)
  - Rondo in G minor, Op. 94, B.181 (1893)
  - Silent Woods, Op. 68, No. 5, B.182 (1893)
- George Dyson
  - Prelude, Fantasy and Chaconne for cello and orchestra (1936)

=== E ===
- Sixten Eckerberg
  - Cello Concerto (1973)
- Karl Anton Eckert
  - Cello Concerto (c. 1869)
- René Eespere
  - Cello Concerto Concertatus Celatus (2004)
- Klaus Egge
  - Cello Concerto, Op. 29 (1966) ()
- Werner Egk
  - Canzona for cello and orchestra (1982)
- Halim El-Dabh
  - The Invisible Bridge: Concerto for Cello and Orchestra (2007)
- Edward Elgar
  - Cello Concerto in E minor, Op. 85 (1918–1919)
- Jose Elizondo
  - Unter dem Sternenhimmel des Rheins (Under the starry sky of the Rhine) (2020)
  - Legende des edlen Ritters (The legend of the noble knight) (2020)
  - Danzas Latinoamericanas (Latin American Dances) (1997)
  - Otoño en Buenos Aires (Autumn in Buenos Aires) (1997)
  - Pan de Azúcar (Sugar Loaf mountain) (1997)
  - Atardecer Tapatío (Sunset in Guadalajara) (1997)
  - La alborada de la esperanza (The Dawn of Hope) (2018)
  - Limoncello (2018)
  - Crepúsculos (Twilights) (2018)
- David Ellis
  - Cello Concerto (1977 rev. 2004)
- Jens Laursøn Emborg
  - Cello Concerto (1949)
- George Enescu
  - Sinfonia Concertante in B minor, Op. 8 (1901)
- Einar Englund
  - Cello Concerto (1954)
- Péter Eötvös
  - Cello Concerto Grosso (2010-2011)
- Frederic d'Erlanger
  - Andante Symphonique for Cello and Orchestra, Op. 18 (1903)
  - Ballade for Cello and Orchestra (1926)
- Iván Erőd
  - 3 movements for Cello and Chamber Orchestra, Op. 7 (12 min) (1958)
  - Cello Concerto for Cello and Orchestra, Op. 80 (25 min) (2005)
- Francisco Escudero
  - Cello Concerto (1971)
- Andrei Eshpai
  - Concerto for cello and orchestra (1989) (Dedicated to Mstislav Rostropovich.) (20 min)

=== F ===
- Sebastian Fagerlund
  - Nomade – Concerto for Cello and Orchestra
- Mohammed Fairouz
  - Akhnaten, Dweller in Truth for cello and orchestra (2011)
  - Cello Concerto Desert Sorrows (2015)
- Gabriel Fauré
  - Elegie for Cello and Orchestra (1880)
- Ivan Fedele
  - Concerto for cello and orchestra (1996)
  - Imaginary Depth for cello and chamber orchestra (1997)
  - Est!, Concerto No. 2 for cello and small orchestra (2004–2005)
- Jindřich Feld
  - Cello Concerto (1958)
- Morton Feldman
  - Cello and Orchestra, for Siegfried Palm (1972)
- Václav Felix
  - Cello Concerto (1990)
- John Fernström
  - Cello Concerto (1940)
- Francesco Filidei
  - Ogni Gesto d'Amore (2009)
- Anton Fils
  - Cello Concerto in B♭
  - Cello Concerto in F
- Vivian Fine
  - Chamber Concerto for cello and six instruments (1966)
- Gerald Finzi
  - Cello Concerto in A minor, Op. 40 (1955)
- Craciane Finzi
  - Errance dans la nuit
- Nicola Fiorenza
  - Cello Concerto in A minor
  - Cello Concerto in B♭
  - Cello Concerto in F
- Elena Firsova
  - Cello Concerto No. 1, Op. 10 (1973)
  - Cello Concerto No. 2, Op. 26 (Chamber Concerto No. 2) (1982)
  - Cello Concerto No. 3, Op. 78 (Chamber Concerto No. 5) (1996)
  - Cello Concerto No. 4, Op. 122 (Concerto-Elegy) (2008)
- Nenad Firšt
  - Cello Concerto (1994)
- Jerzy Fitelberg
  - Cello Concerto (1931)
- Wilhelm Fitzenhagen
  - Concerto for Cello and Orchestra No. 1, in B minor (1870)
  - Concerto Fantastique, for Cello and Orchestra No. 2, in A minor (1871)
  - Concerto for Cello and Orchestra No. 3, in A minor
- Kjell Flem
  - Cello Concerto (2005)
- Lukas Florczak
  - Cello Concerto (2019)
- Jean-Louis Florentz
  - Cello Concerto Le Songe de Lluc Alcari (1996)
- Franz Flössner
  - Cello Concerto Op. 20
- Urs Joseph Flury
  - Cello Concerto (1977)
- Josef Bohuslav Foerster
  - Cello Concerto (1930)
- Juliette Folville (1870–1946)
  - Concertstuck pour Violoncelle (Concert piece for cello) and orchestra (1905)
  - Triptych for cello and orchestra (manuscript)
- Arthur Foote (1853–1937)
  - Cello Concerto in G minor, Op. 33 (1894)
- Carlo Forlivesi
  - Lauda (2007), Cello Concerto (for Anssi Karttunen)
- Lukas Foss
  - Cello Concerto (1966)
- John Foulds
  - Lento e Scherzetto, Op. 12 (about 1906)
  - Cello Concerto in G major, Op. 17 (1908–09)
- Malcolm Forsyth
  - Cello Concerto Electra Rising (1995)
- Wolfgang Fortner
  - Concerto for Cello and orchestra (1951)
  - Zyklus for Cello and Chamber Orchestra without strings (1970)
- Paolo Fradiani
  - Cello Concerto (2024)
- Cheryl Frances-Hoad
  - Cello Concerto (2022)
- Luca Francesconi
  - Rest, Concerto for cello and orchestra (2003)
  - Unexpected End of Formula, for cello, ensemble and electronics (2008)
  - Das Ding singt (2017)
- Auguste Franchomme
  - Cello Concerto No. 1 (1846)
- Jacques Franco-Mendès
  - Grand Cello Concerto No. 3 (c. 1879)
- John Frandsen
  - Cello Concerto Hymn to the Ice Queen (1998)
- Jan Freidlin
  - Concerto for cello, string orchestra and vibraphone (1994)
- Gunnar de Frumerie
  - Cello Concerto (1984)
- Dai Fujikura
  - Cello Concerto (2017)
- Charles Fussell
  - Right River (Variations for cello and string orchestra)

=== G ===
- Bogdan Gagić
  - Cello Concerto (1987)
- Renaud Gagneux
  - Triptyque (Cello Concerto No. 1 1990)
  - Cello Concerto No. 2 (1999)
- Hans Gal
  - Cello Concerto (1944)
- Moritz Ganz
  - Cello Concerto No. 2 (published 1836)
- Celso Garrido-Lecca
  - Cello Concerto (1994)
- John Garth
  - Cello Concerto No. 1 in D (1760)
  - Cello Concerto No. 2 in B♭ (1760)
  - Cello Concerto No. 3 in A (1760)
  - Cello Concerto No. 4 in B♭ (1760)
  - Cello Concerto No. 5 in D minor (1760)
  - Cello Concerto No. 6 in G (1760)
- Fritz Geißler
  - Cello Concerto (1974)
  - Cello Concertino (1981)
- Jiří Gemrot
  - Cello Concerto (1984)
  - Concertino for cello, piano and orchestra (2004)
  - Concerto for cello and chamber orchestra (2009)
  - Lamento for cello and string orchestra (2012)
- Harald Genzmer
  - Cello Concerto (1950)
  - Concerto for Cello and Winds (1969)
- Friedrich Gernsheim
  - Cello Concerto in E minor, Op. 78 (1907)
- Stefano Gervasoni
  - Heur, leurre, leuer for cello and orchestra (2013)
- Alberto Ginastera
  - Cello Concerto No. 1, Op. 36 (1968)
  - Cello Concerto No. 2, Op. 50 (1980)
- Suzanne Giraud
  - Concert (2004)
- Paul Glass
  - Cello Concerto (1961)
- Philip Glass
  - Concerto for Cello and Orchestra
  - Cello Concerto No. 2 – Naqoyqatsi
- Alexander Glazunov
  - Concerto-ballata in C, Op. 108 (1931)
  - Chant du ménestrel, Op. 71 (1901)
- Reinhold Glière
  - Cello Concerto in D minor, Op. 87 (1946)
- Alexander Goehr
  - Romanza for cello and orchestra, Op. 24 (1968)
- Daniël van Goens
  - Cello Concerto No. 1 in A minor (1886/7)
  - Cello Concerto No. 2 in D minor (published 1901)
- Berthold Goldschmidt
  - Cello Concerto (1953–54)
- Edmunds Goldšteins
  - Cello Concerto (1963)
- Marin Goleminov
  - Cello Concerto No. 1 (1946)
  - Cello Concerto No. 2 (1984)
- Jani Golob
  - Cello Concerto (2001)
- Georg Goltermann
  - Cello Concerto No. 1 in A minor, Op. 14
  - Cello Concerto No. 2 in D minor, Op. 30
  - Cello Concerto No. 3 in B minor, Op. 51
  - Cello Concerto No. 4 in G major, Op. 65
  - Cello Concerto No. 5 in D minor, Op. 76
    - (total of 8 Cello Concerti)
- Evgeny Golubev
  - Cello Concerto in D minor, Op. 41 (1956)
- Geoffrey Gordon
  - Concerto For Cello And Orchestra (after Thomas Mann's Doktor Faustus) (2013)
- Ida Gotkovsky
  - Cello Concerto (1980)
- Hermann Graedener
  - Cello Concerto No. 1 (published 1908)
  - Cello Concerto No. 2 (1912)
- Paul Graener
  - Cello Concerto (published 1927)
- Friedrich Hartmann Graf
  - Cello Concerto (c. 1780)
- Čestmír Gregor
  - Cello Concerto (1974)
- Edward Gregson
  - A Song for Chris Concerto for cello and chamber orchestra (2007)
- Olivier Greif
  - Cello Concerto Durch Adams Fall (1999)
- Lene Grenager
  - Cello Concerto (2006)
- Alexander Gretchaninov
  - Cello Concerto in A minor, Op. 8, 1895
- Johann Konrad Gretsch
  - Cello Concerto in C
- Edvard Grieg
  - Cello Sonata (1883) orchestrated into a concerto by Joseph Horovitz and Benjamin Wallfisch
- Johann Benjamin Gross
  - Cello Concerto in the form of a Concertino, Op. 14
  - Cello Concerto, Op. 31
  - Cello Concerto, Op. 38
- Robert Groslot
  - Cello Concerto (2011)
- Heinz Karl Gruber
  - Cello Concerto (1989)
- Jorge Grundman
  - Concerto for Cello and String Orchestra. Act of Contrition Op. 76 (2021)
- Friedrich Grützmacher
  - Cello Concerto No. 1 (1854)
  - Cello Concerto No. 2 (1858)
  - Cello Concerto No. 3 (1859)
- M. Camargo Guarnieri
  - Choro for Cello and Orchestra (1961)
- Sofia Gubaidulina
  - Detto-2 for cello and chamber ensemble (1972)
  - Seven Last Words, partita for cello, bayan, and string orchestra (1982)
  - Und: Das Fest ist in vollem Gang (1993)
  - The Canticles of the Sun for cello, mixed choir and percussions (1997)
- Friedrich Gulda
  - Concerto for Cello and Wind Orchestra (1980)
- Christopher Gunning
  - Cello Concerto (2013)
- Manfred Gurlitt
  - Cello Concerto (after 1933, before 1939)

=== H ===
- Georg Friedrich Haas
  - Konzert für Violoncello und Orchester (2003-2004)
- Daron Hagen
  - Concerto for Cello and Orchestra (1996)
  - Concerto for Cello and Wind Ensemble (1998)
- Reynaldo Hahn
  - Cello Concerto (incomplete, 1905)
- Cristóbal Halffter
  - Partita for Cello and Orchestra (1957) for Gaspar Cassadó
  - Concerto for Cello and Orchestra (1974) for Siegfried Palm
  - Concerto No. 2 for Cello and Orchestra (1985) for Mstislav Rostropovich
- Hafliði Hallgrímsson
  - Cello Concerto (2003)
- Asger Hamerik
  - Romance for Cello and Orchestra, Op. 27 (1879)
- Johan Hammerth
  - Cello Concerto (1998)
- John Harbison
  - Cello Concerto (1993)
- Ross Harris
  - Cello Concerto (2011)
- Julius Harrison
  - Cello Concerto
- Emil Hartmann
  - Cello Concerto in D minor, Op. 26 (1879)
- Jonathan Harvey
  - Cello Concerto (1990)
- Christos Hatzis
  - Confessional for Cello and Orchestra (2001)
- Johann Adolph Hasse
  - Cello Concerto in D
- Joseph Haydn
  - Cello Concerto No. 1 in C major, H. 7b/1 (c. 1765)
  - Cello Concerto No. 2 in D major, H. 7b/2 (Op. 101) (1783)
  - Cello Concerto No. 3 in C major, H. 7b/3 (c. 1780, lost)
  - Cello Concerto No. 4 in D major, H. 7b/4 (1750s, spurious, now thought to be the work of Giovanni Battista Costanzi – see Petrucci Music Library)
  - Cello Concerto No. 5 in C major, H. 7b/5 (1899, spurious, now thought to be the work of David Popper)
  - Cello Concerto in G minor, H. 7b/g1 (c. 1773, doubtful, lost)
- Michael Haydn
  - Cello Concerto in B♭
- Lennart Hedwall
  - Concerto for cello and strings (1970)
- Friedrich Hegar
  - Cello Concerto (published 1919)
- Robert Heger
  - Cello Concerto
- Paavo Heininen
  - Deux Chansons (1976)
  - Cello Concerto (1985)
- Gustav Helsted
  - Cello Concerto (1919)
- Hans Werner Henze
  - Ode and den Westwind (1953)
  - Englische Liebeslieder (1985)
  - Introduction, Thema und Variationen, for cello, harp and Strings
- Victor Herbert
  - Suite for Cello and Orchestra, Op. 3 (1882)
  - Cello Concerto No. 1 in D, Op. 8 (1882)
  - Fantasia on "The Desire" (Schubert) for Cello and Orchestra (1891)
  - Légende for Cello and Orchestra (1893)
  - Cello Concerto No. 2 in E minor, Op. 30 (1894) ()
- Paul Hermann
  - Cello Concerto (1925)
- Philippe Hersant
  - Cello Concerto No. 1 (1989)
  - Cello Concerto No. 2 (1996–1997)
- Johann Wilhelm Hertel
  - Cello Concerto in A (1755)
  - Cello Concerto in A minor (1759)
- Sean Hickey
  - Cello Concerto (2008)
- Paul Hindemith
  - Cello Concerto Op. 3 (1916)
  - Kammermusik #3
  - Cello Concerto in G (1940)
- Ryōhei Hirose
  - Cello Concerto Triste (1971)
- Emil Hlobil
  - Cello Concerto (1983)
- Vincent Ho
  - City Suite: concerto for amplified cello and orchestra (2011)
  - Three Warriors: concerto for cello trio and strings (2014)
- Alun Hoddinott
  - Cello Concerto (1948)
  - Nocturnes & Cadenzas for cello & orchestra op62 (1968)
  - Noctis Equi for cello & orchestra op132 (1989)
- Heinrich Hofmann
  - Cello Concerto (first published 1875)
- Leopold Hofmann
  - at least seven cello concertos, in C major (1770s; Badley C1), C major (1771; Badley C2), C major (1760s; Badley C3), C major (1768; Badley C4), D major (1760s or 1771, Badley D1), D major (1760s; Badley D2) and D major (1775, Badley D3) (NYPL and Naxos recording information. Different editions of D1 disagree, apparently. Published in modern times by Artaria, generally edited by Allan Badley.)
- Joseph Holbrooke
  - Cello Concerto (1936)
- Vagn Holmboe
  - Cello Concerto, Op. 120 (M. 273 in Paul Rapoport's catalog. 1974/79)
- Gustav Holst
  - Invocation for Cello and Orchestra, Op. 19, No. 2 (1905)
- Ignaz Holzbauer
  - Cello Concerto in A (published c. 1780)
- Arthur Honegger
  - Cello Concerto (1929)
- Toshio Hosokawa
  - Cello Concerto (1997)
  - Chant (2009)
  - Sublimation (2016)
- Stephen Hough
  - Cello Concerto – The Loneliest Wilderness (2007)
- Luc Van Hove
  - Concerto for cello and chamber ensemble (1998)
- Alan Hovhaness
  - Cello Concerto, Op. 17 (1936)
- Gagik Hovunts
  - Cello Concerto The Harmony of Sound (1976)
- Herbert Howells
  - Cello Concerto (1943–83) (unfinished – First movement entitled Fantasia, and second movement posthumously orchestrated and titled Threnody remain, and can be performed as separate works. A completion was produced in 2012 by Jonathan Clinch (Durham University) )
- Peter Hristoskov
  - Cello Concerto-Poem (1973)
- Dimiter Hristov
  - Cello Concerto (1970)
- Tyzen Hsiao
  - Cello Concerto (1990)
- Vitaliy Hubarenko
  - Cello Concerto-poem (1963)
  - Chamber Symphony No. 4 for cello and string orchestra (1983)
- Jean Hubeau
  - Cello Concerto (1942)
- Gregor Huebner
  - Cello Concerto (2008)
- Bertold Hummel
  - Poem for Cello and Strings, Op. 80 (1984)()
- Johann Nepomuk Hummel
  - Grand Potpourri
- Karel Husa
  - Cello Concerto (1988)
- Lajos Huszár
  - Chamber concerto for cello and 17 strings (1987)
- Ketil Hvoslef
  - Cello Concerto No. 1 (1976)
  - Cello Concerto No. 2 (1991)
- Eero Hämeenniemi
  - Cello Concerto (2011)

=== I ===
- Federico Ibarra Groth
  - Cello Concerto (1989)
- Jacques Ibert
  - Concerto for Cello and Winds (1926?)
- Airat Ichmouratov
  - Concerto for Cello No. 1 with String Orchestra and percussion Op. 18 (2009)
  - Capriccio Rustico for Cello and Orchestra Op. 26 (2010)
  - The Ride of Cello Vello Buffon for Cello with Orchestra Op. 27 (2010)
  - Concerto for Cello No. 2 with Symphony Orchestra and percussion Op. 57 (2018)
- Shin'ichirō Ikebe
  - Cello Concerto Almost a tree (1996)
- Călin Ioachimescu
  - Cello Concerto (2002)
- Martun Israelyan
  - Concerto for Cello and 16 Strings (1983)
- Georgi Ivanov
  - Cello Concerto (1977)
- Jānis Ivanovs
  - Concerto for Cello and Orchestra in B minor (1938)

=== J ===
- Giuseppe Maria Jacchini
  - 10 "Concerti per camera [...] con violoncello obligato" Op. 4
- Frederick Jacobi
  - Cello Concerto (Three Psalms) for Cello and Orchestra (1932)
- Marie Jaëll
  - Cello Concerto in F (1882)
- Jean-Baptiste Janson
  - Six Concertos pour le violoncelle à grand orchestre Op. 6 (1780)
  - Six Nouveaux Concertos à grand orchestre pour le violoncelle Op. 15 (1799)
- Justé Janulyté
  - Midnight Sun for cello and strings with night mutes (2017)
- Michael Jarrell
  - Emergences – Nachlese VI (2011)
  - Assonance V (chaque jour n'est qu'une trêve...) (1990)
- John Jeffreys
  - Cello Concerto (destroyed by the composer)
- Wilhelm Jeral
  - Cello Concerto (published 1906)
- Ivan Jevtić
  - Cello Concerto (1982)
  - Cello Symphony (1995)
- Erkki Jokinen
  - Cello Concerto (1970)
- Betsy Jolas
  - Wanderlied, for cello and ensemble (2003)
  - Side Roads, for cello and String Orchestra (2017)
- André Jolivet
  - Cello Concerto No. 1 (1962)
  - Cello Concerto No. 2 (1967) ()
- Daniel Jones
  - Cello Concerto (1986)
- Samuel Jones
  - Cello Concerto (2010)
- Joseph Jongen
  - Concerto for Cello, Op. 17 (1900)
- Sverre Jordan
  - Cello Concerto (1947)
- John Joubert
  - Cello Concerto Op. 171 (2011)
- René Jullien
  - Cello Concerto (1913)
- Paul Juon
  - Mysterien for Cello and Orchestra, Op. 59 (1928)
- Šimon Jurovský
  - Cello Concerto (1953)

=== K ===
- Dmitry Kabalevsky
  - Cello Concerto No. 1 in G minor, Op. 49 (1948–49)
  - Cello Concerto No. 2 in C minor, Op. 77 (1964)
- Jouni Kaipainen
  - Cello Concerto, Op. 65 (2003)
- Viktor Kalabis
  - Cello Concerto (1956)
- Imants Kalniņš
  - Cello Concerto (1963)
- Romualds Kalsons
  - Cello Concerto (1970)
- Dmitri Kaminsky
  - Cello Concerto (1957)
- Juho Kangas
  - Concerto for Cello and Strings (2010)
- Božidar Kantušer
  - Cello Concerto (1966)
- Artur Kapp
  - Cello Concerto (1946)
- Eugen Kapp
  - Cello Concerto (1986)
- Nikolai Kapustin
  - Cello Concerto No. 1 (1986)
  - Cello Concerto No. 2 (2002)
- Maurice Karkoff
  - Cello Concerto (1958)
- Yuri Kasparov
  - Cello Concerto (1998)
- Elena Kats-Chernin
  - Triptych for Silence (Nonchalance, No Silence, and Blue Silence)
  - Eliza Aria
- Fritz Kauffman
  - Cello Concerto (published 1899)
- Fredrick Kaufman
  - Cello Concerto (1984) Kaddish
- Minna Keal
  - Cello Concerto (1988–94)
- Aaron Jay Kernis
  - Cello Concerto Colored Field (2000)
  - Air for cello and orchestra (2000)
  - Dreamsongs (2013)
- Gordon Kerry
  - Concerto for cello, strings and percussion (1996)
- Rudolf Kelterborn
  - Cello Concerto (1999)
- Aram Khachaturian
  - Cello Concerto in E minor (1946)
  - Concerto-Rhapsody in D minor (1963)
- Karen Khachaturian
  - Cello Concerto (1983)
- Viktor Khodyashev
  - Cello Concerto (1963)
- Alexander Kholminov
  - Concerto for cello and chamber choir (1980)
  - Concerto for cello, brass quintet and timpani (1992)
  - Concerto for cello and chamber orchestra (1995)
- Tikhon Khrennikov
  - Cello Concerto No. 1 in C, Op. 16 (1964)
  - Cello Concerto No. 2, Op. 30 (1985)
- Oleg Khromushin
  - Cello Concerto (1980)
- Adam Khudoyan
  - Cello Concerto No. 1 (1959)
  - Cello Concerto No. 2 (1973)
  - Cello Concerto No. 3 (1990)
- John Kinsella
  - Cello Concerto (2000) ()
- Leon Kirchner
  - Music for Cello and Orchestra (1992)
- Uuno Klami
  - Cheremissian Fantasy Op. 19 (1931)
  - Tema con 7 variazioni e coda (1954)
- Dmitri Klebanov
  - Cello Concerto No. 1 (1950)
  - Cello Concerto No. 2 (1973)
- Giselher Klebe
  - Concerto for Cello and Orchestra, Op. 29 (1958)
- George Kleinsinger
  - Concerto for Cello and Orchestra (1965)
- Julius Klengel
  - Cello Concerto No. 1, Op. 4 (1880)
  - Cello Concerto No. 2, Op. 20 (1887)
  - Cello Concerto No. 3 in A minor, Op. 31 (1895)
  - Cello Concerto No. 4, Op. 37 (1903) ()
- Abelis Klenickis
  - Concerto-Poem for Cello and Orchestra (1962)
- August Klughardt
  - Cello Concerto in A minor, Op. 59 (1894)
- Vytautas Klova
  - Cello Concerto No. 1 (1963)
  - Cello Concerto No. 2 (1973)
- Douglas Knehans
  - Cello Concerto No. 1 Soar (2004)
  - Cello Concerto No. 2 Black City (2015)
- Lev Knipper
  - Concerto-Monologue for cello, seven brass instruments and timpani (1962)
  - Cello Concerto No. 1 (1962)
  - Saga for cello, chorus and orchestra (1963)
  - Concerto-Poem for cello and chamber orchestra (1971)
  - Cello Concerto No. 2 (1972)
- Erland von Koch
  - Cello Concerto (1951)
- Jesper Koch
  - Cello Concerto Dreamscapes (2007)
- Raoul Koczalski
  - Cello Concerto (1915)
- Joonas Kokkonen
  - Cello Concerto (1969) ()
- Benedykt Konowalski
  - Concerto for cello and string orchestra (1996)
- Marek Kopelent
  - Musique Concertante, for violoncello, 12 violoncelli and orchestra (1991)
- Anders Koppel
  - Cello Concerto (2006)
- Herman David Koppel
  - Cello Concerto, Op. 56 (1952)
- Grigoriy Korchmar
  - Cello Concerto (1976)
- Nikolai Korndorf
  - Concerto capriccioso for cello and percussion (1986)
- Erich Wolfgang Korngold
  - Cello Concerto, Op. 37 (from the movie Deception) (1946)
- Paavo Korpijaakko
  - Cello Concerto Ankarat Valovedet (2011)
- Olli Kortekangas
  - Cello Concerto with Horn Obligato (2000)
- Irena Kosíková
  - 7 Candles for cello and orchestra (2006) ()
  - MAKANNA for cello, voice and orchestra (2010) ()
- Olli Koskelin
  - Cello Concerto 1912/18
- Pekka Kostiainen
  - Cello Concerto (1979)
- Nina Kotova
  - Cello Concerto for cello and orchestra (2000)
  - Cello Concerto "The Tuscan" for cello and string orchestra (2005)
- Július Kowalski
  - Concerto for cello and string orchestra (1970)
- Hans Kox
  - Cello Concerto No. 1 (1969 rev.1981)
  - Cello Concerto No. 2 (1997) An Odyssey
- Antonín Kraft
  - Cello Concerto in C major, Op. 4
- Mirko Krajči
  - Cello Concerto (2001)
- Ernst Krenek
  - Cello Concerto No. 1, Op. 133 (1953)
  - Capriccio for cello and orchestra, Op. 145 (1955)
  - Cello Concerto No. 2, Op. 236 (1982)
- Johann Jacob Kriegk
  - Cello Concerto Op. 2
  - Cello Concerto Op. 3
  - Cello Concerto Op. 4
- Rudolf Kubín
  - Cello Concerto (1960)
- Gary Kulesha
  - Cello Concerto (2006)
- Meyer Kupferman
  - Concerto for cello and jazz band (1962)
- Jeren Kurbanklycheva
  - Cello Concerto (1979)

=== L ===
- Ilari Laakso
  - AM – Concerto for Cello and Orchestra (1992)
- Sophie Lacaze
  - Immobilité serieuse II for cello and strings (2020)
- Ezra Laderman
  - Concerto for cello and orchestra (1984)
  - Concerto for cello and orchestra (1986)
  - Variations on a Passacaglia for Cello solo and Large Orchestra (20 min) (1994)
- Helmut Lachenmann
  - Notturno" (1966/68) for solo cello and small orchestra
- Édouard Lalo
  - Cello Concerto in D minor (1876)
- Marcel Landowski
  - Cello Concerto (1945)
  - Poème Concertante for cello and orchestra Un Chant (1996)
- Daniël de Lange
  - Cello Concerto
- Domenico Lanzetti
  - Cello Concerto in D
  - Cello Concerto in E
  - Cello Concerto in F
  - Cello Concerto in G
- Lars-Erik Larsson
  - Cello Concerto (1947)
  - Concertino for Cello and String Orchestra (1956)
- Mats Larsson Gothe
  - Concerto for Cello and Winds (1999)
- Mario Lavista
  - Concerto
- Henri Lazarof
  - Cello Concerto No. 1 (1968)
  - Cello Concerto No. 2 (1992)
- Roman Ledenov
  - Concerto-elegy for cello and orchestra (1980)
- Claude Ledoux
  - Torrent – for cello and chamber orchestra (1995)
- René Leibowitz
  - Concerto for cello and orchestra Op. 58 (1962)
- Kenneth Leighton
  - Concerto for Cello and Orchestra, Op. 31
- Michel Legrand
  - Cello Concerto (2012)
- René Leibowitz
  - Cello Concerto (1962)
- Albert Leman
  - Cello Concerto (1967)
- Leonardo Leo
  - 6 Cello Concertos (D major (1737), F minor (undated), A major (1738), D minor (1738), A major (1737) and Sinfonia Concertata for violoncello and strings in C minor (1737))
- Fred Lerdahl
  - Arches (2011) – for solo cello and large chamber ensemble
- Yuri Levitin
  - Concertino for cello and orchestra (1961)
  - Suite for cello and orchestra (1966)
- Ernst Lévy
  - Cello Concerto (1947)
- Frank Ezra Levy
  - Cello Concerto No. 1 (1995)
  - Cello Concerto No. 2 (2003)
  - Cello Concerto No. 3 (2014)
- Ulrich Leyendecker
  - Cello Concerto (1983)
- Peter Lieberson
  - "The Six Realms" for cello and orchestra (2000)
- György Ligeti
  - Cello Concerto, for Siegfried Palm
- Magnus Lindberg
  - Cello Concerto No. 1 (1999) ()
  - Cello Concerto No. 2 (2013)
- Bo Linde
  - Concerto for cello and orchestra, Op. 29
- August Lindner
  - Cello Concerto in E minor (first published 1860)
- Larry Lipkis
  - Cello Concerto Scaramouche (1989)
- Vassily Lobanov
  - Cello Concerto (1985)
- Fernando Lopes-Graça
  - Concerto da Camera col Violoncello Obbligato (1966)
- Bent Lorentzen
  - Cello Concerto (1984)
- Raymond Loucheur
  - Cello Concerto (1968)
- Jean Louël
  - Cello Concerto (1986)
- Leighton Lucas
  - Cello Concerto (or Concertino 1956)
- Štěpán Lucký
  - Cello Concerto (1946)
- David Ludwig
  - Concerto for Cello and Orchestra (2004)
- Zdeněk Lukáš
  - Cello Concerto No. 1 (1957)
  - Cello Concerto No. 2 (1986)
  - Cello Concerto No. 3 Ricordi (2005)
- Witold Lutosławski
  - Cello Concerto (1969/70 or 1970) ()

=== M ===
- Lorin Maazel
  - Music for Violoncello and Orchestra (Op. 10)
- Aleksi Machavariani
  - Cello Concerto (1987)
- James MacMillan
  - Cello Concerto (premiered 1996)
- Elizabeth Maconchy
  - Epyllion for cello and string orchestra (1975)
- Jan Maegaard
  - Cello Concerto (1993)
- Miłosz Magin
  - Concerto for cello, string orchestra and timpani (1977)
- Giuseppe de Majo
  - Cello Concerto in F
- Arvydas Malcys
  - Cello Concerto (2009)
- Ivo Malec
  - Arc-en-Cello (2003)
- Gian Francesco Malipiero
  - Cello Concerto (1937)
- Riccardo Malipiero Junior
  - Cello Concerto No. 1 (1938)
  - Cello Concerto No. 2 (1957)
- Alexander Manevich
  - Cello Concerto No. 1 (1929)
  - Cello Concerto No. 2 (1945)
  - Cello Concerto No. 3 (1950)
- Philippe Manoury
  - Bref Aperçu sur l'Infini for Cello and Orchestra (2015)
- Tigran Mansurian
  - Concerto No. 1 for cello and large orchestra To the Memory of Dmitry Shostakovich (1976)
  - Concerto No. 2 for cello and strings (1978)
  - Concerto No. 3 for cello and small orchestra (1983)
  - Concerto No. 4 for cello and small orchestra Ubi est Abel frater tuus? (2010)
  - Quasi parlando for cello and string orchestra (2012)
- Bruno Mantovani
  - Concerto pour violoncelle et Orchestre (2003)
- Franco Margola
  - Violoncello Concerto, Op. 91 (1949)
- Henri Marteau
  - Cello Concerto in B♭ major (1905)
- Frank Martin
  - Ballade, for cello and orchestra
  - Cello Concerto (1965-6) ()
- Jean Martinon
  - Cello Concerto (1963)
- Rolf Martinsson
  - Cello Concerto (2005)
- Bohuslav Martinů
  - Cello Concerto 1 (1930, rev. 1939, rev. 1959)
  - Cello Concerto 2 (1944–45) ()
  - Concertino (1934)
  - Sonata or concerto da camera (1940) ()
- Tauno Marttinen
  - Cello Concerto Dalai Lama (1966)
- Martín Matalon
  - Trame III (2000)
- Josef Matěj
  - Cello Concerto (1972)
- Teizo Matsumura
  - Cello Concerto (1984)
- Ville Matvejeff
  - Cello Concerto Crossroads (2009)
- Colin Matthews
  - Cello Concerto 1 (1983–84)
  - Cello Concerto 2 (1996)
  - Berceuse for Dresden
- David Matthews
  - Romanza for cello and orchestra, Op. 49 (1990)
  - Concerto in Azzurro for cello and orchestra, Op. 87 (2001–02)
  - Berceuse (2007)
- Siegfried Matthus
  - Cello Concerto (1975)
- Nicholas Maw
  - Sonata Notturna for cello and string orchestra (1985)
- John McCabe
  - Cello Concerto Songline (2007)
- Tilo Medek
  - Cello Concerto (1978)
- Janis Medinš
  - Cello Concerto No. 1 (1928)
  - Cello Concerto No. 2 (1947)
- Johan de Meij
  - Casanova for solo cello and wind orchestra (2000)
- Alfred Mendelsohn
  - Cello Concerto No. 1 (1950)
  - Cello Concerto No. 2 (1962)
- Arnold Mendelssohn
  - Student Concerto in D major for Cello and Orchestra, Op. 213
- Peter Mennin
  - Concerto for Cello and Orchestra (1956) ()
- Gian Carlo Menotti
  - Fantasia for cello and orchestra (1976)
- Aarre Merikanto
  - Konzerstück (1926)
  - Cello Concerto 2 (1941–44)
- Usko Meriläinen
  - Cello Concerto (1974)
- John Metcalf
  - Cello Symphony (2004)
- Krzysztof Meyer
  - Cello Concerto No. 1 (1984) for cello and small orchestra (Concerto da camera No. 3) Canti Amadei
  - Cello Concerto No. 2 (1995)
- András Mihály
  - Cello Concerto (1953)
- Marko Mihevc
  - Cello Concerto (2009)
- Darius Milhaud
  - Cello Concerto 1 (1935)
  - Cello Concerto 2 (1945)
  - Suite cisalpine (1954)
- Cassandra Miller
  - Duet, for Cello and Orchestra (2015)
- Richard Mills
  - Cello Concerto (1990)
- Mark Minkov
  - Cello Concerto (1969)
- Ernest John Moeran
  - Cello Concerto in B minor (1945)
- Roberto Molinelli
  - Twin Legends for cello and strings (2005)
- Bernhard Molique
  - Cello Concerto in D (published 1854)
- Johann Melchior Molter
  - Cello concerto (c.1730s) Little Karlsruhe Margrave-Concerto
- Georg Matthias Monn
  - Cello Concerto in D major—arranged by Arnold Schoenberg from a harpsichord concerto (1746)
  - Cello Concerto, G minor
- Emánuel Moór
  - Cello Concerto (1906)
  - Double Cello Concerto (1908)
- Oskar Morawetz
  - Memorial to Dr. Martin Luther King, Jr. (1968) for solo cello, winds, brass, percussion and harp (no strings; Commissioned by Mstislav Rostropovich; premiered in 1975 by Zara Nelsova and the Montreal Symphony Orchestra, Otto-Werner Mueller, cond.)
- Norbert Moret
  - Cello Concerto (1985)
- David Morgan
  - Cello Concerto (1981)
- Stanisław Moryto
  - Cello Concerto (1992)
- Alexander Mosolov
  - Cello Concerto No. 1 (1935) (lost)
  - Cello Concerto No. 2 in C minor (1946)
- Piotr Moss
  - Cello Concerto No. 1 (1975)
  - Cello Concerto No. 2 Prieres (2003)
- Jon Mostad
  - Cello Concerto (1990)
- Wolfgang Amadeus Mozart
  - Sinfonia Concertante for Violin, Viola, Cello and Orchestra (fragment)
  - Cello Concerto (lost)
- Nico Muhly
  - Cello Concerto (2012)
- Nico Muhly, Sven Helbig and Zhou Long (multi-composer work)
  - Cello Concerto Three Continents (2019)
- Paul Müller-Zürich
  - Cello Concerto (1954)
- Kelly-Marie Murphy
  - This is the colour of my dreams for cello and orchestra (1997)
- Thea Musgrave
  - From Darkness into the Light (2017)
- Nikolai Myaskovsky
  - Cello Concerto in C minor, Op. 66 (1944) ()
- Paweł Mykietyn
  - Cello Concerto No. 1 (1998)
  - Cello Concerto No. 2 (2019)
- Josef Mysliveček
  - Cello Concertos in C, F, D

=== N ===
- Sulkhan Nasidze
  - Cello Concerto (1974)
- Marc Neikrug
  - Concerto for cello and Orchestra (2011)
- Franz Xaver Neruda
  - five cello concertos (No. 1 in E minor, Op. 57; No. 2 in D minor, Op. 59; No. 3 in A, Op. 60; No. 4 in A minor, Op. 61 (1887); No. 5 in G, Op. 66) ( and contain this information.)
- Jon Øivind Ness
  - Cello Concerto Wet Blubber Soup (2002)
- Dimitri Nicolau
  - Concerto for cello and chamber orchestra (1990)
- Chan Ka Nin
  - Soulmate, for cello and orchestra
- Akira Nishimura
  - Cello Concerto (1990)
- August Nölck
  - Cello Concerto in D minor Op. 108 (c. 1905)
  - Cello Concerto in A minor in Op. 130a (1912)
- Jón Nordal
  - Cello Concerto (1983)
- Frank Nordensten
  - Cello Concerto No. 1 (1996)
- Anders Nordentoft
  - Cello Concerto Light Imprisoned (1998)
- Pehr Henrik Nordgren
  - Cello Concerto No. 1, Op. 50 (1980)
  - Cello Concerto No. 2, Op. 62 (1984)
  - Hate-Love for cello and string orchestra, Op. 71 (1987)
  - Cello Concerto No. 3, Op. 82 (1992)
  - Cello Concerto No. 4, Op. 89 (1994)
- Arne Nordheim
  - Concerto for Cello and Chamber Orchestra Tenebrae (1982)
- Per Nørgård
  - Between – Cello Concerto 1 (1985)
  - Remembering a Child (1987)
  - Momentum – Cello Concerto 2 (2009)
- Ib Nørholm
  - Cello Concerto (1989)
- Mikhail Nosyrev
  - Cello Concerto (1973)
- Milan Novák
  - Cello Concerto (1978)
- Michael Nyman
  - A New Pavan for These Sad, Distracted Times (2009)
- Gösta Nystroem
  - Sinfonia Concertante (1945)

=== O ===
- Aleksandar Obradović
  - Cello Concerto (1979)
- Andrej Očenáš
  - Cello Concerto No. 1 (1952)
  - Cello Concerto No. 2 (1977)
- Jacques Offenbach
  - Grande Concerto in G major (Concerto Militaire) (1847)
- Maurice Ohana
  - L'anneau de Tamarit for cello and orchestra (1976)
  - Cello Concerto "In Dark and Blue" (1989–1990)
- Hisato Ohzawa
  - Urashima for cello and orchestra
- Buxton Orr
  - A Carmen Fantasy (1990) for cello and orchestra
- Léon Orthel
  - Cello Concerto No. 1 Aan mijn Ouders (1929)
  - Cello Concerto No. 2 (1984)
- Nigel Osborne
  - Cello Concerto (1977)

=== P ===
- Luis de Pablo
  - Cello Concerto Frondoso Misterio (2002)
- Tadeusz Paciorkiewicz
  - Concerto for cello and chamber ensemble (1991)
- Vaclovas Paketūras
  - Cello Concerto (1966)
- Josef Páleníček
  - Cello Concerto (1973)
- Andrzej Panufnik
  - Cello Concerto (1991, premiered 1992)
- Arvo Pärt
  - Cello Concerto
- Claude Pascal
  - Cello Concerto (1959)
- Paul Patterson
  - Cello Concerto (2002)
- Gustaf Paulson
  - Cello Concerto No. 1 (1944)
  - Cello Concerto No. 2 (1957)
- Stephen Paxton
  - Cello Concerto in G (c. 1787)
- Russell Peck
  - Voice of the Wood, concerto for cello quartet and orchestra
- Michail Pekov
  - Cello Concerto No. 1 (1975)
  - Cello Concerto No. 2 (1982)
- Josef Pembaur Senior
  - Cello Concerto (1910)
- Krzysztof Penderecki
  - Sonata for cello and orchestra (1964) for Siegfried Palm
  - Cello Concerto No. 1 (1972)
  - Cello Concerto No. 2 (1982)
  - Concerto Grosso No. 1 for 3 cellos and orchestra (2000)
  - Largo for cello and orchestra (2003)
- Moses Pergament
  - Cello Concerto (1955)
- Piotr Perkowski
  - Cello Concerto (1973-4)
- George Perle
  - Cello Concerto (1966)
- Jean Perrin
  - Cello Concerto (1972)
- William Perry
  - Jamestown Concerto for Cello and Orchestra (2007)
- Laurent Petitgirard
  - Cello Concerto (1994) ()
- Carmen Petra Basacopol
  - Cello Concerto (1982)
- Petros Petridis
  - Cello Concerto (1936)
- Hans Pfitzner
  - Cello Concerto No. 1 in G major, Op. 42 (1935)
  - Cello Concerto No. 2 in A minor, Op. 52 (1943)
  - Cello Concerto in A minor, Op. posth.(1888)
- Carlo Alfredo Piatti
  - Concertino, Op. 18 (1863?)
  - Cello Concerto No. 1 in B♭ major, Op. 24 (1874)
  - Cello Concerto No. 2 in D minor, Op. 26 (1877)
- Tobias Picker
  - Cello Concerto (1999)
- Willem Pijper
  - Cello Concerto (1936 rev.1947)
- Edward Joshua Pimentel Ojeda
  - Cello Concerto No. 1 (2019)
  - Cello Concerto No. 2 (2019)
- Matthias Pintscher
  - La Metamorfosi di Narciso for cello and ensemble (1992)
  - Reflections on Narcissus for cello and orchestra (2005)
  - Un despertar (2016)
- Lubomir Pipkov
  - Symphony-Concerto for cello and orchestra (1963)
- Walter Piston
  - Variations for Cello and Orchestra (1966)
- Ildebrando Pizzetti
  - Cello Concerto (1934)
- Nicolas-Joseph Platel
  - Five Cello Concertos
- Giovanni Benedetto Platti
  - Cello Concerto in A
  - Cello Concerto in D minor
  - Cello Concerto in D
- Ignaz Pleyel
  - Four Cello Concertos in C major and one in D major
- Erich Plüss
  - Cello Concerto (2015)
- Petr Podkovyrov
  - Cello Concerto (1959)
- Valeri Polyakov
  - Cello Concerto (1960)
- David Popper
  - Cello Concerto No. 1 in D minor, Op. 8, 1861
  - Cello Concerto No. 2 in E minor, Op. 24, 1880
  - Cello Concerto No. 3 in G major, Op. 59, in one movement
  - Cello Concerto No. 4 in B minor, Op. 72, in four movements
  - Cello Concerto No. 5 "in the style of Haydn" ()
- Nicola Porpora
  - Cello Concerto in G major
- Angelique Poteat
  - Cello Concerto (2019)
- Gerhard Präsent
  - Danse fatale Op. 75 (2017–18), 10 min.
- Gabriel Prokofiev
  - Cello Concerto (2012)
- Sergei Prokofiev
  - Cello Concerto, Op. 58
  - Symphony-Concerto in E minor, Op. 125 (1950–52)
  - Cello Concertino in G minor, Op. 132 (one version completed by Kabalevsky, another by Blok) (1952)
- Dariusz Przybylski
  - Cello Concerto (2013)
- Uljas Pulkkis
  - Madrigal (2000)
  - Dragonfly (2012)

=== R ===
- Robin de Raaff
  - Cello Concerto (2013)
- Jaan Rääts
  - Concerto for cello and chamber orchestra Op. 27 (1966)
  - Concerto for cello and orchestra Op. 43 (1971)
  - Concerto for cello and orchestra Op. 59 (recomposition of Op. 43, 1977)
  - Concerto for cello and chamber orchestra Op. 99 (1997)
- Joachim Raff
  - Cello Concerto No. 1 in D minor, Op. 193, 1874
  - Cello Concerto No. 2 in G, Op. posth., 1876
- Osmo Tapio Räihälä
  - Cello Concerto
- Priaulx Rainier
  - Cello Concerto (1964)
- Primož Ramovš
  - Cello Concerto (1974)
- Bernard Rands
  - Cello Concerto (1996)
- Behzad Ranjbaran
  - Cello Concerto
- Weronika Ratusińska-Zamuszko
  - Cello Concerto (2008)
- Georg Wilhelm Rauchenecker
  - Cello Concerto (1904)
- Einojuhani Rautavaara
  - Cello Concerto No. 1 (1968)
  - Cello Concerto No. 2 Towards the Horizon (2009)
- Alan Rawsthorne
  - Cello Concerto
- Igor Raykhelson
  - Cello Concerto (2010)
- Josef Reicha
  - Cello Concertos in F minor, G major and A major (and/or E major) from Op. 4
- Antonín Reichenauer
  - Cello Concerto in D
  - Cello Concerto in D minor
- Carl Reinecke
  - Cello Concerto in D minor, Op. 82 (1864)
- Karel Reiner
  - Cello Concerto (1943)
- Jay Reise
  - Concerto for cello and 13 instruments (2000)
- Franz Reizenstein
  - Cello Concerto, Op. 8 (1951)
- Antanas Rekašius
  - Cello Concerto Diaphony (1972)
- Stefan Remenkov
  - Cello Concerto (1964)
- Ottorino Respighi
  - Adagio con variazioni for Cello and Orchestra
- Roger Reynolds
  - The Dream of the Infinite Rooms (1986)
- Paul Richter
  - Cello Concerto Op. 109
- Jaroslav Rídký
  - Cello Concerto No. 1 (1930)
  - Cello Concerto No. 2 (1940)
- Alan Ridout
  - Cello Concerto No. 1 for cello, percussion and strings (1984)
  - Cello Concerto No. 2 for cello and wordless choir (1994)
  - Cello Concerto No. 3 for cello and 8 cellos (1995)
- Vittorio Rieti
  - Cello Concerto 1
  - Cello Concerto 2 (1953)
- Julius Rietz
  - Cello Concerto (1830s)
- Wolfgang Rihm
  - Monodram for Cello and Orchestra (1982–1983)
  - Styx und Lethe for Cello and Orchestra (1997–1998)
  - Konzert in einem Satz for Cello and Orchestra (2005–2006)
- Jean Rivier
  - Cello Concerto (1927)
- Hayden Roberts
  - Cello Concerto (2019)
- Yann Robin
  - Quarks (2016)
- Joaquín Rodrigo
  - Concerto in modo galante (1949)
  - Concerto como un divertimento (1981)
- Bernhard Romberg
  - Concerto No. 1 in B♭ major, for cello and orchestra Op. 2
  - Grand Concerto No. 2 in D major, for cello with orchestra Op. 3
  - Concerto No. 3 in G major, for cello and orchestra Op. 6
  - Cello Concerto No. 4 in E minor Op. 7
  - Concerto No. 5 in F♯ minor for cello and orchestra Op. 30
  - Concerto No. 6 in F major (Militaire) for cello and orchestra Op. 31
  - Concerto No. 7 in C major (Suisse) for cello and orchestra Op. 44
  - Concerto No. 8 in A major (Brillant) for cello and orchestra Op. 48
  - Concerto No. 9 in B minor (Grand) for cello and orchestra Op. 56
  - Concerto No. 10 in E major (Brillant), for cello and orchestra Op. 75
- Alfonso Romero Asenjo
  - Cello Concerto (1995)
- Julius Röntgen
  - Cello Concerto No. 1 in E minor (1893/1894)
  - Cello Concerto No. 2 in G minor (1909)
  - Cello Concerto No. 3 in F♯ minor (1928)
- Guy Ropartz
  - Rhapsodie pour violoncelle et orchestre (1928)
- Ned Rorem
  - Cello Concerto (2002) ()
- Hilding Rosenberg
  - Cello Concerto No. 1 (1939)
  - Cello Concerto No. 2 (1953)
- Helmut Rosenvald
  - Concerto for cello and chamber orchestra (1970)
  - Chamber symphony No. 2 (for cello and chamber orchestra, 1979)
- Nino Rota
  - Cello Concerto No. 0 (1925) Premiered by Orfeo Mandozzi (2005)
  - Cello Concerto No. 1 (1972)
  - Cello Concerto No. 2 (1973)
- Doina Rotaru
  - Cello Concerto (1987)
- Christopher Rouse
  - Violoncello Concerto (1993)
- Albert Roussel
  - Cello Concertino (1936)
- Francis Routh
  - Cello Concerto (1973)
- Miklós Rózsa
  - Cello concerto, Op. 32 (1968)
- Edmund Rubbra
  - Soliloquy for cello, horns strings and timpani, Op. 57 (1947)
- Anton Rubinstein
  - Cello Concerto in A minor, Op. 65 (1864)
  - Cello Concerto in D minor, Op. 96 (1875)
- Poul Ruders
  - Polydrama – Cello Concerto 1 (1988)
  - Anima – Cello Concerto 2 (1993)

=== S ===
- Kaija Saariaho
  - Amers, for cello and ensemble (1992)
  - Cello Concerto Notes on Light (2006)
- Nicola Sabatino
  - Cello Concerto in G
- Harald Sæverud
  - Cello Concerto (1931)
- Dimitar Sagaev
  - Cello Concerto No. 1 (1977)
  - Cello Concerto No. 2 (1998)
- Camille Saint-Saëns
  - Cello Concerto No. 1 in A minor, Op. 33 (1872)
  - Cello Concerto No. 2 in D minor, Op. 119 (1902)
  - Allegro appassionato in B minor, Op. 43
  - Romance, Op. 36
  - Romance, Op. 67
  - Suite in D minor, Op. 16 bis for cello and orchestra
- Aulis Sallinen
  - Cello Concerto, Op. 44 (1976)
  - Nocturnal Dances of Don Juan Quixote for Cello and String Orchestra, Op. 58
- Erkki Salmenhaara
  - Poema for cello and orchestra (1975)
  - Cello Concerto (1987)
- Siegfried Salomon
  - Cello Concerto (1922)
- Esa-Pekka Salonen
  - "Mania" for cello and ensemble (or orchestra) (2000)
  - Cello Concerto (2017)
- Tadeáš Salva
  - Concerto for cello and chamber orchestra (1967)
- Sven-David Sandström
  - Cello Concerto (1988)
- Cláudio Santoro
  - Cello Concerto (1961)
- Federico Maria Sardelli
  - Cello Concerto in G minor (2008)
  - Cello Concerto in C minor (2018)
- Ruben Sargsyan
  - Concerto No. 1 for Cello and Symphonic orchestra, 1977
  - Concerto No. 2 for Cello and Chamber orchestra, 1979
  - Concerto No. 3 for Cello and Chamber orchestra, 1989
  - Concerto No. 4 for Cello and Chamber orchestra, 1994
  - Cogitation for Cello and Chamber orchestra, 2000
- Philip Sawyers
  - Cello Concerto (2010)
- Robert Saxton
  - Cello Concerto (1993)
- Fazıl Say
  - Cello Concerto Never give up (2018)
- Ahmet Adnan Saygun
  - Cello Concerto, Op. 74 (1987)
- Giacinto Scelsi
  - Cello Concerto
- Harold Schiffman
  - Cello Concerto (1997)
- Heather Schmidt
  - Cello Concerto (1998)
- Ole Schmidt
  - Cello Concerto (2005)
- Thomas Schmidt-Kowalski
  - Cello Concerto (2002)
- Florent Schmitt
  - Introït, Récit et Congé for cello and orchestra (1948)
- Albert Schnelzer
  - Crazy Diamond – Cello concerto (2011)
- Alfred Schnittke
  - Cello Concerto No. 1 (1986)
  - Cello Concerto No. 2 (1989–90)
- Daniel Schnyder
  - Concerto for Violoncello and Orchestra
- Othmar Schoeck
  - Cello concerto in A minor, Op. 61 (1947)
- Philippe Schoeller
  - The Eyes of the Wind (2005)
- Arnold Schoenberg
  - Cello Concerto in D major (1932/33), freely transcribed from Monn's Clavicembalo Concerto in D major
- Peter Schuback
  - Cello Concerto (1973)
- Carl Schuberth
  - Cello Concerto No. 1 (published 1841)
- William Schuman
  - A Song of Orpheus for Cello and Orchestra (1962)
- Robert Schumann
  - Cello Concerto in A minor, Op. 129 (1850)
- Gerard Schurmann
  - The Gardens of Exile for cello and orchestra (1991)
- Ary Schuyer
  - Cello concerto (1913)
- Laura Schwendinger
  - Esprimere Concerto for cello and orchestra (2005)
- Salvatore Sciarrino
  - Linee d'aria (2022)
  - Variazioni (1974)
- Cyril Scott
  - Cello Concerto [No. 1], Op. 19 (1902)
  - Cello Concerto [No. 2] (1937)
- Leif Segerstam
  - 8 Cello Concertos
- Mátyás Seiber
  - Tre Pezzi for cello and orchestra (1956)
- Anatolijus Šenderovas
  - Concerto for Cello and String Orchestra (1964)
  - Cello Concerto in C (2002)
  - Cello Concerto No. 3 (2012)
- Adrien-François Servais (1807-1866)
  - Cello Concerto in B minor Op. 5 (1847)
  - Morceau de concert Op. 14 (Deuxieme concerto)
  - Concerto Militaire Op. 18
- Zdeněk Šesták
  - Cello Concerto No. 1 Light of Hope (2002)
  - Cello Concerto No. 2 The Path of Knowledge (2005)
- Tolib Shakhidi
  - Cello Concerto No. 1 Concert Raga (1989)
  - Cello Concerto No. 2 (2003)
- Vache Sharafyan
  - Cello Concerto No. 1 (2004)
  - Suite for cello and orchestra (2009)
  - Cello Concerto No. 2 (2013)
- Rodion Shchedrin
  - Cello Concerto opus 87 "Sotto Voce" (1994)
  - Parabola Concertante for cello, string orchestra and timpani (2001)
- Alexander Shchetynsky
  - Cello Concerto (1982)
- Noam Sheriff
  - Cello Concerto (1987)
- Percy Sherwood
  - Cello Concerto No. 1 (1890 rev.1893)
  - Cello Concerto No. 2 (1902)
- Aida Shirazi
  - Meditations on Departure (2024)
- Howard Shore
  - Mythic Gardens (2012)
- Dmitri Shostakovich
  - Cello Concerto No. 1 in E♭, Op. 107 (1959)
  - Cello Concerto No. 2 in G, Op. 126 (1966)
- Alan Shulman
  - Cello Concerto (1948)
  - Kol Nidre for cello and orchestra or string quartet (1970)
- Þorkell Sigurbjörnsson
  - Cello Concerto Ulisse Ritorna (1981)
- Valentyn Silvestrov
  - Meditation Symphony for cello and chamber orchestra (1972)
- Pavol Šimai
  - Cello Concerto (1986)
- Daniel Léo Simpson
  - Cello Concerto (1996)
- Robert Simpson
  - Cello Concerto (1991)
- Hans Sitt
  - Concerto No. 1 in A minor for cello and orchestra, Op. 34 (1890)
  - Concerto No. 2 in D minor for cello and orchestra, Op. 38 (1891)
- Nikos Skalkottas
  - Cello Concerto – lost (1938)
- Lucijan Marija Škerjanc
  - Allegro de Concert (1947)
- Yngve Sköld
  - Cello Concerto (1947)
- Myroslav Skoryk
  - Cello Concerto (1983)
- Sergei Slonimsky
  - Concerto for cello and chamber orchestra (1998)
- Roger Smalley
  - Concerto for cello and 17 players (1996)
- Dmitri Smirnov
  - Cello Concerto (1992)
- Tatiana Smirnova
  - Concerto-Symphony for cello and chamber orchestra (1987)
- Leo Smit
  - Concertino (1937)
- Dmitry Smolsky
  - Cello Concerto (1973)
- Črt Sojar Voglar
  - Cello Concerto (2002)
- Giovanni Sollima
  - Cello Concerto (1992)
- Vladimir Soltan
  - Cello Concerto (1987)
- Vladimír Sommer
  - Cello Concerto (1979)
- József Soproni
  - Cello Concerto No. 1 (1967)
  - Cello Concerto No. 2 (1984)
- Vladimír Soukup
  - Cello Concerto (1972)
- Leo Sowerby
  - Cello Concerto in A major (1914–16)
  - Cello Concerto in E minor (1929–1934)
- Ivan Spassov
  - Cello Concerto No. 1 (1974)
  - Cello Concerto No. 2 (1984)
- Marek Stachowski
  - Concerto for cello and string orchestra (1988)
  - Recitativo e la preghiera (1999)
  - Adagio ricordamente (1999)
- Julius Stahlknecht
  - Cello Concerto (published 1867)
- Carl Stamitz
  - Cello Concerto No. 1 in G major
  - Cello Concerto No. 2 in A major
  - Cello Concerto No. 3 in C major
  - Cello Concerto No. 4 in C (from c. 1777)
- Patric Standford
  - Cello Concerto (1974)
- Charles Villiers Stanford
  - Cello Concerto in D minor (1879/1880)
  - Irish Rhapsody No. 3 (1913)
- Robert Starer
  - Cello Concerto (1988)
- Johannes Maria Staud
  - Segue (2006)
- Leon Stein
  - Cello Concerto (1970)
- Allan Stephenson
  - Cello Concerto (2004)
- Roger Steptoe
  - Cello Concerto (1991)
- Bernard Stevens
  - Cello Concerto (1952)
- Ronald Stevenson
  - Cello Concerto (1998) The Solitary Singer
- Veselin Stoyanov
  - Cello Concerto (1960)
- Todor Stoykov
  - Cello Concerto (1982)
- Gerald Strang
  - Concerto for cello with woodwinds and piano (1951)
- Johann Strauss II
  - Romance No. 1 Op. 243
  - Romance No. 2 Op. 255
- Richard Strauss
  - Romanze
  - Don Quixote
- Franz Strigl
  - Cello Concerto (1890s)
- Marco Stroppa
  - And one by one we drop away (2006)
- Steven Stucky
  - Voyages for Cello and Wind Ensemble (1984)
- Stjepan Šulek
  - Cello Concerto (1949)
- Arthur Sullivan
  - Cello Concerto in D (reconstruction) (1866)
- Lepo Sumera
  - Cello Concerto (1998/1999)
- Johan Svendsen
  - Cello Concerto in D major, Op. 7 (1870)
- Jules de Swert
  - Cello Concerto No. 1 (1874)
  - Cello Concerto No. 2 (1878)
- Harald Sæverud
  - Cello Concerto, Op. 7 (1931) ()
- Pawel Szymanski
  - Simple Music

=== T ===
- Emil Tabakov
  - Cello Concerto (2006)
- Tan Dun
  - Elegy: Snow in June, for cello and percussion (1991)
  - Yi1: Intercourse of Fire and Water, (1994)
  - Heaven Earth Mankind: Symphony 1997 (1997)
  - Crouching Tiger Concerto, for cello and chamber orchestra (2000)
  - The Map: Concerto for Cello, Video and Orchestra (2002)
- Tōru Takemitsu
  - Scene, for cello and strings
  - Orion and Pleiades, for cello and Orchestra
- Otar Taktakishvili
  - Cello Concerto No. 1 (1947)
  - Cello Concerto No. 2 (1977)
- Josef Tal
  - Concerto for violoncello & string orchestra (1960)
  - Double Concerto for violin, cello & chamber orchestra (1969)
- Eino Tamberg
  - Cello Concerto (2001)
- Karen Tanaka
  - Urban Prayer (2004)
- Eric Tanguy
  - Concerto 1 (1995)
  - Concerto 2 (2000)
  - In terra pace (2007)
- Alexandre Tansman
  - Cello Concerto (1964)
- Andrea Tarrodi
  - Cello Concerto Highlands (2013)
- Giuseppe Tartini
  - Cello Concerto in D
  - Cello Concerto in A
- John Tavener
  - The Protecting Veil for cello and String Orchestra (1988)
- Alexander Tchaikovsky
  - Cello concerto 6 Variations and a Theme (1974)
- Boris Tchaikovsky
  - Cello Concerto in E (1964)
- Pyotr Ilyich Tchaikovsky
  - Variations on a Rococo Theme, Op. 33, 1876, rev. 1878
  - Pezzo capriccioso, Op. 62
  - Norturne, Op. 19, No. 4
  - Cello Concerto in B minor (1893, unfinished)], completed by Yuriy Leonovich in 2006
- Ede Terényi
  - Concerto for cello and chamber orchestra Rapsodia Baroca (1984)
- Yuri Ter-Osipov
  - Cello Concerto No. 1 (1969)
  - Cello Concerto No. 2 (1982)
- Alexander Tcherepnin
  - Georgian Rhapsody for Cello and orchestra, Op. 25 (1922)
  - Mystère for Cello and Chamber Orchestra, Op. 37/2 (1925)
- Ferdinand Thieriot
  - Cello Concerto No. 1 (published 1915)
- Augusta Read Thomas
  - Cello Concerto No. 1 – Vigil (1990)
  - Cello Concerto No. 2 – Ritual Incantations (1999)
  - Cello Concerto No. 3 – Legend of the Phoenix (2012)
- Olav Anton Thommessen
  - Miniature concerto for cello and two woodwind quintets Phantom of Light (1990)
- Virgil Thomson
  - Cello Concerto (1949)
- Lasse Thoresen
  - Passage through three Valleys Op. 38 (2008)
- Anna S. Þorvaldsdóttir
  - Before we fall (2024)
- Leif Thybo
  - Cello Concerto (1959)
- Vladimír Tichý
  - Cello Concerto (1977)
- Jukka Tiensuu
  - "Oire" Cello Concerto (2014)
  - Tarinaoopperabaletti, Concerto for Electric cello and orchestra (2016)
- Luís Tinoco
  - Cello Concerto (2016-7)
- Boris Tishchenko
  - Cello Concerto No. 1, for solo cello, 17 wind instruments, percussion, and harmonium (1963) (Also orchestrated by Dmitri Shostakovich in 1969)
  - Cello Concerto No. 2, for solo cello, 48 cellos, 12 double-basses, and percussion (1969, arranged for orchestra in 1979)
- Antoine Tisné
  - Cello Concerto (1965)
- Juro Tkalčić
  - Cello Concerto (1922)
- Ernst Toch
  - Cello Concerto, Op. 35 (1924) ()
- Henri Tomasi
  - Cello Concerto (1970)
- Eugenio Toussaint
  - Cello Concerto No. 1 (1982)
  - Cello Concerto No. 2 (1999)
- Donald Tovey
  - Cello Concerto in C major, Op. 40 (1933)
- Joan Tower
  - Music for Cello and Orchestra (1984)
  - A New Day (2021)
- Yuzo Toyama
  - Cello Concerto (1967)
- Jean Balthasar Tricklir
  - 13 cello concertos
- Vitomir Trifunović
  - Cello Concerto (1991)
- Arnold Trowell
  - Cello Concerto No. 4 in G minor, Op. 59 (1930)
- Sulkhan Tsintsadze
  - Cello Concerto No. 2 (1966)
  - Cello Concerto No. 3 (1973)
  - Concertino for cello and orchestra (1976) (30 min)
- Vladimir Tsytovich
  - Cello Concerto (1981)
- Helena Tulve
  - In Uncharted Waters (Tundmatuis vetes) (2018)
- Mark-Anthony Turnage
  - Kai, for cello and ensemble (1990)
  - Cello Concerto (2010)
- Kalervo Tuukkanen
  - Cello Concerto (1946)
- Erkki-Sven Tüür
  - Cello Concerto (1996)
- Romuald Twardowski
  - Cello Concerto (1997)

=== U ===
- Owen Underhill
  - Cello Concerto (2016)

=== V ===
- Moisei Vainberg see Mieczysław Weinberg
- Johann Baptist Vanhal see Johann Baptist Wanhal
- Sergei Vasilenko
  - Cello Concerto (1944)
- Pēteris Vasks
  - Cello Concerto (1993–1994)
  - Cello Concerto No. 2 Klātbūtne (Presence) for cello and string orchestra (2012)
- Marc Vaubourgoin
  - Cello Concerto (1932)
- Anatol Vieru
  - Cello concerto (1962)
  - Sinfonia Concertante (1987)
- Henri Vieuxtemps
  - Cello Concerto in A minor, Op. posth. 46 (1877)
  - Cello Concerto in B minor, Op. posth. 50 (1884)
- Heitor Villa-Lobos (1887–1959)
  - Grande Concerto for Cello and Orchestra No. 1, Op. 50 (1915)
  - Fantasia for Cello and Orchestra, W. 454 (1945)
  - Cello Concerto No. 2, W. 516 (1953)
- Jesús Villa-Rojo
  - Concierto 2 for cello and orchestra (1983)
- Carl Vine
  - Cello Concerto (2004)
- János Viski
  - Cello Concerto (1955)
- Antonio Vivaldi
  - RV 398 in C
  - RV 399 in C
  - RV 400 in C
  - RV 401 in C minor
  - RV 402 in C minor
  - RV 403 in D
  - RV 404 in D
  - RV 405 in D minor
  - RV 406 in D minor (related to RV 481)
  - RV 407 in D minor
  - RV 408 in E♭
  - RV 410 in F
  - RV 411 in F
  - RV 412 in F
  - RV 413 in G
  - RV 414 in G
  - RV 415 in G
  - RV 416 in G minor
  - RV 417 in G minor
  - RV 418 in A minor
  - RV 419 in A minor
  - RV 420 in A minor
  - RV 421 in A minor
  - RV 422 in A minor
  - RV 423 in B♭
  - RV 424 in B minor
  - RV 531 in G minor, for 2 cellos
- Vladimir Vlasov
  - Cello Concerto No. 1 in C major (1963)
  - Cello Concerto No. 2 (1969)
- Lodewijk de Vocht
  - Cello Concerto (1955)
- Kevin Volans
  - Cello Concerto (1997)
- Robert Volkmann
  - Cello Concerto in A minor, Op. 33 (1853–55) (in one movement)
- Alexander Voormolen
  - Cello Concerto (1941)
- Antonín Vranický (or Anton Wranitzky)
  - Concerto in D minor

=== W ===
- Georg Christoph Wagenseil
  - concertos in C major and A major (published by Doblinger c. 1960 by Fritz Racek and/or with cadenzas by Enrico Mainardi)
- George Walker
  - Concerto for Cello and Orchestra (1981)
  - Dialogus for Cello and Orchestra (1976)
  - Movements for Cello and Orchestra (2012)
- Errollyn Wallen
  - Concerto for cello and strings (2007)
- Rolf Wallin
  - Ground, for cello and string orchestra (1996)
- Ivor Walsworth
  - Cello Concerto
- William Walton
  - Cello Concerto (1956)
- Johann Baptist Wanhal (Vanhal)
  - Cello Concerto in A major
  - Cello Concerto in C
  - Cello Concerto in C
- Graham Waterhouse
  - Cello Concerto, Op. 27 (1995), also Op. 27a (2005), a version for chamber orchestra
- Carl Maria von Weber
  - Concerto (Grand Potpourri)
- Karl Weigl
  - Cello Concerto (1934)
- Mieczysław Weinberg
  - Cello Concerto in C minor, Op. 43 (1956)
  - Fantasy for Cello and Orchestra (1956)
- Felix Weingartner
  - Cello Concerto in A minor, Op. 60 (1917)
- Henning Wellejus
  - Cello Concerto (1978)
- Deqing Wen
  - Cello Concerto Shanghai Prelude (2015)
- Svend Westergaard
  - Cello Concerto (1962)
- Graham Whettam
  - Concerto Drammatico (1998)
- Charles-Marie Widor
  - Cello Concerto, Op. 41 (1882)
- John Williams
  - Concerto for Cello and Orchestra (1994)
  - Elegy for Cello and Orchestra (1997)
  - Heartwood for Cello and Orchestra (2002)
- Dag Wirén
  - Cello Concerto (1936)
- Friedrich Witt
  - Cello Concerto
- Ermanno Wolf-Ferrari
  - Cello Concerto in C, Op. 31
- Julia Wolfe
  - Wind in my Hair (2018)
- Haydn Wood
  - Philharmonic Variations for cello and orchestra (1939)
- Hugh Wood
  - Cello Concerto Op. 12 (1969)
- John Woolrich
  - Cello Concerto (1998)
- William Wordsworth
  - Cello Concerto (1962)
- Paul Wranitzky
  - Concerto in C major, Op. 27
- Charles Wuorinen
  - Chamber concerto for cello and ten instruments (1963)
  - Concerto for amplified cello and orchestra Five (1975)

=== X ===
- Iannis Xenakis
  - Epicycles, for cello and 12 instruments

=== Y ===
- Victoria Yagling
  - Cello Concerto No. 1 (1975)
  - Cello Concerto No. 2 (1984)
  - Cello Concerto No. 3 – Symphony Concerto (2001)
- Dmitri Yanov-Yanovsky
  - Cello Concerto (2010)
- Akio Yashiro
  - Cello Concerto (1960)
- Takashi Yoshimatsu
  - Cello Concerto (Centaurus Unit)(2003)
- Yosko Yosifov
  - Cello Concerto (1950)
- Eugène Ysaÿe
  - Méditation
  - Serenade
- Isang Yun
  - Concerto for Cello and Orchestra (1975/76)
- Benjamin Yusupov
  - Cello Concerto (2007)

=== Z ===
- Jan Zach
  - Cello Concerto
- Andrea Zani
  - Cello Concerto No. 1 in A major, WD 793
  - Cello Concerto No. 2 in A minor, WD 789
  - Cello Concerto No. 3 in D major, WD 792
  - Cello Concerto No. 4 in D minor, WD 795
  - Cello Concerto No. 5 in G major, WD 790
  - Cello Concerto No. 6 in G minor, WD 797
  - Cello Concerto No. 7 in C major, WD 788
  - Cello Concerto No. 8 in C minor, WD 798
  - Cello Concerto No. 9 in B♭ major, WD 796
  - Cello Concerto No. 10 in F major, WD 794
  - Cello Concerto No. 11 in E minor, WD 791
  - Cello Concerto No. 12 in F minor, WD 799
- Pascal Zavaro
  - Cello Concerto No. 1 (2007)
  - Into the wild (Cello Concerto No. 2, 2016)
- Erich Zeisl
  - Concerto grosso for cello and orchestra (1956)
- Lubomír Železný
  - Cello Concerto (1968)
- Ilya Zeljenka
  - Cello Concerto (2000)
  - Concerto for two cellos and string orchestra (1994)
- Ferdinand Zellbell the Younger
  - Cello Concerto (1741)
- Hans Zender
  - Bardo (2000)
- Winfried Zillig
  - Concerto for Violoncello und Brass Orchestra (1934/1952), for Siegfried Palm
- Efrem Zimbalist
  - Cello Concerto (1969)
- Bernd Alois Zimmermann
  - Canto di Speranza (1957) for Siegfried Palm
  - Concerto for Cello and Orchestra en forme de pas de trois (1966), for Siegfried Palm
- Alexander Znosko-Borovsky
  - Cello Concerto (1968)
- Wim Zwaag
  - Cello concerto (2003) The changing colors in time
- Ellen Taaffe Zwilich
  - Concerto for Cello and Orchestra (2020)
- Otto Zykan
  - Cello Concerto (1982)
- Samuel Zyman
  - Cello Concerto (1990)

== Concertos for cello and other solo instrument(s) ==
- Kurt Atterberg
  - Concerto in G minor and C major for violin, violoncello and string orchestra, Op. 57 (1959–60)
- Ludwig van Beethoven
  - Triple Concerto for violin, cello, piano and orchestra in C major, Op. 56 (1804)
- Giovanni Bottesini
  - Double Concerto for Cello and Double Bass in G major
- Johannes Brahms
  - Double Concerto in A minor for Violin, Cello and Orchestra (1887)
- Cesar Bresgen
  - Concertino, for violin, cello and small orchestra
- Friedrich Cerha
  - Double Concerto, for Violin, Cello and Orchestra (1976)
- Gordon Shi-Wen Chin
  - Double concerto for Violin and Cello (2006)
- Paul Constantinescu
  - Triple concerto for piano, violin, cello and orchestra – 1964
- Richard Danielpour
  - In the Arms of the Beloved (Double Concerto for Violin, Cello and Orchestra) (2001)
- Johann Nepomuk David
  - Concerto for Violin, Cello and Orchestra, Op. 68 (1971)
- Frederick Delius
  - Double Concerto for Violin, Cello and Orchestra (1915–16)
- Edison Denisov
  - Concerto for bassoon, cello and orchestra (1982)
- Gaetano Donizetti
  - Double Concerto for Violin, Cello and Orchestra in D minor
- Tan Dun
  - Secret Land for Orchestra and Twelve Violoncellos (2004)
- Wolfgang Fortner
  - Zyklus for Violoncello, Winds, Harp and Percussion (1970), premiered by Siegfried Palm
- Géza Frid
  - Concertino for Violin, Cello, Piano and Orchestra, Op. 63 (11 min) (1961) Donemus
- Lou Harrison
  - Double Concerto for Violin, Cello and Gamelan (1982)
- Joseph Haydn
  - Sinfonia Concertante for violin, cello, oboe and bassoon
- Joel Hoffman (born 1953)
  - Triple Concerto for violin, viola, cello and orchestra (22 min) (1978)
  - Double Concerto for Viola and Cello and Orchestra (31 min)
- Leopold Hofmann
  - Concertino for two cellos and orchestra
- Julius Klengel
  - Double Concerto No. 1 for 2 Cellos and Orchestra
  - Double Concerto No. 2 in E minor for 2 Cellos and Orchestra, Op. 45 (1912)
  - Double Concerto No. 1 for Violin, Cello and Orchestra
  - Double Concerto No. 2 for Violin, Cello and Orchestra, Op. 61 (1924)
- Ezra Laderman
  - Parisot – Concerto for Multiple Cellos and orchestra (Schirmer) (27 min) (1996)
- Kenneth Leighton
  - Suite 'Veris Gratia' for Cello, Oboe and Orchestra, Op. 9
- Edgar Meyer
  - Double Concerto for Cello, Double Bass and Orchestra (1995) 19'
- Norbert Moret
  - Double Concerto for Violin and Cello (1981)
- Michael Nyman
  - Double concerto for Cello and Saxophone
- Mark O'Connor
  - Double Concerto for violin, cello and orchestra (For the Heroes) – three movements
- David Ott
  - Concerto for Two Cellos (1988)
- Krzysztof Penderecki
  - Concerto grosso for 3 Cellos and Orchestra (2000–01)
- Hans Pfitzner
  - Duo for Violin, Cello and Small Orchestra (or piano)
- Carlo Alfredo Piatti
  - "Serenata" for two cellos and orchestra
- David Popper
  - Requiem for 3 cellos and orchestra, Op. 66
- Robert Xavier Rodriguez
  - Favola Concertante, Ballet and Double Concerto for Violin, Cello, and String Orchestra (1975)
- Julius Röntgen
  - Triple concerto in B♭ major, for violin, viola, cello and strings (1922)
  - Double Concerto for violin and cello (1927)
  - Triple concerto for violin, viola and cello (1930)
  - Introduktion, Fuge, Intermezzo und Finale for violin, viola, cello
- Ned Rorem
  - Double Concerto for Violin, Cello and Orchestra
- Miklós Rózsa
  - Theme and Variations for violin, cello and orchestra (This work exist in two forms)
    - Sinfonia Concertant, Op. 29
    - Tema con Variazoni, Op. 29a
- Kaija Saariaho
  - Mirage for soprano, cello and orchestra (2007)
- Camille Saint-Saëns
  - La Muse et le Poète for Violin, Cello and Orchestra, Op. 132 (1910)
- Alfred Schnittke
  - Concerto Grosso No. 2, for violin, violoncello and orchestra (1981–82)
- Giovanni Sollima
  - Violoncelles, vibrez! (1993)
- Ivan Tcherepnin
  - Double Concerto for Violin, Cello and Orchestra (1996)
- Lasse Thoresen
  - Illuminations – Concerto for 2 Violoncelli and Orchestra
- Michael Tippett
  - Triple Concerto for violin, viola, cello and orchestra (1978–79)
- Jesús Torres
  - Transfiguración. Double Concerto for Cello, Accordion and String Orchestra
- Heitor Villa-Lobos
  - Fantasia Concertante for 16 or 32 cellos (1958)
- Antonio Vivaldi
  - Double Concerto in E minor for Cello and Bassoon, RV 409
  - Double Concerto in G minor for 2 Cellos and String Orchestra
  - Double Concerto ("All'inglese"), for Violin, Cello, Strings & Continuo in A major, RV 546
  - Concerto for Violin, Cello and Strings in B♭ major, Op. 20, No. 2
  - Concerto for Violin, Cello and Strings in F major RV 308
  - Concerto for Violin, Cello and Strings in A major RV 238
- Henri Vieuxtemps
  - Duo brilliant, for Violin, Cello and Orchestra, Op. 39
- Peter von Winter
  - Concertino in E♭ major for clarinet, cello and orchestra

== Arrangements ==
- Sir Granville Bantock
  - Elegiac poem (1898)
  - Sapphic poem (1906)
  - Celtic poem (1914)
  - Hamabdil for cello, harp and strings (1919) (Part of Judith)
  - Dramatic poem (1941)
- Adolphe Biarent
  - Deux sonnets pour violoncelle et orchestre – d'après José-Maria de Hérédia (1909–1912)
    - I Le réveil d'un dieu
    - II Floridum Mare
- Ernest Bloch
  - Schelomo, Rhapsodie Hebraïque pour violoncelle et grand orchestre (1915–16)
  - Voice in the Wilderness (1934–36)
- Léon Boëllmann
  - Variations Symphoniques, Op. 23
- York Bowen
  - Rhapsody for Cello and Orchestra, Op. 74 (c. 1924)
- Johannes Brahms
  - Arrangement of the Double Concerto for Solo Cello and Orchestra
    - (arr. Garben; from the Concerto for Violin and Cello and Orchestra) Edition Sikorski
- Frank Bridge
  - Oration (1930)
- Max Bruch
  - Kol Nidre, Op. 47 (late 1880)
  - Canzone, Op. 55 (about 1891)
  - Adagio after Celtic themes, Op. 56 (c. 1891)
  - Ave Maria, Op. 61 (1892)
- Alan Bush
  - Concert Suite, Op. 37
- Gaspar Cassadó
  - Cello Concerto in E major, based on Tchaikovsky's Piano Pieces, Op. 72, (1940)
  - Cello Concerto in D major, based on Carl Maria von Weber's Clarinet Concerto No. 2 in E♭ major, Op. 74
  - Cello Concerto in D major, based on Mozart's Horn Concerto No. 3 in E♭ major, K. 447
  - Cello Concerto in A minor, based on Schubert's Sonata for Arpeggione and Piano, D. 821
- Jean Cras
  - Légende (1929)
- César Cui
  - Deux morceaux Op. 36 (1886)
    1. Scherzando: Allegretto mosso
    2. Cantabile: Andante
- Frederick Delius
  - Caprice and Elegy (1930)
- Antonín Dvořák
  - Rondo in G minor, Op. 94, B. 181 (1893)
  - Silent Woods, Op. 68, No. 5, B. 182 (1893)
- Gabriel Fauré
  - Élegie in C minor, Op. 24
- Alexander Glazunov
  - A la mémoire d'un Heros, Op. 8 (1885)
  - Deux pièces, Op. 20 (1888)
    1. Mélodie: Moderato
    2. Sérénade espagnole: Allegretto
  - Chant du ménestrel, Op. 71 (1900)
  - A la mémoire de Gogol, Op. 87 (1909
- Osvaldo Golijov
  - Azul for cello and orchestra (2006)
  - Mariel for cello and orchestra (2007)
  - Ausencia for cello and strings (2007)
- Victor Herbert
  - 5 pieces (1900)
    1. Yesterthoughts
    2. Pièce amoureuse
    3. Puchinello
    4. Ghazel
    5. The Mountainbrook
- Frigyes Hidas
  - Fantasy for Cello and Wind Band (1998)
- Paul Juon
  - Mysterien für Violoncello und Orchester, Op. 59, 1928 ()
- Julius Klengel
  - Andante sostenuto, Op. 51
- Guillaume Lekeu
  - Larghetto for Cello and Orchestra (1892)
- Giuseppe Martucci
  - Andante. Op. 69.2 (1891)
- Oskar Morawetz
  - Memorial to Dr. Martin Luther King, Jr. (1968) for solo cello, winds, brass, percussion and harp (no strings; Commissioned by Mstislav Rostropovich; premiered in 1975 by Zara Nelsova and the Montreal Symphony Orchestra, Otto-Werner Mueller, cond.)
- Wolfgang Amadeus Mozart
  - Concerto in D for Cello and Orchestra K. 314 (285d) transcribed by George Szell (originally for oboe / flute in C major)
  - Cello Concerto in D, K. 447 (original for Horn in E♭) (arr. Cassadó)
- Jacques Offenbach
  - Andante, A.8 (1845)
  - Rondo, Op. 25
- Niccolò Paganini
  - Variations on One String
- Hans Pfitzner
  - Duo for Violin, Cello and small Orchestra, Op. 43 (1937)
- Carlo Alfredo Piatti
  - "Air Baskyrs, Op. 8" for cello and string orchestra
  - "Entreaty / Supplication / Bitte" for cello and orchestra
    - (also a version for cello and strings, also a version for cello and quartet)
  - "Tema e Variazioni" for cello and string orchestra
- Walter Piston
  - Variations for cello and orchestra (1966)
- David Popper
  - Im Walde Suite
  - Gavotte No. 2 in D minor
  - Tarantella
  - Hungarian Rhapsody
- Ottorino Respighi
  - Adagio con variazioni for Cello and Orchestra
- Nikolai Rimsky-Korsakov
  - Sérénade, Op. 37 (1893,1903)
- Julius Röntgen
  - Two Irish folk melodies (1912)
    - Shule Aroon
    - Bean Mhic A'Mhaoir
- Joseph-Guy Ropartz
  - Rhapsodie pour violoncelle et orchestre (1928)
- Edmund Rubbra
  - Soliloquy for cello, horns strings and timpani, Op. 57 (1947)
- Dorian Rudnytsky
  - Costa Blanca Suite (2005)
- Camille Saint-Saëns
  - Allegro appassionato in B minor, Op. 43
  - Romance, Op. 36
  - Suite in D minor, Op. 16 bis for cello and orchestra
- Aulis Sallinen
  - Nocturnal Dances of Don Juan Quixote for Cello and String Orchestra, Op. 58
- William Schuman
  - Song of Orpheus (1961)
- Charles Villiers Stanford
  - Rondo for Cello and Orchestra in F major (1869)
  - Irish Rhapsody No. 3 for Cello and Orchestra, Op. 137 (1913)
  - Ballata and Ballabile for Cello and Orchestra, Op. 160 (1918)
- Richard Strauss
  - Romance for cello and (piano or) orchestra, AV75 (1883)
- Igor Stravinsky
  - Italienische Suite, (transcribed for cello and chamber orchestra by Vassily Lobanov) (1985)
- Alexandre Tansman
  - Fantaisie (1937)
  - Les Dix commandements (1979)
- Pyotr Ilyich Tchaikovsky
  - Andente Cantabile, Op. 11 (from String Quartet No. 1)
- Andrew Lloyd Webber
  - Variations for cello and band or orchestra
- Julian Lloyd Webber
  - Jackie's Song, for cello and strings
- Carl Maria von Weber
  - Potpourri, Op. 20 (1808)
- Mieczysław Weinberg
  - Fantasy for Cello and Orchestra (1956)
- Graham Whettam
  - Ballade Hebraique (1999)

== See also ==
- Concerto
- List of solo cello pieces
- Cello concerto
- List of compositions for cello and piano
- List of compositions for cello and organ
- List of double concertos for violin and cello
- List of triple concertos for violin, cello, and piano
- List of compositions for violin and orchestra
- String instrument repertoire
