= Korchmar =

Korchmar is a Russian and Ukrainian surname. The Belarusian equivalent is Karchmar. Notable people with the surname include:

- Danny Kortchmar (born 1946), American musician
- Grigoriy Korchmar (1947–2025), Russian composer and pianist, brother of Leonid
- Leonid Korchmar (born 1943), Russian conductor
