= Soukup =

Soukup (feminine Soukupová) is a Czech occupational surname, denoting a person involved in trade. Notable people include:

- Aneta Soukup (born 1978), Canadian tennis player
- Hana Soukupová, Czech model
- Irena Soukupová, Czech rower
- Jan Soukup, Czech karateka and kickboxer
- Janay DeLoach Soukup, American athlete
- Jaroslav Soukup, Czech biathlete
- Jaroslav Soukup (director), Czech film director and producer
- Martha Soukup, American writer
- Matthew Soukup, Canadian ski jumper
- Miroslav Soukup, Czech football manager
- Ondřej Soukup, Czech composer
- Petra Soukupová, Czech author
- Věra Soukupová, Czech opera singer
- Vladimír Soukup, Czech classical composer
