= Cello Concerto (Ligeti) =

Cello concerto written in 1966

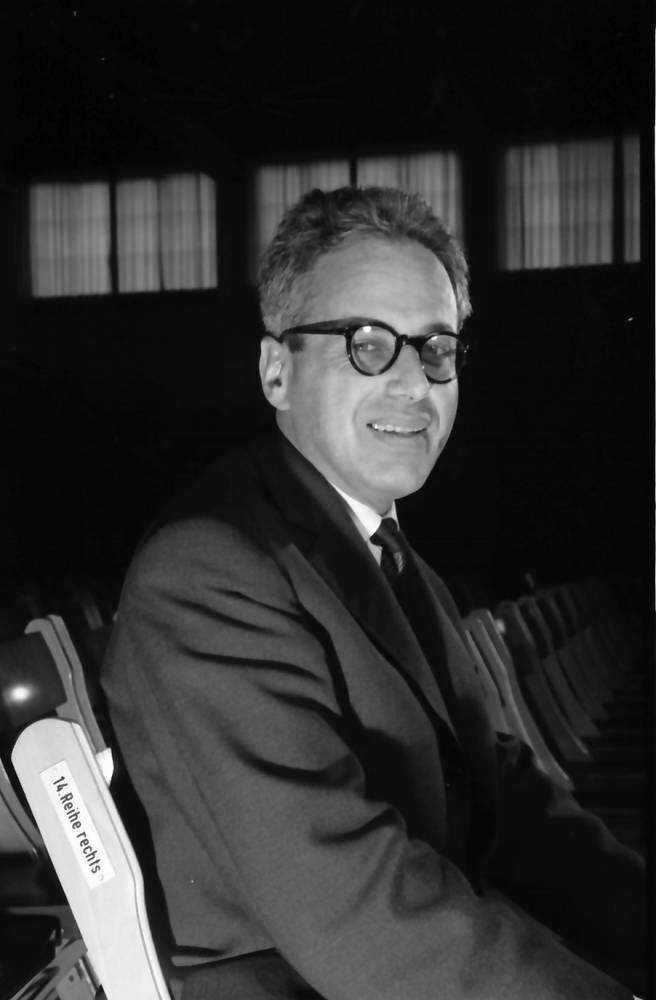
György Ligeti in 1961

The Concerto for Cello and Orchestra is a cello concerto by György Ligeti written in 1966. It is dedicated to cellist Siegfried Palm, who gave the concerto its premiere performance.

== History ==
Originally, Ligeti had planned to compose a single movement work. As progress on composition developed he decided to expand the initial material of the concerto into a movement in its own right and placed the remainder of the material into a second movement. In performance, however, the second movement follows immediately from the first, without a break.

The concerto was given its first performance in Berlin on 19 April 1967 with Siegfried Palm (cello) and the Berlin Radio Symphony Orchestra conducted by Henryk Czyż.

== Structure and style ==
The concerto is written for solo cello with a small orchestra of flute (doubling piccolo), oboe (doubling cor anglais), 2 clarinets (second doubling bass clarinet), bassoon, horn, trumpet, trombone, harp and strings.

The movements are as follows:

1. ♩ = 40 – attacca:
2. (Lo stesso tempo) ♩ = 40

A performance typically lasts approximately 16 minutes.

The work has been described as an "anti-concerto" due to the nature of the relationship between the soloist and the orchestra. The solo cello begins extremely quietly (the initial entry has the dynamic marking pppppppp (8 ps)) and continues in a role which is almost disassociated from the orchestra and avoids the usual virtuosic writing associated with a concerto soloist, in favour of creating mood and atmosphere.

== In popular culture ==
Along with other pieces by Ligeti, the cello concerto has been popular with film makers and has featured in

- A Warning to the Curious (dir. Lawrence Gordon Clark, 1972)
- Heat (dir. Michael Mann, 1995)
- Over Your Cities Grass Will Grow (dir. Sophie Fiennes, 2010)
- The Killing of a Sacred Deer (dir. Yorgos Lanthimos, 2017)

== Selected discography ==
- Christian Poltéra, cello; Baldur Brönnimann, conductor; BIT20 Ensemble (BIS Records)
- Jean-Guihen Queyras, cello; Pierre Boulez, conductor; Ensemble InterContemporain (Deutsche Grammophon)
- Nicolas Altstaedt, cello; Fabián Panisello, conductor; Plural Ensemble (Neos)
- Siegfried Palm, cello; Reinbert de Leeuw, conductor; Asko-Schönberg Ensemble (Teldec)
