= Siegfried Palm =

German cellist

- Siegfried Palm, in the 1980s
- Born: 25 April 1927; Barmen, Germany
- Died: 6 June 2005 (aged 78); Frechen, Germany
- Occupations: Cellist; Director of an opera house; Director of a University of music
- Years active: 1945–2005
- Organizations: Hochschule für Musik Köln; Deutsche Oper Berlin
- Known for: compositions dedicated to him
- Awards: Deutscher Schallplattenpreis; Grand Prix du Disque; Great Cross of Merit; Ordre des Arts et des Lettres; Ordre national du Mérite

Siegfried Palm (25 April 1927 – 6 June 2005) was a German cellist who is known worldwide for his interpretations of contemporary music. Many 20th-century composers like Kagel, Ligeti, Xenakis, Penderecki and Zimmermann wrote music for him. He was also Rektor of the Hochschule für Musik Köln and Intendant of the Deutsche Oper Berlin.

== Biography ==
Siegfried Palm was born in Barmen (now Wuppertal). At the age of 8 he started to learn playing the cello from his father; later he studied with Enrico Mainardi in master classes in Salzburg and Lucerne.

He played as principal cellist in various orchestras, among others in Lübeck since 1945, in the NDR Symphony Orchestra, Hamburg under Hans Schmidt-Isserstedt since 1947, and the WDR Symphony Orchestra Cologne 1962–1968.

Siegfried Palm premiered cello concertos as well as contemporary chamber music. He was a member of the Hamann-Quartett 1951–1962. He played in a duo with the pianist Aloys Kontarsky 1962–1983, and since 1967 he was a member of the piano trio Rostal/Schröter/Palm, replacing Gaspar Cassadó. In 1962 he became teacher of a master class for violoncello at the Hochschule für Musik Köln (then called Staatliche Hochschule für Musik), and from 1972 until 1976 head of this institute.

He started teaching at the Internationale Ferienkurse für Neue Musik in Darmstadt in 1962. From 1976 until 1981 he was Intendant of the Deutsche Oper Berlin. He was president of the International Society for Contemporary Music (ISCM) 1982–1988, and president of the Deutsch-Französischer Kulturrat 1988–2000. He conducted master classes and workshops around the world, as at the Carl-Flesch-Akademie in Baden-Baden, the Banff Centre for the Arts, Canada, at the Royal Conservatory in Stockholm 1966, Dartmouth College 1969, Marlboro College several times between 1970 and 1990, the Sibelius Academy in Helsinki 1971, and in Los Angeles 1983. He also served in the juries of international competitions. Palm appeared as the music teacher Wendell Kretzschmar in the 1982 German film Doktor Faustus.

Siegfried Palm influenced the music of his century considerably, comparable to the cellists Gregor Piatigorsky and Mstislav Rostropovich. He suggested composers to write new works for his instrument, and it is partly due to him that the cello advanced to one of the most important solo instruments in contemporary music.

Siegfried Palm played a cello built 1708 by Gianbattista Grancino that Julius Klengel had played before. He died in Frechen.

== Music for Siegfried Palm ==
Siegfried Palm premiered new music, many composers wrote new works for him, some dedicated to him, music for cello and orchestra as well as chamber music and music for cello solo. Music has included:

- Dieter Acker: Marginalien
- Sven-Erik Bäck: Ricercare p S.P. for cello
- Boris Blacher: Cello Concerto
- Hans Ulrich Engelmann: mini-music to siegfried palm
- Morton Feldman: Cello and Orchestra
- Johannes Fritsch: SUL B
- Wolfgang Fortner: Zyklus, New-Delhi-Musik
- Cristóbal Halffter: Cello Concerto
- York Höller: Pas de Deux
- Mauricio Kagel: Match for two cellists and one percussionist, Siegfriedp‘
- Milko Kelemen: Changeant for cello and orchestra
- Rolf Liebermann: Essai 81
- György Ligeti: Cello Concerto
- Tilo Medek: concerto, Schattenspiele
- Krzysztof Penderecki: Sonata for cello and orchestra, Capriccio per Siegfried Palm
- Robert H.P. Platz: SCHREYAHN
- Aribert Reimann: Wolkenloses Christfest
- Wolfgang Rihm: Monodram, Fremde Szene
- Giuseppe Sinopoli: Tombeau d’Armor III
- Dimitri Terzakis: Dialog der Seele mit ihrem Schatten, Duo
- Graham Waterhouse: Three Pieces for Solo Cello
- Iannis Xenakis: Nomos Alpha
- Isang Yun: Nore, Glissées
- Winfried Zillig: Cello Concerto
- Bernd Alois Zimmermann: Cello Concerto dedicated, Canto di Speranza, sonata for cello solo, Short Studies (4) for Cello solo premiered

== Discography ==
Numerous recordings of Siegfried Palm appeared with various labels, among others Deutsche Grammophon, EMI, Philips Classics Records and Teldec. Many of them are still available.

- Große Interpreten Neuer Musik: Siegfried Palm, Wergo.
- Intercomunicazione, Deutsche Grammophon

== Other positions ==
- President of the ESTA (European String Teachers Association)
- President of Internationales Jugendfestspieltreffen Bayreuth
- Member of the lecturer team of the Marlboro Music School and Festival

== Awards ==
- Deutscher Schallplattenpreis, 1969 and 1976
- Grand Prix du Disque International, 1972 and 1975
- Chevalier du Violoncelle Indiana University 1998
- Great Cross of Merit of the Federal Republic of Germany
- Verdienstorden des Landes Nordrhein-Westfalen (Order of Merit of North Rhine-Westphalia)
- Officer of the Ordre des Arts et des Lettres
- Chevalier of the Ordre national du Mérite

== Sources ==
- Michael Schmidt: Capriccio für Siegfried Palm. Ein Gesprächsporträt. ConBrio, Regensburg 2005, ISBN 3-932581-71-7 (in German)
- Studien zum Spielen neuer Musik, Edition Breitkopf 8334, Wiesbaden 1985, OCLC 13797038
- Entries to Siegfried Palm in WorldCat
