= Cello Concerto No. 3 (Thomas) =

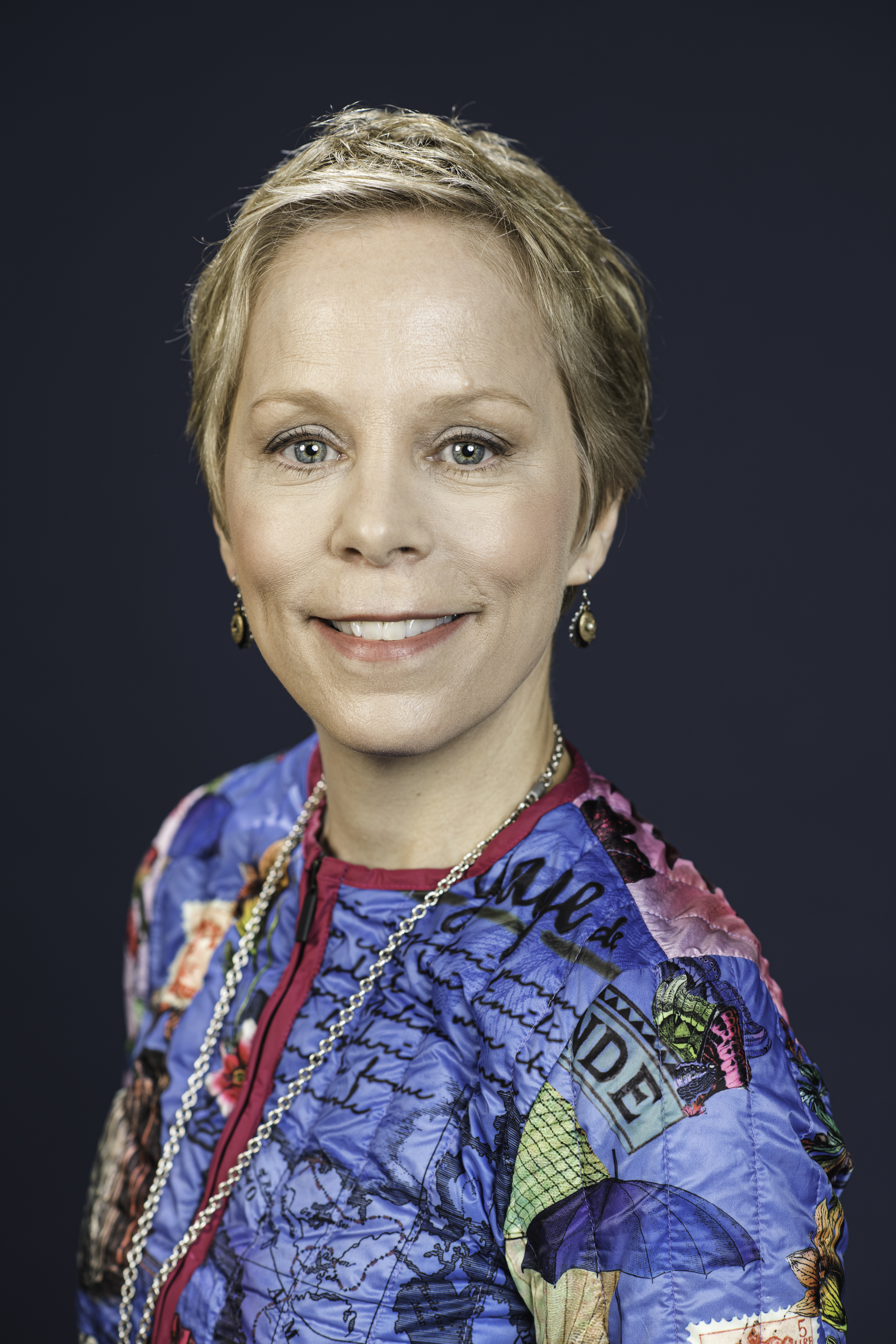
Augusta Read Thomas in 2020

The Cello Concerto No. 3, Legend of the Phoenix, is a composition for cello solo and orchestra by the American composer Augusta Read Thomas. The work was commissioned by the Boston Symphony Orchestra with contributions from Bill and Solange Brown. It was first performed in Boston on March 14, 2013, by the cellist Lynn Harrell and the Boston Symphony Orchestra under the conductor Christoph Eschenbach. Thomas subsequently adapted the piece into a viola concerto in 2013.

== Composition ==
The concerto has a duration of roughly 26 minutes and is composed in a single continuous movement. Thomas described the deliberately ambiguous title of the piece in an interview with The Boston Globe, remarking:

Life is short, and when I come to my drafting tables, I want to express a positive spirit outward. I feel like my music is colorful and whimsical and full of sunshine and light flickering and percussion and bells and high tessituras and this kind of illuminated sound. So images of skies and lights and orbits and aurora — they feel really right to me, even though I don't have to tell the audience that this is that particular legend or this particular phoenix. It's much more like a metaphor for an optimism in life.

=== Instrumentation ===
The work is scored for solo cello and a large orchestra comprising piccolo, two flutes, oboe, cor anglais, two clarinets (doubling bass clarinet), bassoon, contrabassoon, two horns, three trumpets (doubling piccolo trumpet), trombone, bass trombone, four percussionists, harp, piano, and strings.

== Reception ==
Reviewing the world premiere, Jeremy Eichler of The Boston Globe highly praised the concerto, writing:

Despite its subtitle "Legend of the Phoenix," the work has no explicit narrative but unfolds in a single 30-minute span that divides into coherent sections. The first is full of expansively songful cello writing, with the brass on occasion interjecting fractured, flash-mob fanfares, appearing from nowhere and disappearing nearly as fast. The solo writing eventually gathers speed and angularity and the rhythms grow more jazzy before the cello takes us into a hazier, dreamier landscape. There is a vibrant pizzicato section and some ruggedly expressive solo cadenzas in the final pages. The work comes full circle, ending as it began with a high blast from the cello.

He added, "The crowd's reception went well beyond the polite applause sometimes given to new scores." David Wright of The Classical Review also lauded Thomas's "skillful scoring" and particularly complimented the orchestral writing, noting, "At times it seemed one was listening to a Concerto for Orchestra and Cello instead of the other way around." He continued:

The concerto was a continuous piece lasting about 30 minutes, with four identifiable sections that brought some variety of tempo and mood—but not much. The music kept its shimmering colors and optimistic outlook throughout, and yet offered so much to keep the ear engaged that, when Harrell, playing alone at the end, finally put the period on this long sentence, one was surprised that a half-hour had passed.
