= Music for Cello and Orchestra =

- by Leon Kirchner
- Commissioned by: Philadelphia Orchestra
- Performed: 16 October 1992:
- Published: 1992: Associated Music Publishers
- Duration: 18 minutes
- Movements: one

Music for Cello and Orchestra is a composition for cello and orchestra by the American composer Leon Kirchner. The work was commissioned by the Philadelphia Orchestra for the cellist Yo-Yo Ma. The work was first performed by Yo-Yo Ma and the Philadelphia Orchestra under the conductor David Zinman in Philadelphia on October 16, 1992. The piece was a finalist for the 1993 Pulitzer Prize for Music.

== Composition ==
The commission was made possible by a donation from the philanthropists Lillian and Maurice Barbash to commemorate their 40th wedding anniversary. The music is cast in a single movement and has a duration of roughly 18 minutes.

=== Instrumentation ===
The work is scored for an orchestra comprising three flutes (doubling piccolo), three oboes, cor anglais, two clarinets, bass clarinet, four horns, three trumpets, three trombones, tuba, timpani, three percussionists, piano (doubling celesta), and strings.

== Reception ==
Reviewing a 1997 recording of the work, Gramophone wrote, "Leon Kirchner (b.1919), Ma's sometime teacher at Harvard, is a survivor from an older school, placing greater stress on internal logic and intellectual consistency even if he has moved away from the world of Arnold Schoenberg (his own teacher) to forge a personal style of 'euphonious dissonance'. There is here a rich, loving, almost Korngoldian lyricism, at first suppressed, at length permitted to flower."
