= Thérèse Brenet =

French composer (1935–2026)

Thérèse Brenet (22 October 1935 – 5 September 2026) was a French composer and educator.

== Life and career ==
Born in Paris on 22 October 1935, she studied piano at the Conservatoire de Reims and from 1954 at the Conservatoire de Paris. Among her teachers were Maurice Duruflé, Henri Dutilleux, Darius Milhaud, and Jean Rivier. In 1965 she won the Prix de Rome for her Les Visions prophétiques de Cassandre; a prize which enabled her to pursue further studies at the French Academy in Rome. She went on to win the Halphen Prize for fugue and composition and the Coplay Foundation of Chicago's composition prize. Brenet became a professor at the Conservatoire in 1970. She was also an honorary member of the National Academy of History in Reims. She retired from the Conservatory in 2000 to focus on composition.

Brenet composed around 80 works. Her compositional style encompassed both tonal and atonal techniques, including quarter-tones and aleatory sequences, and she frequently explored extended instrumental sounds (such as woodwind multiphonics), and non-standard instruments (notably the celtic harp). Her pieces often involved inspiration from nature, astronomy and religion, and literary references from authors such as Aeschylus, Comte de Lautréamont, and Pierre-Jean Jouve. The oratorio Clamavit for narrator, chorus and orchestra using Biblical texts was an early success. Commissioned by French Radio it was chosen to represent France at the UNESCO International Rostrum of Composers, and was subsequently widely performed abroad. Sidérales (1970), for orchestra and narrator (with a text adapted from Lucretius) represents the conception of the place music occupies in time: it ends with an extended, repeating theme marked perdendosi (dying away), suggesting that the music continues into infinity. One of her later pieces, 5523 Luminet PH 8 (1999, premiered in Paris, 2003), was named after a newly discovered asteroid.

Brenet died on 5 September 2026, at the age of 90.

== Selected works ==
- Le Faune for flute and piano (1963)
- Les Hommes sur la terre (text Robert Desnos), cantata (1963)
- Flânerie autour d'un ré for three alto saxophones (1964)
- Les Rois mages, cantata for baritone, bass and orchestra (1964)
- Clamavit, oratorio for reciter, soprano, chorus and orchestra (1965)
- Les Visions prophétiques de Cassandre (Aeschylus, adapted by Robert Brasillach), cantata for soprano, bass and orchestra (1965)
- 6 pièces brèves for orchestra (1966)
- Sidérales for orchestra and narrator (1970)
- Hapax for orchestra (1977)
- Tetrapyle, four movements for saxophone quartet and piano (1979)
- Cristaux for mandoline and Celtic harp (1982)
- Vibration for clàrsach and string orchestra (1983)
- Moires for six ondes martenots and strings (1983)
- Lyre d'étoiles, string trio with optional narrator (1984)
- Boustrophedon for flute, clarinet, violin, cello, and piano (1985)
- Vision flamboyante for violin and piano (1987)
- Gémeaux for two saxophone quartets or double quartet (1988)
- Oceanides for piano, left hand (1988)
- Petite suite for twelve saxophones (1989)
- Incandescence for alto or baritone saxophone and piano (1990)
- Madrépores for Celtic harp (1990)
- Aeterno certamine for cellist and alto soloist (1991)
- Odi et armo, suite for violin and orchestra (1992)
- Chimères, concerto for mandolin and string orchestra (1993)
- Aréthuse for flute and Celtic harp (1994)
- Poème for violin and orchestra (1994)
- Le retour de Quetzalcoatl for cello and orchestra (1995)
- 5523 Luminet PH 8 for wind orchestra (1999)
- Au Vent d'Ouest, piano suite (2000)
- Ciels for mixed choir, orchestra and organ (2003)
- Rondel for mixed choir, orchestra and organ (2003)
- 3 préludes for piano (2008)
- Des roses de Paestum à la rose des vents de Dougga for guitar (2009)
- Concerto for cello and small orchestra (2010)
- Le Livre de l'Harmonie du Monde, symphonic poem (2010)
- Double mixte, 4 pièces for piano (2013)
