= Leopold Hofmann =

Austrian composer

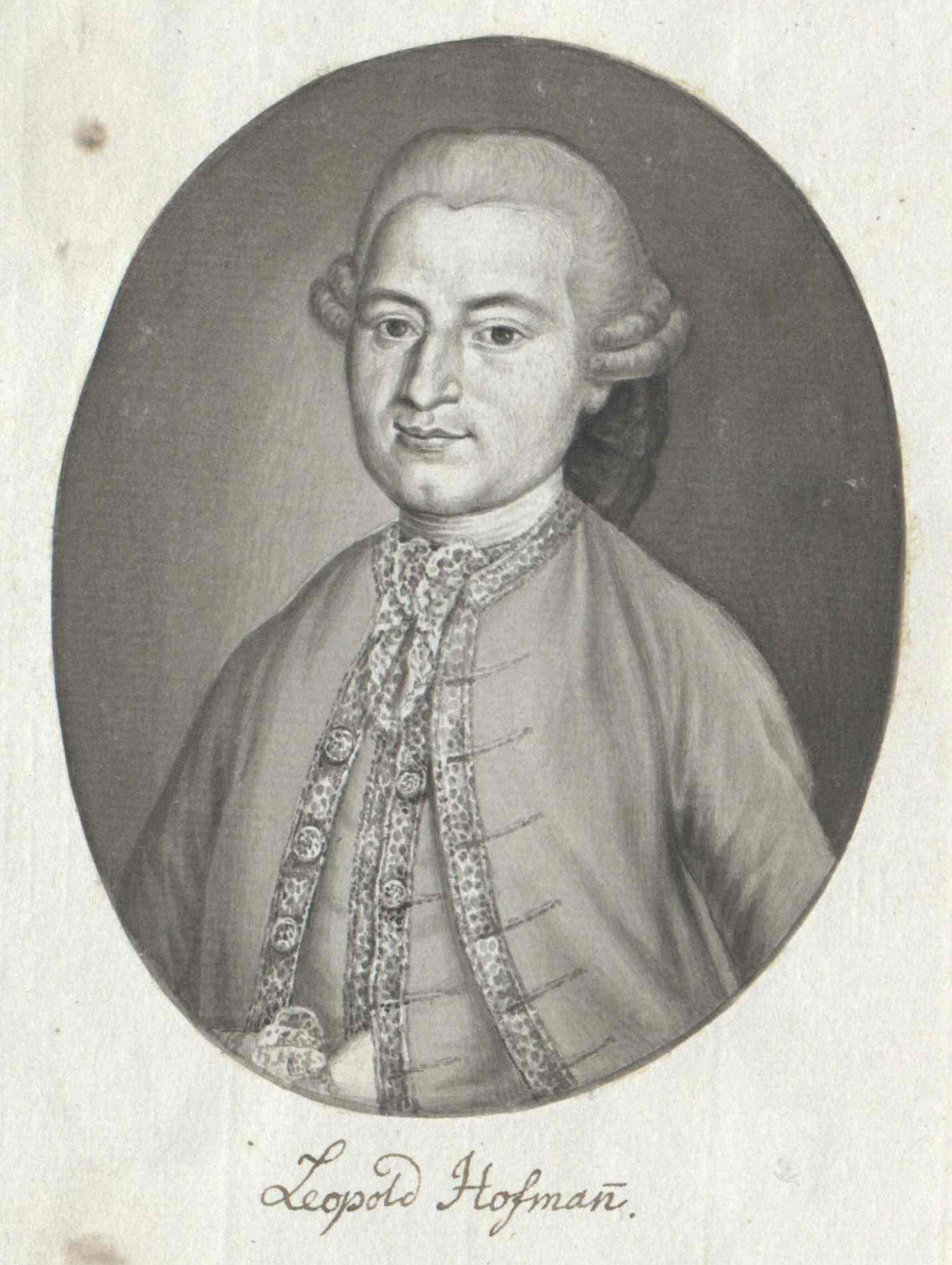
Leopold Hofmann, was an Austrian composer of classical music.

Leopold Hofmann (also Ludwig Hoffman, Leopold Hoffman, Leopold Hoffmann; 14 August 1738 – 17 March 1793) was an Austrian composer of classical music.

== Biography ==
Hofmann was the son of a highly educated civil servant, and at the age of seven became a chorister in the chapel of the Empress Elisabeth Christine, where his choral director and teacher was very likely František Tůma.

He was also a student later on of Georg Christoph Wagenseil and Giuseppe Trani (violin). His studies included at various points violin, harpsichord and composition.

In 1758 Hofmann secured what may have been his first appointment, as "musicus" at St. Michael's. He is known to have become choral director at St. Peter's Church in 1764 and, in 1766, kapellmeister. In 1769 he became a teacher to the royal family.

The position of kapellmeister at the Cathedral of St. Stephan, a post he acquired in 1772, was among his next responsibilities. At this time he declined the directorship of the Imperial Chapel, but did apply there two years later, in 1774, failing in his application. (Giuseppe Bonno became director of the Imperial Chapel, which had become open upon the death of Florian Leopold Gassmann.)

On 9 May 1791, at his own request, Mozart was appointed assistant-Kapellmeister to Hofmann, an unpaid position. At the time Hofmann was ill and Mozart anticipated becoming Kapellmeister upon Hofmann's death. However, Hofmann survived Mozart and kept his post as Cathedral Kapellmeister until he died.

== Selected worklist ==
=== Symphonies ===
The following list was drawn up by George Cook * Kimball in his Ph.D. thesis.

- Kimball A 1. Symphony in A major
- Kimball A 2. Symphony in A major
- Kimball A 3. Symphony in A major
- Kimball A 4. Symphony in A major
- Kimball A 5. Symphony in A major
- Kimball A 6. Symphony in A major
- Kimball A 7. Symphony in A major (lost)
- Kimball A 8. Symphony in A major
- Kimball A 9. Symphony in A major (lost)
- Kimball B 1. Symphony in B♭ major
- Kimball B 2. Symphony in B♭ major
- Kimball B 3. Symphony in B♭ major
- Kimball B 4. Sinfonia pastorella in B♭ major
- Kimball B 5. Symphony in B♭ major
- Kimball B 6. Symphony in B♭ major
- Kimball B 7. Symphony in B♭ major (lost)
- Kimball B 8. Symphony in B♭ major (lost)
- Kimball C 1. Symphony in C major
- Kimball C 2. Symphony in C major
- Kimball C 3. Symphony in C major (lost)
- Kimball C 4. Symphony in C major
- Kimball C 5. Symphony in C major
- Kimball C 6. Symphony in C major
- Kimball C 7. Symphony in C major
- Kimball C 8. Symphony in C major (lost)
- Kimball C 9. Symphony in C major (lost)
- Kimball C10. Symphony in C major
- Kimball C11. Symphony in C major
- Kimball C12. Sinfonia pastorella in C major
- Kimball C13. Symphony in C major
- Kimball C14. Symphony in C major
- Kimball C15. Symphony in C major
- Kimball C16. Symphony in C major (lost)
- Kimball C17. Symphony in C major (lost)

- Kimball D 1. Sinfonia pastorella in D major
- Kimball d 1. Symphony in D minor (lost)
- Kimball D 2. Symphony in D major
- Kimball D 3. Symphony in D major
- Kimball D 4. Symphony in D major
- Kimball D 5. Symphony in D major
- Kimball D 6. Symphony in D major
- Kimball D 7. Symphony in D major
- Kimball D 8. Symphony in D major
- Kimball D 9. Symphony in D major
- Kimball D10. Symphony in D major
- Kimball Es 1. Symphony in E♭ major
- Kimball Es 2. Symphony in E♭ major
- Kimball Es 3. Symphony in E♭ major
- Kimball Es 4. Symphony in E♭ major
- Kimball Es 5. Symphony in E♭ major
- Kimball Es 6. Symphony in E♭ major
- Kimball Es 7. Symphony in E♭ major (lost)
- Kimball Es 8. Symphony in E♭ major
- Kimball F 1. Symphony in F major (lost)
- Kimball F 2. Symphony in F major (lost)
- Kimball F 3. Symphony in F major
- Kimball F 4. Symphony in F major
- Kimball F 5. Symphony in F major
- Kimball F 5. Symphony in F major
- Kimball F 7. Symphony in F major
- Kimball F 8. Symphony in F major
- Kimball G 1. Symphony in G major (lost)
- Kimball G 2. Symphony in G major
- Kimball G 3. Symphony in G major
- Kimball G 4. Sinfonia pastorella in G major
- Kimball G 5. Symphony in G major

=== Concertos ===
The following list was drawn up by Allan * Badley in his Ph.D. thesis.

- Badley I:A 1. Harpsichord Concerto in A major
- Badley I:B 1. Harpsichord Concerto in B♭ major
- Badley I:C 1. Harpsichord Concerto in C major
- Badley I:C 2. Harpsichord Concerto in C major
- Badley I:C 3. Harpsichord Concerto in C major
- Badley I:C 4. Harpsichord Concerto in C major
- Badley I:C 5. Harpsichord Concerto in C major
- Badley I:C 6. Harpsichord Concerto in C major
- Badley I:C 7. Harpsichord Concerto in C major
- Badley I:C 8. Harpsichord Concerto in C major
- Badley I:C 9. Harpsichord Concerto in C major
- Badley I:C10. Harpsichord Concerto in C major
- Badley I:C11. Harpsichord Concerto in C major
- Badley I:C12. Harpsichord Concerto in C major
- Badley I:C13. Harpsichord Concerto in C major
- Badley I:C14. Harpsichord Concerto in C major
- Badley I:C15. Harpsichord Concerto in C major (lost)
- Badley I:C16. Harpsichord Concerto in C major (lost)
- Badley I:D 1. Harpsichord Concerto in D major
- Badley I:D 2. Harpsichord Concerto in D major
- Badley I:F 1. Harpsichord Concerto in F major
- Badley I:F 2. Harpsichord Concerto in F major
- Badley I:F 3. Harpsichord Concerto in F major
- Badley I:F 4. Harpsichord Concerto in F major
- Badley I:F 5. Harpsichord Concerto in F major
- Badley I:F 6. Harpsichord Concerto in F major
- Badley II:A1. Flute Concerto in A major
- Badley II:A2. Flute Concerto in A major
- Badley II:D1. Flute Concerto in D major (previously wrongly attributed to Joseph Haydn Hob. VIIf:1)
- Badley II:D2. Flute Concerto in D major
- Badley II:D3. Flute Concerto in D major
- Badley II:D4. Flute Concerto in D major
- Badley II:D5. Flute Concerto in D major
- Badley II:D6. Flute Concerto in D major
- Badley II:e1. Flute Concerto in E minor
- Badley II:G1. Flute Concerto in G major
- Badley II:G2. Flute Concerto in G major
- Badley II:G3. Flute Concerto in G major
- Badley II:G4. Flute Concerto in G major
- Badley III:C1. Oboe Concerto in C major
- Badley III:C2. Oboe Concerto in C major
- Badley III:C3. Oboe Concerto in C major
- Badley III:d1. Oboe Concerto in D minor
- Badley III:F1. Oboe Concerto in F major
- Badley III:G1. Oboe Concerto in G major

- Badley IV:C1. Bassoon Concerto in C major
- Badley V:C1. Cello Concerto in C major
- Badley V:C2. Cello Concerto in C major
- Badley V:C3. Cello Concerto in C major
- Badley V:C4. Cello Concerto in C major (lost)
- Badley V:D1. Cello Concerto in D major
- Badley V:D2. Cello Concerto in D major
- Badley V:D3. Cello Concerto in D major
- Badley V:D4. Cello Concerto in D major (lost)
- Badley VI:A1. Violin Concerto in A major
- Badley VI:A2. Violin Concerto in A major
- Badley VI:B1. Violin Concerto in B♭ major
- Badley VI:B2. Violin Concerto in B♭ major
- Badley VI:B3. Violin Concerto in B♭ major (lost)
- Badley VI:C1. Violin Concerto in C major
- Badley VI:C2. Violin Concerto in C major (lost)
- Badley VI:D1. Violin Concerto in D major
- Badley VI:G1. Violin Concerto in G major (lost)
- Badley VII:C1. Concerto for oboe & harpsichord in C major
- Badley VII:C2. Concerto for 2 harpsichords in C major
- Badley VII:F1. Concerto for oboe & harpsichord in F major
- Badley VII:G1. Concerto for violin & cello in G major
- Badley VII:G2. Concerto for flute & harpsichord in G major
- Badley VIII:A1. Concertino for violin, viola & cello in A major
- Badley VIII:A2. Concertino for harpsichord, flute, violin & cello in A major
- Badley VIII:B1. Concertino for 2 violins, viola & cello in B♭ major
- Badley VIII:C1. Concertino for cello & 2 oboes in C major
- Badley VIII:C2. Concertino for violin, viola & cello in C major
- Badley VIII:C3. Concertino for harpsichord in C major
- Badley VIII:C4. Concertino for 2 oboes in C major
- Badley VIII:C5. Concertino for viola & cello in C major (lost)
- Badley VIII:C6. Divertimento for harpsichord in C major
- Badley VIII:D1. Concertino for 2 violins, viola & cello in D major
- Badley VIII:D2. Cassatio in D major
- Badley VIII:D3. Concertino for 2 flutes in D major
- Badley VIII:D4. Concertino for viola & cello in D major (lost)
- Badley VIII:D5. Concertino for violin & cello in D major (lost)
- Badley VIII:E1. Concertino for violin & cello in E major
- Badley VIII:Es1. Concertino for violin, viola & cello in E♭ major
- Badley VIII:Es2. Concertino for 2 violas & cello in E♭ major
- Badley VIII:F1. Concertino for 2 violins, viola & cello in F major
- Badley VIII:F2. Concertino for harpsichord in F major
- Badley VIII:F3. Concertino for violin, viola & cello in F major
- Badley VIII:G1. Concertino for harpsichord in G major
- Badley VIII:G2. Concertino for 2 violins, viola & cello in G major

=== Other works ===
- A mass a cappella (republished with masses by Wagenseil and Georg Reutter by A-R Editions in 2004)
- Duos and sonatas for various instruments, including a divertimento for flute and bassoon, one for 2 violins with continuo, one for two violas with bass. His opus 1 is a set of sonatas a tre for viola and violoncello with cello accompaniment.
- Choral music
  - Motet "Altra nocte"
  - "Pastor bone : chorus pastoralis" for mixed choir, concertante organ, two violins and bass (2 oboes, 2 trumpets and drums probably added later).
  - Missa "Sancti Aloysii" in D major
  - Requiem in C minor

(Recent recordings of his music include recordings of many of the concertos, some of the symphonies including five on Naxos Records, etc., including a CD from 2000 of Artaria discoveries and others of cello flute, violin and oboe concertos.)

His compositions have been catalogued by Allan * Badley.
