= Enrico Mainardi =

Italian cellist, composer, and conductor

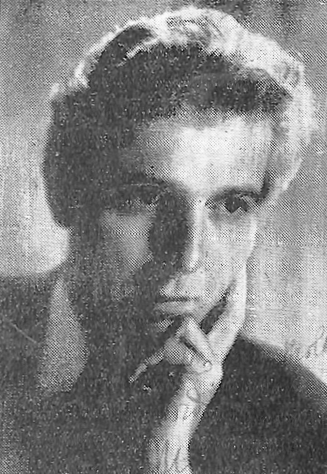
Image of Enrico Mainardi

Enrico Mainardi (19 May 1897 in Milan – 10 April 1976 in Munich) was an Italian cellist, composer, and conductor.

At the age of thirteen, in 1910, Mainardi had already begun his career as a cello virtuoso who toured the concert halls of Europe. He later taught at the Hochschule für Musik in Berlin and the Accademia Nazionale di Santa Cecilia in Rome and also held summer classes in Salzburg and Lucerne. Pupils of his who later became distinguished included Siegfried Palm, Miklós Perényi, Michael Steinkühler, Heidi Litschauer, Erkki Rautio and Joan Dickson.

Together with the pianist Edwin Fischer and the violinist Georg Kulenkampff (whose place was later taken by Wolfgang Schneiderhan), Mainardi formed a famous piano trio. In 1967, he also founded a trio with the pianist Guido Agosti and the flutist Severino Gazzelloni.

As a composer, Mainardi wrote orchestral works, a cello concerto per due violoncelli, and chamber music. He wrote solo sonatas and also the Sonata breve (published by Schott) in 1942.
