= Pekka Kostiainen =

Finnish composer and choral conductor (born 1944)

Pekka Olavi Kostiainen (born March 16, 1944) is a Finnish composer and choral conductor.

Kostiainen was born in Jyväskylä, Finland, and graduated from the Sibelius Academy in 1968. He continued his composing studies with Professor Jouko Tolonen and completed his composing diploma in 1973. He completed postgraduate studies with Einar Englund, Joonas Kokkonen and Einojuhani Rautavaara.

He served as a cantor at the Pohja Finnish Parish from 1969 to 1971, and as a lecturer at the University of Jyväskylä from 1971 to 2000. Since 2000 he has worked as a composer and choral conductor.

He is widely known abroad, especially as a choral music composer. In Jyväskylä, from 1977 to 2018 Kostiainen led the Musica Choir, which he founded, and from 1994 to 2008 he was director of the Vox Aurea children's choir. In 2004, he was awarded an honorary doctorate at the University of Jyväskylä. Kostiainen was elected Chief Choir of the Year in 2005. Alba Records has released eight CDs with Kostiainen conducting his own works with his own choirs. Kostiainen is a relative of Finnish author Ilmari Kianto.
