= Grigoriy Korchmar =

Russian musician (1947–2025)

- Григорий Корчмар
- Born: 1947; Baltiysk, Kaliningrad Oblast, Russian SFSR, USSR
- Died: 17 November 2025 (aged 77)
- Education: Saint Petersburg Conservatory
- Occupations: Composer, pianist

Grigoriy Korchmar (Russian: Григорий Овшиевич Корчмар, Grigorij Ovšievič Korčmar; alternately translated Grigori or Grigory) (1947 – 17 November 2025) was a Russian composer and pianist.

Although little-known outside his native Russia, Korchmar was a prominent figure in the musical life of Saint Petersburg. He began to study piano and composition in 1958 at the Nikolai Rimsky-Korsakov Conservatory in Leningrad (now St Petersburg). In 1996, he was made an "Honoured Art Worker of Russia".

Notable works by Korchmar include the operas Newlyweds (1970), A Story about Boris and Gleb (1981) and Fedra (1984), Dialogues for cello and piano (1976), Tango macabre for violin and piano (1985), White Nights Serenades (1991) for solo guitar and four symphonies, the latest of which was completed in 2003.

Korchmar's brother, Leonid Korchmar is a conductor of the Mariinsky Theatre and a notable conducting pedagogue.

Korchmar died on 17 November 2025, at the age of 77.

== Works ==
- 4 symphonies
- Sonata dolorosa for cello and piano
- Concerto for trumpet and string orchestra
- Dear Sergei Sergeich! Concerto-message to S. S. Prokofiev. For violin with orchestra
- "... Whom my soul loves...". Poem for piano
- Goodbye, dear friend. Fantasy on a theme by V. Gavrilin for two pianos
- The quarrel of Lensky with Onegin. Waltz-paraphrase for violin and piano
- "Serenades of white nights, or Petersburg serenades". Suite for guitar.
- Vocal cycles: "Songs of sorrow and consolation", "Reflections", "Pushkin epigrams", "Songs of separation" and others.
- Operas
- Ballets

== Sources ==
- Official Site of "Grigoriy Korchmar" | Saint-Petersburg Contemporary Music Resource Center
- Compozitor biography
