= Gordon Shi-Wen Chin =

Taiwanese composer and conductor

Gordon Chin or Chin Shi-wen (Chinese: 金希文; born 1957) is a Taiwanese composer and conductor. He is a member of the faculty of National Taiwan Normal University. He earned his doctoral degree at the Eastman School of Music under Christopher Rouse and Samuel Adler. As one of Taiwan's most prolific composers, his works have been performed by the Seattle Symphony Orchestra, San Diego Symphony Orchestra, and Vancouver Symphony Orchestra, as well as by ensembles in Tokyo (Euodia Orchestra), France (Ensemble 2e2m), the International Sejong Soloists (United States), and many others. The Los Angeles Times has called him a "confident master of the Western modernistic large orchestral idiom used for dramatic rather than abstract purposes." Chin is now the music director of the Yinqi Chorus & Orchestra.
