= Leonid Korchmar =

Russian conductor (born 1943)

Leonid Ovseevich Korchmar (Russian: Леонид Овсеевич Корчмар; born November 9, 1943) is a Russian conductor. Since 1989 he has been a conductor in the Mariinsky Theatre (former Kirov Ballet and Opera) in St. Petersburg. Having studied with Ilya Musin, he now also teaches operatic and symphonic conducting in the St Petersburg Conservatory.

He worked with the orchestras in Voronezh and Sverdlovsk, and led the Saratov Philharmonic Symphony Orchestra in 1979-1984.
