= Vladimír Soukup =

Czech composer

Vladimír Soukup (20 February 1930 – 3 March 2012) was a Czech post-romantic composer.

== Biography ==
Vladimír Soukup was born in Prague, capital of the Czech Republic. He first studied privately the composition with Zdeněk Hůla, then in 1955 he studied with composer Jaroslav Řídký at the Prague Academy of Performing Arts. His output can be divided in two main categories. Regarding "absolute" music, orchestral and chamber music has always been Soukup's main concern. In particular he wrote during his whole career a large number of sonatas and concertos for various instruments. Apart from the Concerto for Trombone, Strings and Timpani (1967), written for Miloslav Hejda, all his concertos and sonatas have not been composed for specific performers, but include specific features of the techniques of each instrument. So, although virtuosic, they are relatively easy to play. This part of Soukup's output also includes four symphonies and several shorter orchestral and chamber compositions. From the 1970s, a second trend began in Soukup's output with the composition of many stage works (operas, ballets) and choral/vocal works. Nearly all of them (cantatas, cycles of songs, works for choir) are based on Czech texts and poems. All of these compositions, ranging from the post-romantic style to a more modernist (but still tonal/melodic) one, are overall expressionistic, written in an always dramatic mood. His works have been compared to Prokofiev, Martinů, Honegger and Bartók. A published piano reduction score of his Piano Concerto is held in the Gorno Music Library at the college-Conservatory of Music, The University of Cincinnati (Ohio, USA). In the same library are typeset librettos and typeset piano scores of his opera Susy in Bath, plus a published score and parts for his Trio for Violin, Cello and Piano. Soukup told: "I want to attract contemporary listener not by sound effects or technical experiment, but by convincing emotional confession." Vladimír Soukup died on 3 March 2012, aged 82.

== Works ==
The following lists show all his compositions in the genre symphony, and selected works in the other genres.

=== Symphonies ===
- Symphony No. 1 Youth (1954). 25'
- Symphony No. 2 Dramatic (1962). 25'
- Symphony No. 3 Canto allegro (Song of Joy) with solo saxophone (1964). 25'
- Symphony No. 4 Sinfonia da camera (1969). 14'
- Festival March for wind orchestra (1965). 5'30

=== Concertos ===
- Piano Concerto (1961). 25'
- Sonata for English Horn (or Trumpet), Strings and Piano (1966). 15'
- Concerto for Trombone, Strings and Timpani (1967). 14'
- Concerto for French Horn and Strings (1970). 17'
- Concerto for Tenor Saxophone and orchestra (1970). 18'
- Cello Concerto (1972). 20'
- Violin Concerto (1978). 21'

=== Chamber and Instrumental Works ===
- Sonata for Viola and Piano (1961)
- Three Sonnets for Bass Clarinet (or Bassoon) and Piano (1961)
- Sonata for Violin and Piano (1963)
- Sonata for Cello and Piano (1964)
- Trio for Violin, Cello and Piano (1965)
- Sonata for Trumpet and Piano (1966)
- Woodwind Quintet (1967)
- Music for Organ (1967)
- Piano Sonata No. 1 (1969)
- Sonata for Flute and Piano (1969)
- String Quartet (1970)
- Sonata for Oboe and Piano (1970)
- Piano Sonata No. 2 (1972)
- Polkas for Piano (1980)
- City Lights, for Saxophone Quartet (1984). 14'
- Pohádka (Fairy Tale), for Flute and Harp (19??). 9'
- Sonata for B-flat Clarinet and Piano (19??)
- Sonata for Bass-Clarinet, Piano and Percussions (19??)
- Imaginationi I for solo Bass Clarinet (19??)

=== Stage Works (Operas, Ballets and Musical Plays) ===
- Francois Villon, ballet from the life of the French poet of the 15th century (1960)
- The Sun above the River, musical play (1973)
- The Green Valley, musical play (1975)
- Cleopatra, opera, libretto after William Shakespeare's play (1976)
- Susy in Bath, opera buffa to a contemporary subject (1977)
- The Rebellion, opera to a historical subject from the 18th century (1980)
- The Beetles, fairy-tale ballet to the composer's libretto, after Jan Karafiat's book for children "Little Beetles" (1981)

=== Vocal and Choral Works (Cantatas, Cycles of Songs and Choruses) ===
- The Songs of My Home, four songs for tenor and piano (texts by M. Florian) (1956)
- Cantata Futura for choir, orchestra and narrator (1963). 22'
- Erotic Songs, four songs for contralto, flute and piano (texts by Anna Akhmatova) (1964)
- The Fire Summer, three songs for baritone and piano (texts by Stanislav Kostka Neumann) (1968)
- The Woman, three songs for soprano and piano (texts by Fráňa Šrámek) (1968)
- Czech Home, three songs for baritone and piano (1972)
- Love Songs, three mixed choir a cappella (1974). 13'
- Homeland, cantata for choir and orchestra (19??). 17'

== Sources ==
- Vladimír Soukup Czech Music Information Centre
