= Concerto Grosso (Zwilich) =

Composition by Ellen Taaffe Zwilich

The Concerto Grosso 1985 (to Handel's Sonata in D for violin and continuo, first movement) is a composition for chamber orchestra by the American composer Ellen Taaffe Zwilich. The work was commissioned by the Washington Friends of Handel in commemoration of the 300th anniversary of the birth of George Frideric Handel. It was given its world premiere by Handel Festival Orchestra conducted by Stephen Simon on May 9, 1986.

== Composition ==
=== Background ===
The Concerto Grosso liberally quotes the theme from the first movement of George Frideric Handel's Violin sonata in D major (HWV 371). In the score program note, Zwilich wrote, "I performed the work many years ago and I especially love the opening theme of the first movement—the striking head motive and the beauty of the generative tension between the theme and the elegant bass line." The piece thus mixes musical techniques of the Baroque era with the Zwilich's own neo-Romantic style, which the composer described as a "twentieth-century response to the spirit of George Frideric Handel."

=== Structure ===
The Concerto Grosso has a performance duration of approximately 15 minutes and is cast in five short movements:

1. Maestoso
2. Presto
3. Largo
4. Presto
5. Maestoso

=== Instrumentation ===
The work is scored for a chamber orchestra consisting of flute, two oboes (2nd doubling Cor anglais), two horns, harpsichord, and strings.

== Reception ==
Reviewing a 1988 performance of the Concerto Grosso, Michael Kimmelman of The New York Times wrote, "The work's five, clearly defined and intelligently-shaped movements last a total of 15 minutes; that's just the right amount. They form a musical arch, with the first and final sections marked maestoso and consisting of sections from Handel's D major Violin Sonata that alternated with knottier passages of Ms. Zwilich's creation. The second and fourth sections include identically relentless, slightly manic material, and they frame a central largo: the work's climax, its dark grandeur, includes repeated notes that ring out like tolling bells." He added, "The journey from Handel's lucid phrases at the beginning, through the stormy passages coloring the middle sections and back to the quotations of Handel's regal sonata at the very end, describe a touching homage to the Baroque composer. In the midst of such storm and fury, his melodies come as signs of stability and redemption." Reviewing a 1992 performance, Joan Reinthaler of The Washington Post similarly wrote, "This is a nicely conceived and crafted five-movement work built largely on the first four notes of the Handel Violin Sonata No. 4. It is cheerful, straightforward music and received a first-rate reading that was introduced by violinist Sally McLain's touchingly simple performance of the first movement of the Handel sonata itself."

Reviewing a 1995 album that pairs the work with Zwilich's Symphony No. 3 and Oboe Concerto, Michael Oliver of Gramophone wrote, "The best music here by far is the Concerto grosso, whose outer sections are orchestral variants of a Handel sonata (Op. 1 No. 1), the three inner movements much more personal meditations on it. The central Largo has more sustained invention and intensity of feeling than symphony and concerto put together." Annette Morreau of BBC Music Magazine was more critical of the piece, writing, "the Concerto Grosso, is an academically 'correct', 20th-century pastiche of Handel with Coplandish wide-open-prairie strings to clanky harpsichord, 'wrong-note' 18th-century harmonies and played with (inauthentic?) full-blooded vibrato."

== See also ==
- List of concerti grossi
