= Oboe Concerto (Zwilich) =

20th-century oboe concerto by Ellen Taaffe Zwilich

The Concerto for Oboe and Orchestra is a composition for oboe solo and orchestra by the American composer Ellen Taaffe Zwilich. The work was commissioned by the Cleveland Orchestra in honor of their principal oboist John Mack's 25th year with the orchestra. It was first performed by Mack and the Cleveland Orchestra under the direction of Christoph von Dohnányi on January 17, 1991. The piece is dedicated "with affection" to John Mack.

== Composition ==
The concerto is cast in a single extended movement and has a performance duration of approximately 20 minutes.

=== Instrumentation ===
The music is scored for solo oboe and an orchestra comprising piccolo, flute, an additional oboe, Oboe d'amore, English horn, two clarinets, bassoon, contrabassoon, four horns in F, two cornets, timpani, percussion, and strings.

== Reception ==
Reviewing the East Coast premiere at Carnegie Hall, Bernard Holland of The New York Times wrote, "Ms. Zwilich is as always an excellent craftsman. Her ideas, often in short bursts of phrase, are transformed and moved around the orchestra. There is a clean, almost chamber-music quality to the orchestration that never swallows Mr. Mack's excellent playing. Double-reeds from within the ensemble frequently answer him, giving a feeling of sympathetic vibration rather than sharp contrast." He added, "This is as strong and convincing a piece from her as I can remember."

Reviewing the concerto on album with Zwilich's Symphony No. 3 and Concerto Grosso, Michael Oliver of Gramophone remarked that the concerto "agreeably exploits the instrument's capacity for lyricism and ingeniously provides it with a 'family' (a second oboe, oboe d'amore and cor anglais) with which it can have more intimate conversations than with the main orchestra, but the music does not so much develop as alternate between slow and fast ideas." Annette Morreau of BBC Music Magazine was highly critical of the piece, saying, "The 1990 Oboe Concerto is played by the oboist for whom it was written, John Mark, a musician of distinction. Alas, the work has no such distinction."
