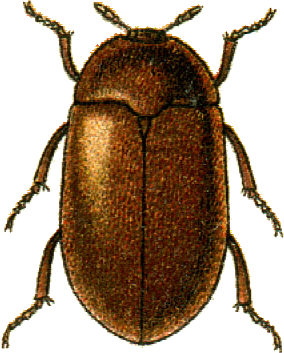

Scientific classification
- Kingdom: Animalia
- Phylum: Arthropoda
- Class: Insecta
- Order: Coleoptera
- Suborder: Polyphaga
- Family: Dermestidae
- Tribe: Attagenini
- Genus: Novelsis
- Species: N. uteana

Binomial name
- Novelsis uteana Casey, 1900

= Novelsis uteana =

Species of beetle

Novelsis uteana is a species of carpet beetle in the family Dermestidae. It is found in North America.
