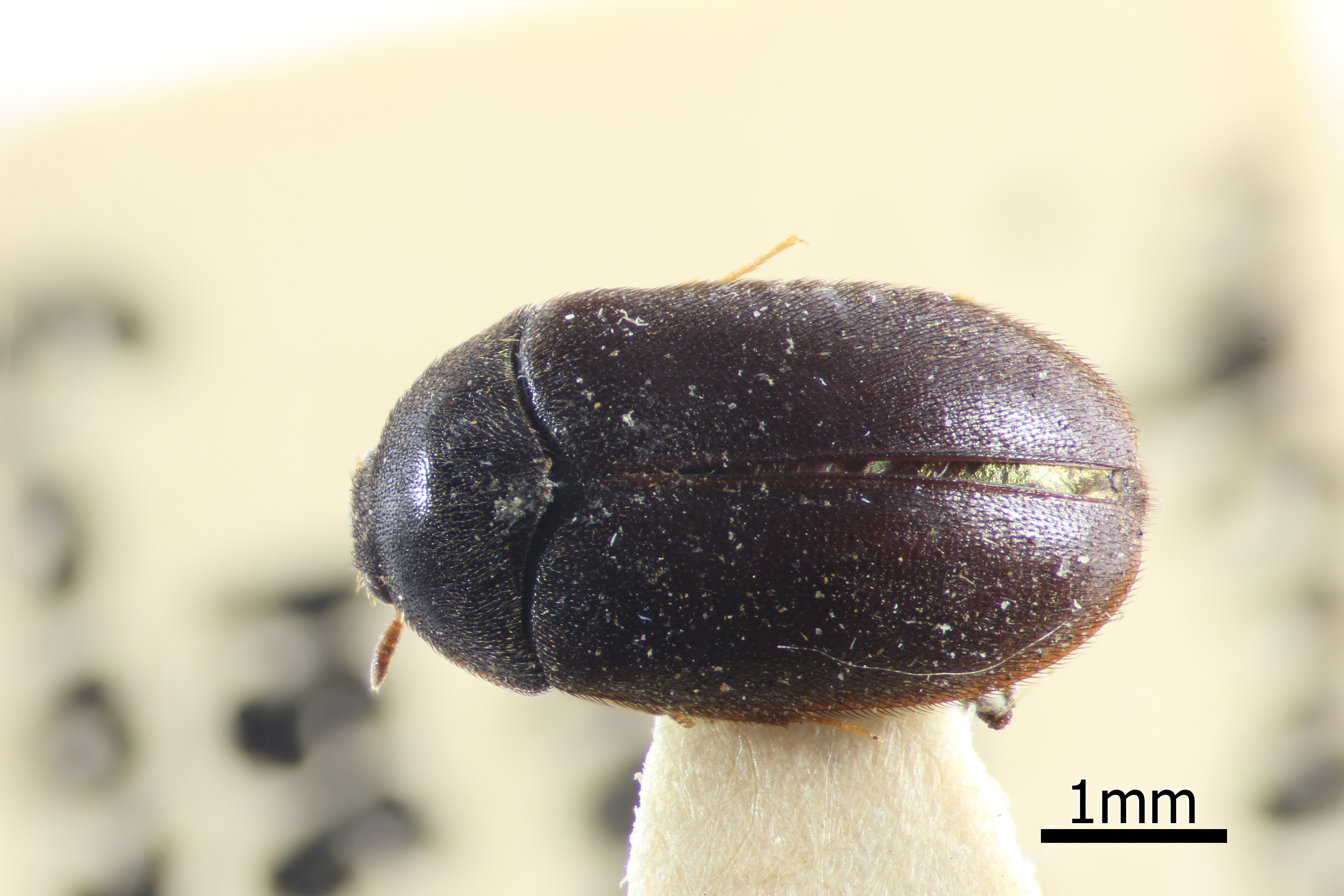

Scientific classification
- Kingdom: Animalia
- Phylum: Arthropoda
- Clade: Pancrustacea
- Class: Insecta
- Order: Coleoptera
- Suborder: Polyphaga
- Family: Dermestidae
- Tribe: Attagenini
- Genus: Attagenus
- Species: A. schaefferi

Binomial name
- Attagenus schaefferi (Herbst, 1792)

= Attagenus schaefferi =

Species of beetle

Attagenus schaefferi is a species of carpet beetle in the family Dermestidae. It is found in North America.

== Subspecies ==
These two subspecies belong to the species Attagenus schaefferi:

- Attagenus schaefferi hypar Beal, 1970^{i c g}
- Attagenus schaefferi spurcus LeConte, 1874^{i c g}

Data sources: i = ITIS, c = Catalogue of Life, g = GBIF, b = Bugguide.net

== See also ==
Commonly confused with species:

- Attagenus unicolor
- Attagenus brunneus
