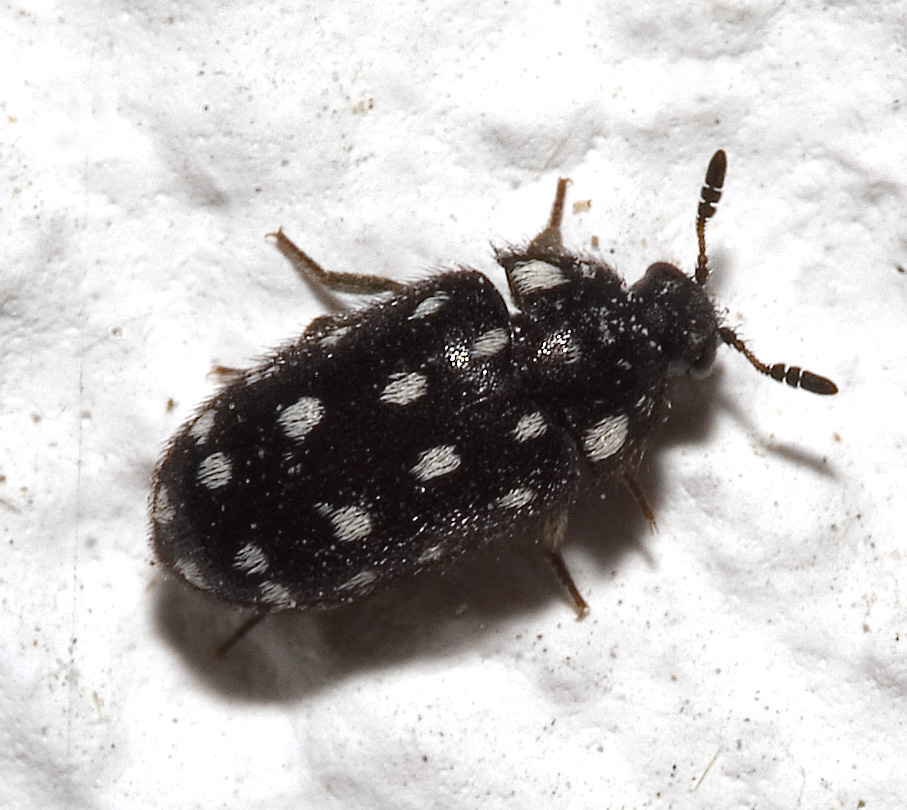
- Lanorus punctatus, known from Europe

Scientific classification
- Kingdom: Animalia
- Phylum: Arthropoda
- Clade: Pancrustacea
- Class: Insecta
- Order: Coleoptera
- Suborder: Polyphaga
- Family: Dermestidae
- Tribe: Attagenini
- Genus: Lanorus; Mulsant & Rey, 1868

Synonyms
- Novelsis subgenus Paranovelsis Casey, 1900; Genattus Sharp, 1902; Paranovelsis: Háva in Zahradník & Háva, 2014

= Lanorus =

Genus of beetles

Lanorus (formerly Paranovelsis) is a genus of beetles in the family Dermestidae, containing the following species:

== Species ==
According to World Dermestidae catalogue, these species currently belong to genus Lanorus:

=== Species group "varicolor" ===
Species are generally found in South and North America (with exception of Lanorus aequalis)

- Lanorus adspersus (Blanchard in Orbigny, 1843) – Bolivia
- Lanorus aequalis (Sharp, 1902) – Mexico (Baja California, Veracruz), United States (Columbia, Delaware, Maryland, North Carolina, Oklahoma, Pennsylvania, Texas, Virginia, West Virginia). Introduced to Europe: Finland, France, Italy, Romania, Spain, Switzerland
- Lanorus anumbiusi (Háva, 2016) – Argentina
- Lanorus bitaeniatus (Steinheil, 1869) – Argentina, Brazil, Bolivia, Chile, Paraguay. Introduced to New Zealand
- Lanorus diiorioi (Háva in Háva & Turienzo, 2019) – Argentina
- Lanorus gounellei (Pic, 1915) – Brazil
- Lanorus harpiae (Háva, 2019) – Chile
- Lanorus inexpectatus (Herrmann & Háva, 2016) – Argentina
- Lanorus mcdonaldi (Herrmann & Háva, 2021) – United States (California)
- Lanorus platanegrachei (Herrmann & Háva, 2014) – Argentina, Chile
- Lanorus perplexus (Jayne, 1882) – Canada (British Columbia), United States (California, Idaho, Montana, Nevada, Oregon, Washington)
- Lanorus varicolor (Jayne, 1882) – Mexico (Sonora), United States (Arizona, California, Nevada, New Mexico, New York, Texas, West Virginia)
- Lanorus venezuelae (Háva, 2013) – Venezuela
- Lanorus venustus (Háva, 2014) – Ecuador

=== Species group "pantherinus" ===
Mostly Asian species, with some found in parts of Europe

- Lanorus hadesi (Kadej & Háva, 2014) – Turkey
- Lanorus jelineki (Háva, 2004) – Turkey, Iran
- Lanorus maculatus (Kalík, 2006) – Albania, Bulgaria, Greece
- Lanorus pantherinus (Ahrens, 1814) – Europe, Western Russia, Caucasus region, Turkey
- Lanorus quadricolor (Sumakov, 1907) – Armenia, Turkey, Central Asia, Mongolia

=== Species group "punctatus" ===
European and Asian species. Lanorus punctatus (previously Attagenus punctatus) is most known due to its big distribution range

- Lanorus hyrcanus (Zhantiev, 2009) – Azerbaijan, Iran
- Lanorus moravicus (Háva, 2018) – Czech Republic, Ukraine
- Lanorus punctatus (Scopoli, 1772) – Europe: Austria, Croatia, Czech Republic, Denmark, France, Germany, Hungary, Italy (with Sicily), Netherlands, Poland, Romania, Serbia, Slovakia, Spain, Sweden, Switzerland, Ukraine. Western Russia and Azerbaijan
- Lanorus siteki (Háva, 2020) – Croatia, Greece

== See also ==
- Novelsis
- Attagenus
