= Novelsis horni =

Scientific classification
- Domain: Eukaryota
- Kingdom: Animalia
- Phylum: Arthropoda
- Class: Insecta
- Order: Coleoptera
- Suborder: Polyphaga
- Family: Dermestidae
- Tribe: Attagenini
- Genus: Novelsis
- Species: N. horni

Binomial name
- Novelsis horni (Jayne, 1882)

Species of beetle

Novelsis horni is a species of carpet beetle in the family Dermestidae. It is found in North America and Europe.
