= Symphony No. 4 (Zwilich) =

Symphony No. 4, The Gardens, is a choral symphony for chorus, children's choir, and orchestra by the American composer Ellen Taaffe Zwilich. The work was composed in 1999 on a commission from the Michigan State University in honor of John D. Withrow and Dortha J. Withrow, to whom the work is dedicated. It was first performed by the Michigan State University Orchestra, Choral Ensembles, and Children's Chorus conducted by Leon Gregorian on February 5, 2000.

== Composition ==
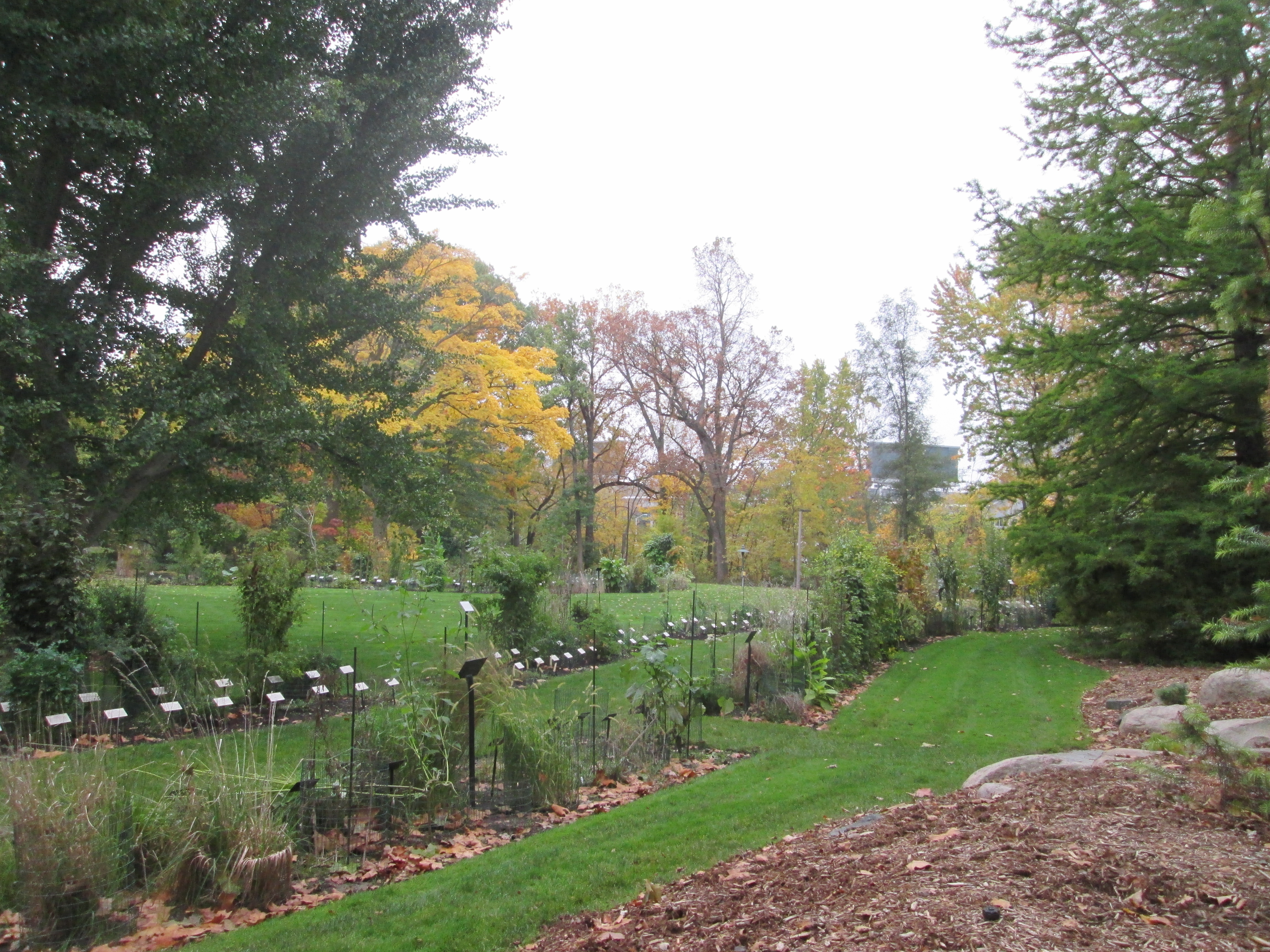
The symphony was inspired by various gardens at Michigan State University, including the W. J. Beal Botanical Garden (pictured).

=== Background ===
The Fourth Symphony was inspired by various gardens on the Michigan State University campus in East Lansing, Michigan.

The first movement "Introduction: Litany of Endangered Plants" is scored for orchestra and chorus. Its text consists of the Latin names for various threatened and endangered plants exhibited in the W. J. Beal Botanical Garden. In the score program note, Zwilich noted, "This garden provides a living example of our human urge to plant and nurture as well as our capacity to uproot and destroy, and I found myself thinking about it long after the day of my visit to the gardens on the campus of Michigan State."

The second movement "Meditation on Living Fossils" is scored for orchestra only. It was inspired by the "Living Fossils" exhibit at the Beal garden, which the composer found "particularly moving and exciting."

The third movement "A Pastoral Journey" is scored for chorus, orchestra, and the children's choir playing handbells. Its text was adapted from the Bible by the composer. Rather than reference a specific garden, this movement "simply offers a musical celebration of them."

The final movement "The Children's Promise" is scored for full forces and was inspired by the Michigan 4-H Children's Garden, which the composer described as "a place of powerful beauty and delightful education." She added, "I was moved by the care given to helping children understand their need to cherish and preserve the natural world they inherit." The text for this movement was written by Erik LaMont, which interprets a Native American lyric for the children's chorus and uses the Latin names of plants from the 4-H Garden for the adult chorus.

=== Structure ===
The symphony has a duration of approximately 28 minutes in performance and is cast in four movements:

1. Introduction: Litany of Endangered Plants
2. Meditation on Living Fossils
3. A Pastoral Journey
4. The Children's Promise

=== Instrumentation ===
The work is scored for SATB chorus, children's choir, and a large orchestra comprising piccolo, two flutes, two oboes, English horn, two clarinets, bass clarinet, two bassoons, contrabassoon, four horns, three trumpets, two trombones, bass trombone, tuba, timpani, three percussionists, and strings.

== Reception ==
ClassicsToday described the symphony as "clearly Zwilich's best symphonic work to date."
