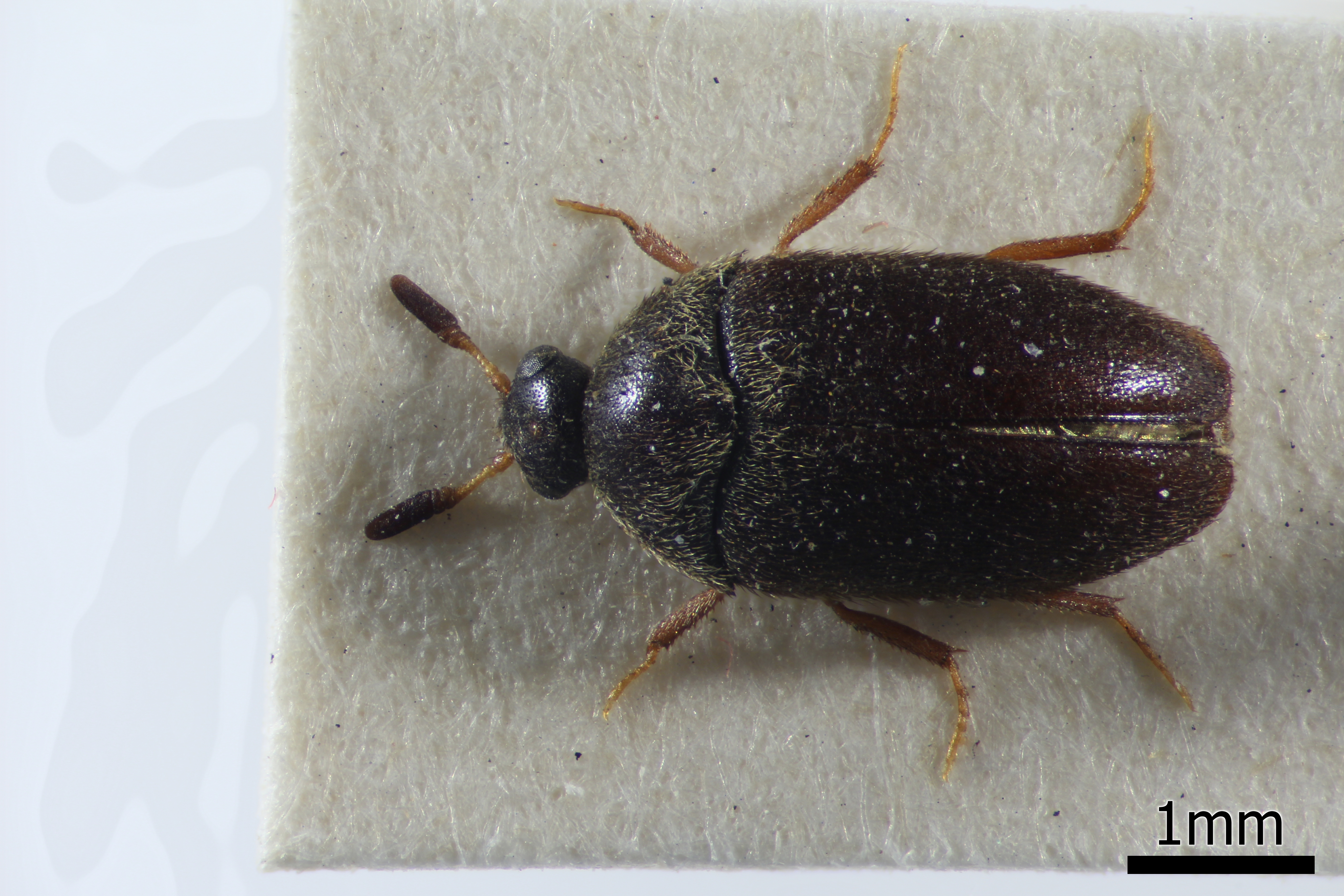

Scientific classification
- Kingdom: Animalia
- Phylum: Arthropoda
- Clade: Pancrustacea
- Class: Insecta
- Order: Coleoptera
- Suborder: Polyphaga
- Family: Dermestidae
- Tribe: Attagenini
- Genus: Attagenus
- Species: A. brunneus

Binomial name
- Attagenus brunneus Faldermann, 1835

= Attagenus brunneus =

Species of beetle

Attagenus brunneus is a 2.9–5mm long species of carpet beetle in the family Dermestidae, found in North America and Europe. It is a detritovorous alien invasive species in Europe, living in buildings.

== See also ==
Could be confused with species:

- Attagenus unicolor
- Attagenus schaefferi
