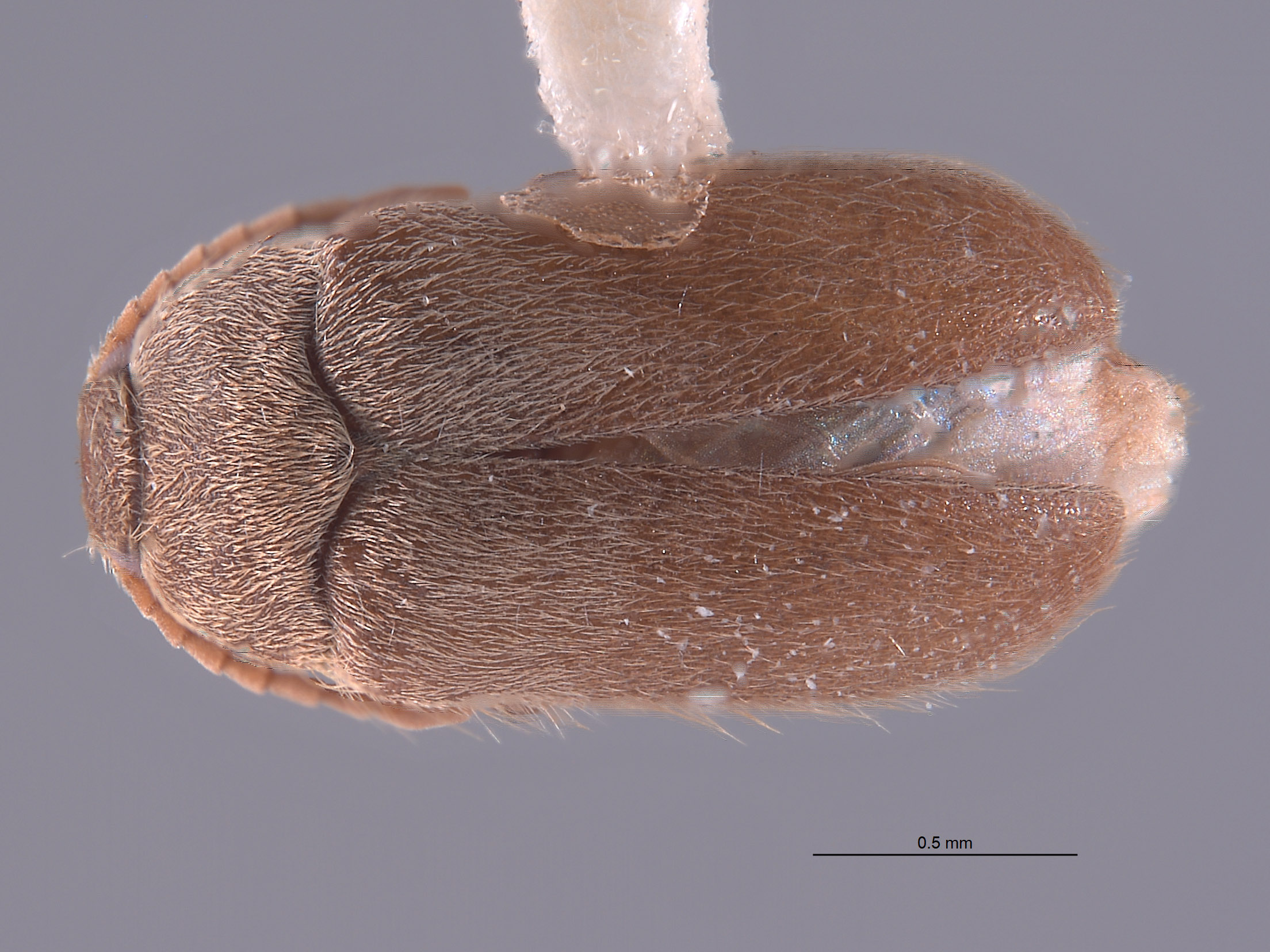
- Dorsal image
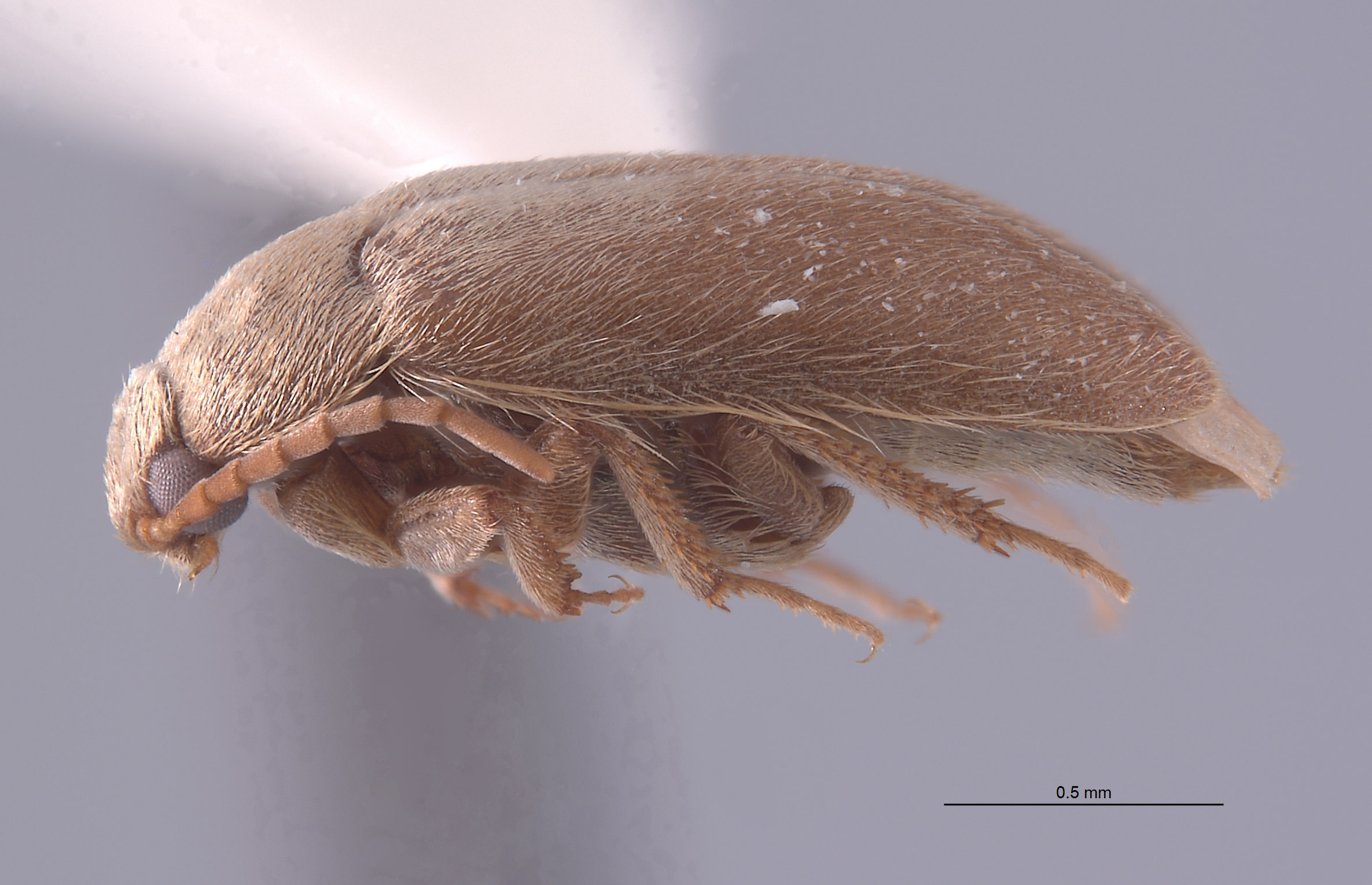
- Lateral image

Scientific classification
- Domain: Eukaryota
- Kingdom: Animalia
- Phylum: Arthropoda
- Class: Insecta
- Order: Coleoptera
- Suborder: Polyphaga
- Family: Dermestidae
- Genus: Egidyella
- Species: E. arcana

Binomial name
- Egidyella arcana Beal and Zhantiev

= Egidyella arcana =

Species of insect

Egidyella arcana is a beetle species identified by William James Beal and Rustem Zhantiev in 2001. Egidyella arcana is part of the genus Egidyella and the meadows family. The Catalog of Life does not list any subspecies.

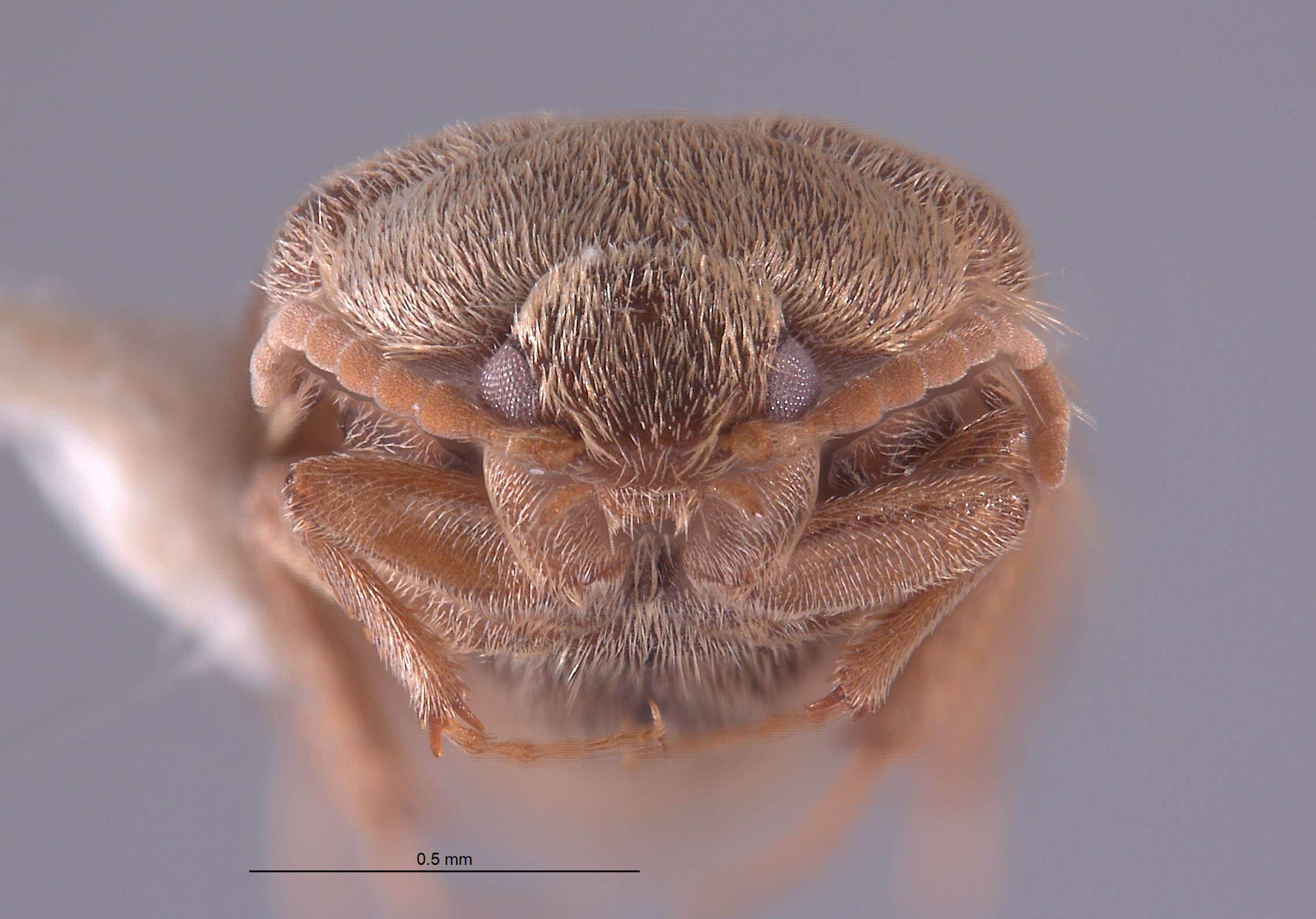
Adult Egidyella arcana. Head view
