= Violin Concerto (Zwilich) =

The Concerto for Violin and Orchestra is violin concerto by the American composer Ellen Taaffe Zwilich. The work was commissioned by Carnegie Hall for the violinist Pamela Frank. It was completed on May 25, 1997, and was first performed by Pamela Frank and the Orchestra of St. Luke's conducted by Hugh Wolff in Carnegie Hall on March 26, 1998.

== Composition ==
The Violin Concerto has a duration of approximately 26 minutes in performance and is cast in three numbered movements. In the score program note, Zwilich described the piece as "a very personal and deeply felt contemporary response to the instrument I have been closest to throughout my musical life."

=== Instrumentation ===
The work is scored for a solo violin and an orchestra consisting of piccolo, flute, oboe, English horn, clarinet, bass clarinet, bassoon, contrabassoon, two horns, two trumpets, timpani, harp, and strings.

== Reception ==
Reviewing the world premiere, Allan Kozinn of The New York Times wrote, "Mainly, the concerto is Ms. Zwilich's love song to the violin, the instrument she studied and played before her composing career got under way. Writing with the young violinist Pamela Frank in mind, she filled the violin line with music that suits her and temperament: lyricism and warmth are more central to the work than overt virtuosity, but the piece demands vitality and agility as well. Ms. Frank made the solo line sing beautifully." Peter Dickinson of Gramophone remarked, "There's a kind of Prokofiev/Walton flavour to the rising figure that opens the work and recurs with adaptations throughout. The second movement is based on Bach's magisterial Chaconne for solo violin, which is elaborated to an almost sinister climax over the firm basis of its rhythm. The finale contains jazzy rhythms but ends quietly."

Reflecting on the work in 2009, the music critic Lawrence A. Johnson of the Chicago Classical Review described it as "a brooding, darkly impassioned landscape" and an "inexplicably neglected" concerto.
