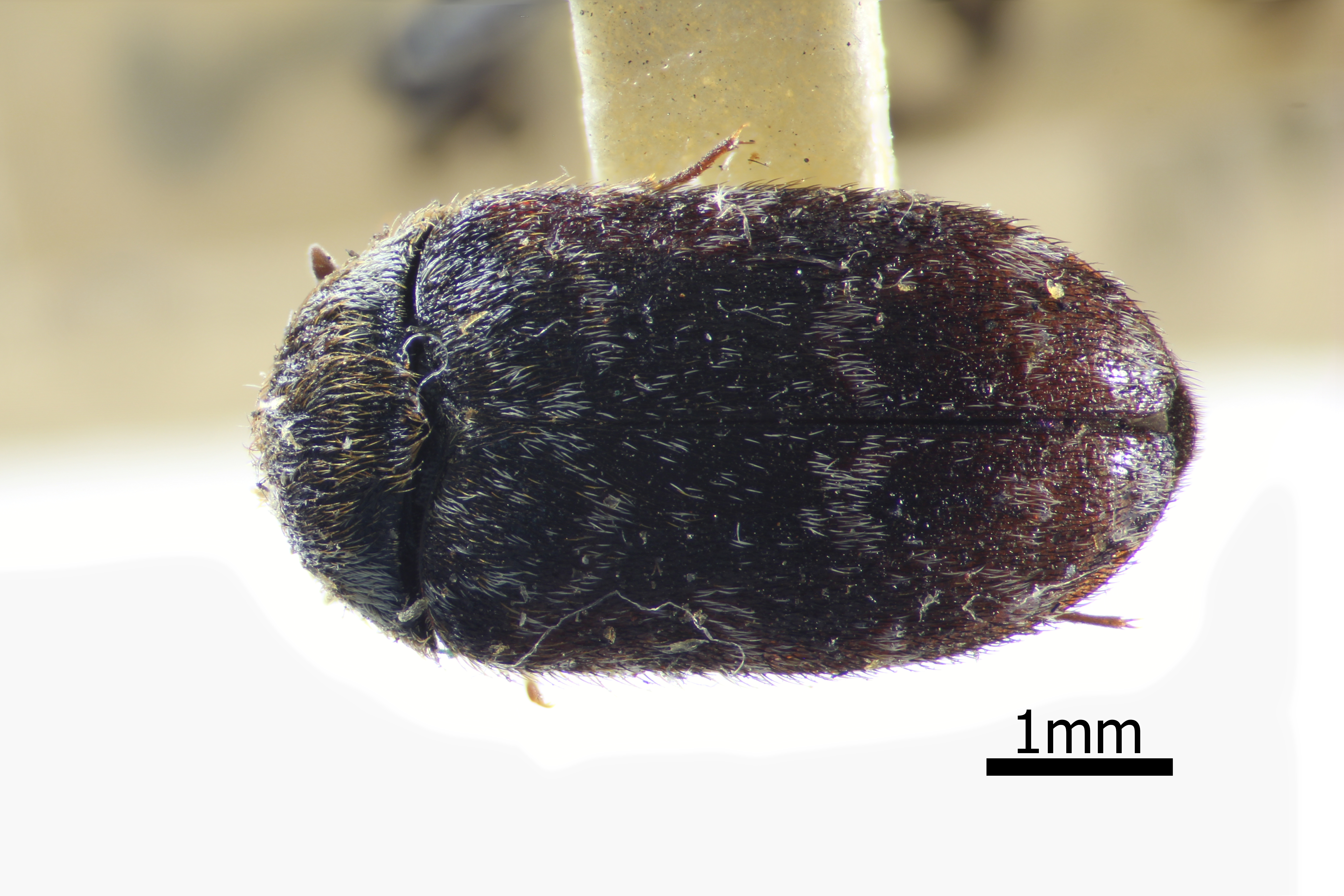

Scientific classification
- Kingdom: Animalia
- Phylum: Arthropoda
- Class: Insecta
- Order: Coleoptera
- Suborder: Polyphaga
- Family: Dermestidae
- Genus: Lanorus
- Species: L. pantherinus

Binomial name
- Lanorus pantherinus Ahrens, 1814

Synonyms
- Dermestes pantherinus Ahrens, 1814; Attagenus pantherinus (Ahrens, 1814); Trogoderma pantherinum Schmidt, 1844; Paranovelsis pantherinus (Ahrens, 1814)

= Lanorus pantherinus =

Species of beetle

Lanorus pantherinus (previously known under genera names Attagenus and Paranovelsis) is a species of carpet beetle in the family Dermestidae. It is found in Europe, Western Russia, Caucasus region and Turkey.
