= Ellen Taaffe Zwilich =

American composer (born 1939)

- Born: Ellen Taaffe; April 30, 1939 (age 87); Miami, Florida, U.S.
- Education: Florida State University
- Occupations: Pianist; Composer; Academic teacher
- Era: Contemporary
- Awards: Pulitzer Prize for Music; Florida Artists Hall of Fame

Ellen Taaffe Zwilich (/teɪf ˈzwɪlɪk/ tayf ZWIL-ik; born April 30, 1939) is an American composer, the first female composer to win the Pulitzer Prize for Music. Her early works are marked by atonal exploration, but by the late 1980s, she had shifted to a postmodernist, neoromantic style. She has been called "one of America's most frequently played and genuinely popular living composers." She was a 1994 inductee into the Florida Artists Hall of Fame. Zwilich has served as the Francis Eppes Distinguished Professor at Florida State University.

== Biography ==
Ellen Taaffe was born in Miami, Florida. She began her music studies as a violinist, earning a bachelor of music degree from Florida State University in 1960. She moved to New York City to play with the American Symphony Orchestra under Leopold Stokowski. She later enrolled at Juilliard School, in 1975 becoming the first woman at Juilliard to earn the degree of doctor of musical arts in composition. Her teachers included John Boda, Elliott Carter, and Roger Sessions. She first came to prominence when Pierre Boulez programmed her Symposium for Orchestra with the Juilliard Symphony Orchestra in 1975.

Some of her work during this period was written for her husband, violinist Joseph Zwilich, who played in the orchestra of the Metropolitan Opera. He died in 1979, after which Taaffe Zwilich refocused her compositional efforts on "communicating more directly with performers and listeners," softening her somewhat harsh, jagged style.

Her Symphony No. 1 (Three Movements for Orchestra) was premiered by the American Composers Orchestra in 1982, conducted by Gunther Schuller. It won the 1983 Pulitzer Prize, after which her popularity and income from commissions ensured that she could devote herself to composing full-time. From 1995–99, she was the first occupant of the Composer's Chair at Carnegie Hall; while there, she created the "Making Music" concert series, which focuses on performances and lectures by living composers, a series that is still in existence.

She has received a number of other honors, including the Elizabeth Sprague Coolidge Chamber Music Prize, the Arturo Toscanini Music Critics Award, the Ernst von Dohnányi Citation, an Academy Award from the American Academy of Arts and Letters, a Guggenheim Foundation Fellowship, and four Grammy nominations. She was elected to the American Academy of Arts and Letters and the American Academy of Arts and Sciences, and in 1999, she was designated Musical America's Composer of the Year. She has been professor at Florida State University, and has served for many years on the advisory panel of the BMI Foundation, Inc. In 2009, she became the chair of the BMI Student Composer Awards following Milton Babbitt and William Schuman. She has received six honorary doctorates.

A 2012 recording of Taaffe Zwilich's Concerto for Clarinet and Chamber Orchestra, performed by Chamber Music Northwest with clarinetist David Shifrin, was selected by the Library of Congress in 2023 for preservation in the United States National Recording Registry for being "culturally, historically, or aesthetically significant."

== Compositional style ==
Taaffe Zwilich's compositional style is marked by an obsession with "the idea of generating an entire work – large-scale structure, melodic and harmonic language, and developmental processes – from its initial motives." In addition to large scale orchestral works like Symbolon (1988), Symphony No. 2 (Cello Symphony) (1985), and Symphony No. 3 (1992), she has written a number of notable, smaller-scale concertos. These include works for trombone (1988), bass trombone (1989), flute (1989), oboe (1990), bassoon (1992), horn (1993), trumpet (1994) and clarinet (2002). She has also written a small number of choral works and song cycles. Her music was conducted by Pierre Boulez at Juilliard in 1975. Her major breakthrough came after winning the 1983 Pulitzer Prize for her Symphony No. 1. Following this, she was commissioned to work on two more symphonies, for the San Francisco Symphony and for the New York Philharmonic's 150th anniversary. Symbolon has been performed in Europe, Asia, and America.

Ellen Taaffe's earliest works were exploratory, using techniques like serialism and the twelve-tone technique to find her own style. Zwilich's most noted composition, Symphony No. 1, was commissioned by the American Composers Orchestra and premiered in 1982 in Alice Tully Hall in New York. Zwilich notes that Symphony No. 1 was intended to start organically, using older techniques and one musical idea and growing into her own unique composition with modern techniques and unique embellishments.

For example, In Symphony No. 1, Zwilich used traditional principles such as pitch recurrence and explicitly established contrasting areas within her composition as a base to build her own unique composition. Zwilich's first movement is the most unique, using a "motto" to mark the contemplative mood, utilizing minor third ascensions and accelerandos to mark the individual phrases within the movement . As the first movement grows, the piece gradually gets more intense until it reaches the allegro section, where the movement slows its pace and ends in a similar way it began. As she moves into the second and third movements, the compositions follows a traditional symphony mold, with the second movement like a song form and the third movement in a rondo form.

As she continued to write, her compositions became more complex and unique, focusing on the emotionally expressive elements and more modern techniques. Similar to Symphony No. 1, Zwilich uses a "motto" to open her Symphony No. 2, but unlike her first symphony, this motto is layered with other unique mottos to shift the technique entirely. This original "motto" follows a specific rhythmic pattern with second and/or ninth intervals followed by their inversions, which would be noted later as part of an indicating technique in her unique style. The following movements mimic a lot of the techniques she previously used in her first Symphony, but as her style grows so do her compositions. Zwilich's composition for the orchestra is much more dramatic, highlighting an expanded percussion section and more emphasized dynamic contrasts throughout the piece to make the piece for more energetic and modern.

=== Symphonies ===
- Symphony No. 1 Three Movements for Orchestra (1982, Pulitzer Prize for Music, 1983)
- Symphony No. 2 Cello Symphony (1985)
- Symphony for Winds (1989)
- Symphony No. 3 (1992)
- Symphony No. 4 The Gardens for chorus, children's chorus and orchestra (1999, commissioned by Michigan State University)
- Symphony No. 5 Concerto for Orchestra (2008, commissioned by the Juilliard School; premiere October 27, 2008, Carnegie Hall, Juilliard Orchestra, James Conlon, conductor)

=== Other symphonic works ===
- Symposium (1973)
- Passages (1982)
- Prologue and Variations, for String orchestra (1983)
- Tanzspiel, ballet in four scenes (1983)
- Celebration for Orchestra (Overture) (1984)
- Concerto Grosso 1985 (in commemoration of the 300th anniversary of George Frideric Handel's birth)
- Symbolon (1988)
- Ceremonies for Concert Band (1988)
- Fantasy for orchestra (1993)
- Jubilation Overture (1996)
- Upbeat! (1998)
- Openings (2001)

=== Concertante works ===
- Piano Concerto (No. 1) (1986)
- Images (Suite in five movements) for two pianos and orchestra (1986)
- Trombone Concerto (1988)
- Concerto for bass trombone, strings, timpani and cymbals (1989)
- Flute Concerto (No. 1) (1989)
- Oboe Concerto (1990)
- Double Concerto for violin, cello and orchestra (1991)
- Bassoon Concerto (1992)
- Concerto for horn and string orchestra (1993)
- Romance for violin and chamber Orchestra (or for violin and piano) (1993)
- American Concerto for trumpet and orchestra (1994)
- Triple Concerto for piano, violin, cello and orchestra (1995)
- Peanuts Gallery, six pieces for piano and chamber orchestra (1996)
- Violin Concerto (No. 1) (1997)
- Millennium Fantasy (Piano Concerto No. 2) (2000; commissioned for Pianist Jeffrey Biegel, project featuring 27 orchestras in the USA; premiere with Cincinnati Symphony Orchestra, Jesus Lopez-Cobos conductor; recorded for Naxos with the Florida State University Orchestra, Alexander Jimenez conductor
- Partita (Violin Concerto No. 2) for violin and string orchestra (2000)
- Clarinet Concerto (2002)
- Rituals for five percussion players and orchestra (2003) (Invocation; Ambulation; Remembrances; Contests)
- Shadows (Piano Concerto No. 3) (2011; commissioned for pianist Jeffrey Biegel, 8 orchestras in the US, Canada and England; premiere with the Louisiana Philharmonic Orchestra, Carlos Miguel Prieto conductor; October 28/29, 2011)
- Commedia dell'Arte (Violin Concerto No. 3) for violin and string orchestra (2012)
- Concerto Elegia (Elegy, Soliloquy and Finale) for flute and string orchestra (2015)
- Pas de Trois (Piano Trio, 2016)
- Cello Concerto (2020)
- Saxophone Concerto for alto saxophone and wind ensemble (2022)
- Concerto for Viola and Orchestra (2025)

=== Chamber music ===
- Violin Sonata in Three Movements (1973–74)
- String Quartet No. 1 (1974)
- Clarinet Quintet (1977)
- Chamber Symphony for flute, clarinet, violin, viola, cello and piano (1979)
- Passages (1981)
- String Trio (1982)
- Divertimento for flute, clarinet, violin and cello (1983)
- Intrada (1983)
- Concerto for trumpet and five instruments (flute, clarinet, percussion, double bass and piano) (1984)
- Double Quartet for strings (1984)
- Piano Trio (1987)
- Clarinet Quintet (1990)
- Romance for violin and piano (or for violin and chamber orchestra) (1993)
- String Quartet No. 2 (1998)
- Lament for cello and piano (2000)
- Episodes for violin and piano (2003)
- Quartet for oboe and strings (2004)
- Quintet for alto saxophone and string quartet (2007)
- Episodes for soprano saxophone and piano (2007)
- Septet for piano trio and string quartet (2008)
- Quintet for violin, viola, cello, double bass and piano (2010)
- Voyage (String Quartet No. 3) (2012)
