= Egidyella =

Scientific classification
- Kingdom: Animalia
- Phylum: Arthropoda
- Class: Insecta
- Order: Coleoptera
- Suborder: Polyphaga
- Family: Dermestidae
- Tribe: Attagenini
- Genus: Egidyella; Reitter, 1899

Type species
- Egidyella prophetea Reitter, 1899

Genus of beetles

Egidyella is a genus of beetles in the family Dermestidae, containing the following species:

- Egidyella arcana Beal & Zhantiev, 2001 — California
- Egidyella prophetea Reitter, 1899 — Uzbekistan, Turkmenistan
