= Rob Cowan =

British radio presenter

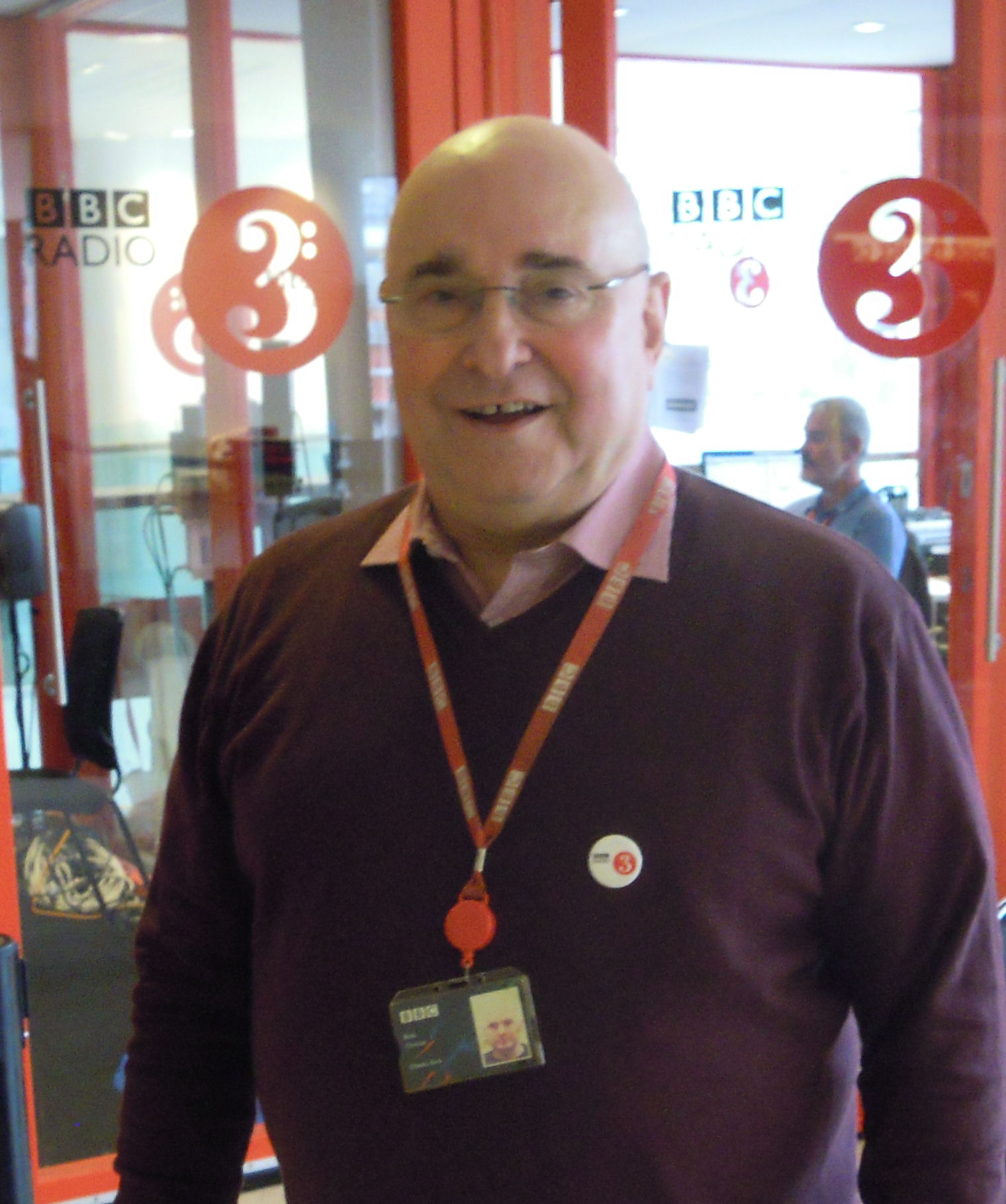
Rob Cowan at a BBC Radio 3 live event at the Southbank Centre in 2016

Rob Cowan (born 14 April 1948) is an English music broadcaster and writer.

Employed by music publisher Boosey & Hawkes for nineteen years in various capacities, his first record review was published in 1967. He edited CD Review for four years from 1985, and has also contributed reviews to Gramophone, Classic Record Collector and The Independent. He was a co-presenter with jazz and classical music writer Keith Shadwick on the Classic FM CD review programme. In September 1992, he was responsible for early radio plays of what became a best-selling recording (with soprano soloist Dawn Upshaw) of Henryk Górecki's Third Symphony.

After presenting CD Masters on Radio 3 for several years (the other host was Jonathan Swain), he had a spell as co-presenter of BBC Radio 3's Breakfast from 2007. He subsequently presented Radio 3's Essential Classics alongside Sarah Walker and Sunday Morning alongside James Jolly. He also appeared on Radio 3's CD Review.

In December 2017, he returned to Classic FM to present a Saturday evening programme. Cowan received a Grammy for his work on RCA's Heifetz Collection and is a member of the Royal Society of Musicians. He has been married to Georgie since 1971 and has two adult daughters, Francesca and Victoria, and a granddaughter Elizabeth.
