= Piano Concerto (Zwilich) =

The Concerto for Piano and Orchestra is a composition for solo piano and orchestra by the American composer Ellen Taaffe Zwilich. The work was written on a commission from Carnegie Hall, the Detroit Symphony Orchestra, and the League of American Orchestras. It was the first composition ever commissioned by either Carnegie Hall or the League of American Orchestras. The world premiere was performed by the pianist Marc-André Hamelin and the Detroit Symphony Orchestra under the direction of Günther Herbig at the Meadow Brook Music Festival in Rochester Hills, Michigan, on June 26, 1986. The piece is dedicated to Günther Herbig.

== Composition ==
The Piano Concerto has a performance duration of roughly 24 minutes and is cast in three movements:

1. Lento–Allegro
2. Andante misterioso
3. Allegro con brio

=== Instrumentation ===
The work is scored for solo piano and a large orchestra comprising piccolo, two flutes, two oboes, English horn, two clarinets, bass clarinet, two bassoons, contrabassoon, four horns, three trumpets, three trombones, tuba, timpani, percussion, and strings.

== Reception ==
Reviewing the East Coast premiere at Carnegie Hall, John Rockwell of The New York Times wrote, "This Piano Concerto, which received its first performance last year at Meadow Brook near Detroit and which lasted 23 minutes on Friday, consists of two relatively brief outer movements flanking a longer Andante misterioso. There is a good deal of exposed writing for the piano, but the most striking moments of this piece come in the slow movement, which aspires to real grandeur and, here and there, attains it. By comparison, the quicker movements sounded more perfunctory." Reviewing a recording of the work by the pianist Joseph Kalichstein and the Florida State University Orchestra conducted by Michael Stern, John Fleming of the Tampa Bay Times praised the "wonderfully eclectic range of musical styles" in Zwilich's work, particularly "the jazz in sections of the Piano Concerto."
