= Lanorus mcdonaldi =

Scientific classification
- Domain: Eukaryota
- Kingdom: Animalia
- Phylum: Arthropoda
- Class: Insecta
- Order: Coleoptera
- Suborder: Polyphaga
- Family: Dermestidae
- Genus: Lanorus
- Species: L. mcdonaldi

Binomial name
- Lanorus mcdonaldi (Herrmann & Háva, 2021)

Synonyms
- Paranovelsis mcdonaldi Herrmann & Háva, 2021

Species of beetle

Lanorus mcdonaldi is a species of carpet beetle in the family Dermestidae. It has only been found in California, United States.
