= Symbolon =

Composition for orchestra

- Orchestral music by Ellen Taaffe Zwilich
- Composed: 1988
- Dedication: Zubin Mehta

Premiere
- Date: June 1, 1988
- Location: Leningrad
- Conductor: Zubin Mehta
- Performers: New York Philharmonic

Symbolon is a composition for orchestra written by the American composer Ellen Taaffe Zwilich. The piece was commissioned by the New York Philharmonic for their 1988 tour of the Soviet Union and was completed on January 8, 1988. It is dedicated to Zubin Mehta, who conducted the work's premiere by the New York Philharmonic in Leningrad on June 1, 1988. It was the first piece of American orchestral music to be premiered in the Soviet Union.

== Composition ==
Symbolon is cast in a single movement and has a performance duration of approximately 16 minutes. The title comes from the Greek word for symbol, which, the composer wrote, "refers to the ancient custom whereby two parties broke a piece of pottery (or a stone, or a coin) in two, each party retaining half. Each half (or 'symbolon') thus became a token of friendship as well as proof of identity of the bearer." She added:

While Symbolon is not a programmatic or narrative work, I am certain that it was inspired by its circumstances. From the beginning I knew that the piece would receive its first performance in the Soviet Union, and I found this profoundly moving. I am sure that my complex feelings, embracing both hope and sadness about the state of the political world, have found their way into this work.

=== Instrumentation ===
The music is written for a large orchestra consisting of three flutes, three oboes, four clarinets, three bassoons, four horns, three trumpets, three trombones, tuba, timpani, percussion, harp, and strings.

== Reception ==
Symbolon has been generally praised by music critics. Reviewing the United States premiere in New York City, Donal Henahan of The New York Times wrote, "The 15-minute score, which had its world premiere in Leningrad under Mr. Mehta during the Philharmonic's recent tour of the Soviet Union, is a true creature of its century, often glancing at Bartok, Strauss and Stravinsky (whose ostinatos haunt it). This is a forceful, listenable piece, with rich, transparently orchestrated sonorities that occasionally suggest such recent composers as Messiaen or Carter." Bill Zekariasen of the New York Daily News similarly remarked:

The word symbolon is basically a Greek term meaning token of friendship, and no doubt glasnost was on Zwilich's mind when she wrote this 16-minute tone poem. There's a good deal of conflict in its opening pages intriguingly, Shostakovich is invoked in counterpoint to typical American sounds. Gradually, optimism takes over, and the work ends in heartwarming conciliation. Though Zwilich uses an elaborate orchestral lineup, the instrumentation is at all times transparent and never oppressive. On one hearing, Symbolon made a positive impression.

Reviewing a 1998 performance by the Pittsburgh Symphony Orchestra, Robert Croan of the Pittsburgh Post-Gazette observed:

It works very well as absolute music, filled with emotion of a less specific nature and structural logic that carries itself in the ear. It's mostly vigorous (with lyrical episodes emphasizing soloistic coloration) and quite varied within its 16-minute duration. It left me wanting to hear it again not immediately, but perhaps a few weeks hence, to further absorb its beauties.
