= Symphony No. 1 (Zwilich) =

Symphony No. 1 (Three Movements for Orchestra) (1982) is the first symphony by Ellen Taaffe Zwilich (b. 1939). Premiered May 5, 1982, by the American Composers Orchestra conducted by Gunther Schuller at Alice Tully Hall and commissioned by the American Composers Orchestra and the National Endowment for the Arts with the support of the Guggenheim Foundation, it was awarded the Pulitzer Prize for Music in 1983, making her the first female composer to win the prize.

The symphony is built around a tonal axis on A and uses a technique common to many of Zwilich's compositions where the large scale work is elaborated from the initial material, "the fashioning of a musical idea that contains the 'seeds' of the work to follow," along with continuous variation and, "older...principles, such as melodic and pitch recurrence and clearly defined areas of contrast."

The entire three movements use continuous development of the material of the opening fifteen measures, which begin, "with a 'motto': three statements of a rising minor third, marked accelerando."

1. Allegro
2. Song form
3. Rondo

== Discography ==
- (December 8, 1992) Zwilich: Symphony No. 1, Prologue & Variations, and Celebration for Orchestra. Indianapolis Symphony Orchestra, John Nelson, conductor. New World Records: NW336-2.
