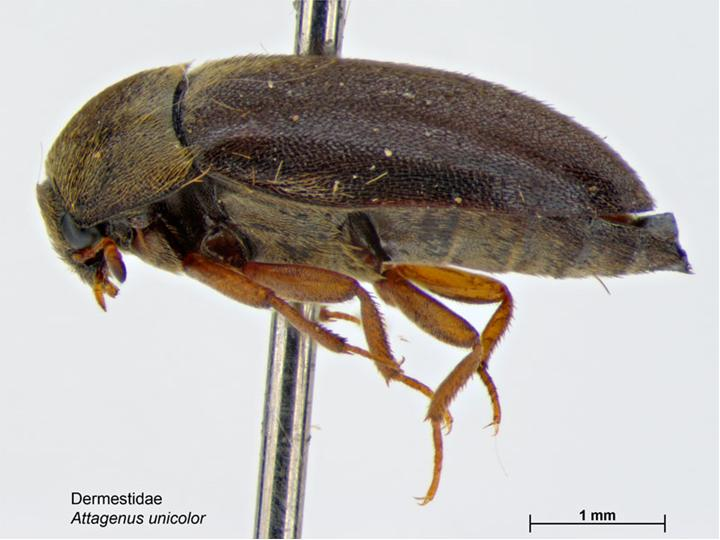
- Adult beetle
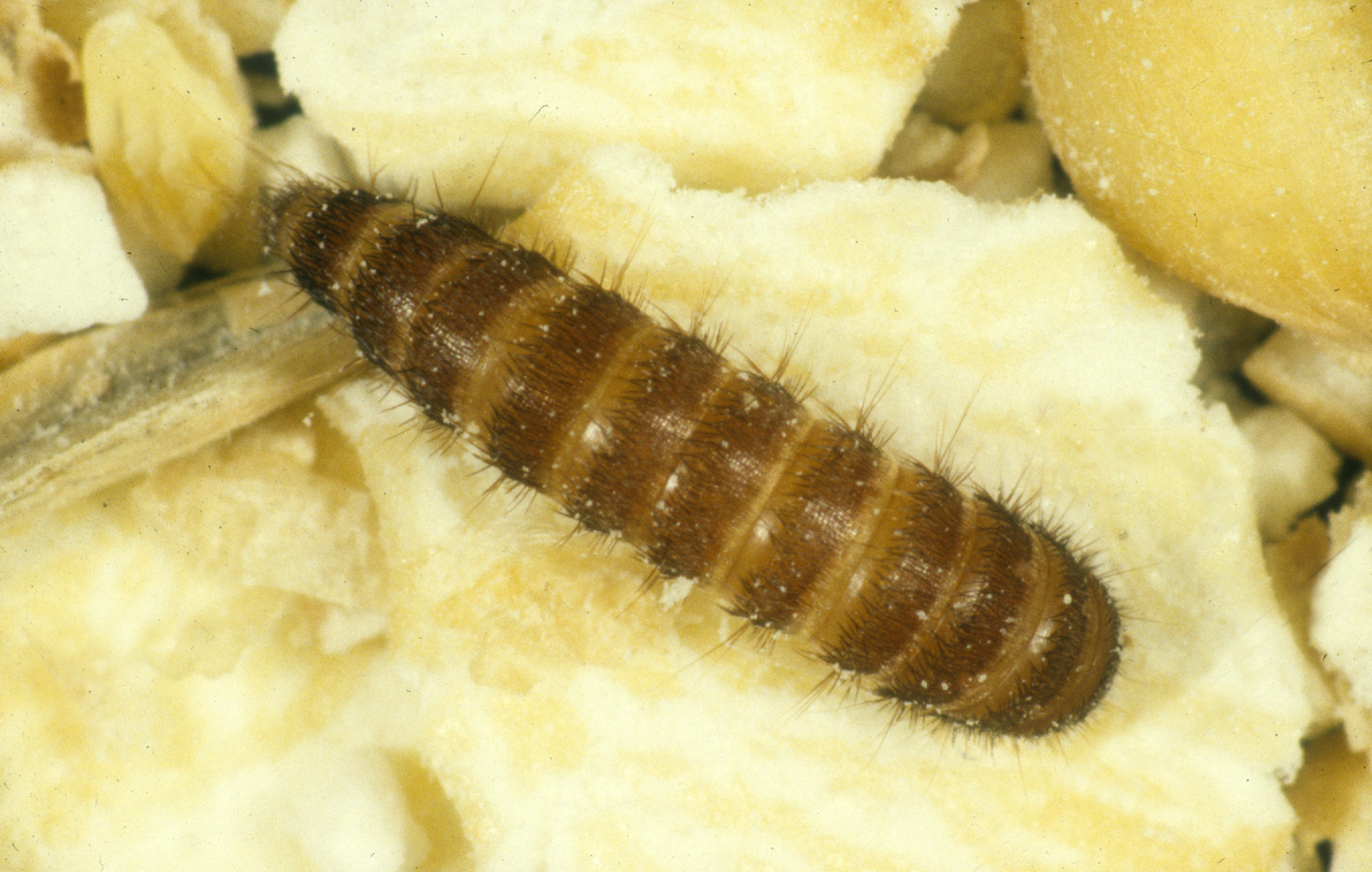
- Larva

Scientific classification
- Kingdom: Animalia
- Phylum: Arthropoda
- Clade: Pancrustacea
- Class: Insecta
- Order: Coleoptera
- Suborder: Polyphaga
- Family: Dermestidae
- Genus: Attagenus
- Species: A. unicolor

Binomial name
- Attagenus unicolor (Brahm, 1791)

Synonyms
- Attagenus megatoma (Fabricius, 1798); Attagenus piceus (Olivier, 1790); Dermestes cilindricornis Melsheimer, 1806; Dermestes megatoma Fabricius, 1798; Dermestes piceus Olivier, 1790; Dermestes unicolor Brahm, 1790

= Black carpet beetle =

Species of beetle

The black carpet beetle (Attagenus unicolor) is a 3–5-millimetre-long (0.12–0.20 in) beetle that can be a serious household pest. The larvae grow to 7 mm (0.28 in) in length, are reddish brown in colour and covered with bristles. The larval form feeds on natural fibres, damaging carpets, furniture and clothing.

== Life cycle ==
Attagenus unicolor undergoes complete metamorphosis, which has four life stages: Egg, larvae, pupae and adult. Each stage looks different, and needs different amounts of time to reach the next stage.

Eggs are usually laid near or on a food source. If no food source can be found, the female will lay them in dark undisturbed locations where the larvae can feed on carpeting or clothing. They will also lay eggs on or near dog food or other pet food. Eggs take anywhere from 5 to 20 days to hatch depending on the conditions, such as temperature and humidity.

Larvae are about 1 mm (0.039 in) in size when they hatch from the egg. They grow fairly quickly depending on the food source availability and protein found in the food itself. Larvae moult about 10 to 15 times, or more depending on conditions. Sometimes if food is scarce they will retro-moult with the larvae moulting into a lower instar. They can do this multiple times, if they are large enough.

The larval stage is the longest and most destructive stage; they can remain as larvae for up to 3 years, although it does not typically take longer than 3 months to go through the larval stage if food and conditions are good. Larvae pupate in undisturbed locations, far away from the food source so that they aren't cannibalized.

Pupae are cream white but quickly turn yellow and darken with age. They do not eat in this stage nor move. They transform into the beetles in about 8 to 20 days, depending on the conditions. The beetle may stay in the shedded pupae case for an additional day or two.

Beetles start out white but darken with age. They typically do not eat, although they will sometimes eat flower pollen in the wild, but not indoors. Adults live for a few weeks, just long enough to mate and lay more eggs. They are eventually black in colour, hence the name Black Carpet Beetle. Females are capable of laying 50 to 100 eggs.

The whole life cycle under ideal conditions takes about 4 to 5 months, or less if given protein-rich food, such as pet food. The adult females will lay more eggs if water is present in small amounts.

== See also ==
- Varied carpet beetle

Commonly confused with species:

- Attagenus schaefferi
- Attagenus brunneus
