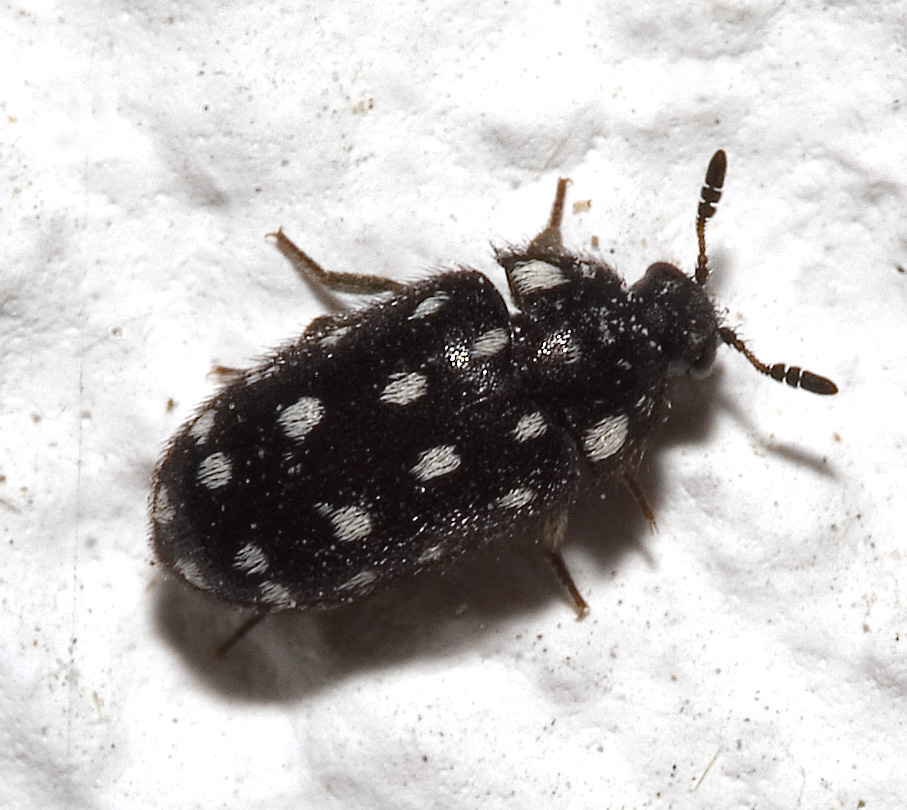

Scientific classification
- Domain: Eukaryota
- Kingdom: Animalia
- Phylum: Arthropoda
- Class: Insecta
- Order: Coleoptera
- Suborder: Polyphaga
- Family: Dermestidae
- Genus: Lanorus
- Species: L. punctatus

Binomial name
- Lanorus punctatus (Scopoli, 1772)

Synonyms
- Dermestes punctatus Scopoli, 1772; Attagenus punctatus (Scopoli, 1772); Dermestes vigintiguttatus Fabricius, 1775; Dermestes quadripunctatus Fuesslin, 1775; Dermestes multiguttatus Schrank, 1798; Megatoma vigintipunctatum Christofori & Jan, 1832; Attagenus vigintipunctatus Haberfelner, 1889; Lanorus vigintiguttatus Coucke, 1892; Attagenus punctatus Reitter, 1906; Paranovelsis punctatus (Scopoli, 1772)

= Lanorus punctatus =

Species of beetle

Lanorus punctatus (previously known under genera names Attagenus and Paranovelsis) is a species of beetle found in Europe and the Near East. In Europe, it is known from Austria, mainland France, Germany, Hungary, mainland Italy, Slovakia, Bosnia and Herzegovina, Croatia, Montenegro, North Macedonia, Serbia, and Slovenia.
