= Clarinet Concerto (Zwilich) =

Musical composition by Ellen Taaffe Zwilich

The Clarinet Concerto is a composition for solo clarinet and orchestra by the American composer Ellen Taaffe Zwilich. It was commissioned by the Arlene and Dr. Milton D. Berkman Philanthropic Fund for the clarinetist David Shifrin, to whom the piece is dedicated. The concerto was first performed by Shifrin and twelve members of the Chamber Music Society of Lincoln Center in Alice Tully Hall on September 12, 2003.

== Composition ==
In fall 2001, Zwilich had already sketched the first movements of her Clarinet Concerto and was about to begin work on the second movement when news of the September 11 attacks broke. The composer subsequently decided to transform the second movement into an elegy for that day titled "Elegy: September 11." The concerto has a performance duration of approximately 28 minutes and is cast in four—all, except the second, untitled—movements.

=== Instrumentation ===
The work is scored for solo clarinet and a small orchestra consisting of flute, oboe, bassoon, two horns, cornet, percussion, and strings.

== Reception ==
Peter G. Davis of New York wrote, "Ellen Taaffe Zwilich's 'Clarinet Concerto' would surely have turned out to be quite a different piece had not the fatal date arrived just as she was about to start work on the second movement." He added, "It's all done with the most skillful application and development of its musical materials – a score truly inspired by a tragic event and one that is likely to transcend it."

In 2023, a 2012 recording of the concerto by Chamber Music Northwest with clarinetist David Shifrin was selected by the Library of Congress for preservation in the United States National Recording Registry as being "culturally, historically, or aesthetically significant."
