= Cello Concerto (Zwilich) =

The Concerto for Cello and Orchestra is a composition for solo cello and orchestra by the American composer Ellen Taaffe Zwilich. The work was written on a commission from the South Florida Symphony Orchestra. Zwilich composed the piece over a six-month period, completing the work in early 2020. It was given its world premiere by the cellist Zuill Bailey the South Florida Symphony Orchestra conducted by Sebrina María Alfonso on March 5, 2020, at the Broward Center for the Performing Arts in Fort Lauderdale, Florida. The concerto is dedicated to Zuill Bailey and Sebrina María Alfonso and written in memory of the cellists Leonard Rose and Mstislav Rostropovich.

== Composition ==
The Cello Concerto has a duration of approximately 19 minutes and is cast in three connected movements.

=== Instrumentation ===
The work is scored for solo cello and an orchestra comprising flute, oboe, English horn, clarinet, bass clarinet, two bassoons, two horns, two trumpets, and strings.

== Reception ==
Reviewing the world premiere, Lawrence Budmen of the South Florida Classical Review enthusiastically wrote, "Zwilich rarely repeats a melody exactly the same way. Constant changes of orchestration and thematic paths abound as each new episode grips the listener. Orchestral incidents are replete with instrumental color and surprise, as when plucked strings underpin the cello's angular fragments. Zwilich's new work [...] is an important addition to the cello concerto literature." Dennis D. Rooney of the Palm Beach Arts Paper similarly remarked, "The concerto's three linked movements suggested a meditation on melodic gestures from the American vernacular. The blues hovered over the work allusively, but the musical materials always generated multifaceted meanings that were compelling yet evanescent, ranging from gently introspective to aggressive. An agitated, bustling motto introduced the successive sections. Throughout, the mood was thoughtful but not elegiac."
