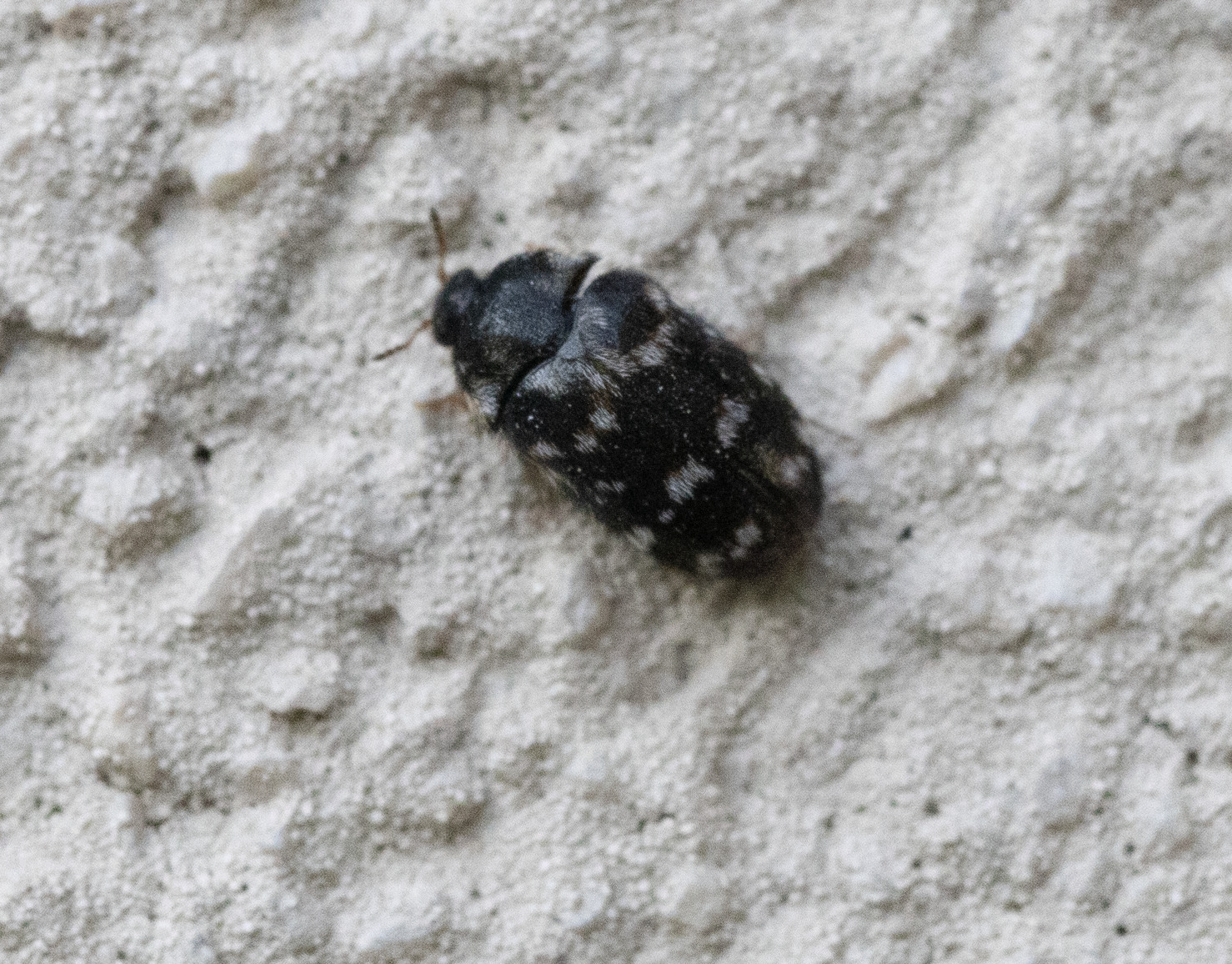

Scientific classification
- Kingdom: Animalia
- Phylum: Arthropoda
- Clade: Pancrustacea
- Class: Insecta
- Order: Coleoptera
- Suborder: Polyphaga
- Family: Dermestidae
- Genus: Lanorus
- Species: L. aequalis

Binomial name
- Lanorus aequalis (Sharp, 1902)

= Lanorus aequalis =

Species of beetle

Lanorus aequalis is a species of beetle in the family Dermestidae.

The species ranges from the northeastern United States to Oklahoma and Texas.
