= Symphony No. 2 (Zwilich) =

Composition by Ellen Taaffe Zwilich

The Symphony No. 2, or Cello Symphony is a composition for orchestra by the American composer Ellen Taaffe Zwilich. The work was composed in 1985 on a commission from the San Francisco Symphony. It was first performed on November 13, 1985, by the San Francisco Symphony under the direction of Edo de Waart, to whom the piece is dedicated.

== Composition ==
=== Background ===
Zwilich conceived her Symphony No. 2 to "exploit the artistry and virtuosity" of the cello section of a modern symphony orchestra. In the score program note, the composer wrote, "To me, the cello is the quintessential singer among string instruments, encompassing, as it does, the entire human vocal range from the lowest bass voice to the highest soprano. Another aspect of the cello that fascinates me is the enormous range of expression, so I wanted to explore a wide gamut of techniques and dramatic moods. Additionally I find the sound of multiple cellos thrilling. For these reasons, I decided that I would combine concepts of symphonic development with a concerto attitude." She continued, "The work bears the subtitle Cello Symphony because it is a symphony in which the cello section is the protagonist. In fact, the piece is virtually a concerto for the cello section, calling for highly virtuosic playing and exploring the full range and scope of the instrument. The first movement even has a cadenza for the cello section!"

=== Structure ===
The symphony has a performance duration of roughly 24 minutes and is cast in three movements in the traditional fast-slow-fast concerto form:

1. Allegro
2. Lento
3. Presto

=== Instrumentation ===
The work is scored for a large orchestra consisting of three flutes, three oboes, three clarinets, three bassoons, four horns, three trumpets, three trombones, tuba, timpani, percussion, piano, and strings.

== Reception ==
Reviewing the world premiere, Michael Walsh of Time wrote, "Zwilich's new symphony is a 24-minute, three-movement, fast-slow-fast essay that daringly transforms the cello section into a collective soloist, a throaty protagonist locked in combat with the rest of the orchestra. Hard driving and explosive, the piece erupts from a single rhythmic idea that propels the music forward relentlessly. Even the moody slow movement cannot dilute the restless surge, which continues undaunted right to the final bar."
