= Chamber Symphony (Zwilich) =

The Chamber Symphony is a symphony for chamber ensemble by the American composer Ellen Taaffe Zwilich. It was commissioned by the music ensemble Boston Musica Viva, which first performed the work under the direction of Richard Pittman on November 30, 1979. The work is cast in a single movement and has a duration of approximately 17 minutes in performance.

== Composition ==
=== Background ===
Zwilich was in the process of composing the Chamber Symphony in 1979 when her husband, the violinist Joseph Zwilich, died suddenly of a massive heart attack while attending a performance at the Metropolitan Opera House. In a 1985 interview with the music critic Tim Page, the composer reflected, "It's still very difficult for me to listen to the 'Chamber Symphony.' I had begun writing it before Joe died, and when I came back to complete it, everything had changed. It was a crucible of sorts. I loved Joe very dearly, and miss him to this day, yet his death taught me nothing so much as the joy of being alive—the joy of breathing, walking, feeling well, swimming, the joy of being human. Suddenly all talk of method and style seemed trivial; I became interested in meaning. I wanted to say something, musically, about life and living."

In a 2011 interview with Frank J. Oteri, she further remarked:

I was pretty much unable to do anything for a number of weeks. And when I went back to it, I was such a different person, I had to start all over. And I think that in the course of that, I found how deep music was inside of me. And what it meant to me. One of my good friends came with me to Boston for the premiere, and when they got to the end of the piece, she turned to me and she said, "I hear acceptance in your music. And I haven’t heard a peep out of you that accepted any of this." And she was absolutely right. I mean, my music was ahead of me in terms of my psyche. I do think it made me appreciate more the values that I was talking about earlier, the soulful values, the kinesthetic values of music. And it made me appreciate that kind of thing much more.

=== Instrumentation ===
The piece is scored for a chamber ensemble consisting of flute doubling piccolo, clarinet doubling bass clarinet, violin, viola, cello, and piano.

== Reception ==
Critical response to the Chamber Symphony has been mostly positive. Reviewing a 1983 performance of the piece, Joseph McLellan of The Washington Post described it as "a succinct, intense work that develops an orchestral richness of sound with piano, three strings, flute, and clarinet. Composed after her husband's sudden death, the music has a deep, direct emotional appeal, reflecting the anguish of that time." Edward Rothstein of The New York Times remarked, "Simple musical elements expressionistically touched on grief, outrage, bewilderment. The music soon fell prey to its sentiment without profoundly exploring it, but the effort was not without interest."
