= Classical Recordings Quarterly =

Classical music magazine

Classical Recordings Quarterly (formerly Classic Record Collector) was a quarterly British magazine devoted to vintage recordings of classical music, across the range of instrumental recordings, chamber music, orchestral, vocal and opera.

== Background ==
Based in London, the magazine was founded (as International Classical Record Collector) in 1995. The magazine contains articles about artists and their recordings from the start of recording history through to the 1960s. There is also a letters page, reviews of new DVD and CD issues of pre-digital material, new LP and 78 rpm repressings and books. The International Opera Collector was another quarterly supplement published at the same time.

== Content ==
Extended articles on the Kingsway Hall and on William Barrington-Coupe's record labels appeared, as well as features on a wide range of artists such as Louis Cahuzac, Tancredi Pasero, Montserrat Caballé, the Ballets Russes, the Griller Quartet, Albert Spalding and Oskar Fried, as well as many others.

Alan Sanders served as editor for the first two years from 1995 to 1997, after which Tully Potter was editor until 2008 (when he became Contributing editor), when Sanders returned to edit the magazine.

== Contributors ==
Classical Recordings Quarterly employed a network of reviewers mainly from the UK and the USA, along with regular columns by Shuichiro Kawai (Japan) 'Far Eastern Viewpoint', Norbert Hornig (Germany) 'Continental Report', and a 'Letter from America' by Mortimer H Frank. Contributors to the magazine, both past and present, include Kenneth Morgan, Duncan Druce, Max Loppert, Benjamin Ivry, John T Hughes, Igor Kipnis, Colin Anderson, Michael Oliver, Rob Cowan, Robert Matthew-Walker, David Patmore, Antony Hodgson and J.B. Steane, among many others.

The magazine was printed in A5 size, with colour photos, and each edition consists of around 100 pages.

== Closure ==
Classical Recordings Quarterly ceased publication in 2015. A series of reissued rare recordings, Classical Recordings Quarterly editions, still exists.
