= William James Beal =

American botanist (1833–1924)

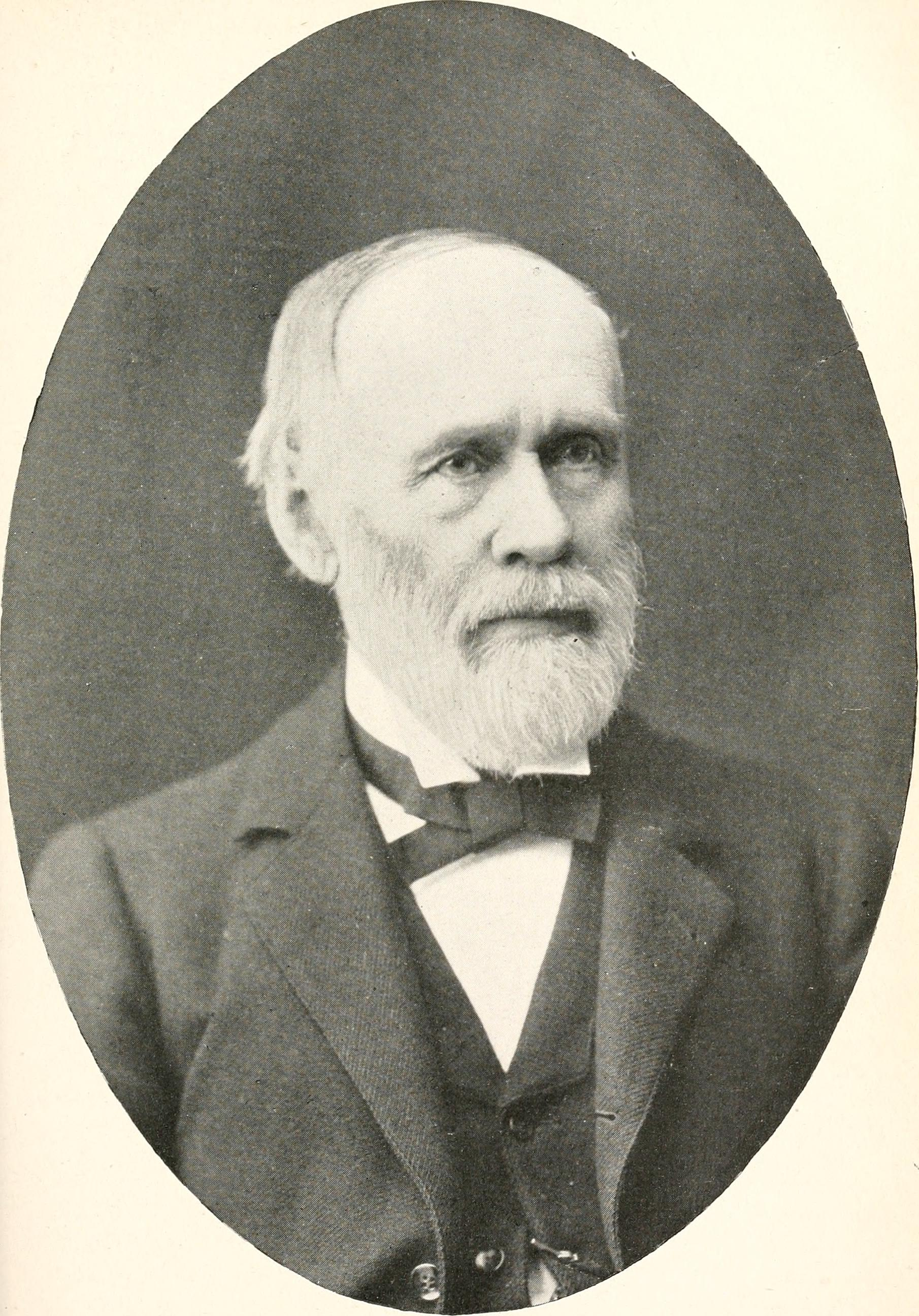
- Born: March 11, 1833; Adrian, Michigan, U.S.
- Died: May 12, 1924 (aged 91); Amherst, Massachusetts, U.S.
- Resting place: Mount Hope Cemetery; Lansing, Michigan, U.S.
- Education: University of Michigan; Harvard University; University of Chicago
- Known for: Pioneer in the development of hybrid corn Founder of W. J. Beal Botanical Garden
- Spouse: Hannah Proud Beal
- Scientific career
- Fields: Botanist
- Workplaces: University of Chicago; Michigan State University
- Author abbrev. (botany): Beal

William James Beal (March 11, 1833 – May 12, 1924) was an American botanist. He was a pioneer in the development of hybrid corn and the founder of the W. J. Beal Botanical Garden.

== Biography ==
Beal was born in Adrian, Michigan, to William and Rachel (Comstock) Beal, His parents were pioneering Quaker settlers/farmers from New York state. Beal grew up in forested land surrounded by native plant and animal life. He married Hannah Proud in 1863. He retired to Amherst, Massachusetts, and died there in 1924.

== Education ==
He attended the University of Michigan, where he earned an A.B. degree in 1859 and an A.M. degree biology in 1862; he also received an S.B. in botany degree from Harvard University, 1865, an M.S. degree in biology from the University of Chicago, 1875, and a number of honorary degrees.

Between 1858 and 1861 he was a teacher of Natural Sciences at Friends Academy at Union Springs, New York.

== Research at the Michigan Agricultural College ==
Comparison of corns

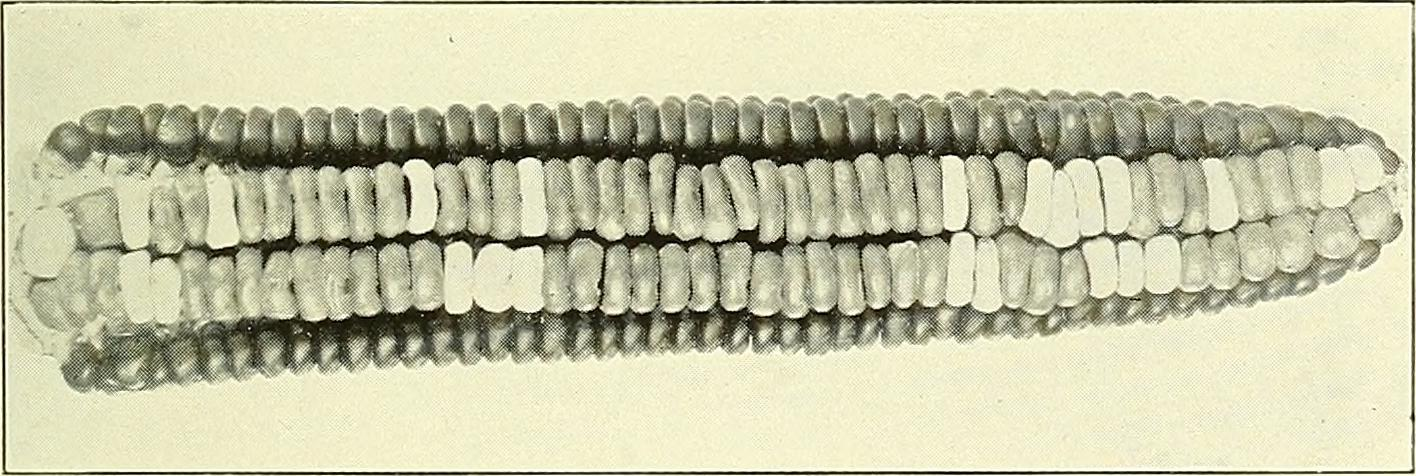
8 rowed corn

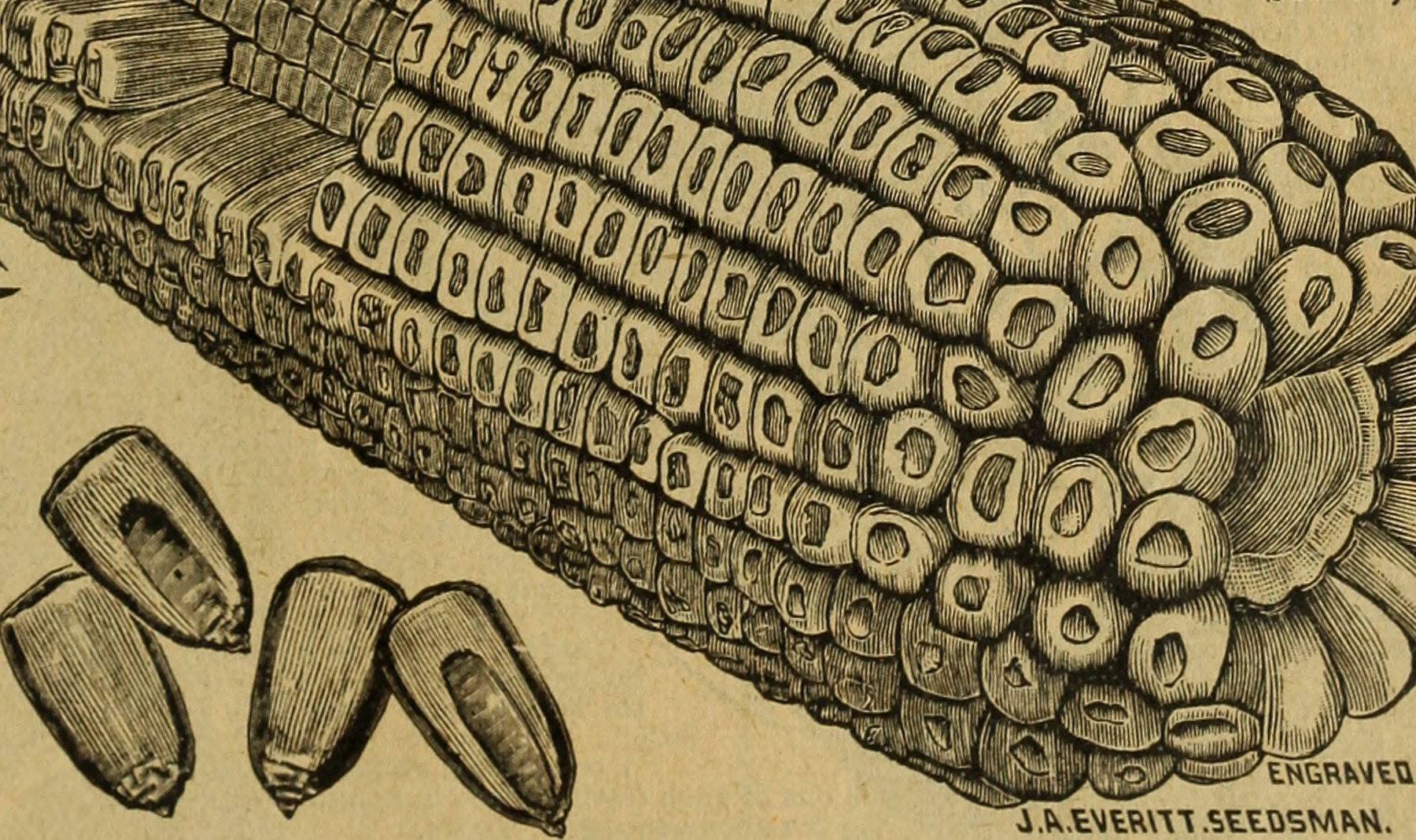
16-24 rowed corn

After briefly serving as professor of botany at the University of Chicago in 1868–70, Beal went on to Michigan Agricultural College (MAC, now Michigan State University), where he was professor of botany (1871–1910) and curator of the botanical museum (1882–1905). During his tenure he also served as professor of horticulture (1872–1882) and professor of forestry (1882–1902). While at MAC, he arranged for Liberty Hyde Bailey to work as an assistant to Asa Gray at Harvard University for two years during 1883–1884. He also served as co-director of the state Forestry Commission (1889–1892). He was a key leader of the experimental movement of agricultural botany at the college.

His research at the MAC involved using cross-fertilization to increase the yield from 8 rowed Indian corn to 24 rowed hybrid corn. His contributions planted him as “one of the pioneers in the development of hybrid corn” in the late 19th century. Using his techniques, Beal was able to produce crops that bloomed earlier, were hardier, had more vigor, and had “better qualities” than traditionally grown varieties. He began conducting these experiments in 1878. He also conducted the first turfgrass experiments at the college in 1880.

Beal first visited the Michigan Agricultural College in 1870. He was to teach a botany class during the summer. At that time, Lansing had a population of 1,541 residents and the addition of a new hall on campus allowed the college to accept 150 students, up from the previous 82 student accommodation. He described the college as “young, poor, and small”. Due to a lack of faculty, Beal taught a wide range of subjects. In addition to teaching his passion of botany, he also taught English, history, and civil engineering. His successor at the Michigan Agricultural College, P.G. Holden, is quoted as praising Beal’s work by saying “From his original experiment has come to the Twentieth Century Miracle - hybrid corn.”

Beal founded MSU's W. J. Beal Botanical Garden in 1877, making it the oldest continuously operated botanical garden in the United States.

As curator of the botanical museum, Beal expanded the collection substantially. He added 2000 of his own specimens when he was first appointed to the existing herbarium of around 20,000 specimens. When he retired in 1910, the herbarium contained 106,000 accessioned specimens, the majority therefore acquired by collection, purchase or exchange during his tenure. These included fungi as well as green plants. The vascular plant collection was renamed the Beal-Darlington Herbarium in the mid-1950s.

Beal's work was inspired by many influential scientists of the late 19th century. He arrived at Harvard to complete an undergraduate degree 3 years after Charles Darwin published The Origin of Species. Emerson, Lowell, and Holmes were writing and lecturing, and Thoreau was still alive. Beal heard them all as a young student from Michigan. Groundbreaking research by Darwin and the writings of Emerson, Lowell, Holmes, and Thoreau were probably inspirations to a young Beal as he transitioned from studying at Harvard to conducting his research at the Michigan Agricultural College. Darwin’s research on inheritance especially seems to have influenced Beal’s development of hybrid corn.

In 1887, he and Professor Rolla C. Carpenter created "Collegeville", the first neighborhood in what later became East Lansing.

== Germination experiment ==
In 1879 Beal started one of the longest-running experiments in botany. He filled 20 bottles with a mixture of sand and seeds, with each bottle containing 50 seeds from 21 species of plant. Then the bottles were buried, their necks pointing down to exclude water. The goal of the experiment was to unearth one of the bottles every five years, plant the seeds, and observe the number that would sprout. Later caretakers extended the experiment by opening a bottle once every decade, and later, every two decades.

A bottle was unearthed in 2000, and 2 of the 21 plant species sprouted.

The experiment is still running, with the bottles buried on the campus of Michigan State University. The end of the study is due in 2100.

The latest test occurred in 2021, after a delay caused by the COVID-19 pandemic.

== Published works ==
He was the author of The New Botany (1882), Grasses of North America (1887), Seed Dispersal (1898) and History of Michigan Agricultural College (1915).

== Quotation ==
"Merely learning the name of a plant or parts of a plant can no longer be palmed off as valuable training."

As published in The Examiner of Hartford, Conn, on Dec 3, 1881: "If you have money to fool away, seed down your young orchard to clover and timothy, or sow a crop of wheat or oats. If you want the trees to thrive, cultivate well till they are seven or ten years old. Spread ashes, manue, or salt broadcast. Stop cultivating in August, weeds or no weeds; this allows the trees to ripen for winter. The question whether to cultivate old orchards or not must be answered by observing the trees. If the clover of the leaves is good and they grow well and bear fine fruit they are doing well enough even if in grass. But if the leaves are pale, the annual growth less than a foot on a twelve trees, and the fruit small and poor, something is the matter, and they are suffering for want of cultivation, or manure, or both. To judge of the condition of an apple is like judging of the condition of sheep in a pasture. Look at the sheep, and if they are plump and fat, they are all right."

== Death ==
Beal was buried at Mount Hope Cemetery in Lansing.

== See also ==
- Long-term experiment
