= Symphony No. 3 (Zwilich) =

The Symphony No. 3 is a symphony for orchestra by the American composer Ellen Taaffe Zwilich. The work was commissioned by the New York Philharmonic to commemorate their sesquicentennial anniversary. It was first performed by the New York Philharmonic conducted by Jahja Ling on February 25, 1993. The symphony is dedicated "with love and admiration" to Kurt Masur and the New York Philharmonic.

== Composition ==
The symphony has a duration of approximately 22 minutes in performance and is cast in three movements:

1. Maestoso e cantabile – Allegro giocoso
2. Molto vivace
3. Largo

The second and third movements are played without pause.

The work is scored for a large orchestra consisting of piccolo, two flutes, two oboes, cor anglais, two clarinets, bass clarinet, two bassoons, contrabassoon, four horns, three trumpets, three trombones, tuba, timpani, percussion, and strings.

== Reception ==
Reviewing the world premiere, Bernard Holland of The New York Times wrote, "What Ms. Zwilich does she does with great skill and sincerity. The contrapuntal interplay is sure and effective, although at the end I don't think that altitude, pressure and repetition are quite enough to create the substance and weight she is after." Reviewing a later performance by the Philadelphia Orchestra, Judith White of The Saratogian wrote, "The music makes the audience sit up and listen, as the instruments from various sections achieve difficult unisons and staggered harmonies." Lawrence A. Johnson of the Sun-Sentinel opined, "It's outrageous that music of the Miami-born Ellen Taaffe Zwilich continues to be so neglected, not least in her home state. The Pulitzer Prize winner's Third Symphony is among her finest works, concise and deeply felt, with a powerful Largo finale."

European reviewers were more critical of the work, however. Michael Oliver of Gramophone wrote, "The Third Symphony contains plenty of good ideas: a sombre and long-spanned viola melody that acts as 'first subject' in the opening movement; the malign march that propels the central scherzo. But I really cannot feel that the symphony would be much harmed if its movements were played in reverse order, or if the outer ones in particular were to be cut by about three minutes apiece." Annette Morreau of BBC Music Magazine dismissed the piece as "sentimentality without guts," adding, "Her bland music is perfect for America's numerous colleges – where it should remain."
