= W. J. Beal Botanical Garden =

Botanical garden in East Lansing, Michigan, United States

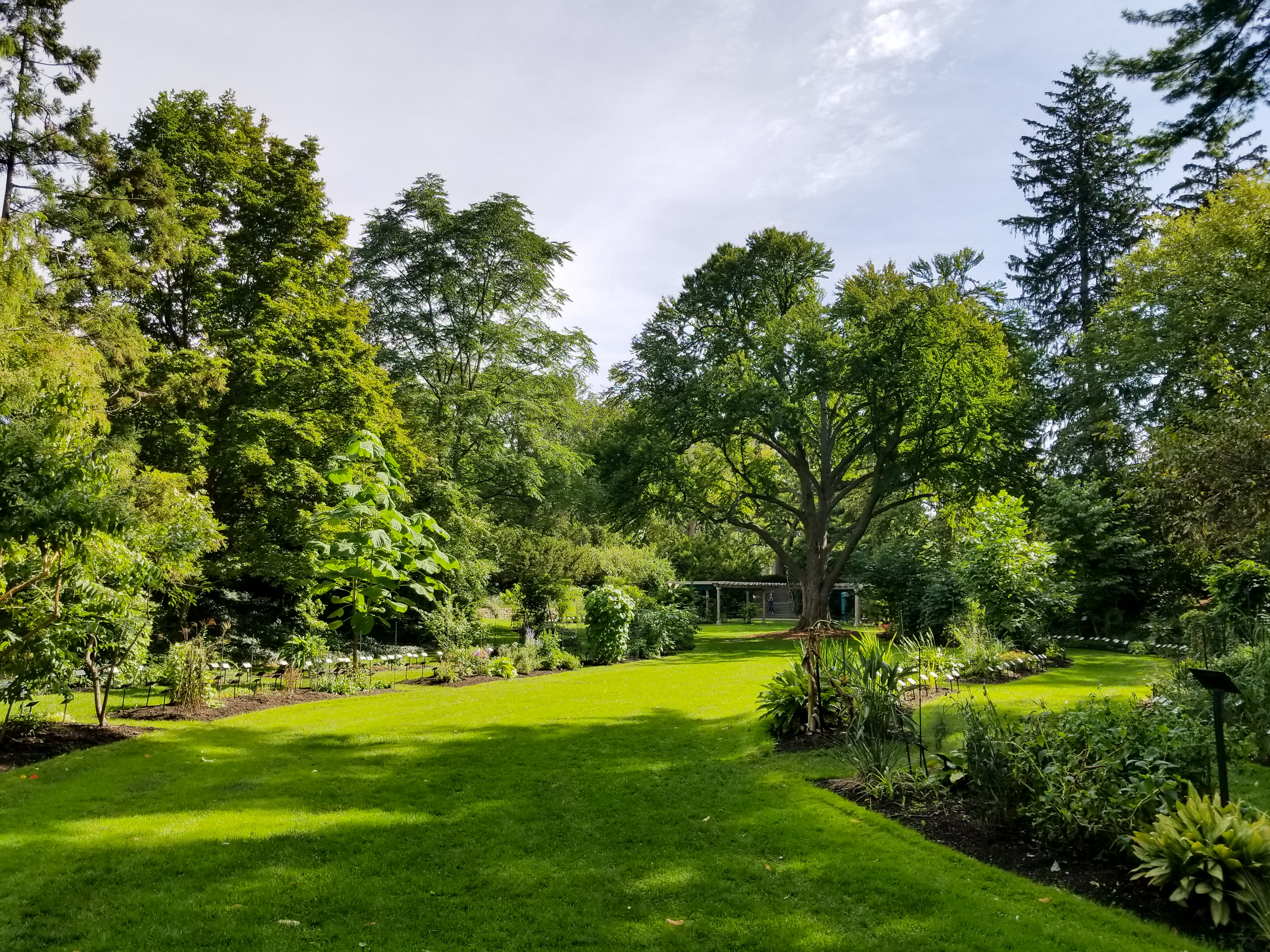
- W. J. Beal Botanical Garden in 2017

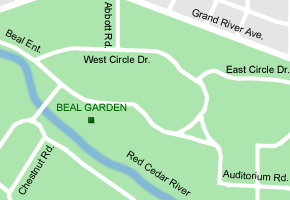
- Beal Garden's location on campus
- Type: Botanical garden
- Location: 330 W CIRCLE DR; Michigan State University; East Lansing, Michigan
- Coordinates: 42.7314°N 84.4846°W
- Area: 5 acres (2.0 ha)
- Opened: 1873
- Etymology: William J. Beal
- Owner: Michigan State University
- Species: 1800
- Collections: economic, systematic, landscape, ecological, Michigan threatened and endangered
- Website: Official website

The W. J. Beal Botanical Garden is a 5-acre (2.0 ha) botanical garden located on the campus of Michigan State University in East Lansing, Michigan, United States. It is claimed to be the oldest continually maintained university botanical garden in the United States and is open to the public without charge year-round during daylight hours. The garden displays 1,800 plant taxa, in economic, systematic, landscape and ecological groupings.

== History ==
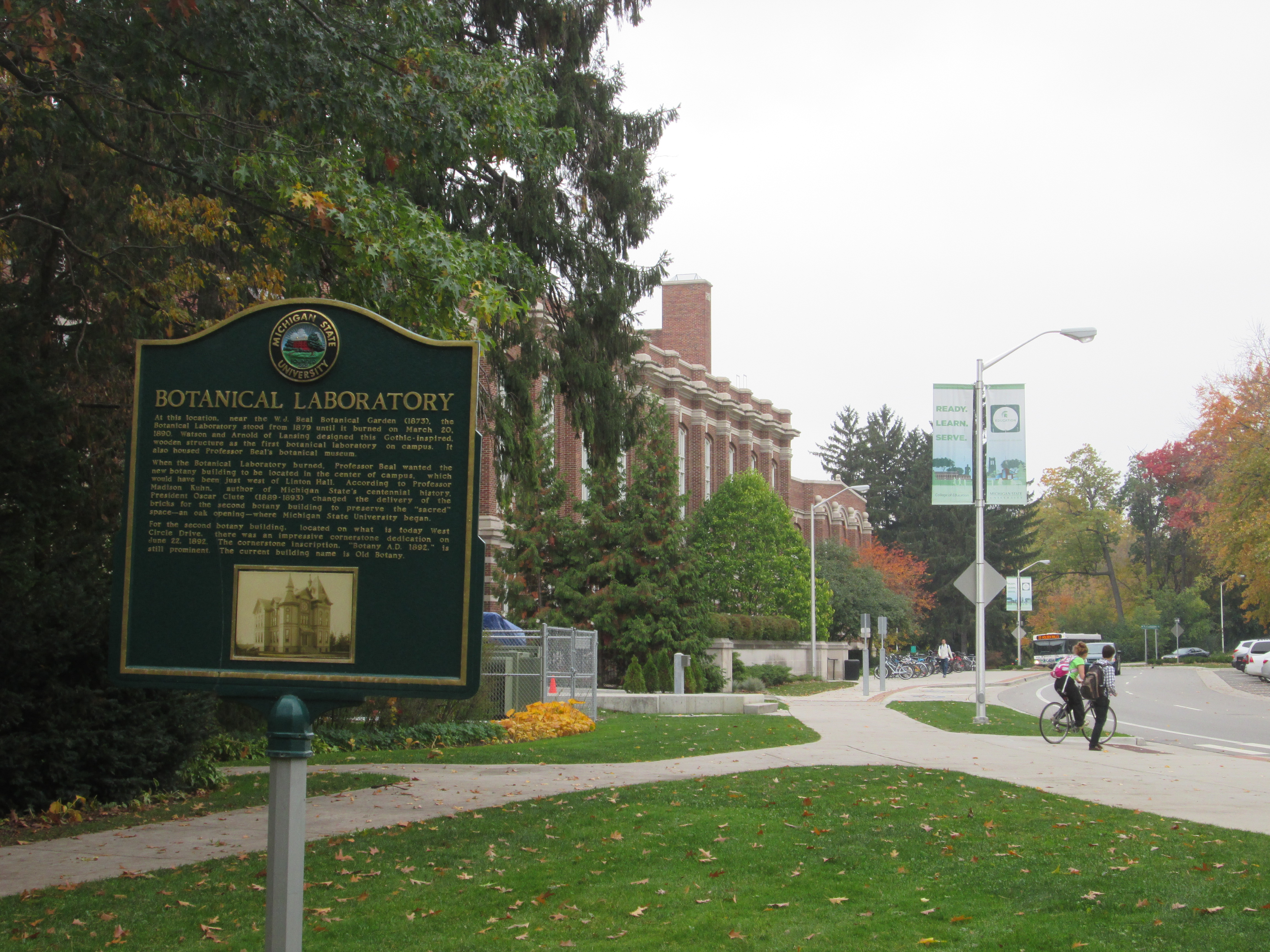
Historical marker providing details of the original Botanical Laboratory

The botanic garden was started by Prof. William James Beal as part of the Department of Botany to serve as an outdoor teaching and research laboratory. Work towards starting the garden began in 1872 with a nursery, followed in 1873 by test plots of 140 species of forage grasses and clovers in a portion of the garden referred to as "Sleepy Hollow". Shortly after founding the botanic garden, Professor Beal established an arboretum on campus in 1874 which began as two rows of swamp white oaks.

For the period of time from 1877 to 1924, the garden was known as "The Botanic Garden" or "Wild Garden" at Michigan Agricultural College. Shortly after Professor Beal's death on May 12, 1924, the garden was officially named for him on December 17, 1924, by the Michigan State Board of Agriculture upon the recommendation of the Department of Botany. After Professor Beal's retirement in 1910, Professor H.T. Darlington was appointed director of the botanic garden in 1914 and served until 1930. The gardens developed from these starting points until 1950, when they were reorganized and redesigned by Prof. Milton Baron to form today's four main collections.

== Updated collections ==
In 1954, the garden began participating in the international seed exchange program, publishing its first Index Seminum, and in 1961 was extended with a collection of acidophilous plants including rhododendrons, azaleas, and ferns. More recently, a collection of Michigan's endangered plants was added in 1986, and the non-flowering vascular plant collection was started in 2001 with ephedras, conifers, ginkgo, cycads, ferns, horsetails and clubmosses.

== Gallery ==
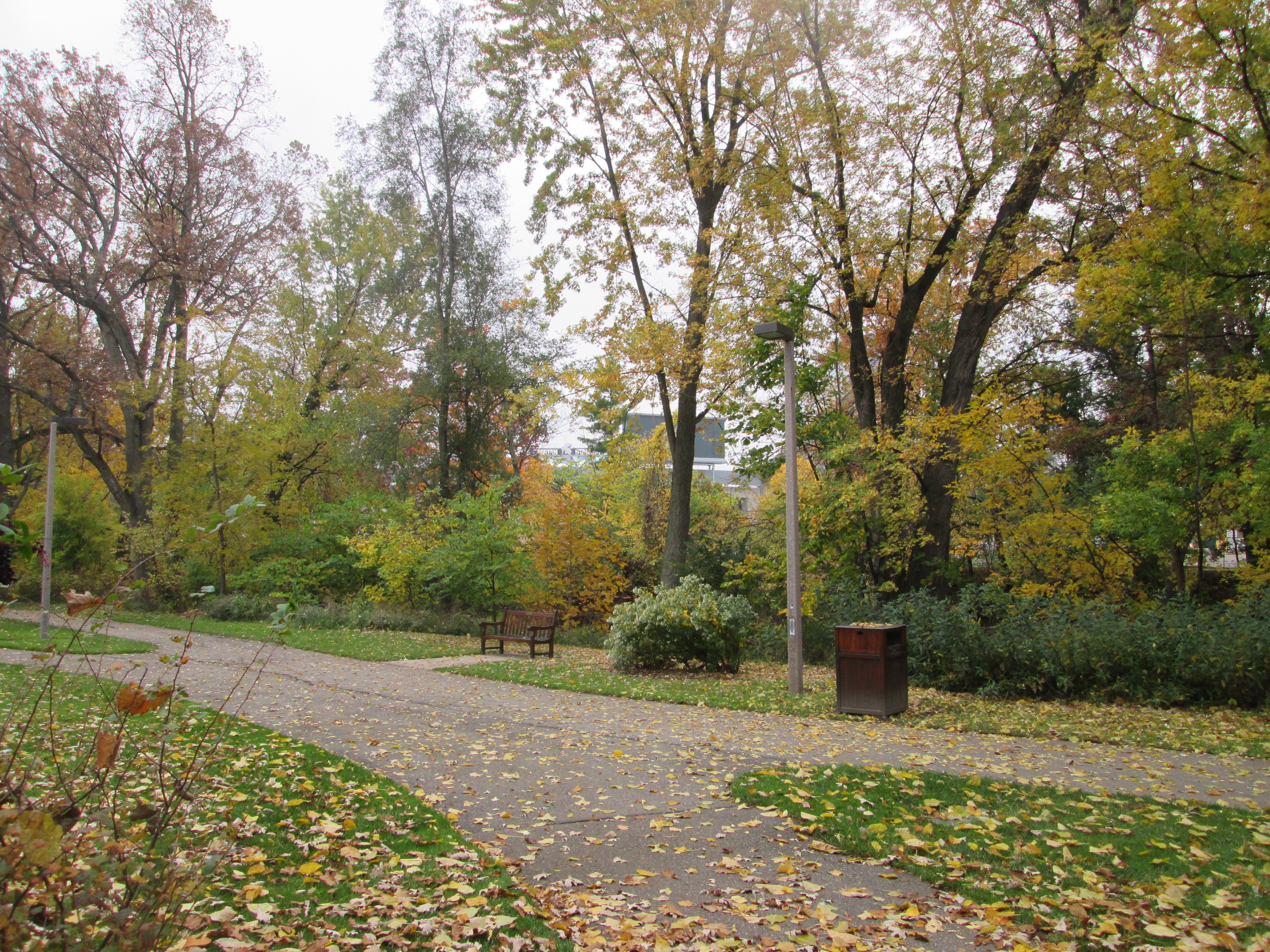

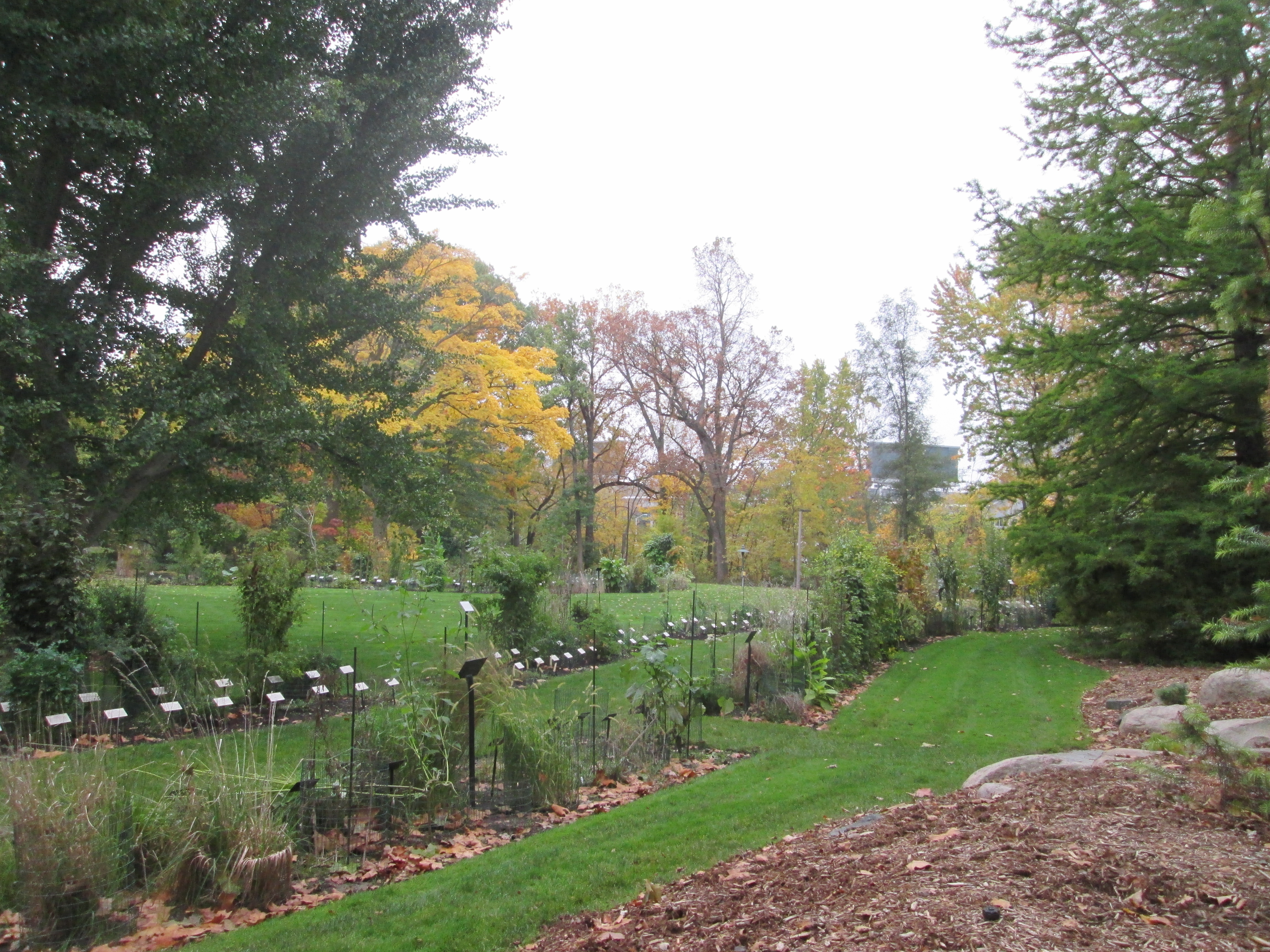

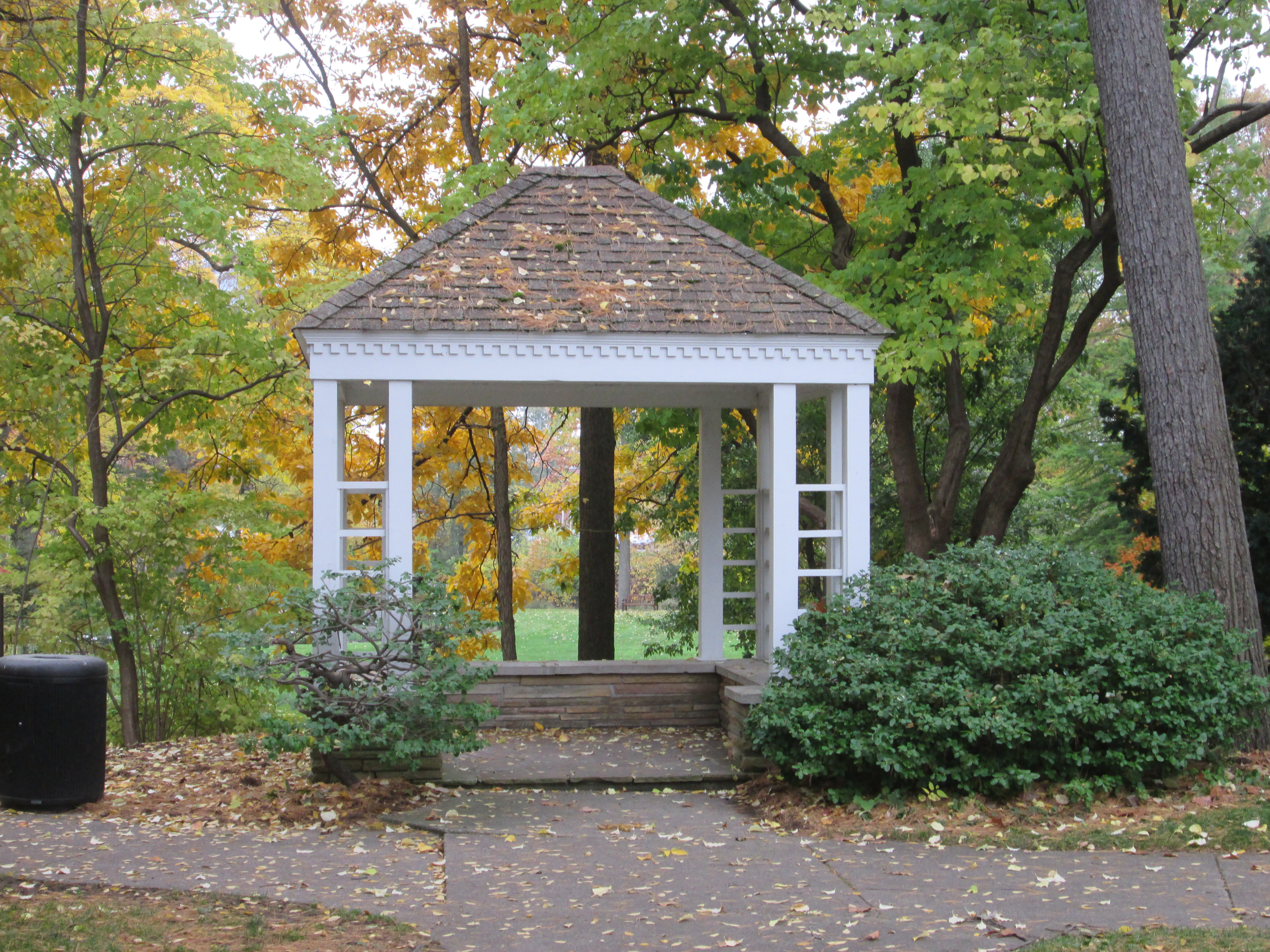

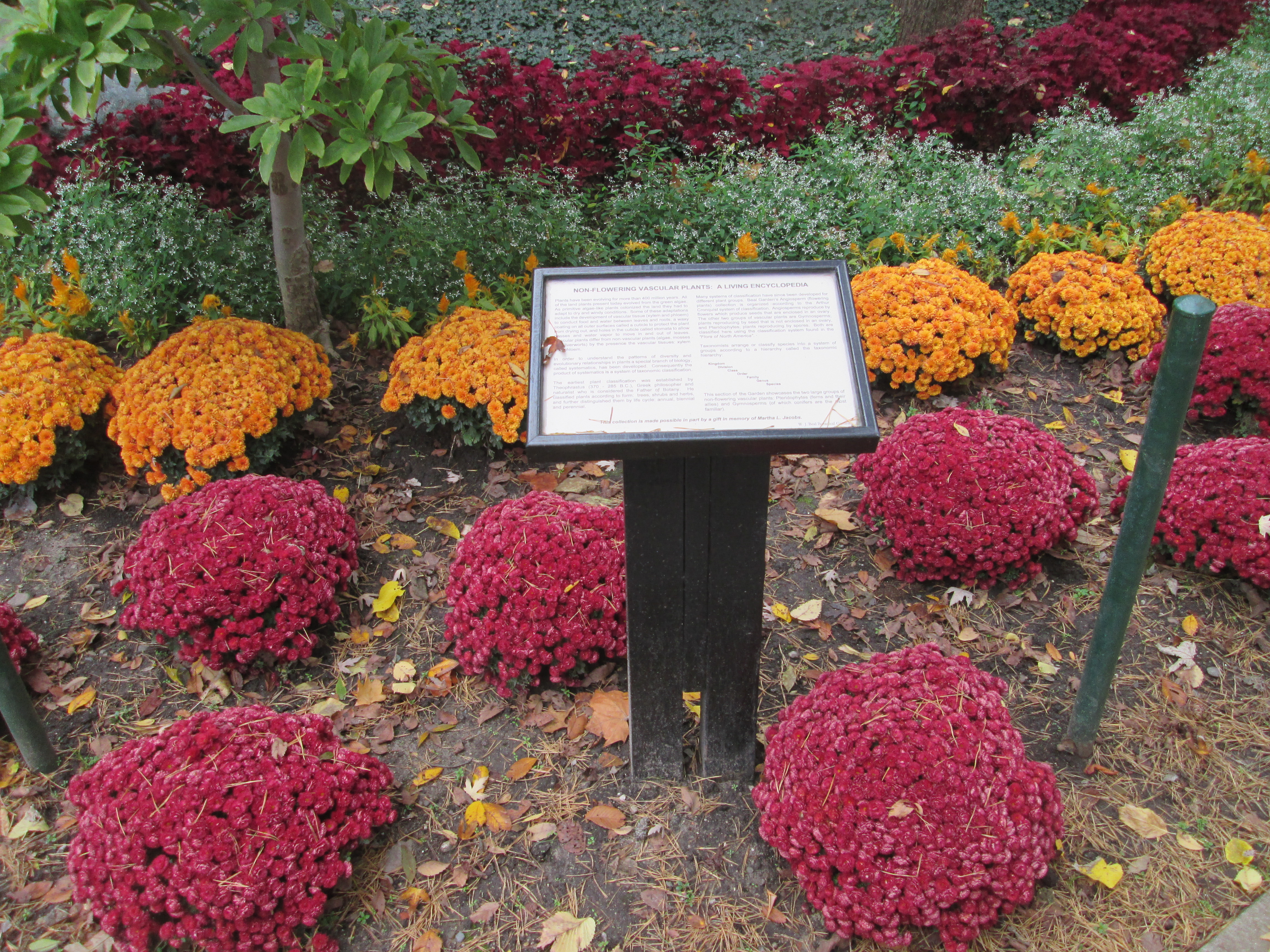

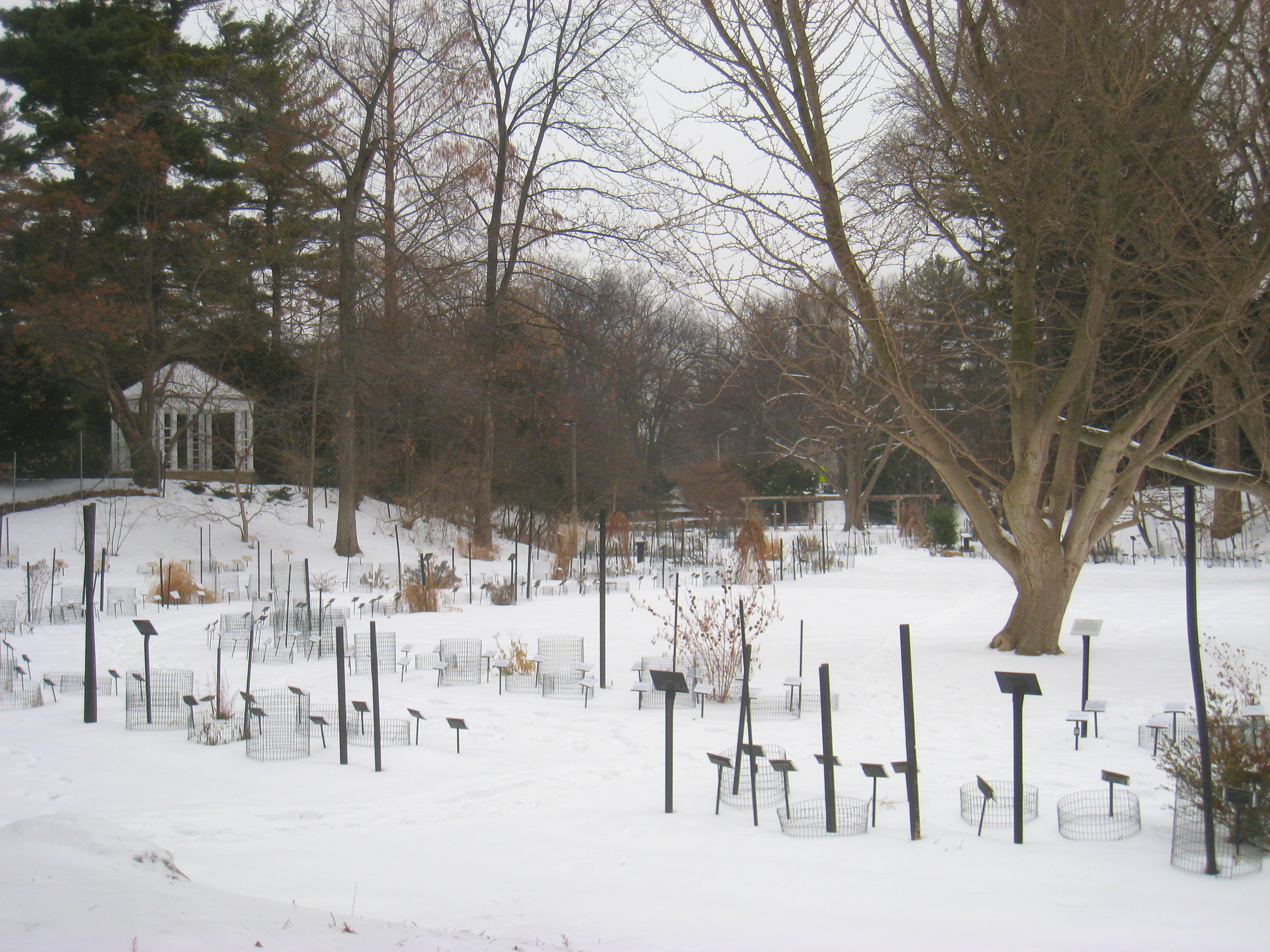

== See also ==
- List of botanical gardens and arboretums in the United States
