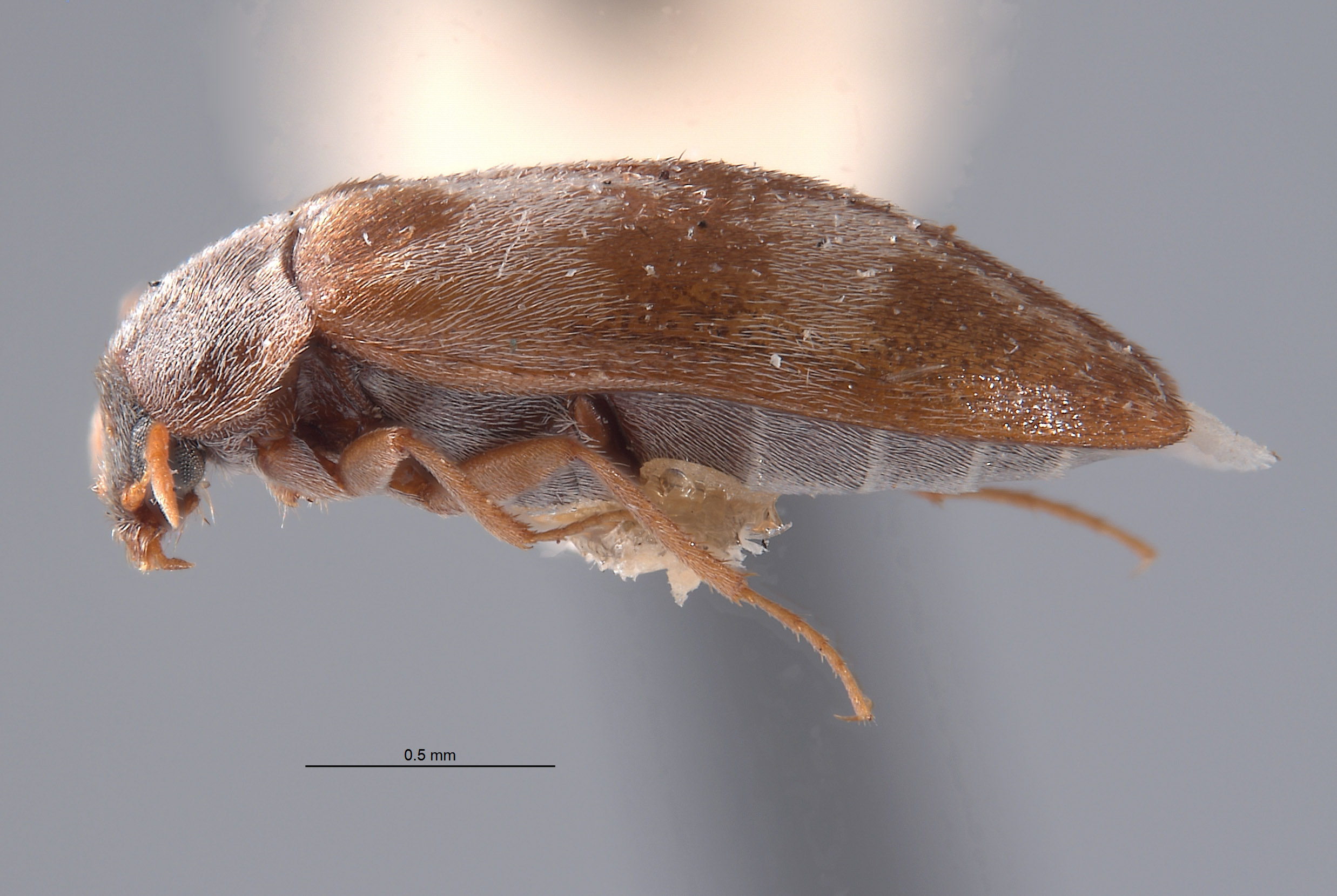
- Novelsis timia

Scientific classification
- Kingdom: Animalia
- Phylum: Arthropoda
- Class: Insecta
- Order: Coleoptera
- Suborder: Polyphaga
- Family: Dermestidae
- Tribe: Attagenini
- Genus: Novelsis; Casey, 1900

= Novelsis =

Genus of beetles

Novelsis is a genus of beetles in the family Dermestidae, containing the following species:

- Novelsis andersoni Beal, 1954
- Novelsis athlophora Beal, 1954
- Novelsis beldensis Hava, 2021
- Novelsis horni Jayne, 1882
- Novelsis picta Casey, 1900
- Novelsis timia Beal, 1954
- Novelsis uteana Casey, 1900
