= Katkaenus =

Katkaenus spectaculus

Scientific classification
- Kingdom: Animalia
- Phylum: Arthropoda
- Class: Insecta
- Order: Coleoptera
- Suborder: Polyphaga
- Family: Dermestidae
- Genus: Katkaenus; Háva, 2006
- Species: K. spectaculus

Binomial name
- Katkaenus spectaculus Háva, 2006

Species of beetle

Katkaenus spectaculus is a species of beetles in the family Dermestidae, the only species in the genus Katkaenus.
