= Michael Oliver (writer, broadcaster) =

Michael Edgar Oliver (20 July 1937 – 1 December 2002) was a BBC broadcaster, writer and journalist on classical music.

Born in Hammersmith, the son of a music-loving plumber, Oliver was educated at St Clement Danes Grammar School, then in North Kensington, at Isleworth Polytechnic and at the London School of Printing. As a conscientious objector, rather than perform national service Oliver opted to work in a hospital, both in the mortuary and the kitchen. Later, as a member of CND, he was arrested during a demonstration, and for refusing to pay the fine spent some time in Brixton Prison.

Before becoming a broadcaster, he pursued, as he put it, "a dozen other trades and professions" during the 1950s and 60s including selling radiators, and working for the Cambridge University Press while spending as much time as possible attending concerts. His other occupation was librarianship.

Oliver presented BBC Radio 3's Music Weekly programme (1975–90), and also was a presenter of BBC Radio 4's Kaleidoscope (1974–87). The author of several books, including biographies of Igor Stravinsky and Benjamin Britten, he was also a regular contributor to The Gramophone, Classic CD, Classic Record Collector and BBC Music Magazine. He was also founding editor of International Opera Collector, a subsidiary of The Gramophone, started in 1996 but closed after only 13 issues, as a consequence of the sale of all the Gramophone magazines in July 1999.

== Bibliography ==
- "Two Welsh Composers: Alun Hoddinott and William Mathias"; "Miscellany: Justin Connolly - Jonathan Harvey - Roger Smalley - Anthony Payne - Tristram Cary - Anthony Milner - Christopher Headington - Robin Holloway - David Ellis" in British Music Now: A Guide to the Work of Younger Composers, ed. Lewis Foreman, 1975. London: Paul Elek. ISBN 0-236-30933-1
- Igor Stravinsky, 1995. London: Phaidon
- Benjamin Britten, 1996. London: Phaidon
- Settling the Score: A Journey through the Music of the 20th Century, 1999. London: Faber & Faber
