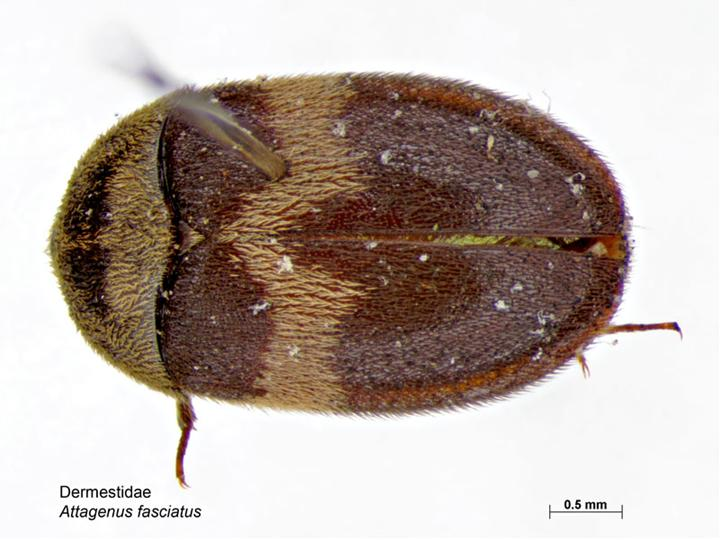
- Attagenus fasciatus

Scientific classification
- Domain: Eukaryota
- Kingdom: Animalia
- Phylum: Arthropoda
- Class: Insecta
- Order: Coleoptera
- Suborder: Polyphaga
- Family: Dermestidae
- Subfamily: Attageninae
- Tribe: Attagenini

= Attagenini =

Tribe of beetles

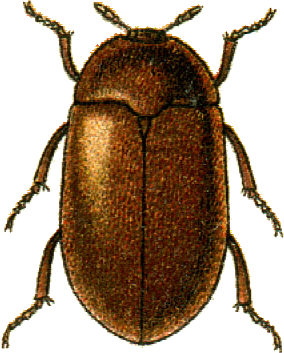
Novelsis uteana

Attagenini is a tribe of carpet beetles in the family Dermestidae. There are at least 4 genera and 20 described species in Attagenini. Attagenini was previously considered a subfamily of Dermestidae called Attageninae, but was reduced in rank to tribe in 2003.

== Genera ==
These four genera belong to the tribe Attagenini:

- Attagenus Latreille, 1802 (black carpet beetles)
- Aethriostoma Motschulsky, 1858
- Egidyella Reitter, 1899
- Katkaenus Háva, 2006
- Lanorus Mulsant & Rey, 1868
- Novelsis Casey, 1900
- Telopes Redtenbacher in Russegger, 1843
