= Organ of St. Martin's Church (Memmingen) =

Pipe organ in St. Martin's Church, Memmingen, Germany

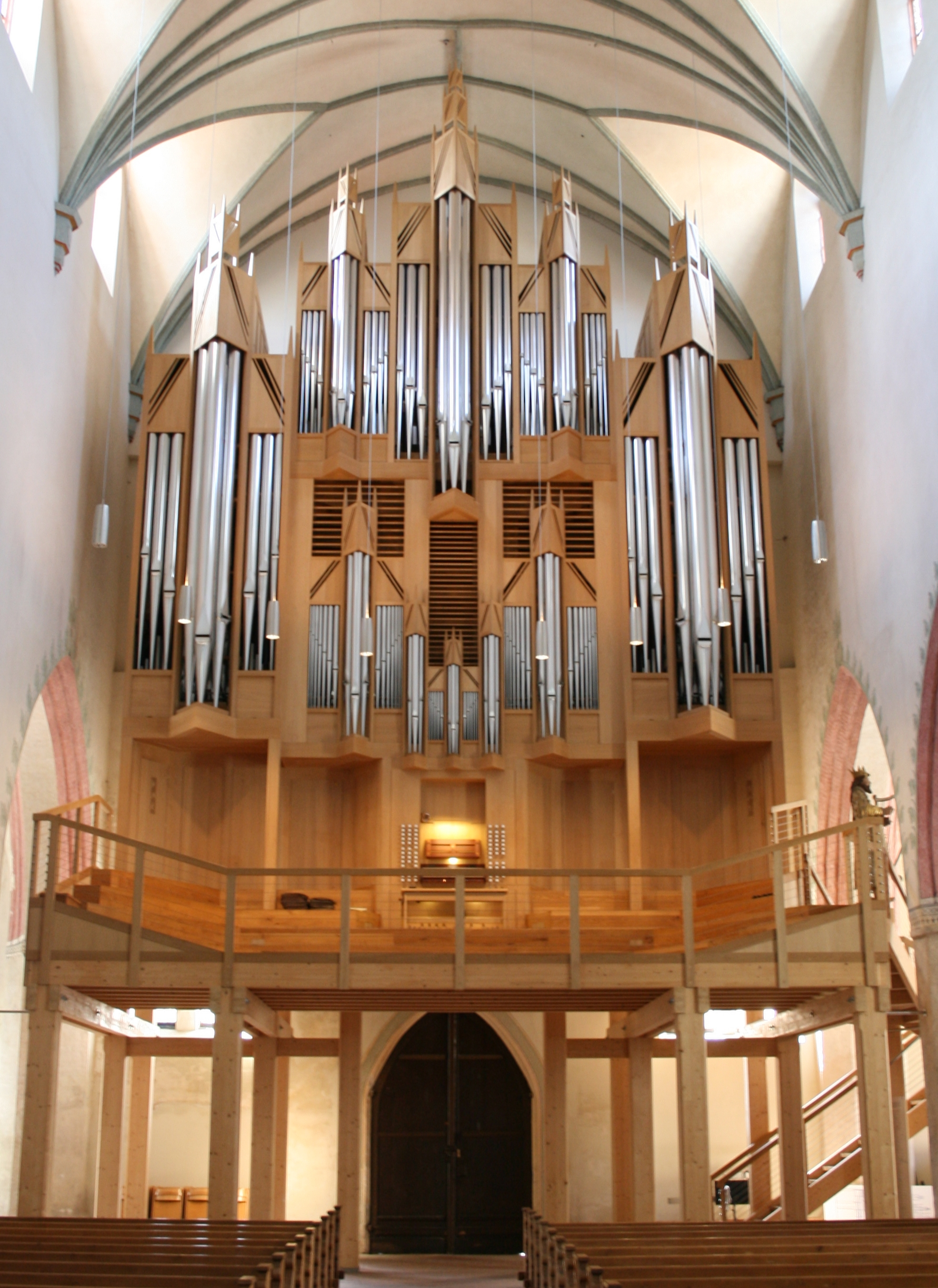
- Developed: 20th century

Builders
- Goll Organ Builders

The organ of St. Martin is located in the Lutheran city parish church of St. Martin's Church, Memmingen, in the Upper Swabian town of Memmingen, Bavaria, Germany. The church itself is a three-aisled hall church begun around 1325 and completed around 1500. It serves as the main church of the Evangelical Lutheran Deanery of Memmingen. The building has housed an organ for over 500 years.

The present instrument was built in 1998 by Goll Orgelbau of Lucerne and is conceived in the tradition of the French symphonic organ of the late 19th century, particularly the style of Aristide Cavaillé-Coll. It is used regularly for services, concerts, masterclasses, and recordings.

== History ==
=== Late Gothic Organ ===
The first organ in St. Martin was mentioned for the first time in 1453, acquired around 1400 and installed at the earliest in 1420, after the completion of the main nave, on a swallow’s-nest gallery on the southern wall of the high nave. Access was via a small stair turret at the front southern porch. The bellows were presumably located above the side aisle in a chamber. The organ was probably built as a Blockwerk with a separately playable Principal. During the subsequent construction work in St. Martin, it did not need to be altered. The chronicler Jakob Friederich Unold reports that the organ was first played in the worship service in 1478.

The first Kantor was presumably Friedrich Rebmann from Mainz. In 1500 the city appointed, until further notice, the organist Albrecht Fischer, who was responsible for the organs in St. Martin and in the second city parish church, Unser Frauen. He was paid twelve pounds and ten shillings each Quatember (quarter tense/Ember days), but had to pay the calcants himself. In 1528 the organ was removed in the course of the Reformation in Memmingen, which at that time was oriented toward Ulrich Zwingli and his reformatory iconoclasm. However, the evangelical clergy of St. Martin wanted to shape the worship service again with organ music, which is why in 1568 they made do with a positive. Its location at that time is unknown.

=== New construction by Andreas Schneider 1598/1599 ===
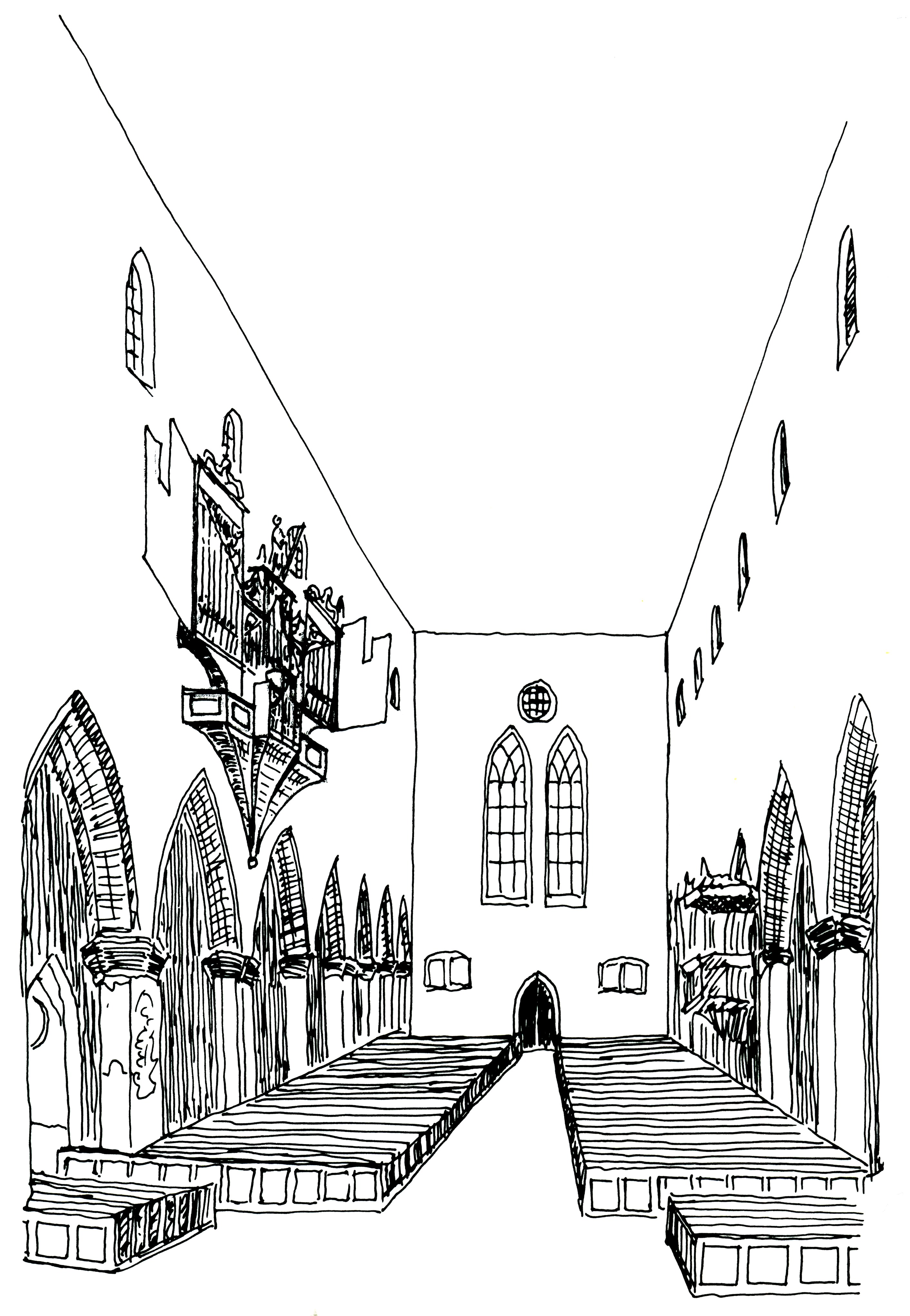
1598 Schneider organ (top left, on the swallow’s-nest gallery)

Since the iconoclasm of the Reformation period, the imperial city of Memmingen no longer possessed a representative organ. After the pastors of the two city parish churches had repeatedly but unsuccessfully campaigned since 1550 for the acquisition of a new, large instrument, the council – which had governed the churches since the Reformation – relented in 1597. It commissioned Andreas Schneider from Lower Lusatia, who was active as an organ builder in Ulm, to build a new organ. Schneider, who lived in the city with his journeymen during the construction period 1598/1599, received 5,000 guilders for his work. The organ was erected on the swallow’s-nest gallery of its predecessor. The case was richly gilded and decorated with carvings and many angel heads. On the central tower the case bore a statue of King David, which today stands on the balustrade of the Goll organ. On the lids of the organ case were portraits of the mayors Hartlieb, Keller and Funk, the parish administrator, and several other persons. The paintings were presumably attached to the balustrade panels of the Rückpositiv. The wing doors bore Old Testament scenes.

After completion, the Fugger court organist Hans Leo Haßler declared the organ on 21 November 1599 to be “successful.” Two years later, however, defects were discovered that Schneider was able to remedy. In 1681 Johannes Riegg repaired the organ. The following inscription could be read on a façade pipe: “Johannes Riegg, organ maker and organist there, renov. the organ work in Memmingen on the 1st hay month 1681.” Riegg presumably made no changes to the sound and merely repaired the mechanism, though in doing so he damaged the instrument more than he repaired it. The disposition of that time has not survived. In comparison with other Riegg instruments, especially the one in Ulm Minster and the later reworkings, it was presumably laid out as follows:

Masterwork C–c^{3}
Principal	8′
Coupler	8′
Hollow pipe	8′
Fifth tones	8′
Octave	4′
Rim pipe	4′
Sharps pipe	4′
Fifth	3′
Super octave	2′
Horn II
Mixed IV	1′
Cymbalum IV	1/2′
Trumpet	8′
Tremulant

Positive organ C–c^{3}
Principal	4′
Coupler	4′
Octave	2′
Sharps pipe	2′
Fifth	1 1/2′
Mixed IV	1′
Cymbalum II	1/2′
Brass horn	4′
Tremulant

Pedal C–h^{1}
Great principal	16′
Octave bass	8′
Great principal	4′
Harp IV	4′
Trombone bass	8′

- Playing aids: Stop valves for the Great and the Swell.

In 1656, city architect Knoll built a bridge-like or rood screen-like gallery between the triumphal arch at the choir entrance and the first pair of pillars, presumably as a place for singers and instrumentalists who played alone or together with the organ, since the swallow's nest did not offer enough space for a larger number of people. It also made sense to distribute musicians across several galleries for the performance practice of polyphonic music, which was popular at the time. Until 1827, this gallery also housed a small organ, which was later moved to the children's teaching church and used there until 1874. It was probably built by master organ builder Siegmund Riegg.

The disposition was:

Manual C–c^{3}
Coupler	8′	Wood
Principal	4′	Tin
Flute	4′	Wood
Cymbal	2′	Tin
Salicional	2'	Tin
Mixed	3′	Tin

Repair by Gabler 1759

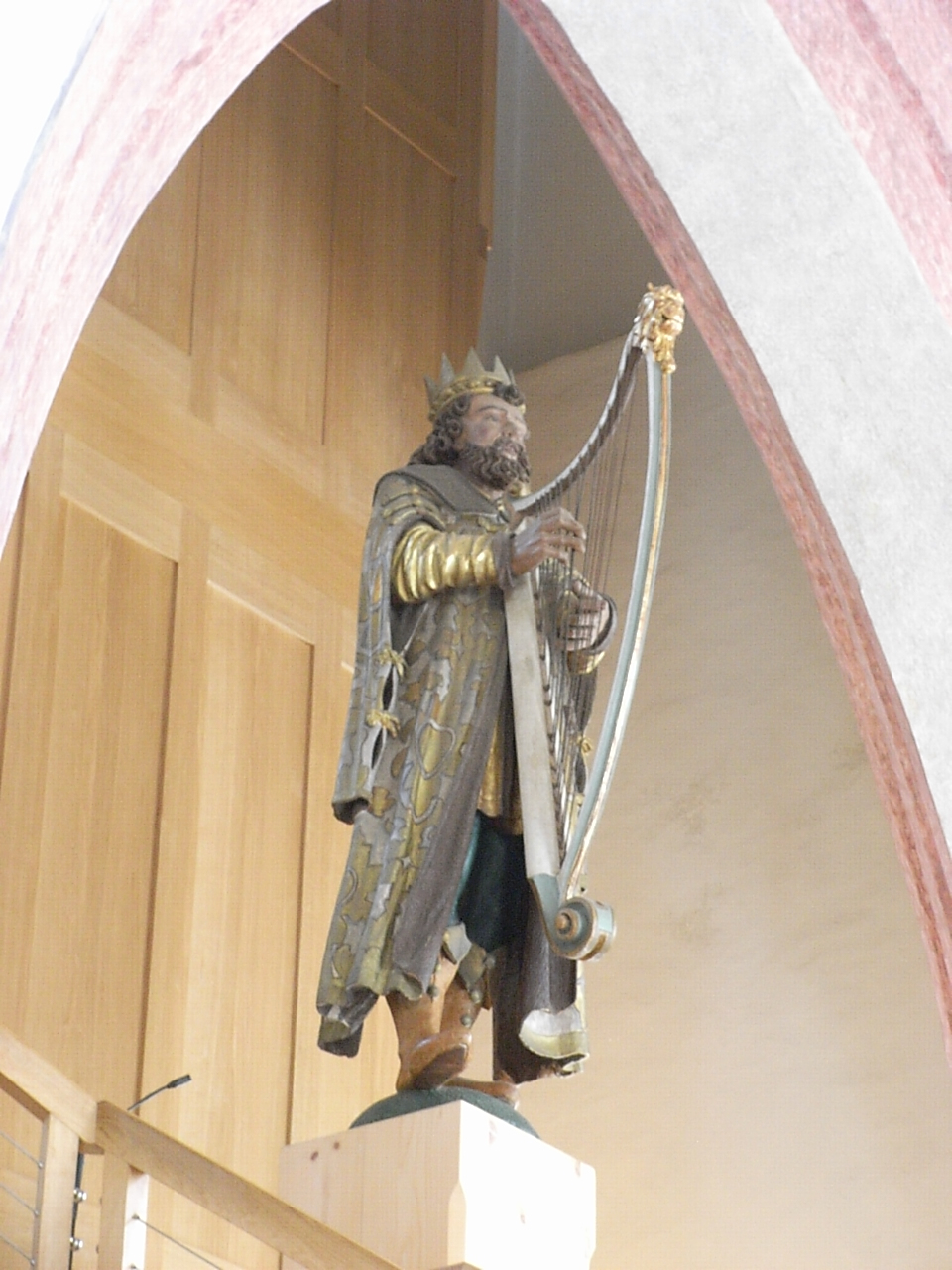
Organ statue

After Riegg’s inadequate repair, Joseph Gabler was commissioned in 1758 to carry out another restoration, which lasted 15 months. Gabler also overhauled the organs in the Latin school and in the Collegium musicum. The three restorations together had been budgeted at 400 guilders, but ultimately cost 1,500 guilders, of which the city paid 1,080. Two months later, at Gabler’s request, the council paid an additional 30 guilders. During the restoration the disposition was modernised by incorporating Gabler’s typical tonal elements. The city archive records: “He has repaired the organ well and brought it into perfect condition, so that one found a strange pleasure in it.” Johann Nepomuk Holzhey gave the organ its last overhaul in 1778 for 433 guilders. After Memmingen lost its imperial freedom in 1802 and was incorporated into the Electorate of Bavaria in 1803, St. Martin also came under the ecclesiastical jurisdiction of the Electorate.

In 1807 the organist Johann Konrad Ellmer, the organ builder Georg Rabus and the city music director Georg von Unold examined the large organ and concluded that it was in need of repair. They calculated 18 guilders for a makeshift repair and 140 guilders for a comprehensive restoration, but both proposals were rejected for cost reasons. As the swallow’s-nest gallery had become increasingly dilapidated, the parish decided in 1827 to abandon it. It was dismantled the same year and the organ was moved by Meinrad Dreher from Illereichen (Altenstadt) to the west wall of the main nave. Dreher completely repaired the instrument, added the two new reed stops Bombard 16′ and Clairon 4′, and removed both tremulants, the cut-off valve and the manual coupler installed by Gabler. The bellows were patched and unfortunately placed under the roof of the side aisle. The cost of relocation and repair amounted to 1,200 guilders. On 26 January 1828 the organ was played again for the first time, but at its new location no longer had the same sound as in the swallow’s-nest. A new case had to be built. Parts of the old prospect were incorporated into a Baroque coffered ceiling in Schloss Illerfeld in Volkratshofen. After this reworking the organ had the following disposition:

Masterwork
Principal	8′
Coupler	8′
Hollow pipe	8′
Octave	4′
Superoctave	2′
Sixth grade IV–VI	1′
Mixed IV–V	1′
Cymbalum IV–V	1′
Tremulant (Adagio)

Positive organ
Quint tones	8′
Principal	4′
Couplerflette	4′
Pipe flute	4′
Octave	2′
Hollow pipe	2′
Mixed III	1′
Cymbalum II	1′
Trumpet	8′
Oboe	8′
Tremulant (Allegro)

Pedal
Prestant	16′
Board bass	16′
Octave bass	8′
Double bass II	8′
Mixture bass VII	4′
Trombone bass	8′

- Couplers: RP/HW, HW/P.
- Playing aids: Valve for the entire organ, Calcanten bell.

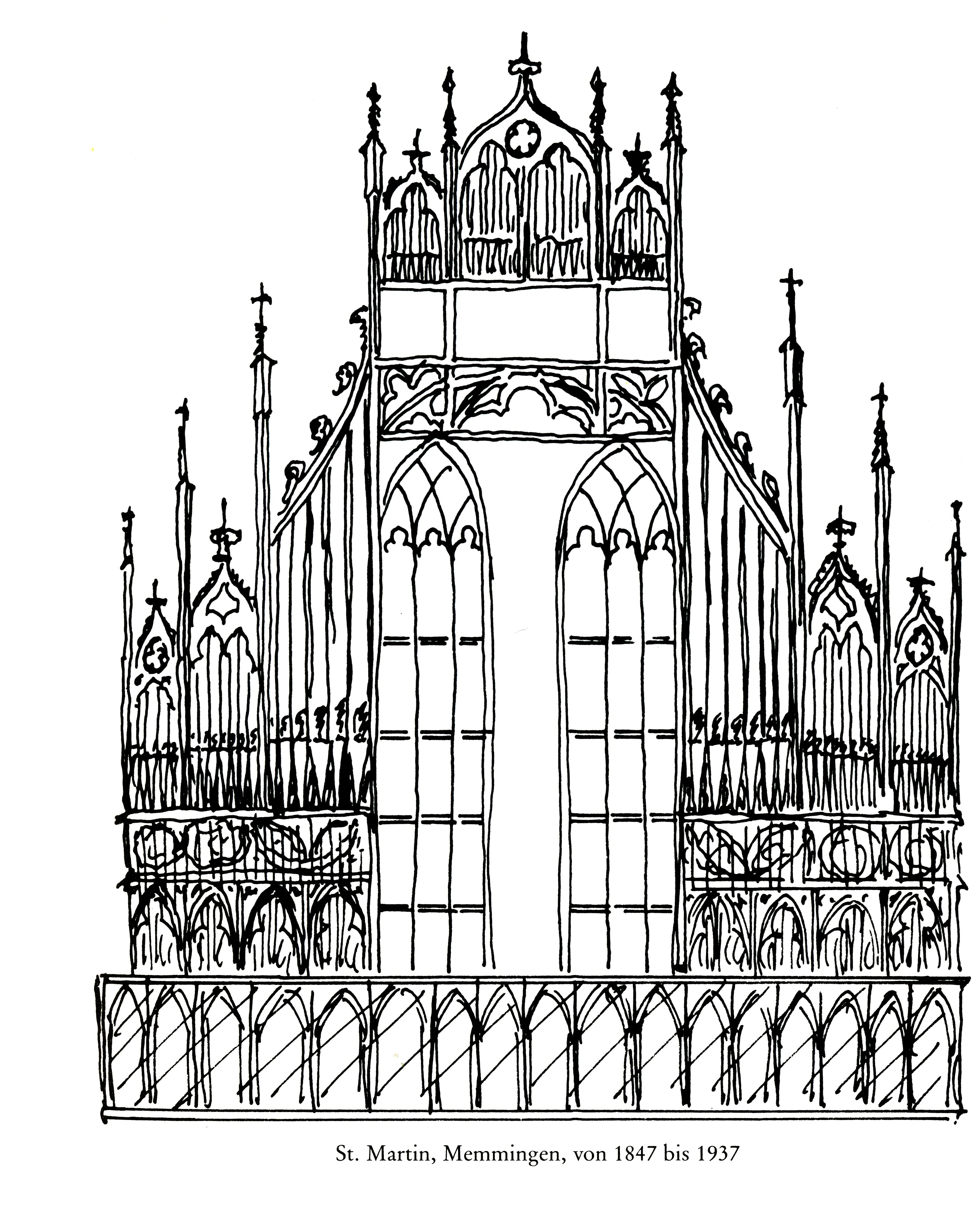
Organ of 1845

=== Rebuild by Samuel Friedrich Schäfer 1845 ===
In 1845 the organ on the west wall was rebuilt by Samuel Friedrich Schäfer from Wolfschlugen. Between 15 April and 25 May 1845 a positive was used for church services. The neo-Gothic case of the rebuilt organ, which was completed in the summer of 1847, consisted of two case sections each with three pointed-arch pipe fields, grouped descending from the inside outwards on either side of the window wall. The instrument, however, proved unusable because Schäfer had not professionally combined the reused old stops with the newly developed cone chests. The rebuild cost 4,800 guilders for the organ itself and 400 guilders for the bellows chamber.

The disposition was structured as follows:

Hauptwerk C–f^{3}
Pentatone	16′
Principal	8′
Coupler	8′
Hollow pipe	8′
Viola da gamba	8′
Octave	4′
Superoctave	2′
Sesquialter
Mixed	2 2/3′

Superstructure
Salicional	8′
Pentatone	8′
Principal	4′
Coupler flute	4′
Dolce	4′
Octave	2′
Hollow pipe	2′
Mixed

Pedal C–c^{1}
Prestant	16′
Subbass	16′
Double bass	16′
Octave bass	8′
Double bass	8′
Quintbass	5 1/3′
Trombone bass	16′
Trombone	8′
Clairon	4′

=== New organ by Walcker & Spaich 1853 ===
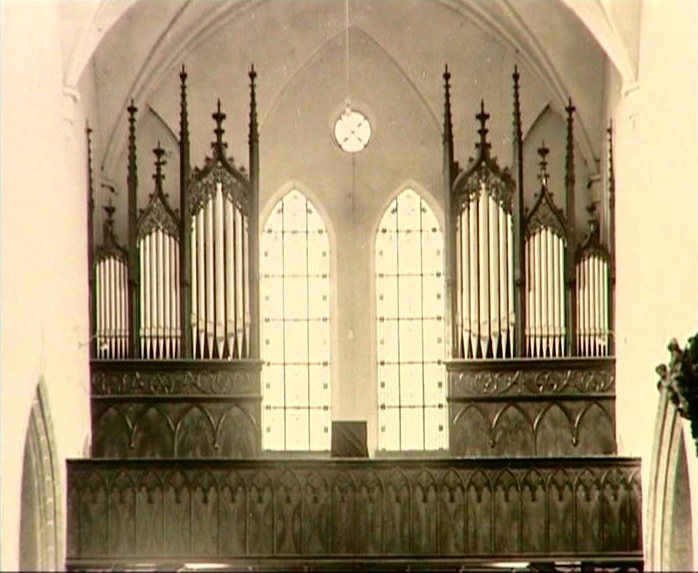
The organ of 1853

In 1853 a new organ was acquired. Both the neo-Gothic case and the instrument were built by the organ-building workshop Walcker & Spaich of Ludwigsburg, which had shortly before constructed a new organ for the Frauenkirche (Church of Our Lady). At the organ trial on 11 July 1853, the Augsburg Kapellmeister Karl Ludwig Drobisch described the instrument as “completely successful and masterly”. The gallery had to be enlarged for the new organ, which cost 5,700 guilders. Walcker took the old organ in part-exchange. With the new organ, organ music once again came into the public eye in the church. The instrument was repaired by Steinmeyer in 1900 and fitted with a new blower.

The organ had the following disposition:

I. Manual C–f^{3}
Principal	16′
Principal	8′
Fute	8′
Gamba	8′
Salicional	8′
Pedal	8′
Octave	4′
Transverse flute	4′
Pedal	4′
Quint	2 2/3′
Wood flute	2′
Mixed VI	2 2/3′
Sharp III	1′
Trumpet	8′

II. Manual C-f^{3}
Pedal	16′
Principal	8′
Favorite pedal	8′
Dolce	8′
Harmonica	8′
Gem horn	4′
Viola	4′
pipe flute	4′
Octave	2′
Cornet V	2 2/3′
Basset horn	8′

Pedal C-d^{1}
Principal bass	16′
Subbass	16′
Violon	16′
Octave bass	8′
Violon	8′
Octave	4′
Trombone	16′
Bassoon	8′

=== Extension by Paul Ott 1938 ===
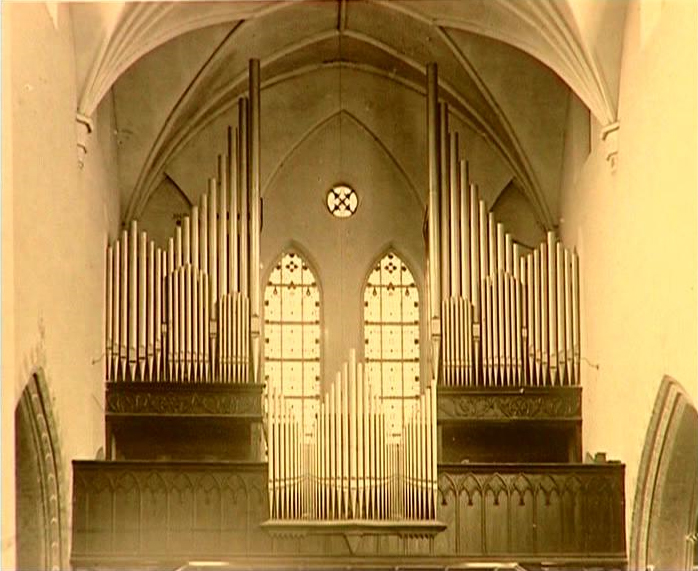
The organ of 1938

The extension of the Walcker organ planned in 1924 was finally carried out in 1938 by Paul Ott of Göttingen. The Main organ, Schwellwerk, and Pedal were on cone chests, while the new Rückpositiv was on slider chests. The action was electric throughout. The case had to be altered for the extension: the neo-Gothic superstructure was abandoned in favour of a free-pipe prospect. On a new inset gallery, three pipe fields on each side sloped downward from the outside inward. The centre was left open so that the double gallery windows remained visible. Behind the manual divisions stood the pedal pipes, divided into C and C-sharp sides and descending in size from inside to outside. Beneath the gallery, the Rückpositiv – with three pipe groups forming a W shape – was recessed centrally into the balustrade.

After the rebuild the disposition was as follows:

Main organ C-f^{3}
Principal	16′
Principal	8′
Wooden flute	8′
Gamba	8′
Octave	4′
Small-scale	4′
Nasat	2 2/3′
Octave	2′
Wooden flute	2′
Mixed V–VI
Sharp III
Trumpet	16′
Trumpet	8′
Trumpet	4′

Swell organ C-f^{3}
Quintet	16′
Principal	8′
Favorite pedal	8′
Dolce	8′
Principal	4′
Gem horn	4′
Pipe flute	4′
Hollow flute	2′
Mixed V
Bassoon	16′
Dulcian	8′
Tremulant

Positive back C-f^{3}
Principal	8′
Wooden roof	8′
Octave	4′
Blockflute	4′
Flute	2′
Terce	1 3/5′
Quintet	1 1/3′
Night horn	1′
Sharp IV
Rankett	16′
Crumhorn	8′
Shelf	4′
Tremulant

Pedal C-f^{1}
Principal bass	32′
Principal	16′
Subbass	16′
Octave bass	8′
Pedal	8′
Octave	4′
Mixed V
Trombone	16′
Bassoon (Tr.)	16′
Bassoon	8′
Trumpet	4′
Cornet	2′

- Couplers: Normal couplers.
- 2 free combinations, 2 free pedal combinations for RP and SW
- Zimbelstern

=== New organ by Walcker 1962 ===
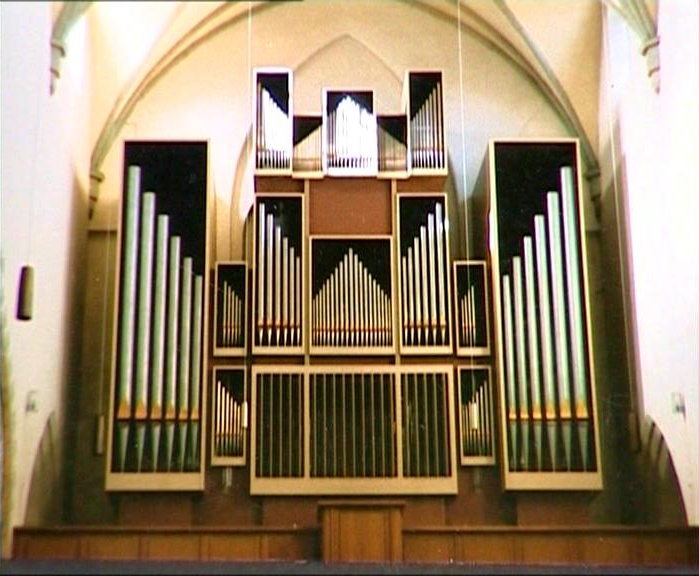
The organ of 1962 shortly before its removal

After the parish had long desired a larger instrument, planning for a new organ began in the early 1960s. In 1962 the congregation commissioned E. F. Walcker & Cie. of Ludwigsburg to erect a new organ at the existing location on the west wall. To make room, the large windows behind it were bricked up. The previous organ, including its case, was completely removed and destroyed. The new case consisted of 14 rectangular pipe fields enclosed in boxes and three louvred fields for the swell box. The design of the case was by the architect Wolfgang Gsaenger. The centre was arranged in three tiers: at the bottom the Swell, above it a three-bay Main work with a lower middle section, and at the very top a five-bay upper work. The tonal design followed the then-current neo-Baroque ideals (turning away from the fundamental-heavy sound of the Romantic period, with a large variety of upperwork and mixture stops), although a swell division was also included to broaden the dynamic range. The two lower levels were connected to the tall pedal towers by small intermediate fields. Because the sound no longer satisfied and because large amounts of plywood, particle board and foam had been used in construction, the technical durability was poor; after only about 35 years the instrument had to be replaced. The disposition of the Walcker organ (opus 3984) was as follows:

I Crown work C–g^{3}
Lead-covered	8′
Quintadena	8′
Prestant	4′
Night horn	4′
Octave	2′
Larigot	1 1/3′
SextanT	1 1/7′
Small cornet III	2 2/3′
Cymbals IV–V	1′
Rankett	16′
Tremolo

II Main work C–g^{3}
Pommer	16′
Principal	8′
Pipe flute	8′
Gem horn	8′
Octave	4′
Small-scale	4′
Swing	2′
Great Sesquialtera II	5 1/3′
Fifth interval II	2 2/3′
Mixed VI–VIII
Sharp IV
Trumpet	8′
Clairon	4′

III Swell organ C–g^{3}
Principal flute	8′
Willow flute	8′
Favorite pedal	8′
Quint flute	5 1/3′
Principal	4′
Coupled flute	4′
Nasard	2 2/3′
Wood flute	2′
Terce	1 3/5′
Flute	1′
None	8/9′
Sharp mixture V–VII
DulCian	16′
Oboe	8′
Pipe shawm	4′
Tremolo

Pedal C–f^{1}
Base	32′
Principal bass	16′
Subbass	16′
Double bass	16′
Quint	10 2/3′
Octave bass	8′
Covered bass	8′
Choral bass III	4′
Pommer	4′
Pipe quintade	2′
Bass cornet IV	5 1/3′
Mixture VI	2 2/3′
Octave cornet III	2′
Trombone	16′
Sordun	16′
Trumpet	8′
Clarinet	4′

Sliding chest, mechanical playing action, and electric stop action.

=== New organ by Goll 1998 ===
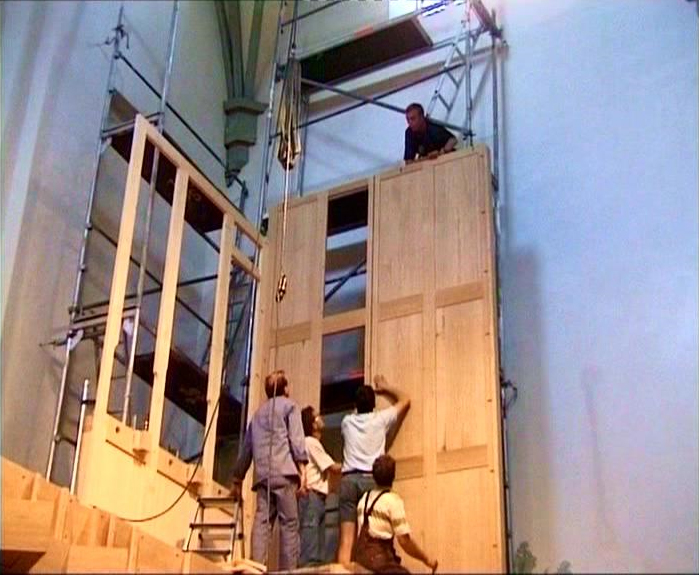
Construction of the new organ

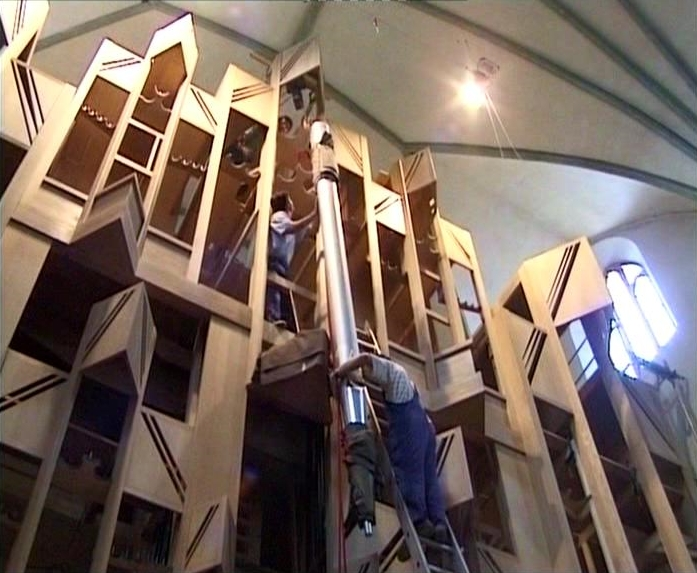
Pipes being installed in the completed case

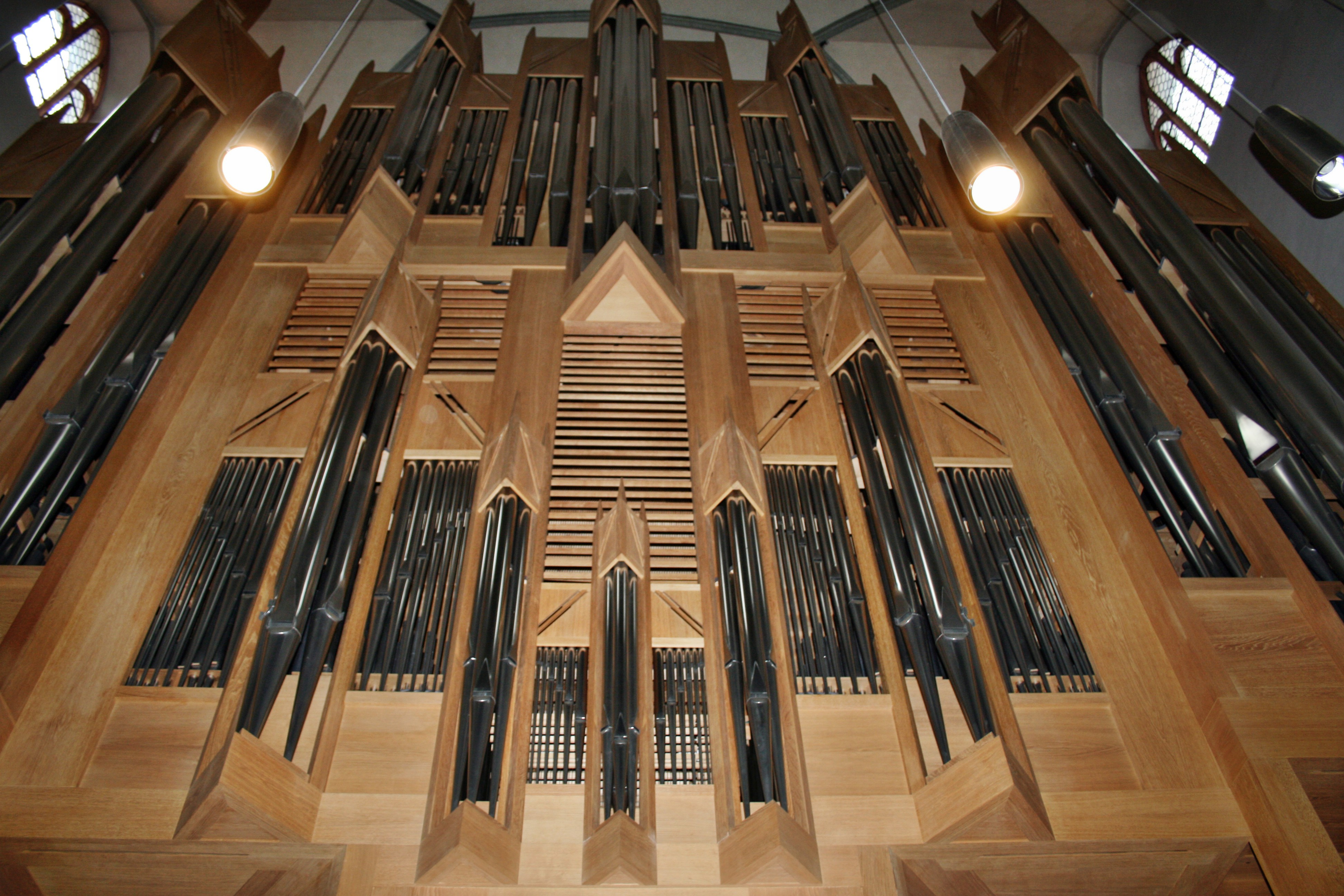
View of the organ from the gallery

With the appointment of Hans-Eberhard Roß in 1991, the parish developed a new organ concept, as the previous instrument was beyond repair. A large modern organ was to be installed at the existing location on the west wall. The weak resonance of the 72-metre-long and 20-metre-high church space required a powerful yet flexible foundation and mid-range. The decision was made for a symphonic organ in the French tradition. Parish members were actively involved in the project; the church council organised trips to the five shortlisted organ builders. The new organ from Goll Orgelbau was inaugurated on 8 November 1998. It cost 2.2 million DM, of which 2 million DM came from donations and approximately 200,000 DM from public grants. The first instalment was paid in 1994, the last upon inauguration in 1998.

The organ has four manuals and pedal, together comprising 62 stops and 4,285 pipes. It occupies the entire west façade from the first gallery upwards, except for the section above the bride’s door. The case, made of untreated oak, is simple in form yet creates a strong architectural accent. It measures 9.10 m wide, 13.9 m high, and only 2.80 m deep. The ascending lines of the façade pipes produce a striking vertical emphasis, especially in the Positiv fields. The Gothic upward thrust is counterpointed by veil boards that imitate a roof-like movement. No two fields are identical; tapering points and small tower finials add further detail – all modern, restrained interpretations of Gothic elements.

Main organ, pedal, and positive are visible from the outside; the Récit and Solo divisions are enclosed within the case. The 18-stop Récit (swell) stands behind the ornamental grille between Positiv and Main organ. The three high-pressure reeds of the Solo division are placed horizontally at the top behind the Main organ. They were built as English tubas so that their power develops from the fundamental rather than through harsh upper partials. This internal layout allowed the action to be single-armed with a minimum of angles and deflections. The simple tracker runs, with low mass and minimal friction losses, made it possible for all couplers to be purely mechanical – no Barker levers or balanciers are used. Even with manuals coupled, the instrument remains fully usable for Romantic-virtuoso playing. All divisions are on slider chests. Electric blowers feed two separate wind systems. The stop action is dual mechanical/electric. The easily grasped stop knobs allow three or four stops to be drawn at once. An additional electronic combination system (4 × 8 combinations on 99 levels) includes a diskette drive for storing and recalling registrations. This permitted the console to remain extremely simple: apart from the combination bar beneath the first manual, there are only the four pedal couplers and forward/backward sequencer pedals.

The gallery provides space for about 70 choristers or a large orchestra. The balustrade is bounded by thin wire cables. The pew backs in the front part of the nave can be folded forward, allowing around 300 listeners at organ concerts to sit facing both instrument and player.

The staircase to the gallery wraps around a pillar bearing the statue of King David that already belonged to the 1598 swallow’s-nest organ. In the “loudspeaker grilles” of the outer case doors are three carved figures on each side depicting organ-building activities; they were designed by Jakob Schmidt (Goll Orgelbau) and executed by the Lucerne wood-carver Vreni Tscholitsch. The disposition was developed jointly by the organ consultants Thomas Rothert and Hans-Eberhard Roß with Beat Grenacher (Goll Orgelbau). Although an individual specification was realised, the tonal design – necessitated by the church’s bass-weak acoustics – consciously follows the organs of Aristide Cavaillé-Coll.

Throughout the year the instrument is used for organ recitals and symphony concerts with organ accompaniment. Numerous commercial recordings have also been made on it.

== Disposition since 1998 ==
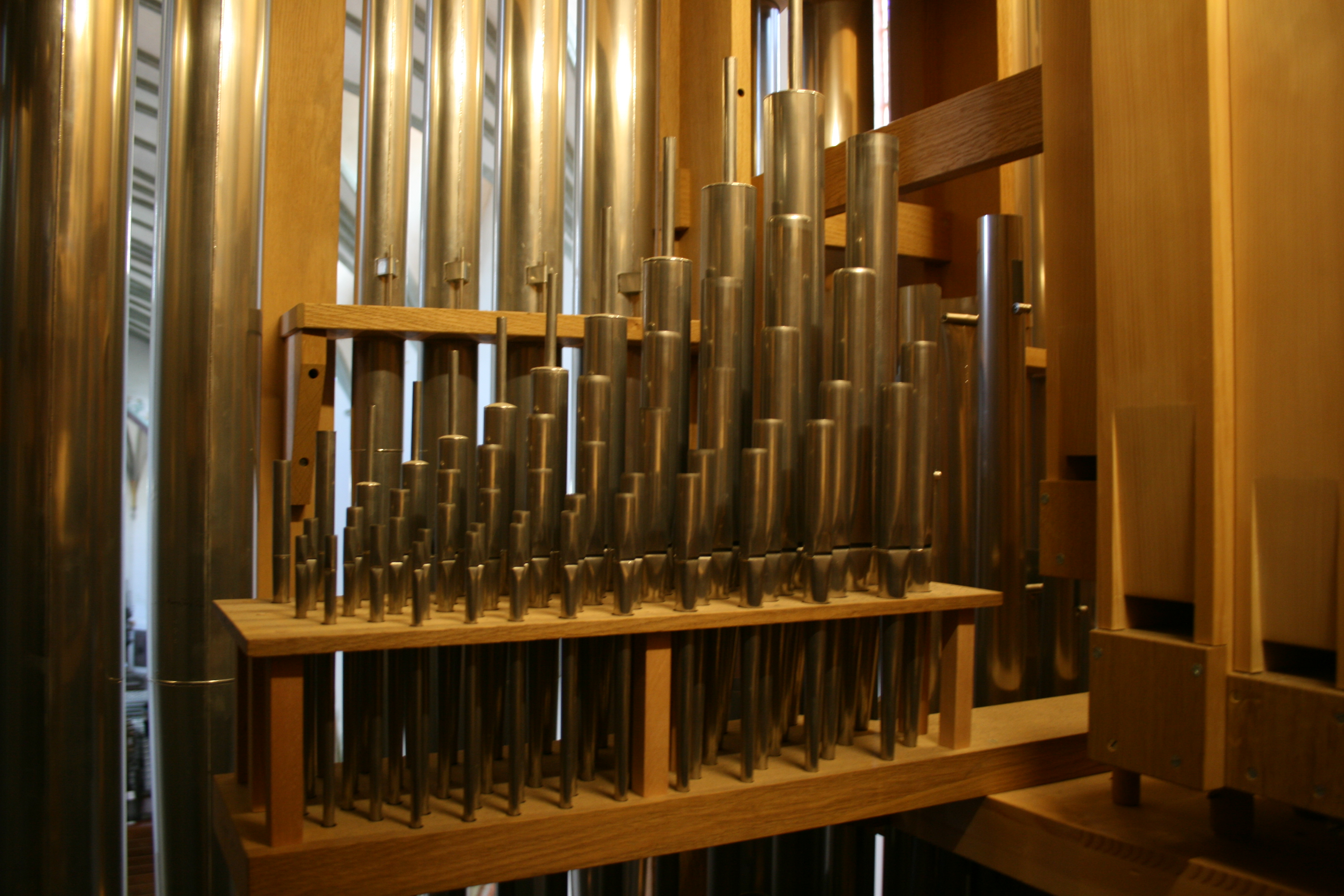
Free-standing cornet

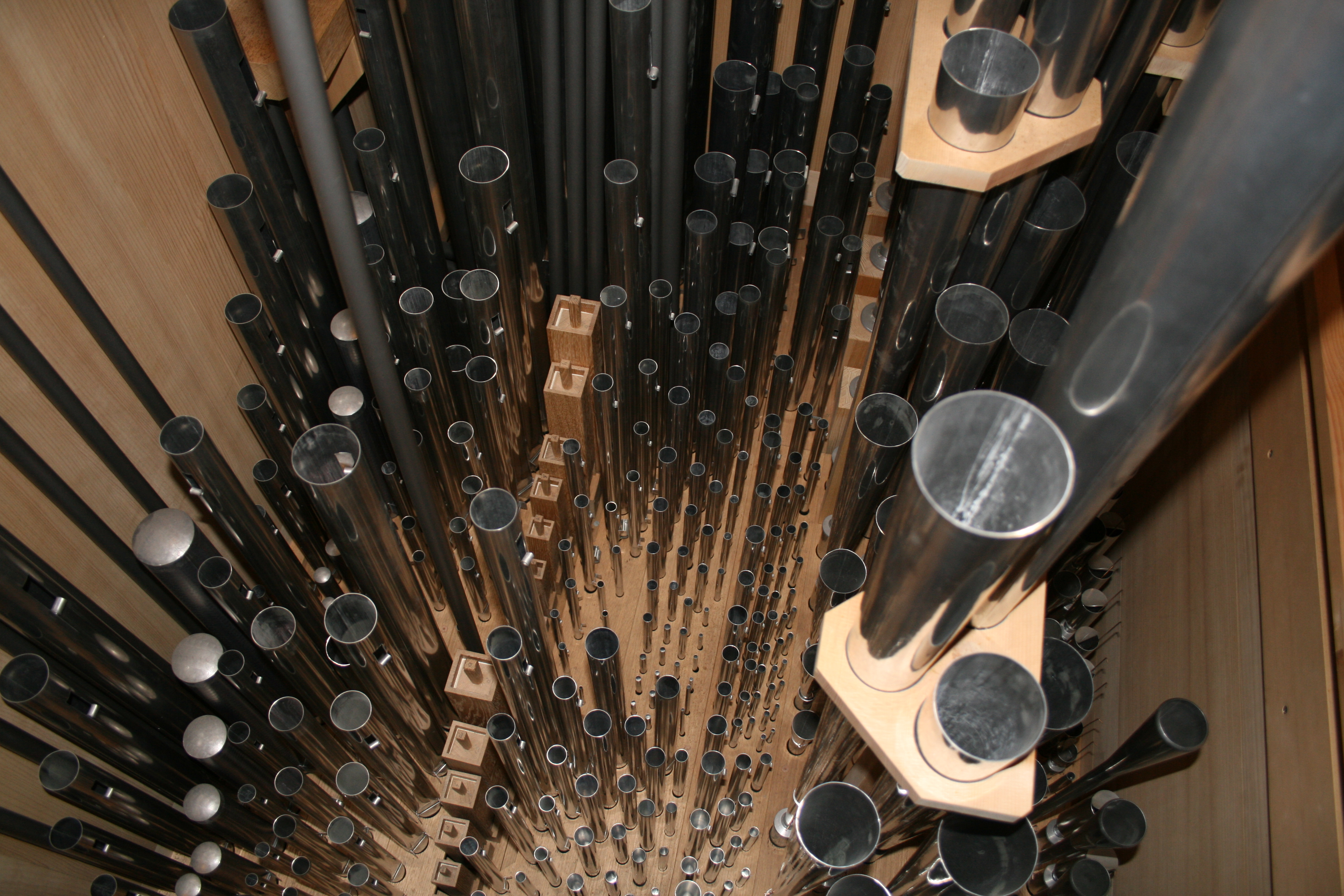
View inside the organ

I Main organ C–c^{4}
1.	Prestant	16′
2.	Principal	8′
3.	Double flute	8′
4.	Pedal	8′
5.	Gambe	8′
6.	Octave	4′
7.	Flute	4′
8.	Quint	2 2/3′
9.	Octave	2′
10.	Mixture IV	1 1/3′
11.	Cymbel IV	1′
12.	Cornett V	8′
13.	Bassoon	16′
14.	Trumpet	8′
15.	Clarin	4′
	Tremblant

II Positive C–c^{4}
16.	Clock	8′
17.	Flûte à fuseau	8′
18.	Salicional	8′
19.	Prestant	4′
20.	Flûte à cheminée	4′
21.	Nasard	2 2/3′
22.	Flageolet	2′
23.	Tierce	1 3/5′
24.	Larigot	1 1/3′
25.	Fourniture IV	1 1/3′
26.	Ranquette	16′
27.	Trumpet	8′
28.	Cromorne	8′
	Tremblant

III Récit C–c^{4}
29.	Bourdon	16′
30.	Diapason	8′
31.	Cor de nuit	8′
32.	Flûte harmonique	8′
33.	Gambe	8′
34.	Voix céleste	8′
35.	Viola	4′
36.	Octave flute	4′
37.	Harmonic nasard	2 2/3′
38.	Octavin	2′
39.	Tierce harmonique	1 3/5′
40.	Piccolo	1′
41.	Plein jeu harm. II–V	2′
42.	Bombarde	16′
43.	Harmonic trumpet	8′
44.	Hautbois	8′
45.	Voix humaine	8′
46.	Harmonic clarion	4′
	Tremblant

IV Solo C–c^{4}
47.	Tuba magna	16′
48.	Tuba mirabilis	8′
49.	Clairon	4′

Pedal C–g^{1}
50.	Grand Bourdon	32′
51.	Contrebasse	16′
52.	Soubasse	16′
53.	Basse	8′
54.	Flûte	8′
55.	Violoncelle	8′
56.	Octave	4′
57.	Fourniture IV	2 2/3′
58.	Contrebombarde	32′
59.	Bombarde	16′
60.	Posaune	16′
61.	Trumpet	8′
62.	Clairon	4′

- Couplers: II/I, III/I, IV/I, III/II, IV/III, I/P, II/P, III/P, IV/P.
- Playing aids: Electronic setter system with sequence switch and floppy disk drive.

== Technical data ==
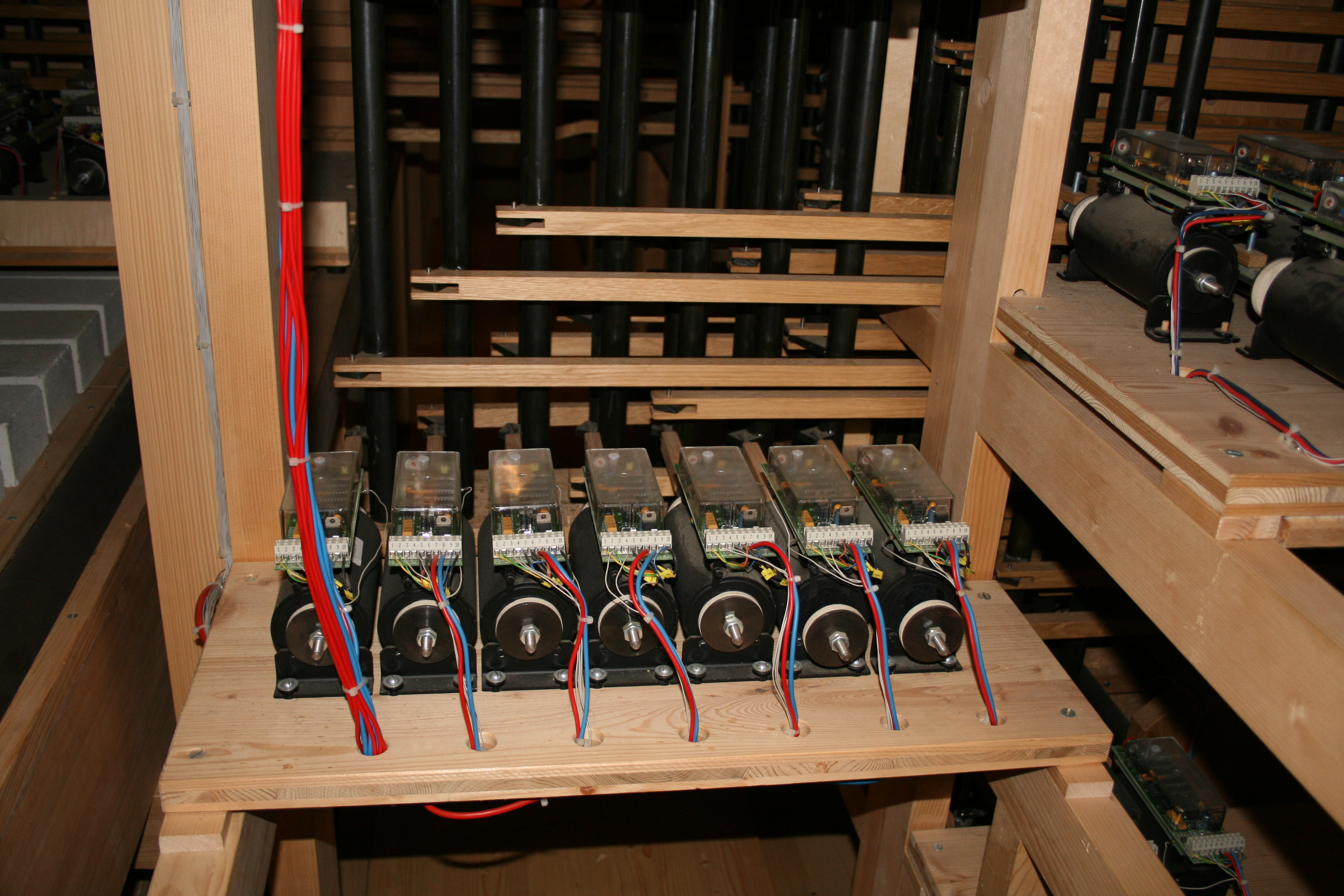
Electric slider solenoids

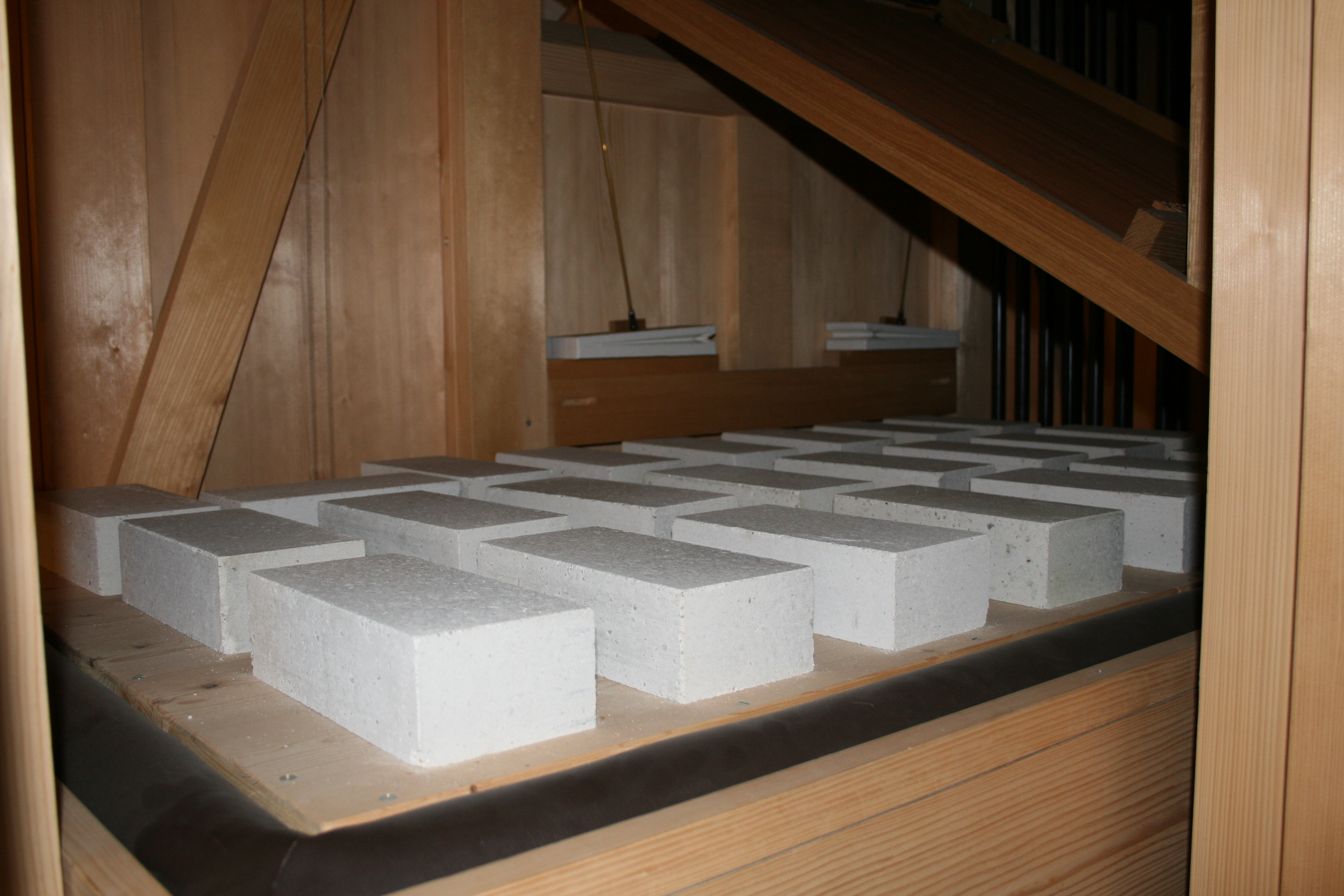
One of the magazine bellows with weights; two of the three tremulants visible at rear right

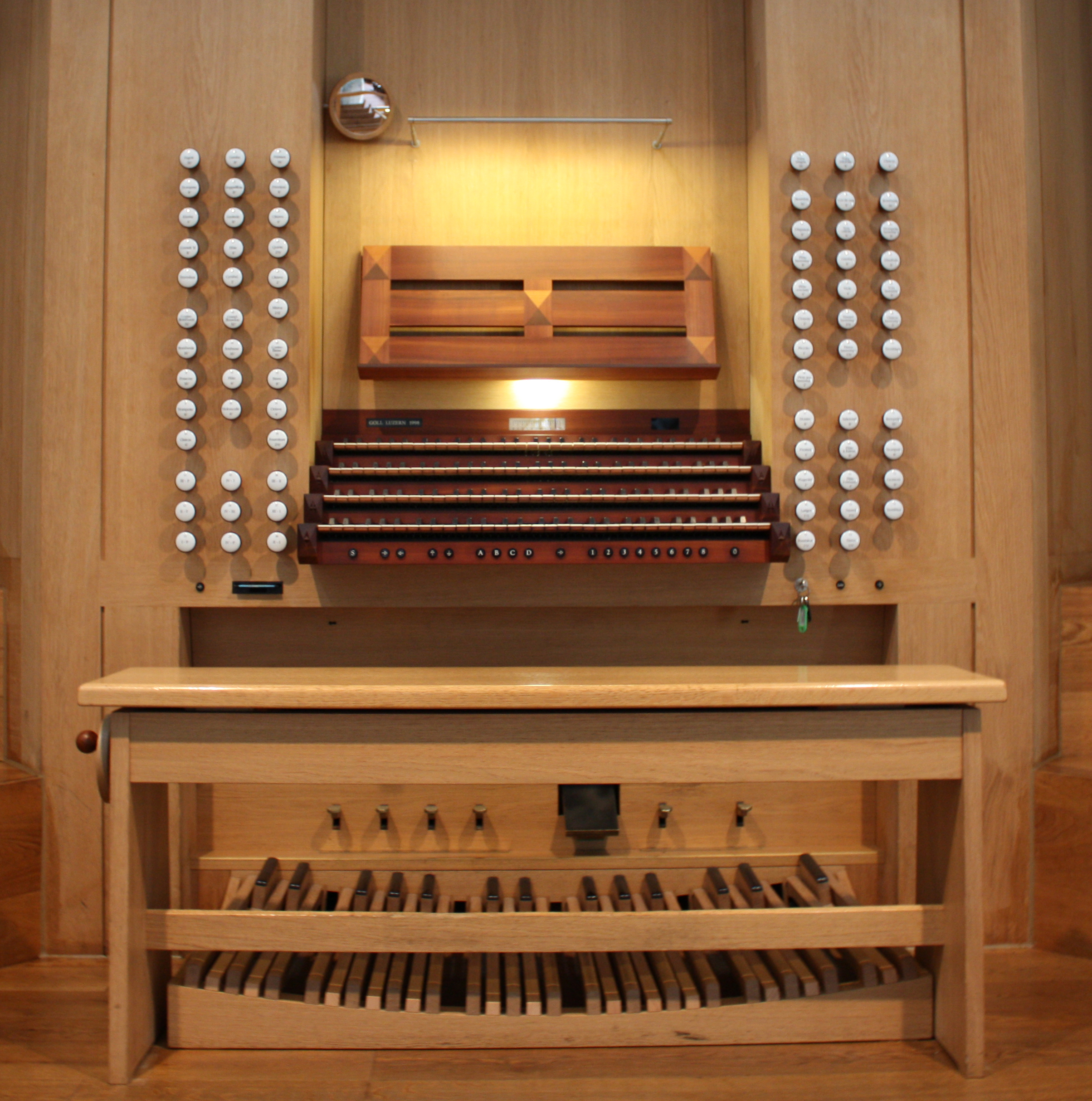
Console of the new organ

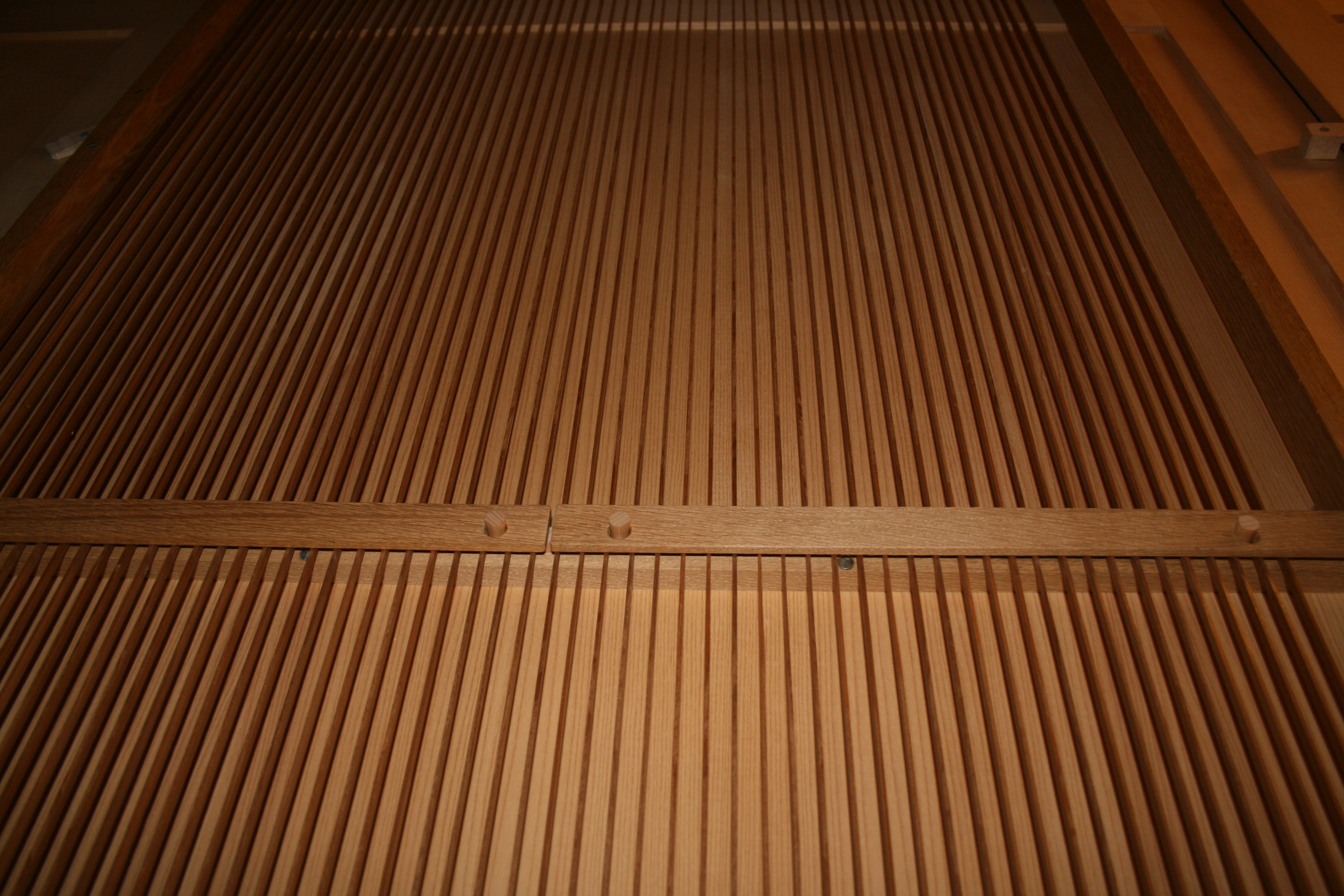
Mechanical key-action trackers

- 62 stops, 82 ranks, 4,285 pipes
- Largest pipe: 4.80 m
- Smallest pipe: 15 mm
- Total weight of the organ: 16,000 kg
- Case/prospect:
- Material: oak
- Height: 13.9 m
- Width: 9.10 m
- Depth: 3.72 m
- Electrical system:
- Voltage: 24 V
- Wind supply:
- Blowers: 2 electric motors
- Air delivery: 28/15 m³, wind pressures 120/135 mm WC
- Bellows: 5 magazine bellows
- Wind pressures:
- Hauptwerk: 80 mm WC
- Positiv: 75 mm WC
- Récit: 90 mm WC
- Solo: 125 mm WC
- Pedal: 80 mm WC
- Console:
- Attached playing cabinet
- Pedalboard: parallel, doubly concave
- Stop knobs: plum wood with inset porcelain labels
- Action:
- Key action: mechanical
- Stop action: mechanical and electric (dual system)
- Pitch and temperament:
- a¹ = 440 Hz at 14 °C
- Equal temperament

== Organists ==
- 1950: Hermann Pauli
- 1958–1990: Rudolf Ellwein (1927–2008)
- Since 1991: Hans-Eberhard Roß (born 1962)

== Recordings/Sound recordings ==
- Tonbeispiel: Charles-Marie Widor: Symphonie pour orgue N° 5, f-Moll, op. 42 Nr. 1 (1887), 5th movement: Toccata (finale)
- Die Goll-Orgel von St. Martin in Memmingen. 1999, Organum OGM 990035, CD (Hans-Eberhard Roß plays Gigout, Franck, Bach, Eben, Vierne, Widor). Also published as Mon orgue c’est mon orchestre.
- Die große Goll-Orgel von St. Martin Memmingen. 1999, IFO records 00045, CD (Hans-Eberhard Roß plays works by Eben, Franck, Pierné, Vièrne, and Bach).
- Jan Welmers – Minimal Music for Organ. 2000, Audite aud 97.474, CD (Markus Goecke).
- Spiritual Movement Nr. 1 an der Goll-Orgel von St. Martin in Memmingen. 2002, Bebab Records Munich, CD (Barbara Dennerlein).
- Petr Eben – Das Orgelwerk Vol. 1. 2002, Motette-Ursina 12911, CD (Gunther Rost plays Eben: Faust, Mutationes).
- Romantic and Virtuoso Works for Organ Vol. 1: Janes Parker-Smith At The Goll Organ Of St. Martin Memmingen. 2003, Avie Records AV 0034, CD (Works by Lanquetuit, Boulnois, Mulet, Jongen, Whitlock, Demessieux, Bowen, and Middelschulte).
- César Franck: Complete Organ Works Vol. 1 – From Prodigy to Composer. 2004, Audite aud 91.518, 2 SACD (Hans-Eberhard Roß).
- César Franck: Complete Organ Works Vol. 2 – Unrecognised Greatness. 2004, Audite aud 91.519, 2 SACD (Hans-Eberhard Roß).
- César Franck: Complete Organ Works Vol. 3 – Fulfilment and Farewell. 2004, Audite aud 91.520, 2 SACD (Hans-Eberhard Roß).
- Phantomes – An Organ Spectacular. 2004, Oehms OC 606, SACD (Harald Feller plays works by Bach, Rossini/Lemare, Vierne, Rota, Williams/Feller, Schneider).
- César Franck. Jean Langlais. 2007, MDG 906 1437-6, SACD (Ulfert Schmidt).
- Marcel Dupré: Les vèpres de la Vierge. 2008, MOT 50854, SACD (Harald Feller (organ), Cantando Praedicare Göttingen under the direction of Johanna Grüger).
- Faszination Orgel 1. 2009, CD (Hans-Eberhard Roß plays works by Bach, Naujalis, Eben, Albéniz, and Widor).
- Gloria. 2009, CD (Hedwig Bilgram (Organ) und Gábor Boldoczki (Trumpet) play works by Bach, Purcell, Albinoni, Handel and Stanley, Caccini and Gounod).
- Memminger Orgelfeuerwerk. 2009, Sonntagsblatt, CD (Hans-Eberhard Roß plays works by Bach, Widor, Boëllmann, Vierne, and Langlais; part of the Sonntagsblatt's organ literature canon).
- Sechs Sinfonien von Louis Vierne. CD, Audite-Verlag, Organist Hans-Eberhard Roß, 2014

== Movie ==
- Faszination Orgel – Die Goll-Orgel von St. Martin Memmingen. 1998, video production by Scholz Memmingen, running time 45 minutes, publisher: Evangelical Lutheran Parish of St. Martin's Church in Memmingen; film excerpts.

== Bibliography ==
- Hermann Fischer, Theodor Wohnhaas: Die Orgeln von St. Martin in Memmingen. In memory of Walter Braun (1905–1977). In: Memminger Geschichtsblätter 1987/1988. Memminger Zeitung Verlagsdruckerei, 1990, ISSN 0539-2896, pp. 7–25.
- Hans-Eberhard Roß: Symphonik im gotischen Gewand: Die neue Goll-Orgel von St. Martin in Memmingen. In: Orgel International. Freiburg 1999, pp. 404–407.
- Hans-Eberhard Roß: Die Goll-Orgel von St. Martin in Memmingen. In: Franz Josef Stoiber (Ed.): Schöne Orgeln. Baugeschichte – Klang – Prospektgestaltung (= 283. Veröffentlichung der Gesellschaft der Orgelfreunde). Figaro, Laaber 2019, ISBN 978-3-946798-17-0, pp. 172–179.
- Wolfram Wienhold: Die neue Goll-Orgel von St. Martin in Memmingen. In: Die Auslese. Volume 41, Issue 4, 1999, pp. 6–8.
- Die Orgel der Memminger St.-Martins-Kirche. In: Ars Organi. Volume 49. Mettlach 2001, pp. 112–113.
- Neue Goll-Orgel St. Martin Memmingen. In: Forum Kirchenmusik. Munich 1999, S. 103–104.
- Johannes Hoyer: Wo man die Musik pflanzelt. In: Materialien zur Memminger Stadtgeschichte Reihe B: Forschungen. Memmingen City Archives, 2001, ISSN 1438-7336.
