= Marie Jaëll =

French pianist and composer

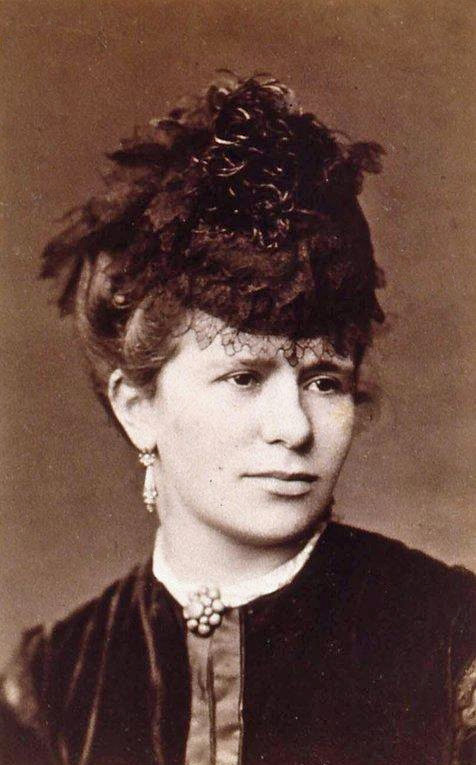
Marie Jaëll

Marie Jaëll (née Trautmann) (17 August 1846, Steinseltz – 4 February 1925, Paris) was a French pianist, composer, and pedagogue. Marie Jaëll composed pieces for piano, concertos, quartets, and others, She dedicated her cello concerto to Jules Delsart, and was the first pianist to perform all the piano sonatas of Beethoven in Paris. She did scientific studies of hand techniques in piano playing and attempted to replace traditional drilling with systematic piano methods. Her students included Albert Schweitzer, who studied with her while also studying organ with Charles-Marie Widor in 1898–99. She died in Paris.

== Early life and education ==
Her father was the mayor of Steinseltz in Alsace, and her mother was a lover of the arts. She began piano studies at the age of six and by seven, she was studying under piano pedagogues F.B. Hamma and Ignaz Moscheles in Stuttgart. Marie's mother served as her advocate and manager. A year after she began lessons with Hamma and Moscheles, she gave concerts in Germany and Switzerland.

In 1856, the ten-year-old Marie was introduced to the piano teacher Heinrich Herz at the Paris Conservatory. After just four months as an official student at the Conservatory, she won the First Prize of Piano. Her performances were recognized by the public and local newspapers; the Revue et gazette musicale printed a review on July 27, 1862, that reads: "She marked it [the piece] with the seal of her individual nature. Her higher mechanism, her beautiful style, her play deliciously moderate, with an irreproachable purity, an exquisite taste, a lofty elegance, constantly filled the audience with wonder."

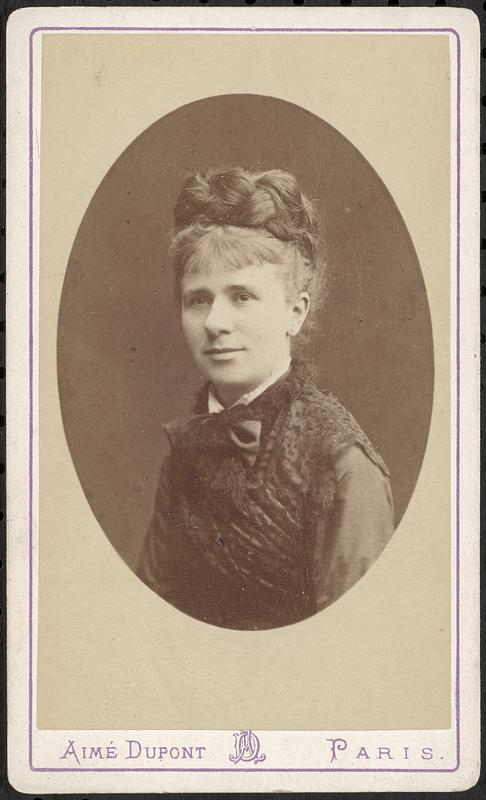
M. Jaëll, ca. 1859-September 1875; from the Alexandre Benois Collection of the Boston Public Library

On August 9, 1866, at twenty years of age, Marie married the Austrian concert pianist Alfred Jaëll. She was then known variously as Marie Trautmann, Marie Jaëll, Marie Jaëll Trautmann or Marie Trautmann Jaëll. Alfred was fifteen years older than Marie and had, according to one source, been a student of Frédéric Chopin. The husband and wife team performed popular pieces, duos, solos, and compositions of their own throughout Europe and Russia. As a pianist, Marie specialized in the music of Schumann, Liszt, and Beethoven. They transcribed Beethoven's "Marcia alla Turca" from The Ruins of Athens for piano; the score was successfully published in 1872.

Alfred was able to use his success and fame to help Marie meet with various composers and performers throughout their travels. In 1868, Marie met the composer and pianist Franz Liszt. A record of Liszt's comments about Marie survives in an article published in the American Record Guide: "[Marie Jaëll] has the brains of a philosopher and the fingers of an artist." Liszt introduced Marie to other great composers and performers of the day—for example, Johannes Brahms and Anton Rubinstein. By 1871, Marie's compositions began to be published.

With the death of her husband in 1882, Marie had the opportunity to study with Liszt in Weimar, and with Camille Saint-Saëns and César Franck in Paris. Saint-Saëns dedicated his Piano Concerto No. 1 and the "Étude en forme de valse" to her. Saint-Saëns thought highly enough of Marie to introduce her to the Société des compositeurs de musique —a great honor for women in those days.

== Compositions and reviews ==
The New Grove Dictionary of Music states that Marie "composed piano pieces and songs which, though essentially Romantic, reveal an assimilation of the innovations of the time." The American Record Guide lists Marie's compositional approach as "romantic in style, with more flavor of the salon than the concert hall."

Marie was well respected, both as a performer and a composer, by her contemporaries. Lea Schmidt-Roger states "Four-handed literature was as much a part of Jaëll's repertory as solo literature. She concertized with duo piano and four-handed pieces from the age of fourteen, and later she and husband Alfred transcribed and performed much of the contemporary four-handed literature."

Marie drew inspiration for her piece "Harmonies d'Alsace" from her childhood memories. She wrote pieces for cello, piano, orchestra, quartets, etc. Marie's variety of compositions extended to a symphonic poem, "Ossiane," which was based on the poems of Jean Richepin and Victor Hugo. She wrote a number of vocal pieces and an opera, Runea.

BBC Radio 3 featured her as Composer of the Week, first transmitted August–September 2020, repeated 10–14 July 2023. A CD of her chamber music, including the four movement Piano Quartet in G minor (1875) and the Ballade for piano and violin (1886), was issued in 2026.

== Physiology research and Jaëll Method ==
After struggling with tendonitis, Jaëll began to study neuroscience. The strain on her playing and performing led her to research physiology. Jaëll studied a wide variety of subjects pertaining to the functioning of the body, and also ventured into psychology: "She wanted to combine the emotional and spiritual act of creating beautiful music with the physiological aspects of tactile, additive, and visual sensory."

Dr. Charles Féré assisted Jaëll in her research of physiology. Her studies included how music affects the connection between mind and body, as well as how to apply this knowledge to intelligence and sensitivity in teaching music. Liszt's music had such a tremendous influence on Jaëll that she sought to gain as much insight into his methods and techniques as possible. This research and study led to Jaëll creating her own teaching method based on her findings.

Jaëll's teaching method was known as the 'Jaëll Method'. Her method was created through a process of trial and error with herself and her students. Jaëll's goal was for her students to feel a deep connection to the piano. An eleven-book series on piano technique resulted from her research and experience. Piano pedagogues have since drawn insight into teaching techniques of the hand from her method and books. In fact, her method is still in use today.

As a result of her studies, Jaëll was able to compile her extensive research into a technique book entitled L'intelligence et le rythme dans les mouvements artistiques. This text is used by pianists and piano pedagogues as a reference, specifically with hand position and playing techniques.

== Selected list of compositions ==
Jaëll composed over eighty works, including concerti, solo pieces for piano, chamber works, and choral and vocal music.

- Am Grabe eines Kindes - 3 choirs.
- Ballade, pour piano et violon (1886)
- Ce qu'on entend dans l'Enfer, le Purgatoire
- Cello Concerto in F major, dedicated to Jules Delsart (1882)
- Dans un rêve, pour violon, violoncelle et piano (c. 1881)
- Harmonies d'Alsace - orchestra.
- Impromptu, 2 Meditations, 6 Petits morceaux, 10 Bagatelles - intermediate pieces for the piano.
- La Légende des Ours - soprano and piano.
- Les Orientales - voice.
- Ossiane - voice and orchestra.
- Le Paradis - large work for piano.
- Piano Concerto No. 1 in D minor, dedicated to Camille Saint-Saëns (1877)
- Piano Concerto No. 2 in C minor, dedicated to Eugen d'Albert (1884)
- Psalm LXV - choir in four parts, dedicated to Monsieur Alfred Jaëll, unpublished.
- Quatuor avec piano en Sol mineur (1875)
- Romance pour violon avec accompagnement de piano (1882)
- Runea - opera.
- Sonate pour violon.
- Sphinx - for piano, dedicated to Saint-Saëns, published in 1885.
- Sur la tombe d'un enfant - chorus and orchestra.
- Valses pour piano á quatre mains, Op. 8 - piano four-hands.
- Valses Mélancoliques and Valses Mignonnes - solo pieces for intermediate piano.
- Voix du Printemps - piano four-hands.

== Writings ==
- Le toucher, enseignement du piano ... basé sur la physiologie (Paris, 1895)
- La musique et la psychophysiologie (Paris, 1896)
- Le mécanisme du toucher (Paris, 1897)
- Les rythmes du regard et la dissociation des doigts (Paris, 1901)
- L’intelligence et le rythme dans les mouvements artistiques (Paris, 1904)
- Un nouvel état de conscience: la coloration des sensations tactiles (Paris, 1910)
- La résonance du toucher et la topographie des pulpes (Paris, 1912)
- Nouvel enseignement musical et manuel basé sur la découverte des boussoles tonales (Paris, 1922)
- Le toucher musical par l’éducation de la main (Paris, 1927)
- La main et la pensée musicale (Paris, 1927)
