= Paul Bazelaire =

French cellist and composer

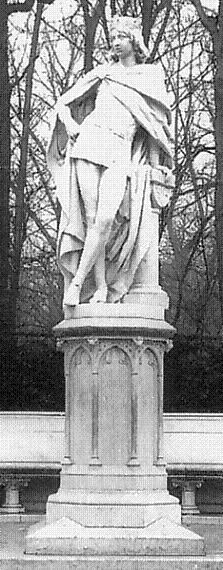
- Statue du sculpteur August Kraus, représentant Henry II, Margrave of Brandenburg-Stendal on the Siegesallee (la Siegesallee) in Berlin. The face is that of Paul Bazelaire aged 13
- Born: 4 March 1886; Sedan
- Died: 11 December 1958 (aged 72); Paris
- Occupation(s): composer Cellist

Paul Bazelaire (4 March 1886 – 11 December 1958) was a French cellist and composer.

Bazelaire was born in Sedan, Ardennes. He studied under Jules Delsart.

He won many prizes for literature and poetry in France and Belgium.
