= Louis Feuillard =

French professor

Louis Feuillard (20 June 1872 - 18 September 1941) was a French professor at the Conservatoire de Paris, a chamber musician and a string quartet cellist. He was a student of Jules Delsart.

He was recognized for his instinct of education mainly as a professor of the famous cellist Paul Tortelier. His Exercises journaliers (Daily exercises) cover the most important aspects of cello technique, such as neck and thumb exercises and bow exercises. It is in particular because of the logical structure of the exercises that they have entered the standard learning of the cello since their publication in 1919. In addition to his Daily Exercises, Feuillard is known for his Etudes du Jeune Violoncelliste (Studies of the young cellist) and eight volumes of pedagogical methodology, La Technic du Violoncelle. Feuillard's contributions to cello pedagogy additionally include may arrangements, transcriptions, and editions, most notably, arrangement of the Ševčík Bowing Variations for cello.

Feuillard dedicated his life to teaching. He never married, nor had children of his own. When he died in 1941, he left his home and belongings to his housekeeper of forty years, Alphonsine. This was much to the dismay of his closest living relatives, two cousins, who were left to pay for his funeral expenses.
