= Jules Delsart =

French cellist (1844–1900)

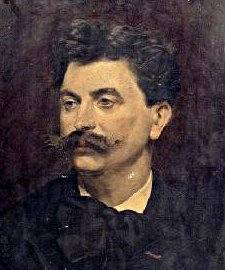
Jules Delsart, portrait by Julien Decle

Jules Delsart (24 November 1844 – 3 July 1900) was a French cellist and teacher. He is best known for his arrangement for cello and piano of César Franck's Violin Sonata in A major. Musicologist Lynda MacGregor described Delsart as "one of the foremost French cellists of the period, with faultless technique, a precise bow and a sweet, though not large, tone." He was the owner of the 1689 'Archinto' Stradivari.

== Life and career ==
Born in Valenciennes in 1844, Delsart began his studies at the Académie de Musique in his native city before transferring to the Conservatoire de Paris, where he earned a First Prize in cello performance in 1866. His principal teacher was Auguste Franchomme, whom he succeeded as professor of cello at the Conservatoire upon Franchomme's death in 1884. He remained in that position for the rest of his life. His students included Paul Bazelaire, Horace Britt, Marcel Casadesus, Louis Feuillard, Louis Fournier, Víctor Mirecki Larramat, Henri Mulet, and Georges Papin.

Following his graduation from the Paris Conservatoire, Delsart embarked on several successful tours throughout Europe. On 26 February 1881 he premiered in the Salle Pleyel the cello sonata of Marie Jaëll, with the composer playing the piano. In 1882 she dedicated her cello concerto to him. He made numerous appearances in London, including performing in the world premiere of David Popper's Requiem for three cellos and orchestra alongside the composer and Edward Howell as his fellow cellists at St James's Hall on 25 November 1891. In 1892, at La Trompette, accompanied by Louis Breitner, he premiered Chant saphique, Op. 91, a piece for cello and piano by Camille Saint-Saëns, which was dedicated to him. Other works dedicated to Delsart included David Popper's Nocturne, Léon Boëllmann's Cello Sonata, and Benjamin Godard's On the Lake.

Delsart was also active as a chamber musician. From 1875, along with the founder Martin Pierre Marsick, Louis van Waefelghem and Guillaume Rémy, he was the cellist of the Quatuor Marsick, one of the best and most famous string quartets in Paris of the time. With André Messager and Guillaume Rémy, he played in a piano trio which premiered Ernest Chausson's Trio in G minor, Op. 3, in 1882. He also played in a trio led by Pablo de Sarasate.

In addition to the cello, Delsart occasionally performed on the viola da gamba, which he began studying in 1887. His interest in this instrument led him to found the Société des Instruments Anciens (SIA) with Louis Diémer (harpsichord), van Waefelghem (viola d'amore) and Grillet (vielle) in 1889. The SIA performed successfully throughout Europe for a decade, although Delsart was only a member during its early years. He was succeeded in the Société by two of his pupils, Papin and Casadesus.

Delsart died in Paris in 1900, aged 55, and was buried at Père Lachaise Cemetery. During his lifetime, his portrait was painted by Jean-André Rixens and Julien Decle; both paintings are in the Musée des Beaux Arts, Valenciennes. There is a Rue Jules Delsart in Valenciennes.

== Arrangements ==
Delsart's arrangement for cello and piano of César Franck's Violin Sonata in A major was sanctioned by the composer, and has become a standard part of the cello repertoire. After thorough historical study based on reliable documents, Delsart's transcription for cello (the piano part remains the same as in the violin sonata) was published by G. Henle Verlag as Urtext edition. He also arranged for cello and piano the "Méditation" from Massenet's Thaïs (normally played by violin and orchestra); and Fauré's Three Romances sans paroles, Op. 17, for piano.
