= William Henry Squire =

British cellist, composer and music professor

William Henry Squire, ARCM (8 August 1871 – 17 March 1963) was a British cellist, composer and music professor of the late 19th and early 20th centuries. He studied cello at the Royal College of Music, and became professor of cello at the Royal College and Guildhall schools of music.

Squire was principal cello in several major London orchestras and helped to popularize the cello as a solo instrument in the early years of the 20th century by giving public concerts throughout the British Isles and making recordings. He became well known for his performances of the Elgar and Saint-Saëns cello concertos.

In 1898, the French composer Gabriel Fauré dedicated his cello piece Sicilienne to Squire. Squire's own compositions were written mainly for the cello; these included several solo pieces of light character and a cello concerto; he also wrote the music for a number of songs.

One of Squire's legacies is a collection of student-level works for cello and piano which appear in string teaching syllabuses all over the world including those of the Associated Board of the Royal Schools of Music, the Internet Cello Society and the Suzuki method of string instrument teaching.

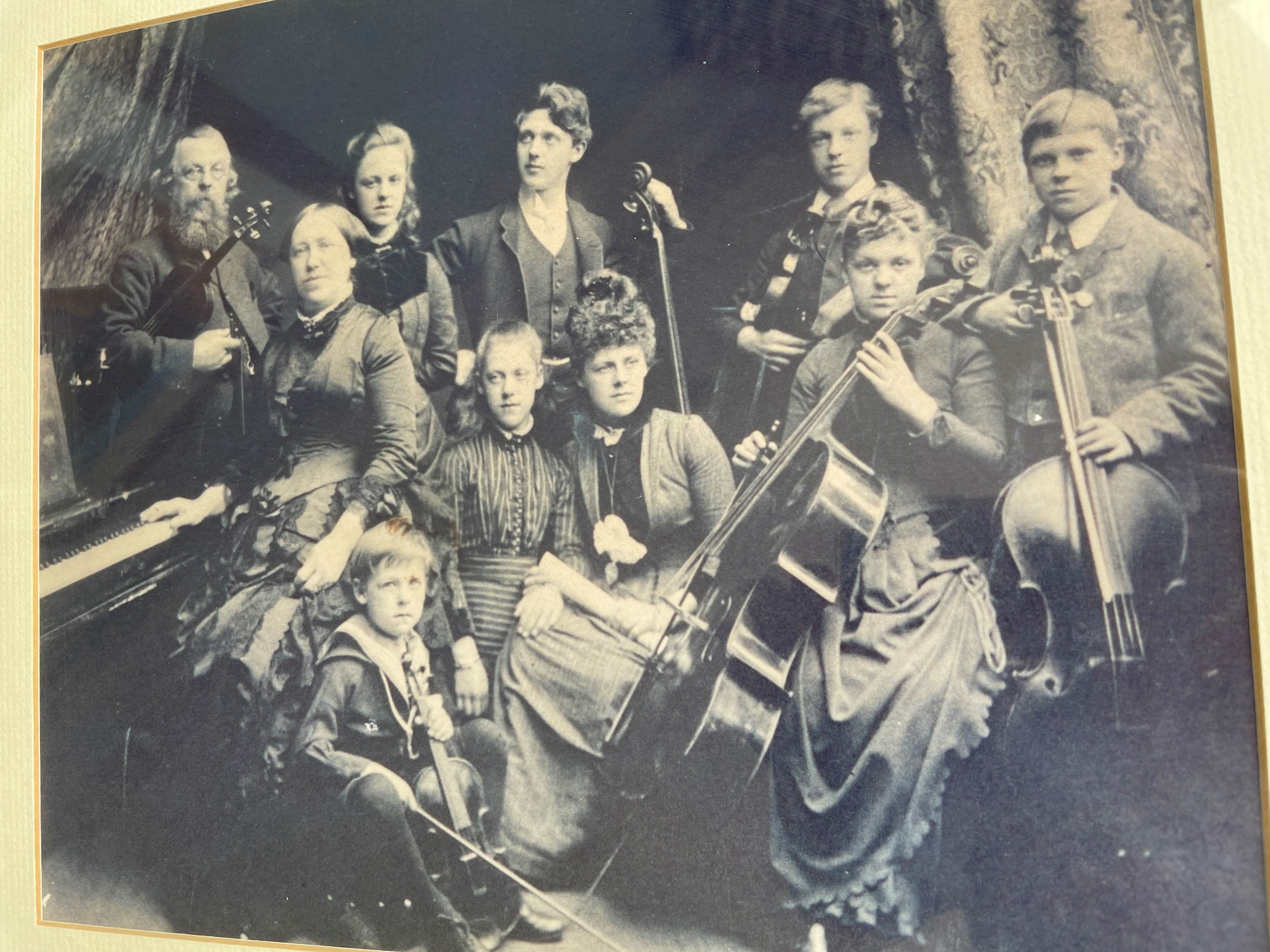
Squire family photo

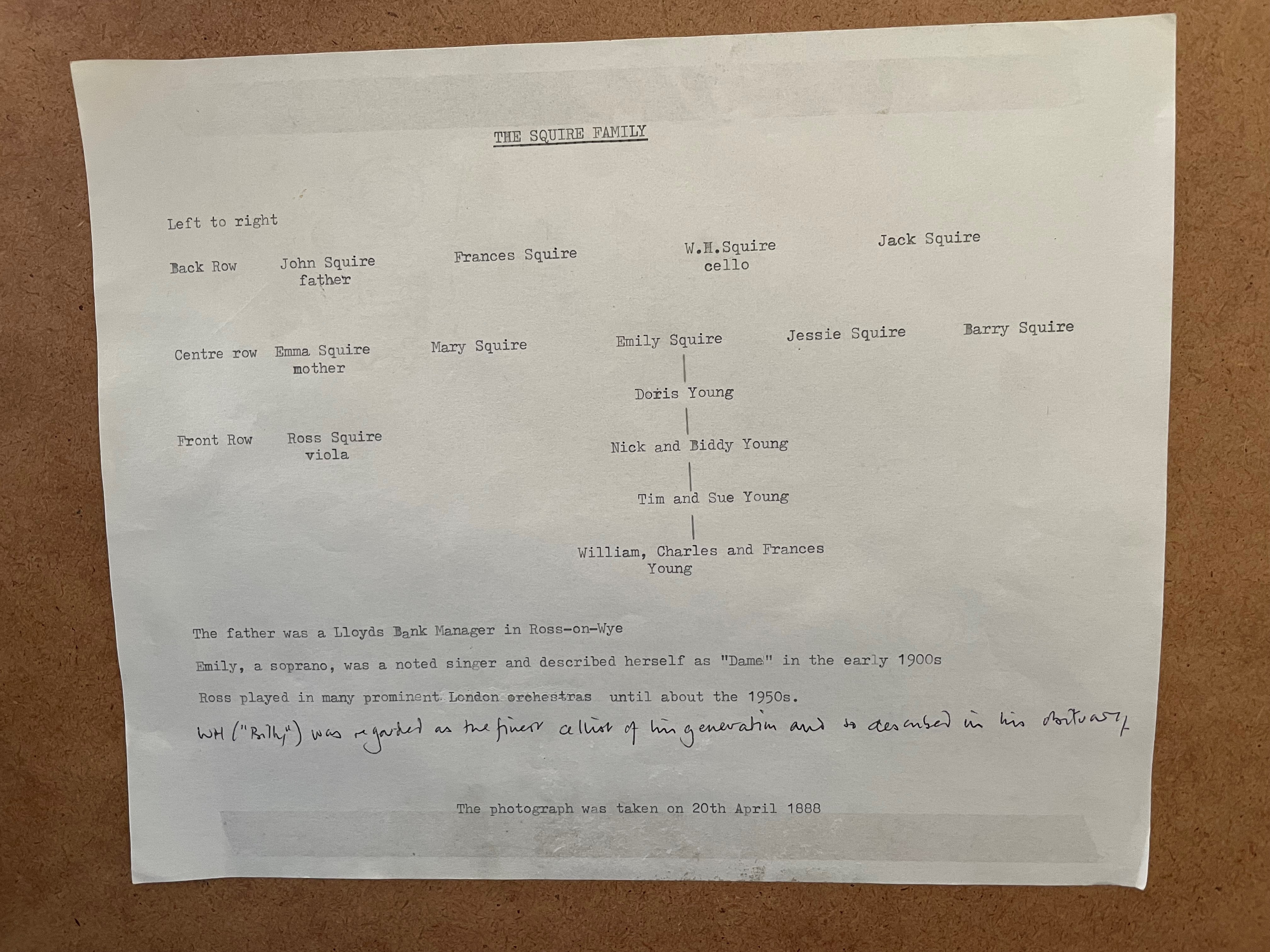
Squire family photo – names / key

== Early life ==
William Henry Squire was born in Ross-on-Wye, Herefordshire, England, UK in 1871. He was the son of John Squire, a banker and gifted amateur violinist, and his wife Emma Fisher. He had his first music lessons from his father and at five was encouraged to take up the cello to complete the family quartet.

There were eight children in this very musical family including his sister, Emily Squire, the eldest (born 1867), who played the viola and went on to become a successful soprano singer and his brother the violinist Charles Barré Squire (born 1881). He made his first public appearance as a solo cellist at the age of six in the town hall at Kingsbridge in Devon where the family had moved. He was educated at Kingsbridge Grammar School. In 1883 at the age of twelve he gained a cello scholarship at the Royal College of Music. There, he studied cello under Edward Howell, chamber music with Henry Holmes and composition under Parry; he was also taught by both Stanford and Fred Bridge. He had occasional lessons with the cellist Piatti.

His study at the Royal College was extended for a further three years and on leaving in 1889 he was elected an associate (ARCM). He married his wife Marion S. Warren (of Bradninch in Devon) in 1899.

== Playing career ==
Squire made his debut at a chamber music concert given by Albéniz at St. James's Hall in London on 12 February 1891. He was associated with the concerts of British chamber music which were given at the Queen's Hall, London in 1894. On 20 April 1895 he appeared at the Crystal Palace in London to play the Saint-Saëns cello concerto in A. He was appointed principal cello at the Royal Italian Opera (now the Royal Opera House Covent Garden) between 1894 and 1899. As a prominent member of the original Queen's Hall Orchestra from 1897 to 1901 he played in some of the earliest Henry Wood Promenade Concerts; there he performed in some of his own compositions, for example Serenade in 1897 and pieces by other composers, for example the Andante from the cello concerto in D major Op. 45 No. 2 by Molique in 1898. Henry Wood said, of Squire:

Squire was, of course, a very young man in those days, but his tone and technique were superb. He was a great acquisition to the orchestra and a favourite with audiences.

Squire also performed quartets with other members of the Queen's Hall Orchestra in the Queen's Small Hall. It was in 1898, while at the Queen's Hall, that Fauré, impressed with Squire's mastery of French music dedicated his Sicilienne Op. 78 for cello and piano to him.

Squire also played in the London Symphony Orchestra. In 1899, he performed the Schubert Quintet in an ensemble led by the violinist Joseph Joachim. Squire played at several other London venues including the London Ballad Concerts which were held at the Royal Albert Hall, Hampstead Popular Concerts, the National Sunday League Concerts held at the London Palladium and at the Aeolian Hall.

For nine successive years in the early 20th century, Squire made frequent concert tours of the provinces as a soloist with the contralto singer Clara Butt and her husband, the baritone Kennerley Rumford. During this same period Squire was also associated with the music festivals held at Leeds and Norwich, and Hereford, Worcester and Gloucester (the Three Choirs Festival). He played in trios with William Murdoch (piano) and Albert Sammons (violin) – the "London Chamber Music Players", and Frederick Sewell (piano) and Johannes Wolff (violin).

His performance schedule remained busy until the late 1920s by which time the limited number of prestigious concert dates became shared between a growing number of cellists. In October 1941 he made his last appearance in a public concert at the Festival of Arts in Exeter Cathedral. He also appeared before royalty on many occasions.

Squire's style of playing has been described as "of the old school" as he was taught by Piatti. In a comparison with the cellist Pablo Casals of the number of portamenti used in the first twenty-six bars of the slow movement of the Elgar cello concerto, Squire has been described as using twenty-three portamenti (in his 1930 recording) compared to only ten used by Casals (recorded in 1945). In addition, Squire's portamenti have been described as "slow and unsoftened by diminuendi" [sic]; Casals's as "extremely varied and subtle".

Squire is said to have played a cello by Bergonzi, but there is an alternative view that he played a Matteo Goffriller.

== Academic career ==
Squire was professor of cello at the Royal College of Music in London between 1898 and 1917. From 1911 to 1917, he was professor at the Guildhall School of Music in London. He was an examiner for the Royal Academy of Music in London and also adjudicated at various music festivals. He was an adjudicator for the Associated Board of the Royal Schools of Music submitting some of his own pieces for the syllabuses. Among his pupils were the cellists Cedric Sharpe (1891–1978), Marie Dare and Colin Hampton (1911–1996).

Between 1926 and November 1953, he was director of the Performing Rights Society becoming 1st honorary member of the General Council from November 1953 onwards.

== Compositions ==
By the late 1890s, when Squire was employed by the Queen's Hall Orchestra, he was already busy publishing a great deal of cello and piano music. He preferred to write small-scale works for one or two performers most likely written for cello students or for his own performances at London concert halls. He is not known to have written any large scale works such as symphonies, operas, cantatas, or ballets. His pieces for cello and piano can almost entirely be characterized as light, short "character pieces".

One of Squire's legacies is a collection of student-level works for cello and piano which appear in string teaching syllabuses all over the world including those of the Associated Board of the Royal Schools of Music, the Internet Cello Society and the Suzuki method of string instrument teaching (cello books 5 and 6).

Squire's compositions fall into four categories: orchestral pieces (including a cello concerto and two unpublished operettas), smaller pieces for solo instruments and piano, music for songs and arrangements of the music of other composers. Several of his pieces were premiered at London's Henry Wood Promenade Concerts with Squire himself often performing the solo cello part.

=== Cello concerto ===
Several sources maintain that Squire wrote a cello concerto, but there is an alternative view that this was an arrangement of a Handel Concerto in G minor which was originally written for oboe. In 1897 Brown and Stratton stated that the concerto was performed in a concert given at the Royal College of Music; so it therefore must have been both written and performed prior to this date. There is no known score for a cello concerto written by Squire which exists today.

=== Orchestral pieces ===
Squire's known orchestral pieces are listed below with Opus numbers and composition dates where known and Promenade concert dates where relevant:

Two operettas (unpublished), Serenade for Flute Clarinet and Strings Op. 15, Sweet Briar (Proms premiere 24 September 1898), The Yeomanry Patrol March (premiered on the first night of the Proms 25 August 1900), Entr'actes Summer Dreams (Proms. premiere 4 September 1897), The Idyll, Sylvania, The Jolly Sailor March, The Waltz, Lazy-Lane.

=== Solo instrumental pieces ===
Most of Squire's solo instrumental pieces were written for the cello – an exception being Calma de Mare which was written for the mandolin. All known solo cello pieces written by Squire are listed below. Many of these were also arranged for other instrumental combinations, for example L'Adieu was arranged for cello harp and organ for a Proms premiere with Squire playing solo cello for the last night of the Proms on 16 October 1897. Cello pieces are with piano accompaniment unless otherwise stated. Opus numbers and composition dates are shown where known and Promenade concert dates where relevant:

Gavotte Humoristique Op. 6, Dreaming (Op. 7), Serenade Op. 15 (Proms premiere 26 September 1895), Petits Morceaux Op. 16 Nos. 1–5 (Triste, Joyeuse, Le Plaisir, Le Bonheur, L'innocence), Twelve Easy Exercises for Cello Op. 18, Minuet Op. 19 No. 3, Chant D'amour, Gondoliera Op. 20 Book 1 No. 2, Souvenir or Reverie Op. 20 Book 1 No. 3, Légende Op. 20 Book 2 No. 1, Berceuse Op. 20 Book 2 No. 3 (Proms premiere 16 September 1897 with Squire playing cello), Danse Rustique Op. 20 Book 2 No. 5, Chansonette Op. 22 (Proms premiere 10 September 1897 with Squire playing cello), Tarantella in D minor Op. 23, Bourrée Op. 24, Meditation in C Op. 25, Humoresque Op. 26, Six Morceaux Melodiques Nos. 1–6 (Canzonetta, Danse Orientale, Elegie, Madrigal, Idylle, Harlequinade).

Romance, Consolation (Proms premiere 24 September 1902), Gavotte Sentimentale, L'Adieu (Proms premiere 16 October 1897 with Squire playing cello), Larghetto in D, Old Swedish Air, Tzig-Tzig (Proms premiere 13 October 1898 with Squire playing cello), Prière, Slumber Song / Entr'acte (Proms premiere 16 September 1899 with Squire playing cello), Rêve D'Amour (Proms premiere 13 October 1898 with Squire playing cello), Madrigal in G.

=== Songs ===
Squire collaborated with well-known lyricists of his day, for example Frederic Weatherly. A selection of some of Squire's songs are listed below with lyricists and composition dates where known and Promenade concert dates where relevant:

"A Chip of the Old Block" [sic] (Harold Simpson 1908), "A Sergeant of the Line" (Frederic Weatherly 1909), "Beloved of Clara Butt", "The Corporal's Ditty" (Francis Barron 1906), "If I Might Only Come to You" (Frederic Weatherly 1916), "If You Were Here", "In an Old Fashioned Town" (Ada Leonora Harris 1914), "Just a Ray of Sunlight" (Mary Amoore), "Lighterman Tom" (Francis Barron 1907 – bass baritone and piano Proms premiere 28 September 1907), "Like Stars Above" (J. A. McDonald 1902 – tenor and piano Proms premiere 29 September 1903), "The Moonlit Road", "Mountain Lovers" (Frederic Weatherly 1908 – tenor and piano Proms premiere 24 August 1909), "My Prayer" (P. J. O'Reilly 1919, also arranged for chorus), "Pals", "The Road that Leads to You" (L. Cooke), "The Singing Lesson – a Duet" (C. Aveling 1906), "The Watchman" (Edward Teschemacher 1909 – bass and piano Proms premiere 6 September 1910), "When You Come Home" (Frederic Weatherly 1912 – contralto and piano Proms premiere 2 September 1913), "The Token" (baritone and piano Proms premiere 14 September 1911), "Three for Jack" (Frederic Weatherly 1904 – soprano and piano Proms premiere 28 September 1905), "Unforgotten" (mezzo and piano Proms premiere 31 October 1900).

=== Arrangements ===
Squire arranged the music of other composers and popular songs of the day for the cello, for example Musette by Offenbach which he performed at one of the London Ballad Concerts in March 1915; he also arranged the music of Chopin, Bach and others.

== Recordings ==
In 1898 the producer and recording engineer Fred Gaisberg set up the first recording studio for the Gramophone Company (soon to become the Gramophone and Typewriter Ltd (G&T), the forerunner of His Master's Voice) at Maiden Lane in London; he started recording 7-inch Berliner discs there during August of that year. Squire was the first instrumentalist of national repute to record on this new medium – recording Simple Aveu, Op. 25 by Thomé on 2 November 1898. He continued recording cello miniatures throughout the 1900s for G&T, for example Mélodie by Anton Rubinstein in January 1906. He played cello obligato on many vocal recordings, for example in "A Summer Night" (by Arthur Thomas) sung by the contralto Louise Kirkby Lunn for His Master's Voice in 1911. He also recorded his arrangements of other composers' works and one of his own pieces: Serenade (in 1911) for His Master's Voice.

In 1926 Squire recorded the Saint-Saëns cello concerto No.1 in A minor Op. 33 for Columbia with the Hallé orchestra conducted by Hamilton Harty. He recorded the Elgar cello concerto in c.1930 also for Columbia with the Hallé and Harty – this recording being made at the Free Trade Hall in Manchester. He also recorded chamber music, for example the Brahms Trio op. 114, in its first recording, with clarinettist Haydn Draper and Hamilton Harty at the piano, and the Beethoven Piano Trio No. 6 in B-flat major Op. 97 "Archduke" with William Murdoch (piano) and Albert Sammons (violin) in 1926.

== Death ==
He died in London, England, UK on 17 March 1963 aged 91.
