= Paul Tortelier =

French cellist and composer

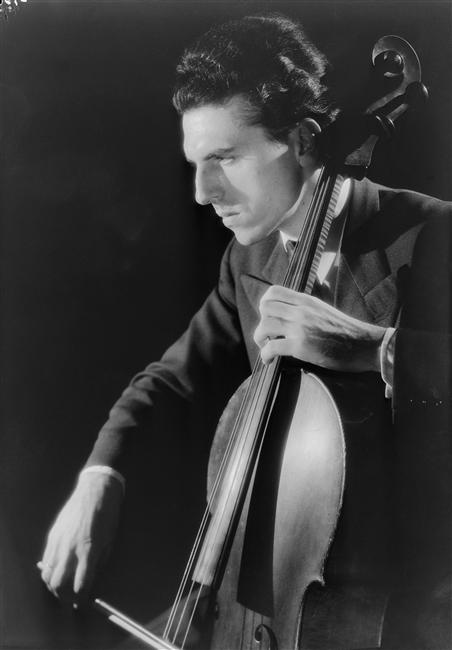
Tortelier in 1948

Paul Tortelier (21 March 1914 – 18 December 1990) was a French cellist and composer. After an outstanding student career at the Conservatoire de Paris he played in orchestras in France and the US before the Second World War. After the war he became a well-known soloist, playing in countries round the globe. He taught at music schools in France, Germany and China, and gave televised masterclasses in England. He was particularly associated with the solo part in Richard Strauss's Don Quixote, cello concertos by Elgar and others, and Bach's Cello Suites.

== Life and work ==
=== Early years ===
Tortelier was born in Paris, the son of Joseph Tortelier and his wife Marguerite, née Boura. Joseph, who came from a family with Breton roots, was a menuisier-ébéniste – a carpenter-cabinet-maker – in Montmartre. Tortelier's mother had a particular love of the cello and he began to play the instrument when he was six. His general education was at the École Lucien Lafflessele, and from the age of nine he studied the cello with Louis Feuillard.

At the age of 12 Tortelier entered the Conservatoire de Paris, where he studied the cello with Gérard Hekking. While a student he earned an income in a trio playing accompaniments to silent films. He won the conservatoire's first prize when he was 16, playing the Elgar Cello Concerto, and then he studied harmony and composition under Jean Gallon. He made his professional début in 1931 at the age of 17, as soloist in Lalo's Cello Concerto with the Orchestre Lamoureux.

In 1935 Tortelier joined the Monte-Carlo Philharmonic Orchestra as first cellist and played with them until 1937. He gave performances under Bruno Walter and Arturo Toscanini, and played the solo part in Richard Strauss's Don Quixote conducted by the composer.

In 1937 Tortelier accepted an invitation from Serge Koussevitzky to join the Boston Symphony Orchestra. He remained until the 1939–40 season. He was in Paris during the Second World War, teaching at the Conservatoire. He had a short-lived marriage to Madeleine Gaston, which ended in divorce in 1944. After the war he was principal cellist of the Orchestre de la Société des Concerts du Conservatoire in 1946–47. In 1946 he married a cello pupil, Maud Monique Martin, with whom he had three children, all of whom became musicians: Yan Pascal, a violinist and subsequently a conductor; Maria de la Pau, a pianist; and Pomona, a cellist.

=== International solo career ===
In 1947 Tortelier's international career as a soloist began in Berlin and Amsterdam. After a concert in the latter city, conducted by Sir Thomas Beecham, at which Tortelier again played the solo part in Don Quixote, Beecham invited him to reprise his performance with the Royal Philharmonic Orchestra (RPO) at a festival of Strauss's music in London, in the presence of the composer. Within days Tortelier gave a recital with Gerald Moore at the Wigmore Hall and recorded the Strauss piece with Beecham and the RPO. After the recital, the music critic of The Times wrote that Tortelier showed himself to be "an artist of great distinction, whose playing combined technical mastery with fine musicianship throughout a programme including works by Bach, Beethoven, Tchaikovsky, Debussy, and virtuoso show-pieces". He added:

By virtue of phrasing and variety of tone M. Tortelier made unaccompanied Bach come alive as few cellists succeed in doing, and his animated interpretation of Debussy's frequently abused sonata brought home its real significance in a way that will not quickly be forgotten.

During his subsequent career Tortelier played throughout Europe, the Americas, Australia, North Africa, Israel, the USSR and Japan, but Britain remained central to his career, and most of his recordings over the next four decades were made there. He found the English baffling in their undemonstrative feelings, but he was fond of them: "I cannot speak of the English without emotion. I owe them everything in terms of my career". He was less at home with Americans, whom he found friendly but lacking in real love.

In 1950 Tortelier was asked by Pablo Casals to play as the principal cellist in the Prades Festival Orchestra; out of respect for Casals, Tortelier agreed. (Note: Other internationally famous soloists who played in Casals's orchestra included Isaac Stern and William Primrose.) He later said, "I have played for Toscanini and Karajan, but I never felt with any conductor what I felt with Casals". More than any other cellist it was Casals who influenced him the most. Tortelier said that there was a spiritual quality in the older man's playing: "one never thought that Casals was playing the cello; he was playing music". Nonetheless, Tortelier gained technical insights from Casals, particularly the latter's flexible use of the left hand on the fingerboard and his assertive phrasing and articulation. He also absorbed Casals's approach to intonation, subtly sharpening or flattening the pitch of notes for the best harmonic effect. Casals said of Tortelier's mastery of the cello, "When you play you make it talk".

Although he was not Jewish (he was an agnostic Roman Catholic) Tortelier was inspired by the ideals of the founders of the newly formed state of Israel in 1948, and in 1955–56 he lived with his wife and children in the kibbutz Ma'abarot, near Haifa. During this period he made his début as a conductor, with the Israel Philharmonic.

Tortelier's international career continued into his seventies. At a concert to mark his 75th birthday he was joined by colleagues including his friend Mstislav Rostropovich, who conducted the Saint-Saëns A-minor concerto with Tortelier as soloist and later in the concert joined him as fellow soloist in a composition of Tortelier's own, the "Valse, alla Maud".

Tortelier died of a heart attack on 18 December 1990 at the age of 76 in the domaine of Villarceaux, Yvelines, near Paris. At a concert the following June to celebrate his life and work, Yehudi Menuhin, Sir Charles Groves and Yan-Pascal Tortelier conducted, and the cellists included Maud Martin Tortelier, János Starker and two of Tortelier's former students, Arto Noras and Raphael Sommer.

== Composer, teacher and innovator ==
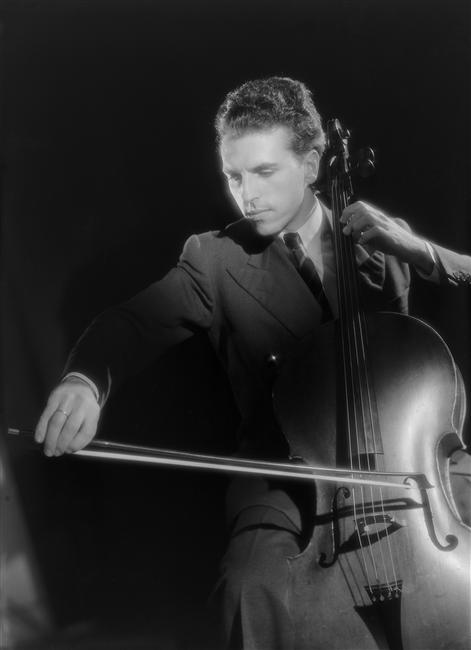
Tortelier by the Studio Harcourt, 1948

Tortelier thought it important for executant musicians to write music, because he felt it enabled him to approach even repertory works as, to some extent, an act of re-creation:

When I ask famous artists why they don't compose they invariably say they don't have the talent. But that is something that develops. They think the first piece they write should be their masterpiece. When it isn't – and it never is – they stop trying".

His compositions include a concerto for two cellos and orchestra (1950), a solo cello suite in D, and two sonatas for cello and piano. He wrote a set of variations for cello and orchestra (May Music Save Peace). He also wrote a symphony, the Israel Symphony. Several of his compositions were included at a special concert to mark his 75th birthday at the Royal Festival Hall in 1989, in which his wife and son joined in his celebrations. He twice edited the Bach Cello Suites; his first version was published by Augener in 1961, and the second by Galliard in 1966. (Note: Tortelier said, "Bach in German means brook – this brook runs to the river and that river runs to the sea. It's a progression which begins delicately and poetically. If you add too much expression with excessive Romanticism, the water stops flowing. ... If you want to do an abstract Bach ... then the water turns cold. That's no longer a Bach who glorifies God and nature, but one who glorifies the metronome.")

Tortelier's students included Noras, Sommer, Jacqueline du Pré, Anne Gastinel and Nathan Waks. He was a professor at the Conservatoire de Paris (1956–69), the Folkwang Hochschule in Essen, Germany (1969–1975), and the Conservatoire Pierre Cochereau, Nice (1978–80). He was also an honorary professor at the Central Conservatoire in Beijing. In the 1960s and 1970s he gave a series of master classes which were recorded and broadcast on TV by the BBC. The Times said of them, "he was the first musician to popularise the master class on BBC television. With his deep-set, expressive eyes, his unruly mop of white hair and broken but articulate English he captivated his audience as much as his pupils". His physical resemblance to the traditional drawings of Cervantes's Don Quixote was remarked on.

Pursuing his encouragement of rising talent, Tortelier was artistic director and panel chairman for Britain's first major cello competition, held in Bristol in 1975. 20 competitors from 12 countries took part, and the gala concert featured the premiere of Tortelier's own Concerto for Two Cellos, performed by the composer and his wife, with their son conducting.

If Tortelier had to play or tune a violin he would do so holding it vertically, like a miniature cello. After he tuned his son's violin thus on one occasion, the young Yan Pascal commented that it did not sound as good when tuned upright as when tuned in its normal horizontal position. Tortelier concurred, and further consideration of the point led him to develop a new kind of endpin, hinged to bring the cello down from nearly vertical to a slope, so that the instrument vibrates more freely, giving greater projection of its sound. This suited some cellists more than others, and according to Grove's Dictionary of Music and Musicians is "not widely used".

== Honours ==
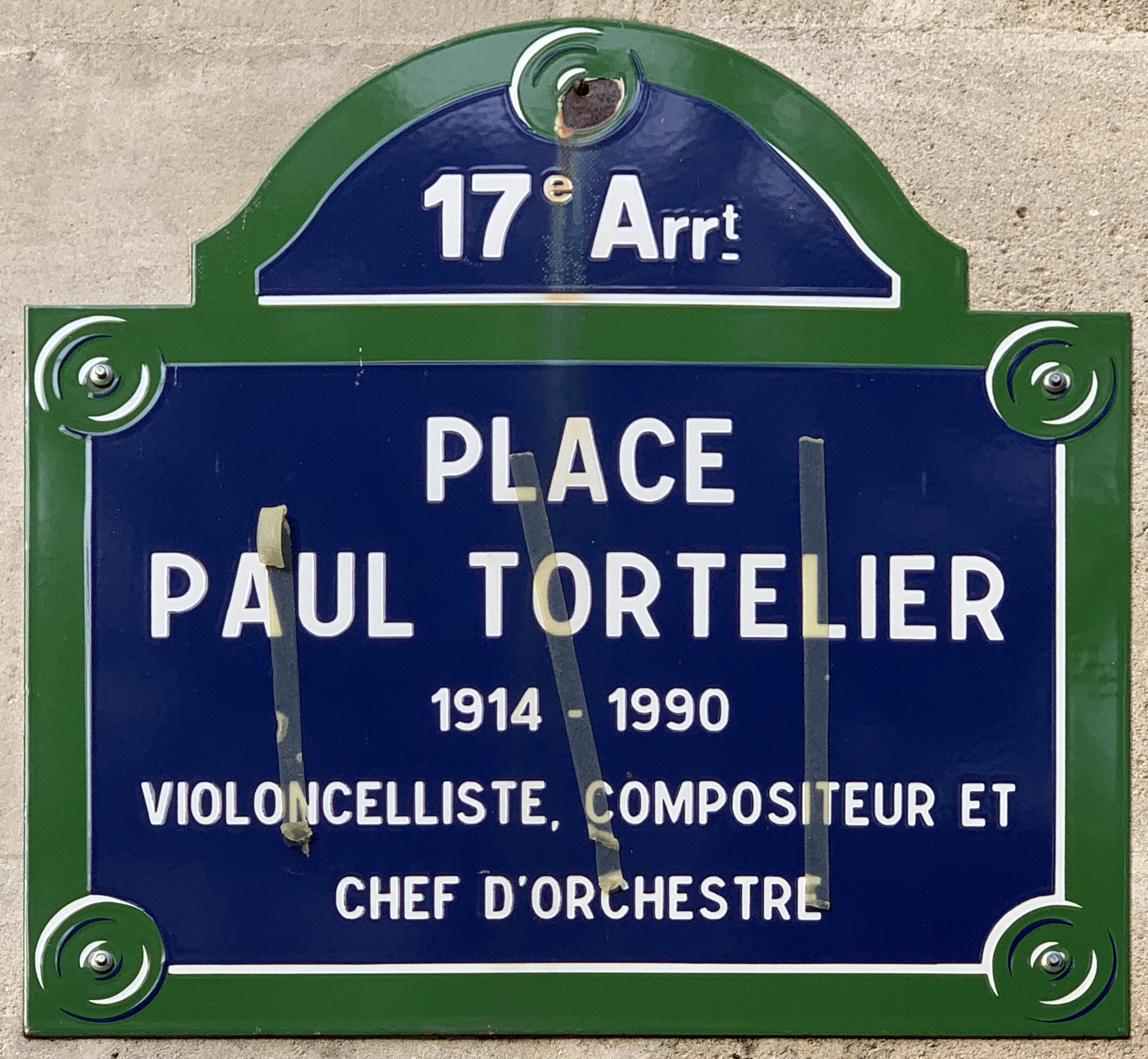
Plaque in the 17th arrondissement of Paris

Tortelier was an honorary member of the Royal Academy of Music in London, held honorary degrees from three English universities, and was a Commander of the Order of the Lion of Finland. A street in the Batignolles-Monceau, the 17th arrondissement of Paris, is named in his honour.

== Recordings ==
Tortelier's extensive discography includes two sets of the Bach Cello Suites, the first made in Paris in 1960 and the second in London in 1982. He recorded Don Quixote twice: first with Beecham and the RPO in 1947 and then in 1973 with Rudolf Kempe and the Staatskapelle Dresden. Gramophone magazine said of the latter that despite the merits of rival recordings, "for sheer charm and elegance" this version won the palm. Tortelier made three studio recordings of the Elgar concerto – with Sir Malcolm Sargent and the BBC Symphony Orchestra in 1953, Sir Adrian Boult and the London Philharmonic Orchestra in 1972, and Groves and the RPO in 1988. The BBC issued a recording of a 1972 concert performance of the concerto with Boult and the BBC Symphony, on a CD that also includes a performance of the Brahms Double Concerto with the Torteliers père et fils as soloists. His other recordings include concertos by Haydn, Saint-Saëns, Dvořák and Walton, Tchaikovsky's Variations on a Rococo Theme, Beethoven's complete works for cello and piano with Éric Heidsieck and the cello sonatas of Debussy and Fauré with Jean Hubeau. With Menuhin he recorded the double concertos of Brahms and Delius.

== Notes, references and sources ==
=== Sources ===
- Martland, Peter (1997). Since Records Began: EMI, the first 100 years. London: Batsford. ISBN 978-0-7134-6207-4.
- Sackville-West, Edward; Shawe-Taylor, Desmond (1955). The Record Guide. London: Collins. OCLC 474839729.
- Tortelier, Paul; David Blum (1984). Paul Tortelier: A Self-Portrait in Conversation with David Blum. London: Heinemann. ISBN 978-0-434-78860-6.
- Wilson, Elizabeth (1998). Jacqueline du Pré. London: Weidenfeld & Nicolson. ISBN 978-0-297-81570-9.
