= Edward Howell (cellist) =

British cellist and music professor (1846 - 1898)

Edward Howell, FRAM (5 February 1846 – 1898) was a British cellist and music professor of the late 19th century. He studied cello at the Royal Academy of Music in London later becoming professor of cello at the Royal College of Music, the Royal Academy of Music and the Guildhall School of Music in London.

== Early life ==
Edward Howell was born in St. Pancras, London, England in 1846. He studied cello at the Royal Academy of Music where he was taught by Piatti.

== Playing career ==
Howell became a member of the Italian Opera Orchestra and from 1872 of the Covent Garden Theatre orchestra. He played regularly at festivals and concerts both in London and throughout the provinces becoming well known as a soloist and quartet player. He was a member of the Philharmonic Society and for many years principal cellist in its orchestra – holding the same position in the Leeds Festival orchestra from 1880; he was also principal cellist at the Three Choirs Festivals and in the Queen's Band. He appeared at the Crystal Palace Concerts for the first time on 27 October 1883 as the soloist in Georg Goltermann's third cello concerto. In 1892 he was one of the three cellists who played in the premiere of Popper's Requiem for Three Cellos and Orchestra (Op. 66) along with the composer and Jules Delsart.

His cello was a Montagnana made in 1747.

== Academic career ==
Howell was Musician in Ordinary to the Queen. He was professor of cello at the Royal College of Music from 1884 to 1898; he also taught at the Royal Academy of Music and the Guildhall School of Music. Amongst his pupils were the cellists W. H. Squire and Herbert Walenn. In 1879 he published A First book for the Violoncello which was an arranged version of the treatise on cello playing technique originally written by Romberg in 1842.

== Death ==
He died in 1898 in St. Pancras, London, England, UK aged 51.
