= Henri Mulet =

French composer (1878–1967)

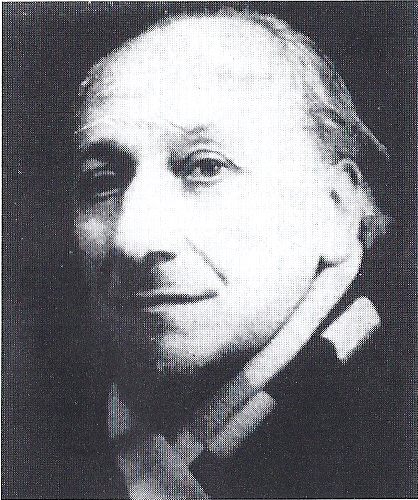
- Mulet (1936)

Background information
- Born: 17 October 1878; Paris, France
- Died: 20 September 1967 (aged 88) Draguignan, France
- Genre: Classical
- Occupations: Composer, organist, cellist
- Instruments: Pipe organ, reed organ, cello
- Spouse: Isabelle-Emilie-Marie Rochereau

Henri Gabriel Mulet (French pronunciation: [ɑ̃ʁi ɡabʁijɛl mylɛ]; 17 October 1878 – 20 September 1967) was a French composer, pipe and reed organist, and cellist.

== Biography ==
Mulet was born on 17 October 1878 in Paris. His father Gabriel Léon Mulet was choirmaster of the Basilica of Sacré-Cœur, where his mother Blanche Victoire Augustine Gatin would also play the harmonium; as a boy he sometimes deputised for her. He studied at the Paris Conservatoire from 1890, where his teachers included Jules Delsart, Raoul Pugno, Xavier Leroux, Alexandre Guilmant and Charles-Marie Widor. He originally intended to be a cellist, but later served as an organist at Saint-Pierre-de-Montrouge and also taught at the École Niedermeyer and the Schola Cantorum, where he worked with his friend Vincent d'Indy. From 1922 to 1937 he was organist at the Église Saint-Philippe-du-Roule.

Mulet's most notable works are for organ: the Esquisses byzantines (1914–1919) and the Carillon-Sortie (1911/12). The former, a set of ten pieces, was a recollection of the Romano-Byzantine architectural style of Sacré-Cœur and five of the pieces are named after some of its features, including "Campanile" (bell-tower) and "Chapelle des Morts" (chapel of the dead). The final toccata "Tu es petra", along with the Carillon-Sortie, has been called "one of the great showpieces of French Romantic organ music". Mulet's complete organ works were recorded in a set of two CDs in 1989, played by Paul Derett.

In 1922 Mulet published "Les tendances et antireligieuses néfastes de l'orgue moderne", an attack on modern schools of organ building; this was followed by similar essays. He deplored the trend to create organs which he felt were more appropriate for the cinema than for church: the organ was "a stained-glass window. Its tones of imposing and embracing calm flood the air of our cathedrals, in the same way that ...stained-glass windows bring down meditation upon the congregation."

In 1937, Mulet, following a financial crisis, destroyed his manuscripts and many of his possessions and left Paris for Draguignan (Var). There he continued as a church organist until 1958, often in poverty (his wife opened a toy-shop in the hope of increasing their income). Ill-health led Mulet and his wife, Isabelle-Emilie-Marie (née Rochereau) to retire to a convent in Draguignan, where he died in 1967.

== Works ==
Mulet's compositions include:

Organ

- Méditation religieuse, 1896?
- Prière, 1902?
- Carillon-Sortie, Procure Générale, 1911 or 1912?
- Offertoire funèbre
- Petit offertoire - Maurice Senart, 1912 reprinted by Edition: "Le Grand Orgue"
- Sortie douce - Maurice Senart, 1912 reprinted by Edition: "Le Grand Orgue"
- Offertoire sur un Alléluia grégorien, pour la fête du Très-Saint-Rosaire
- Esquisses Byzantines (10 pieces), 1914–19, including the popular Tu es petra ("Thou art the rock")

Harmonium

- Angelus (a transcription of his earlier orchestral work "San Salvator").
- Offertoire
- Sortie

Orchestral

- Dans la vallée du tombeau (Souvenir de Lombardie), symphonic poem, 1908
- La Toussaint, symphonic poem, 1909
- Fantaisie pastorale, 1911
- Paysage d’hiver
- Paysages crépusculaires
- Scherzo-Marche
- Petite suite sur des airs populaires français
- Souvenirs de Lombardie

Vocal

- O mon Jésus (hymn), 1900
- L’aigu bruissement, voice and piano, 1904
- Laudate dominum, four voices and organ, 1904
- Soleils couchants, voice and piano, 1904
- Ave Maria, three voices & organ, 1910
- Les deux étoiles, voice and piano, 1910
- Le dernier des Maourys, voice and piano, 1911
- Le talion, voice and orchestra, 1912 (on a text by LeConte de Lisle).

Chamber and instrumental

- Danse afghane, piano, 1904
- 2 noëls, oboe or clarinet & piano, 1904
- Danse persane, piano, 1910
- Petit lied très facile, harpsichord or piano, 1910

Essays

- Les tendances et antireligieuses néfastes de l'orgue modern. Congres General de Musique Sacree, Strasbourg 26-31 Juillet 1921.
- Étude sur le role des mutations et la composition rationelle du Plein-Jeu dans un grand orgue, Strasbourg 26-31 Juillet 1921.
