= Schloss Illerfeld =

Coordinates: 47°56′55.68″N 10°06′34.272″E

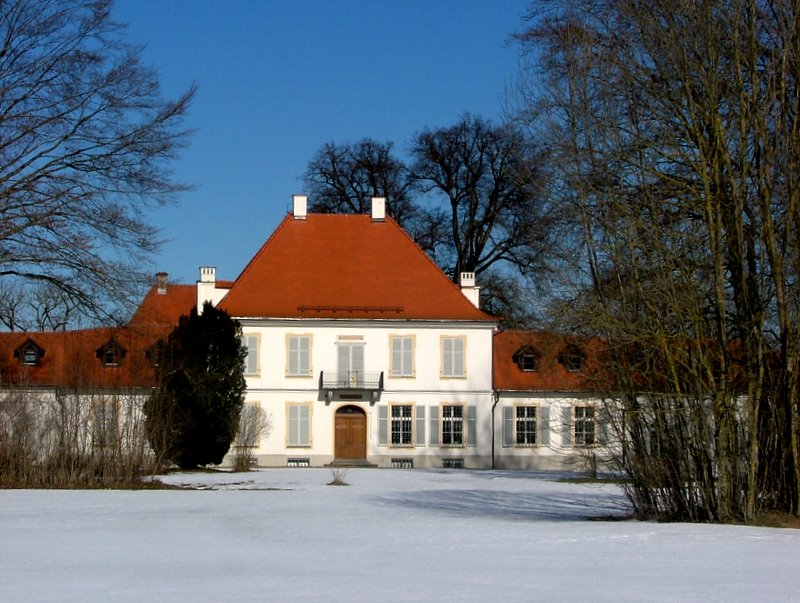
Main building of the schloss from the north

Schloss Illerfeld ("Illerfeld Manor") is a schloss built by Sigmund von Lupine in Illerfeld, a hamlet in the municipality of Ferthofen in the county of Memmingen in Upper Swabia, Germany. The manor, built in 1784, is located not far from the banks of the Iller on a slight rise on the St 2009 state road.

== Description ==
=== Main building ===
The two-storey central building of the schloss has a hipped roof and - with the exception of round windows in the outer wing extensions - rectangular windows. The main building was expanded between 1820 and 1830 to include the outer extensions of its single-storey wings. In the ceiling of the southwest room on the first floor there are the remains of an organ wing from St. Martin's Church in Memmingen. Further fragments of these wings are embedded in the ceiling of the stairwell and in the upper corridor. The stairwell has an oak railing with Empire style motifs. The hall and two adjoining rooms on the upper floor are fitted with two-story stoves. The lower parts of the wood fireplaces are made of cast iron, the upper parts have a crowning vase decoration made of terracotta.

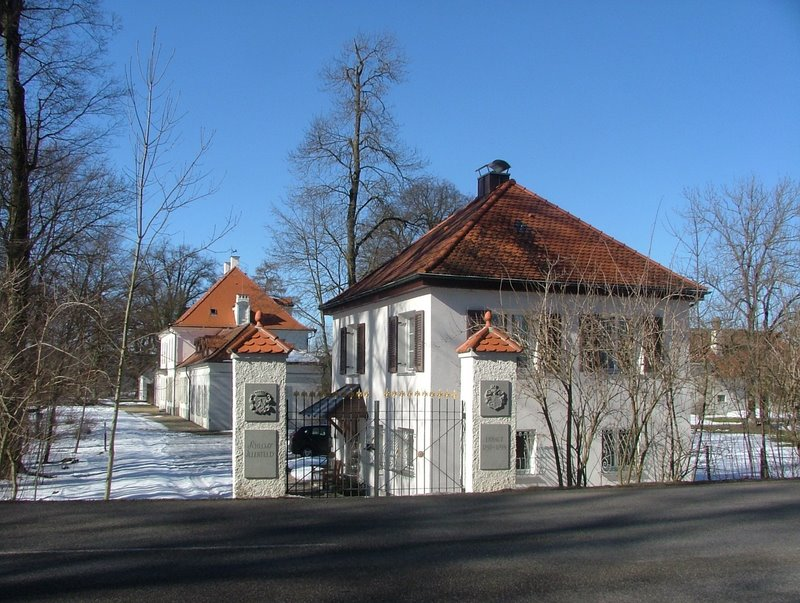
Entrance to the schloss

=== Farm buildings and park ===
The two-storey farmhouse is located north of the residence and has a hipped roof. Immediately next to it is a somewhat smaller building, the barn (Stadel). It too has a hipped roof with shed dormers. On the garden gateway two sandstone panels with coats of arms and inscriptions have been mounted on the front faces of the gate pillars. The garden gateway leads to the outer park, which is separated from the inner park by the St 2009 road. In the outer gardens, about 250 m south of the residence, there is a replica of a sculpture by M. Antonius Antius Lupus, the alleged ancestor of the Lupin family. The original is on the Via Appia in Rome. On the hill, 800 metres south of the schloss, the lord of the manor had an obelisk set up in memory of a beloved riding horse. Between the two monuments there is a tulip tree avenue and a small park.

== Literature ==
- Breuer, Tilmann (1959). Stadt und Land Memmingen (= Bayerische Kunstdenkmale, Volume 4, ISSN 0522-5264). Munich: Deutscher Kunstverlag, p. 129.
- Dehio, Georg, ed. (1989): Handbuch der Deutschen Kunstdenkmäler. Bavaria. Vol. 3: Schwaben. by Bruno Bushart and Georg Paula. Revised edition. Munich: Deutscher Kunstverlag, ISBN 3-422-03008-5, p. 486.
