= Steinseltz =

- Commune
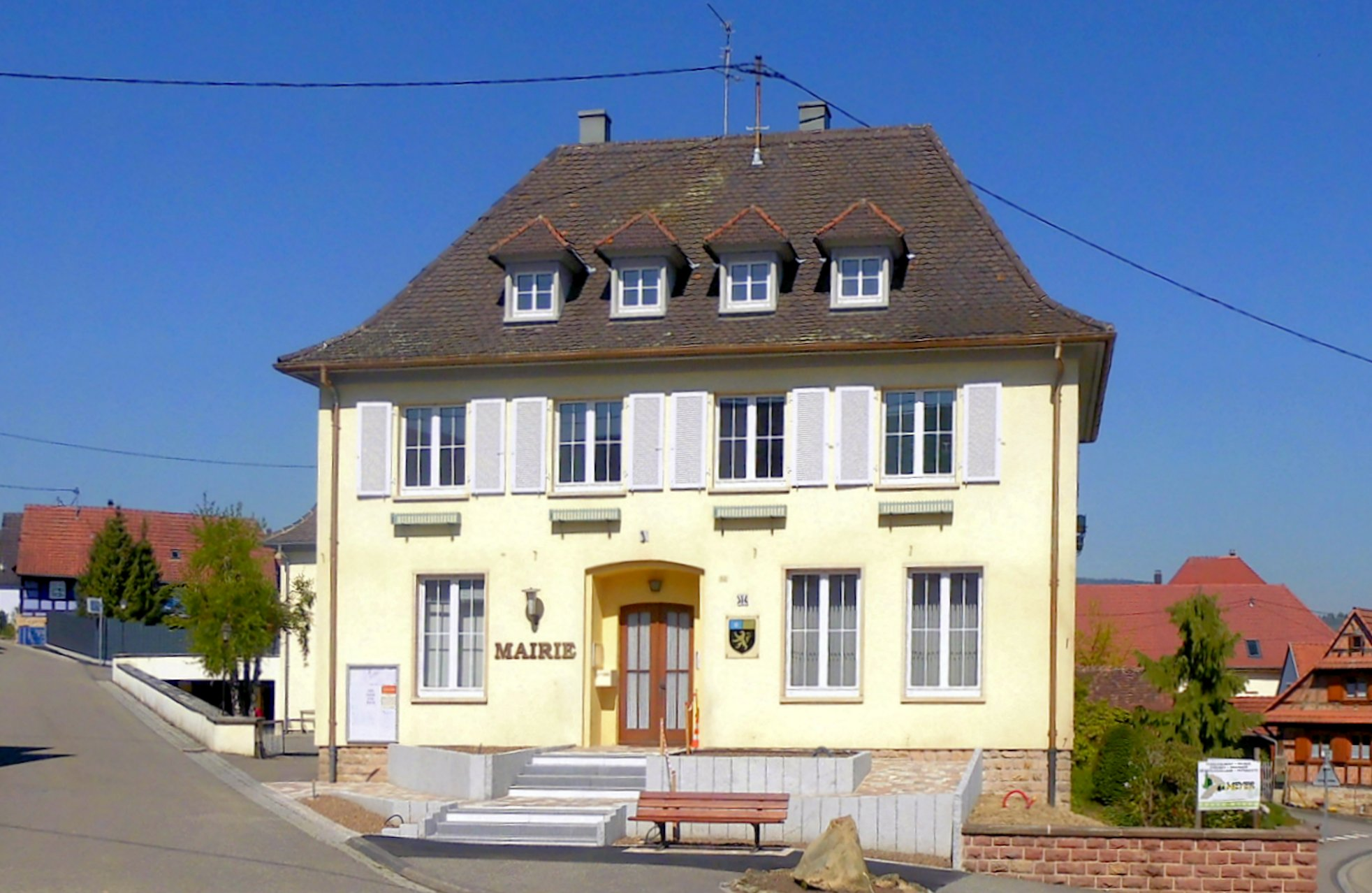
- The town hall in Steinseltz

- Coat of arms
- Location of Steinseltz
- Location within France Location within Grand Est
- Coordinates: 49°00′41″N 7°55′54″E
- Country: France
- Region: Grand Est
- Department: Bas-Rhin
- Arrondissement: Haguenau-Wissembourg
- Canton: Wissembourg

Government
  - Mayor (2020–2026): Christophe Hecky
- Area^{1}: 5.47 km^{2} (2.11 sq mi)
- Elevation: 298 m (978 ft)
- Highest elevation: 252 m (827 ft)
- Lowest elevation: 163 m (535 ft)
- Population (2023): 614
  - Density: 112/km^{2} (291/sq mi)
- Time zone: UTC+01:00 (CET)
  - Summer (DST): UTC+02:00 (CEST)
- INSEE/Postal code: 67479 /67160
- ^{1} French Land Register data, which excludes lakes, ponds, glaciers > 1 km^{2} (0.386 sq mi or 247 acres) and river estuaries.

Steinseltz (German: Steinselz) is a commune in the Bas-Rhin department in Grand Est in north-eastern France.

== See also ==
- Communes of the Bas-Rhin department
