= Cello Concerto =

A cello concerto is a concerto for solo cello with orchestra or, very occasionally, smaller groups of instruments.

Cello Concerto may also refer to:

- Cello Concerto (Albert), 1990
- Cello Concerto (Barber), 1945
- Cello Concerto (Bates), 2014
- Cello Concerto (Boccherini), 1760s–1770s
- Cello Concerto (Brahms), 1887
- Cello Concerto (Carter), 2001
- Cello Concerto (Delius), 1921
- Cello Concerto (Dvořák), 1894
- Cello Concerto (Elgar), 1919
- Cello Concerto (Finzi), 1955
- Cello Concerto (Glass), 2001
- Cello Concerto (Haydn), Various
- Cello Concerto (Honegger), 1929
- Cello Concerto (Khachaturian), 1946
- Cello Concerto (Kraft), first published in 1805
- Cello Concerto (Lalo), 1876
- Cello Concerto (Ligeti), 1966
- Cello Concerto (Lutosławski), 1970
- Cello Concerto (MacMillan), 1996
- Cello Concerto (Margola), 1949
- Cello Concerto (Muhly), 2012
- Cello Concerto (Myaskovsky), 1945
- Cello Concerto (Panufnik), 1992
- Cello Concerto (Prokofiev), 1938
- Cello Concerto (Rorem), 2003
- Cello Concerto (Rouse), 1992
- Cello Concerto (Saint-Saëns), 1872
- Cello Concerto (Sallinen), a composition by Aulis Sallinen, 1976
- Cello Concerto (Salonen), 2017
- Cello Concerto (Schumann), 1850
- Cello Concerto (Stanford), a composition by Charles Villiers Stanford
- Cello Concerto (Sullivan), 1866
- Cello Concerto (Tchaikovsky/Leonovich), completed in 2006
- Cello Concerto (Thomson), 1950
- Cello Concerto (Walton), 1957
- Cello Concerto (Waterhouse), Op. 27, 1990
- Cello Concerto (Zwilich), 2020

== See also ==
- Cello Concerto No. 1 (disambiguation)
- Cello Concerto No. 2 (disambiguation)
- Cello Concerto in A major (Dvořák), 1865
- Cello Concerto in D minor (Cassadó), 1926
- Cello Concerto in E major (Cassadó-Tchaikovsky)
- Cello (disambiguation)
- Concerto (disambiguation)
- Haydn Cello Concerto (disambiguation)
