= Cello concerto =

Concerto for solo cello and instrumental ensemble

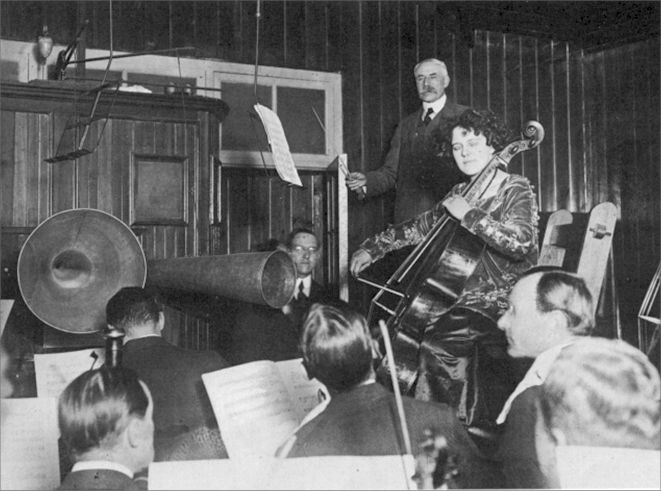
Edward Elgar and Beatrice Harrison recording Elgar's cello concerto in 1920

A cello concerto (sometimes called a violoncello concerto) is a concerto for solo cello with orchestra or, very occasionally, smaller groups of instruments.

These pieces have been written since the Baroque era if not earlier. However, unlike instruments such as the violin, the cello had to face harsh competition from the older, well-established viola da gamba. As a result, few important cello concertos were written before the 19th century – with the notable exceptions of those by Vivaldi, C.P.E. Bach, Haydn and Boccherini. Its full recognition as a solo instrument came during the Romantic era with the concertos of Schumann, Saint-Saëns, Lalo and Dvořák. From then on, cello concertos have become more and more frequent. Twentieth-century composers have made the cello a standard concerto instrument, along with the already-rooted piano and violin concertos; among the most notable concertos of the first half of the century are those of Elgar, Prokofiev, Barber and Hindemith. Many post-World War II composers (Shostakovich, Walton, Ligeti, Britten, Dutilleux, Lutoslawski and Penderecki among others) have written at least one.

One special consideration composers must take with the cello (as well as all instruments with a low range) is with the issue of projection. Unlike instruments like the violin, whose high range projects fairly easily above the orchestra, the cello's lower notes can be easily lost when the cello is not playing a solo or near solo. Because of this, composers have had to deliberately pare down the orchestral component of cello concertos while the cello is playing in the lower registers.

== Selected list of cello concertos ==
Cello concertos near the center of the "repertoire". The original list of cello concertos has been moved to List of compositions for cello and orchestra.

- Carl Philipp Emanuel Bach
  - Cello Concerto in A minor (Wq 170)
  - Cello Concerto in B♭ major (Wq 171)
  - Cello Concerto in A major (Wq 172)
- Samuel Barber
  - Cello Concerto in A minor, Op. 22 (1945)
- Luigi Boccherini
  - Cello Concertos 1-12 including:
    - Cello Concerto in D major, G. 479
    - Cello Concerto in B♭ major, G. 482
- Fritz Brun
  - Cello Concerto in D minor (1947)
- Elliott Carter
  - Cello Concerto
- Frederick Delius
  - Cello Concerto (1921)
- Antonín Dvořák
  - Cello Concerto No. 1 in A major, Op. posth
  - Cello Concerto No. 2 in B minor, Opus. 104 (1894–1895)
- Edward Elgar
  - Cello Concerto in E minor, Op. 85 (1918–1919)
- Gerald Finzi
  - Cello Concerto, Op. 40 (1955)
- Philip Glass
  - Concerto for Cello and Orchestra No. 1 (2001)
  - Concerto for Cello and Orchestra No. 2 Naqoyqatsi (2002/2012)
- Joseph Haydn
  - Cello Concerto No. 1 in C major
  - Cello Concerto No. 2 in D major
  - Cello Concerto No. 3 in C major (lost)
  - Cello Concerto No. 4 in D major (spurious, written by Giovanni Battista Costanzi)
  - Cello Concerto No. 5 in C major (spurious, written by David Popper)
  - Cello Concerto in G minor (doubtful, lost)
- Paul Hindemith
  - Cello Concerto in E♭ major, Op. 3 (1916)
  - Kammermusik No. 3 for cello and 10 instruments, Op. 36/2 (1925)
  - Cello Concerto in G (1940)
- Arthur Honegger
  - Cello Concerto (1934)
- Dmitri Kabalevsky
  - Cello Concerto No. 1 in G minor, Op. 49 (1949)
  - Cello Concerto No. 2 in C minor, Op. 77 (1964)
- Aram Khachaturian
  - Cello Concerto in E minor (1946)
  - Concerto-Rhapsody in D minor (1963)
- Erich Wolfgang Korngold
  - Cello Concerto in C major, Op. 37 (1950)
- Milan Kymlicka
  - Cello Concerto
- Édouard Lalo
  - Cello Concerto in D minor (1876)
- György Ligeti
  - Cello Concerto (1966)
- Witold Lutosławski
  - Cello Concerto (1969–70)
- Bohuslav Martinu (1890 - 1959)
  - Cello Concerto No. 1 (1924)
  - Cello Concerto No. 2 (1945)
- Peter Mennin
  - Concerto for Cello and Orchestra (1956)
- Georg Matthias Monn (1717 - 1750)
  - Cello Concerto in G minor
- Wolfgang Amadeus Mozart
  - Cello Concerto, K. 206a (1775, lost)
- Nikolai Myaskovsky
  - Cello Concerto in C minor, Op. 66 (1944)
- Arvo Pärt
  - Pro et Contra, concerto for cello and orchestra (1966)
- Krzysztof Penderecki
  - Cello Concerto No. 1 (1972)
  - Cello Concerto No. 2 (1982)
- David Popper
  - Concerto No. 1 in D minor, Op. 8 (1865)
  - Concerto No. 2 in E minor, Op. 24 (1862)
  - Concerto No. 3 in G major, Op. 59 (1888)
  - Concerto No. 4 in B minor, Op. 72 (1900)
  - Concerto in C major, WoO (1894, mis-attributed to Joseph Haydn)
- Sergei Prokofiev
  - Cello Concerto, Op. 58
  - Symphony-Concerto, Op. 125 (revision of Op. 58)
  - Cello Concertino in G minor, Op. 132 (incomplete) (1952)
- Behzad Ranjbaran
  - Cello Concerto (1998)
- Einojuhani Rautavaara
  - Cello Concerto No. 1 (1968)
  - Cello Concerto No. 2 Towards the Horizon (2010)
- Camille Saint-Saëns
  - Cello Concerto No. 1 in A minor, Op. 33 (1872)
  - Cello Concerto No. 2 in D minor, Op. 119 (1902) ()
- Robert Schumann
  - Cello Concerto in A minor, Op. 129 (1850)
- Alfred Schnittke
  - Cello Concerto No. 1 (1985/1986)
  - Cello Concerto No. 2 (1990)
- Dmitri Shostakovich
  - Cello Concerto No. 1 in E♭ major, Op. 107 (1959)
  - Cello Concerto No. 2 in G major/minor, Op. 126 (1966)
- Carl Stamitz (1745-1801)
  - Cello Concertos 1-3
- Arthur Sullivan
  - Cello Concerto (1866)
- Giuseppe Tartini
  - Cello Concerto in A major
  - Cello Concerto in D major
- Henri Vieuxtemps
  - Cello Concerto in A minor, Op. 46 (1877)
  - Cello Concerto in B minor, Op. 50 (1879)
- Heitor Villa-Lobos
  - Cello Concerto No. 1 (1915)
  - Cello Concerto No. 2 (1953)
- Antonio Vivaldi
  - At least 25 Cello Concertos (RV 398-399 / 400-408 / 410-424)
- William Walton
  - Cello Concerto (1956)
- Mieczysław Weinberg
  - Concerto for Cello and Orchestra (1948)
- John Williams
  - Concerto for Cello and Orchestra (1994)
  - Heartwood: Lyric Sketches for Cello and Orchestra (2002)
- Isang Yun
  - Concerto for Cello and Orchestra (1975/76)
- Maury Yeston
  - Concerto for Cello and Orchestra (1966/67)

=== Selected list of other concertante works ===
- Ludwig van Beethoven
  - Triple Concerto for Piano, Violin and Cello in C major Op. 56 (1803)
- Howard Blake
  - Diversions for cello and orchestra (1985)
- Ernest Bloch
  - Schelomo, Rhapsodie Hebraïque for violoncelle et grand orchestre (1916)
- Johannes Brahms
  - Double Concerto in A minor for Violin and Cello, Op. 102 (1887)
- Frank Bridge
  - Oration
- Benjamin Britten
  - Cello Symphony Op. 68 (1963)
- Max Bruch
  - Kol Nidrei Op. 47 (1880)
- Henri Dutilleux
  - Tout un monde lointain... (1970)
- Antonín Dvořák
  - Rondo in G minor, Op. 94, 1893
  - Silent Woods, Op. 68, B. 182 (transcribed from Op. 68, no. 5 for piano four hands)
- Gabriel Fauré
  - Elégie for Cello and Orchestra, Op. 24
- Sofia Gubaidulina
  - The Canticle of the Sun (1996)
- Joseph Haydn
  - Sinfonia Concertante for Oboe, Bassoon, Violin & Cello, Hob. I/105 (1792)
- Olivier Messiaen
  - Concert à quatre for Piano, Cello, Flute and Oboe (1990–1992)
- Michael Nyman
  - Double Concerto for Saxophone, Cello and Orchestra (1997)
- Richard Strauss
  - Don Quixote, Op. 35 (1897)
- Toru Takemitsu
  - Scene: for cello and string orchestra (1958)
  - Quatrain for clarinet, violin, cello, piano and orchestra (1975)
  - Orion and Pleiades for Cello and Orchestra (1984)
- Pyotr Ilyich Tchaikovsky
  - Variations on a Rococo Theme, Op. 33 (1876-1877)
- Antonio Vivaldi
  - Double Concerto for Violoncello, Bassoon and Strings in E minor, RV 409
  - Double Concerto for 2 Violoncellos in G minor, RV 531
- John Williams
  - Highwood's Ghost for Cello, Harp, and Orchestra (2018)

== See also ==
- Cello sonata
- List of compositions for cello and orchestra
