= Concertino =

Concertino may refer to:

- Concertino (composition), a small or short concerto
- Concertino (group), the group of soloists in a concerto grosso
- Concertino (Janáček), a 1926 composition by Leoš Janáček
- Concertino, a 1952 ballet by George Balanchine

== See also ==
- Concertina, a musical instrument
- Concerto (disambiguation)
