= Suite (Cassadó) =

1926 composition by Gaspar Cassadó

The Suite for Solo Cello was written in 1926 by Gaspar Cassadó. This suite for violoncello, like the Cello Concerto and the Piano Trio, came from one of Cassadó's most prolific periods, in the mid-1920s. It was dedicated to Francesco von Mendelssohn, "a Francesco von Mendelssohn con affettuosa eprofonda amicizi."

== History ==
Cassadó may have been influenced by the Bach Cello Suites when composing the solo suite in 1926. Cassadó's teacher was Pablo Casals, who is credited for rediscovering the Bach cello suites in the early 20th century. Cassadó was Barcelonian, and his family moved to Paris when he was 10 where he started his studies with Casals. Many of Cassadó's compositions draw from elements of Spanish folk music and French nationalism. Cassadó's Catalonian background contributed to the Catalan cello school and is evident of the virtuoso movement of the 19th century.

There may be connections between the Bach Cello Suites and the Cassado Solo Suite. The three dance movements reflect elements present in the Baroque dance movements, such as adding embellishments as a common practice in baroque performance.

== Movements ==
The suite consists of three dance movements.

1. Preludio-Fantasia – a Zarabanda
2. Sardana (Danza)
3. Intermezzo e Danza Finale

One of Cassado's cello students, Marcel Cervera attributes the movements, "to depict three regions of his home country: Castilla y La Mancha (the centre of Spain), Catalonia (his home in the north-east) and Andalusia (the south)." The suite first starts with a prelude, just like the introductory prelude to a Baroque suite. The preludio-fantasia is a zarabanda representing the central region of Spain, Castilla-La Mancha. This movement expresses the Spanish musical style. The 3/4 meter gives the sense of a zarabanda with "dramatic dynamic surges, Spanish chords and gestures contrasting impressionist colors," Eunice Koh Kai’En writes about measure 1-5:

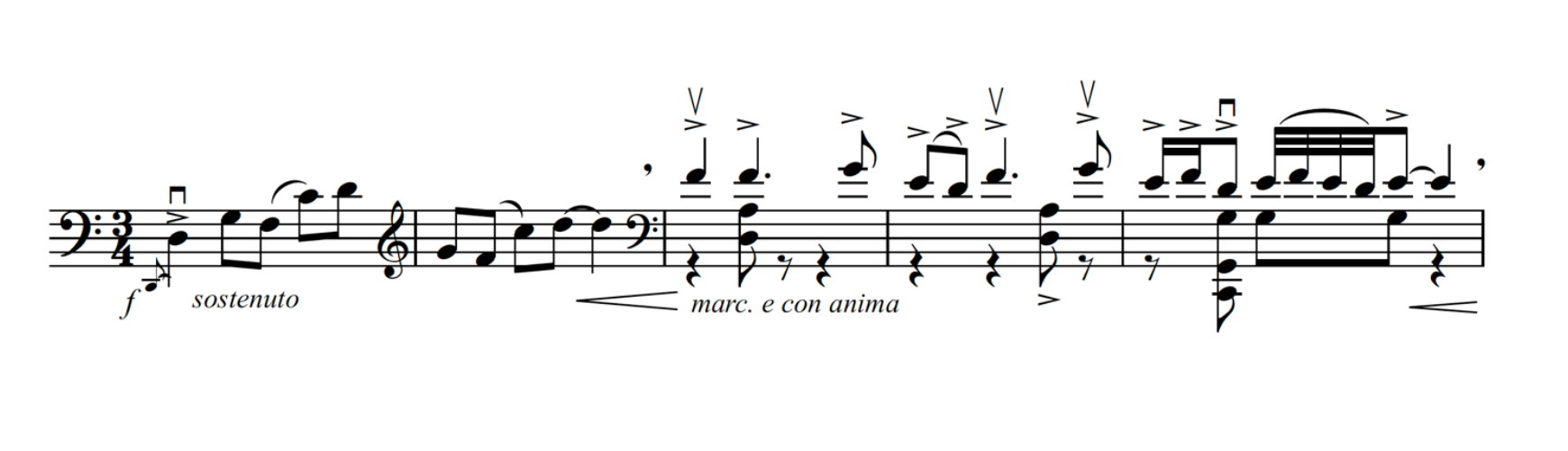
Cassadó Suite for Solo Cello, Preludio – Fantasia, mm. 1-5

Marcel Cervera suggested that the first movement quotes two literary characters from old Castille: Don Quixote, quotes in the forte passage, and Dulcinea, in the following dolce passage. Additionally, the dolce theme representing Dulcinea quotes the flute solo from Maurice Ravel's ballet Daphnis et Chloé. This can be supported by the fact that Cassadó's upbringing in Paris was while the French Impressionistic period was happening.

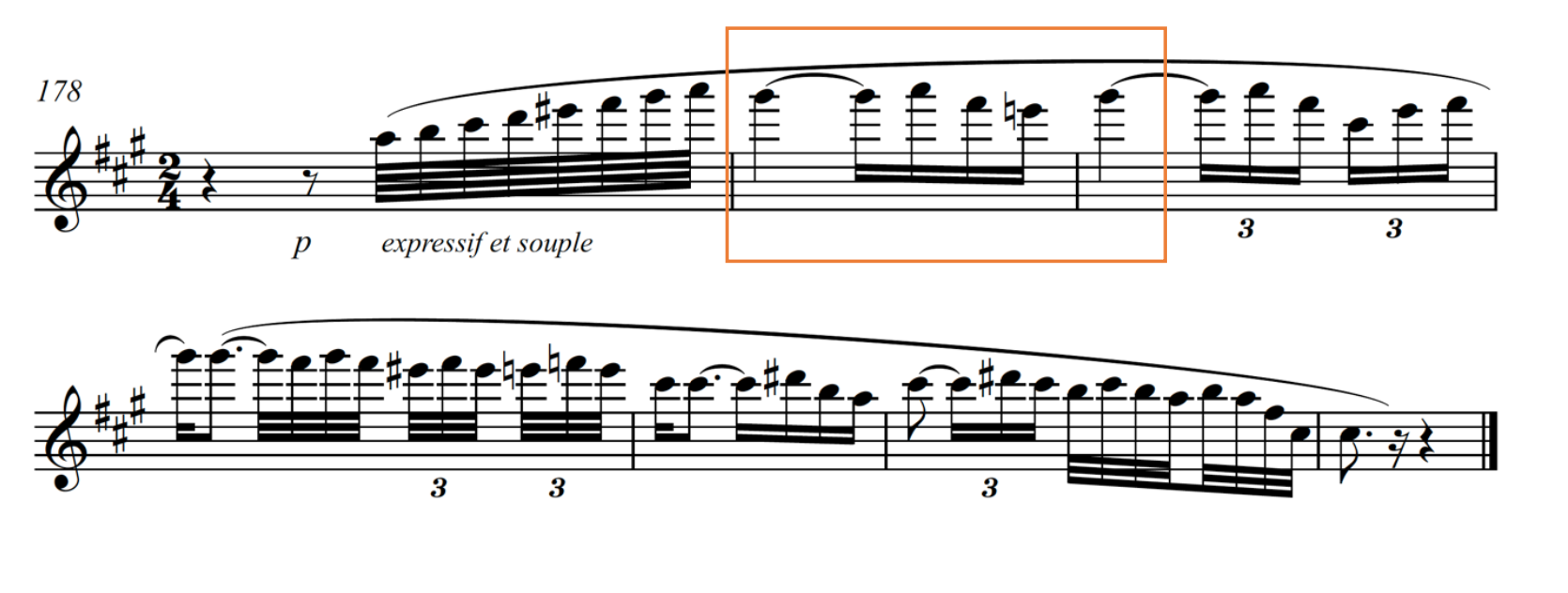
Ravel Daphnis et Chloé, Flute Excerpt, mm. 178–183.

The second movement is a sardana representing Catalonia. Cassadó's sardana harkens back to the genre-specific folk dance in Catalonia, which uses unique Catalan instruments like the tenora and flaviol. The harmonics at the beginning of the movement imitate the flaviol. Other details characteristic of the traditional sardana form include the rhythm of two quarter notes and two eighth notes. Overall, the second movement establishes D major writing many open fifths to follow the natural resonance of the cello.

The final movement, Intermezzo e Danza Finale, is a jota, representing the southern region of Andalusia. The movement suggests a strong influence from Andalusia's musical heritage from Spanish guitar technique and flamenco harmonies. Cassadó notates strummed chords represent rhythmical strumming of a guitar and castanets of the fandango. The movement is emulative of a fandango with the third movement's slow introduction, then gradually moving through tempiosof increasing momentum until reaching a great finale.

== Influence ==
This suite was popularized by the cellist János Starker. Janos Starker recorded and popularized the suite in 1988. Cassadó never recorded it himself. The lasting impact of the solo suite reflects Cassadó's contributions towards experimental technique and extended technique on the cello, evident through quadruple stops (when four notes are played at once across all strings) and notating extreme dynamic markings.

Many view Cassadó's suite as evidence of his legacy as a Catalonian cellist, and is "imbued with Spanish and particularly Catalonian intonations and rhythms; they feature expressiveness and vividness of content, clear form, a wealth of melody, colorful harmony and mastery of polyphony." Traditional dance structure is taken and applies it to the solo cello by use of range, double stops, and contrapuntal writing in the Suite. The suite achieves resonance and brilliance relating keys to the open strings. While Cassadó did not record his composition himself, there is evidence from his musical life and editorial markings of how to approach the performance practices. There is still interpretational variation that exists across recordings.

== Recordings ==
- 1982 - George Keikrug; Boston University. School of Music., Neikrug, G., Kodály, Z., Neikrug, M., & Cassadó, G. (1982). Twentieth century works for unaccompanied cello.
- 1988 - Janos Starker, "Cassadó: Suite for Unaccompanied Cello"
- 2014 - Alisa Weilerstein, Solo
- 2019 – Marina Tarasova, Gaspar Cassadó: Romantic Cello Music & Transcriptions
