= Robert Kahn (composer) =

German composer, pianist, and music teacher

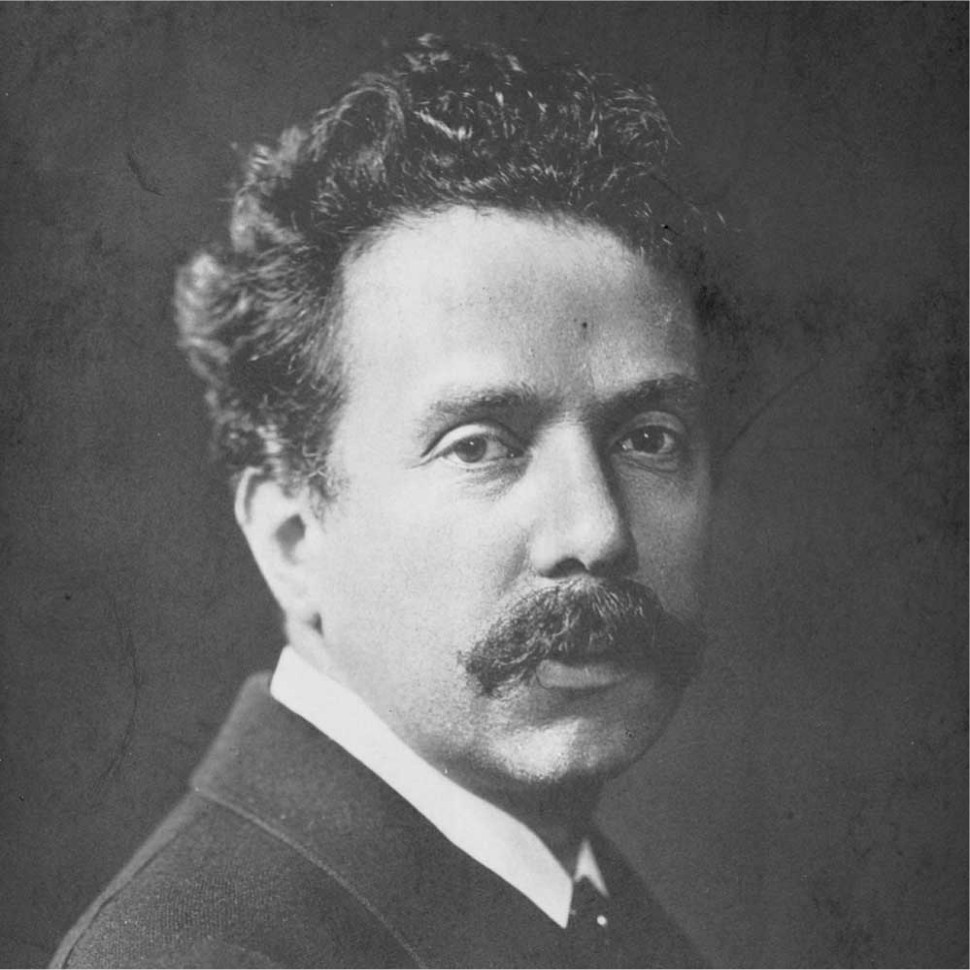
Robert Kahn

Robert Kahn (21 July 1865 – 29 May 1951) was a German composer, pianist, and music teacher.

== Life ==
Kahn was born in Mannheim, the second son of Bernhard Kahn and Emma Eberstadt. One of his seven siblings was the banker Otto Kahn, whose son Roger Wolfe Kahn was a jazz musician, composer and aviator. Kahn's parents belonged to a German-Jewish family of bankers and merchants.

In 1882, Kahn entered the Königlichen Hochschule für Musik in Berlin, where he studied for the next three years. Between 1885 and 1886, he continued his musical education under Josef Rheinberger in Munich. On a visit to Vienna the following year, Kahn met and befriended composer Johannes Brahms, who offered to make Kahn his pupil. Although Kahn declined the invitation, Brahms's music exerted a profound influence on his compositional style throughout his career.

After finishing his military service, Kahn worked as a freelance composer in Berlin until 1890. For the next three years he was employed as a rehearsal pianist at the Stadttheater in Leipzig. Having been appointed lecturer in composition at his alma mater in 1894, Kahn trained some of the best-known musicians of the 20th century. His students include the pianists Arthur Rubinstein and Wilhelm Kempff, the conductor Ferdinand Leitner, the composers Theodore Holland, Nikos Skalkottas and Günter Raphael, and the violinist Karl Klingler. While Kahn was composing and teaching in Berlin, he also was active as chamber musician and accompanist in concert with soloists including Joseph Joachim, Richard Mühlfeld, Adolf Busch, Johan Messchaert, Ilona Durigo, and Emmy Destinn.

In 1916, Kahn was elected to the Prussian Academy of Arts, a membership he held until 1934 when the Nazi regime ordered him to resign because he was Jewish. The Nazis also prohibited the publication and performance of his music. This drove him, at the age of 73, to leave Germany for England in 1939 with his wife Katharina, where he spent the last years of his life in relative obscurity but composing prolifically. He lived in Ashtead, Surrey, and in Biddenden, Kent, where he died. Kahn and his music were almost entirely forgotten after World War II, but have later been rediscovered by musicians and audiences.

== Works ==
Kahn composed a vast quantity of chamber music. He was an admirer of Max Reger. Aside from the serenade Aus der Jugendzeit ("From Youth") and the Konzertstück Op. 74 for piano and orchestra in E-flat minor, he mostly avoided the large-scale orchestral forms and emotional extravagance of late Romantic music. He wrote a number of works for chorus and orchestra, such as the Goethe setting Mahomets Gesang, Op. 24 (1896); the Sturmlied, Op. 53 for chorus, orchestra and organ (1910); and the Festgesang, Op. 64 for chorus, orchestra and organ.

Of his chamber music, there are three violin sonatas, two cello sonatas, four piano trios, two string quartets, three piano quartets and two piano quintets. Particularly notable are the Violin Sonata in E, Op. 50 (1907); the Piano Quartets, Op. 30 (1899) and Op. 41 (1904); and the String Quartet in A minor, Op. 60 (1914). The unconventionally scored Quintet in C minor of 1911 (for piano, violin, cello, clarinet, and horn), was recorded by the Ensemble Emigré in 2021. Lieder were also very important to Kahn: he composed around 180 solo songs and 13 duets.

Kahn was often commissioned to create works for musicians in the late 19th and early 20th century. His first Violin Sonata in G minor (1886) was dedicated to Joseph Joachim, who asked to perform it when Kahn was still a young student in Berlin. Clara Schumann mentioned this sonata in her diary. The String Quartet No. 1 in A major, Op. 8 (1889) was dedicated to and first performed by the Joachim Quartet. In 1890 Hans von Bülow conducted the Berlin Philharmonic Orchestra in the world premiere of Kahn's Aus der Jugendzeit orchestral serenade in E major. The second Violin Sonata, in A minor, Op. 26 (1897) was also dedicated to Joachim. His Clarinet Trio, Op. 45 (circa 1905) was dedicated to and performed by the clarinetist Richard Mühlfeld. The second string quartet (1914) was premiered by the Klingler Quartet. Kahn gave the first performance of his Suite, Op. 69 for violin and piano with Adolf Busch in 1920.

His renewed compositional activity after leaving Germany in 1938 resulted in a large collection of piano music, including more than 1160 pieces. These took the form of a musical diary, the Tagebuch in Tönen, begun in 1935, with Kahn writing several short piano works per week until his death in 1951. Apart from an extracted set of 29, these only exist in manuscript form at the Akademie der Künste in Berlin. The pianist Maksim Štšura has recorded a selection, as has Danny Driver.

== Recordings ==
- Adrift: includes Trio Serenade, op. 73. Delphine Trio, TRPTK TTK0113 (2024) and Ensemble Schumann, MSR (2014)
- Cello Sonatas: No. 1, op. 37 (1903) and No. 2, op. 56 (1911), Three Pieces, op. 25 (1897). Torleif Thedéen (violoncello) & Oliver Triendl (piano), CPO 555139-2 (2019)
- Chamber Music: Piano Trio No. 4 in E minor, op 72 (1922), Serenade in F minor, op 73, Piano Quintet in D major (1926). Hohenstaufen Ensemble, Hanssler Classic HC22075 (2023)
- Clarinet Trios: includes Clarinet Trio, op. 45 (1906). Trio Bornalie, HERA 02113 (2005)
- Complete Piano Quartets: No. 1 in B minor, op. 14 (publ. 1891), No. 2 in A minor, op. 30 (publ. 1899), No. 3 in C minor, op. 41 (publ. 1904). Zilliacus Trio & Oliver Triendl (piano), CPO 555 150-2 (2025)
- Complete Piano Trios: No. 1 in E major, op. 19 (1893), No. 2 in E flat major, op. 33 (1900), No. 3 in C minor, op. 35 (1902), No. 4 in E minor, op. 72 (1914). Hyperion Trio, CPO 777 791-2 (2014)
- Harbingers of Exile. Songs from the In-Between, Florian Störtz (bass-baritone) & Aleksandra Myslek (piano). Delphian DCD34349 (2026)
- Kahn Piano Trios: No. 1 and No. 2. Max Brod Trio, MDG 90319406 (2016)
- Leaves from the Tree of Life: Lieder selection and excepts from Tagebuch in Tönen. Ensemble Emigré, Rubicon Classics RCD1040 (2021)
- Robert Kahn: Piano Quartet No. 2 (1899), Serenade for String Trio (1933). Hohenstaufen Ensemble, Hänssler Classic HC98010 (2013)
- Works for Violin and Piano: Violin Sonata No. 1 in G minor, op. 5 (1886), Violin Sonata No. 2 in A minor, op. 26, Violin Sonata No. 3 in E Major (1907), op. 50, 5 Tonbilder, op. 36, 2 Violinstücke, op. 4, Suite in D Minor, op. 69. Elina Vähälä (violin) & Oliver Triendl (piano). CPO 777785-2 (2016)
- Praeludium: No.1 from Neun Gesänge op. 31. Helen Bailey (soprano), conducted by Shelley Katz using the Symphonova.

== See also ==
- List of émigré musicians from Nazi Europe who settled in Britain
