= Cello Concerto No. 1 =

Cello Concerto No. 1 may refer to:

- Cello Concerto No. 1 (Dvořák) in A major (B. 10) by Antonín Dvořák, 1865
- Cello Concerto No. 1 (Glass) (Concerto for Cello and Orchestra) by Philip Glass, 2001
- Cello Concerto No. 1 (Haydn) in C major (Hob. VIIb/1) by Joseph Haydn, c. 1761–65
- Cello Concerto No. 1 (Lindberg) by Magnus Lindberg, 1999
- Cello Concerto No. 1 (Penderecki) by Krzysztof Penderecki, 1967–73
- Cello Concerto No. 1 (Saint-Saëns) in A minor (Op. 33) by Camille Saint-Saëns, 1872
- Cello Concerto No. 1 (Shostakovich) in E-flat major (Op. 107) by Dmitri Shostakovich, 1959
- Cello Concerto No. 1 (Villa-Lobos) (Op. 50, Grande Concerto No. 1) by Heitor Villa-Lobos, c. 1915

== See also ==
- Cello Concerto (disambiguation)
- Cello Concerto No. 2 (disambiguation)
