= William Starr (violinist) =

American violinist, conductor, and teacher (1923–2020)

William Starr (1923-2020) was an American violinist, conductor, teacher, academic and author best known for teaching the Suzuki method in America.

== Life and career ==
Raised in Kansas, Starr (age 17) debuted as a soloist with the Kansas City Philharmonic. Training at the Eastman School of Music, he became an academic at the University of Tennessee Department of Music, which he later chaired (1977–1982).

In the 1960s he moved to Japan to study with Shinichi Suzuki, before returning to America to bring what was then a technique relatively new to the country. Starr was a founder and first president (1972 to 1974) of the Suzuki Association of the Americas (SAA).

== Books ==
- Bockmon, Guy Alan; Starr, William J. (1962). Perceiving Music: Problems in Sight and Sound. Harcourt, Brace & World.
- Starr, William; Starr, Constance (1999). To Learn with Love: A Companion for Suzuki Parents. Alfred Music. ISBN 9781457403675.
- Starr, William J. (2000). The Suzuki violinist : a guide for teachers and parents (Rev. ed.). Summy-Birchard. ISBN 978-0-87487-605-5.

=== Music ===
- Starr, William J. (1994). 77 variations on Suzuki melodies : technique-builders for violin. [United States]: Summy-Birchard. ISBN 9780874876178.
- Starr, William J. (2000). Adventures in music reading for violin. Book III : a comprehensive music reading series. [U.S.]: Summy-Birchard Music. ISBN 9780874876659.
