= Blanche Ray Alden =

American pianist and composer

Blanche Ray Alden (July 5, 1870 (Note: Based on the year of birth (1870), the location of birth (Springfield, Massachusetts), and the usage of Dutton as a part of pseudonym's surname, this ancestral record entails that her accurate date of birth is July 5, 1870.) – November 14, 1934) was an American pianist and composer, who published under the pseudonym Theodora Dutton. Her short piano piece, Christmas Day Secrets, is the only work in the Suzuki Piano Repertoire attributed to a female composer.

== Sources ==
- Suzuki, Dr. Shinichi. (1995). Suzuki Piano School Volume 1, Revised edition. Alfred Publishing Company. ISBN 978-0-87487-473-0
- Ccm :: Alden, Blanche Ray Alden - Dutton, Theodora Dutton at composers-classical-music.com
