= Cello Concerto No. 2 =

Cello Concerto No. 2 may refer to:

- Cello Concerto No. 2 (Boccherini) in A major (G. 475) by Luigi Boccherini
- Cello Concerto No. 2 (Dvorak) in B minor (Op. 104, B. 191) by Antonín Dvořák, 1894–95
- Cello Concerto No. 2 (Haydn) in D Major (Hob. VIIb/2, Op. 101) by Joseph Haydn, 1783
- Cello Concerto No. 2 (Lindberg) by Magnus Lindberg, 2013
- Cello Concerto No. 2 (Saint-Saëns) in D minor (Op. 119) by Camille Saint-Saëns, 1902
- Cello Concerto No. 2 (Shostakovich) (Op. 126) by Dmitri Shostakovich, 1966
- Cello Concerto No. 2 (Villa-Lobos) (W516) by Heitor Villa-Lobos, 1953

== See also ==
- Cello Concerto (disambiguation)
- Cello Concerto No. 1 (disambiguation)
