= Louise Behrend =

American violinist (1916–2011)

Louise Behrend (October 3, 1916 – August 3, 2011) was an American violinist and academic. She was dedicated to the Suzuki method of teaching, and founded the Suzuki-based School for Strings.

== Life ==
Louise Behrend was born in 1916 in Washington, D.C.; her father was a doctor and amateur pianist, and her mother was a mathematics teacher. She studied at the Juilliard School with Louis Persinger, and on gaining a graduate diploma in 1943 she was invited to join the school's Pre-College Violin Music and Chamber Music faculties.

Shinichi Suzuki, creator of the Suzuki method of violin teaching, visited the Juilliard School in 1964, with some of his students, and subsequently Behrend went to Japan, spending two weeks in Matsumoto to see Suzuki's summer classes. In 1970 she started a Suzuki course in Manhattan. This expanded and in 1973, when it had more than 50 students, it was named The School for Strings, with Behrend as director; it still exists today.

She was editor of the American Suzuki Journal from 1984 to 1988, and wrote The Suzuki Approach (1988). She was on the faculties of the Henry Street Music School Settlement, New York University and the Manhattan School of Music.

In 1996 the Suzuki Association of the Americas gave her a Distinguished Service Award; in 2003 she received the Betty Allen Award from the Chamber Music Society of Lincoln Center; in 2007 she received the Paul Rolland Lifetime Achievement Award from the New England Conservatory of Music.

Behrend remained on the faculty of the Juilliard School until retirement in 2009. She died in 2011, aged 94.
