= Francesco von Mendelssohn =

German-born cellist, writer, actor, director, art collector (1901–1972)

- Born: Franz von Mendelssohn; 6 September 1901; Berlin, Germany
- Died: 22 September 1972 (aged 71); New York City
- Occupations: Cellist, art collector, actor, theatre director

Francesco von Mendelssohn (born Franz von Mendelssohn; 6 September 1901 – 22 September 1972) was a German cellist and art collector. He also became known during the 1920s as a stage actor and theater director. He acquired additional notability with a lifestyle that some found eccentric.

== Biography ==
=== Family provenance and early years ===
He was born in Berlin. His great-great-great-grandfather, the philosopher Moses Mendelssohn (1729–1786), had become the ancestor of a prominent dynasty of bankers and musicians, notably Felix Mendelssohn and his sister Fanny Mendelssohn, who were thereby Franz's first cousins three times removed (generationally).

Franz von Mendelssohn, who later Italianised his first name, was the son of the banker Robert von Mendelssohn and his young wife Giulietta Gordigiani. She was a daughter of the fashionable Florentine portraitist Michele Gordigiani. After her husband died in 1917 and her daughter Eleonora married pianist Edwin Fischer, she moved to Italy with her daughter Angelica von Mendelssohn. In 1923 she met the cellist Gaspar Cassadó, who was 26 years younger than she was, with whom she lived for more than 30 years. Francesco stayed in the large family home at Königsallee 16 in Berlin's Grunewald quarter, next to a very large number of Mendelssohn cousins in Berlin. The house contained numerous antiquities and, most notably, the large art collection that Robert von Mendelssohn had built up. This included works by Guardi, Goya and Rubens. There were also two paintings attributed at that time to Rembrandt: a self-portrait and a portrait of Hendrickje Stoffels (after Mendelssohn's death re-attributed to the "school of Rembrandt" and with doubts about its attribution). From 1910 Robert von Mendelssohn had aggressively and presciently expanded the collection, selecting works by Pablo Picasso, Vincent van Gogh, Max Slevogt, Édouard Manet and Claude Monet.

Francesco showed a similarly sure touch in his selection, buying works by Toulouse-Lautrec, Segantini and Camille Corot. His greater love was for music and the theatre, however. As a pupil of Pablo Casals and Arthur Williams he became a professional cellist. He became a solo performer, and was also, at different rimes, a member of the Busch quartet and of the Klingler quartet. Reflecting the large social network of which the Mendelssohns were at the heart, members of Berlin's intellectual elite with whom he played chamber music in private included Albert Einstein.

He also wrote a book about Eleonora Duse, who was a friend of his mother's and his sister's God mother. He translated the plays of Luigi Pirandello from Italian, at the same time working as a movie actor and as a theatre director. Co-stars included Lotte Lenya, Peter Lorre, Fritz Kortner, Theo Lingen, Heinz Rühmann and Paul Hörbiger.

Among social commentators Francesco von Mendelssohn became known as an eccentric. He drove a white Lancia cabriolet in which the seat covers were made of ermine, and often appeared in public wearing a red leather suit or a yellow silk dressing gown. With his friend Ruth Landshoff he liked to turn up wearing an evening dress, while she, as his partner, wore his suit. In his parents' house in Grunewald he held high-profile social events at which leading figures from the arts and politics mingled with men from the gay community. His close friends included Harald Kreutzberg, Vladimir Horowitz und Gustaf Gründgens. His various lovers are believed to have included Ruth Landshoff.

=== Emigration ===
The Mendelssohns were baptised as Christians but, as racist sentiment increased in Germany, they were widely perceived as Jewish. After the Nazis came to power in January 1933, the Mendelssohns were persecuted as Jews. It became apparent that the antisemitism of the Nazi Party in opposition was no mere empty threat, even though a Christian baptism might be regarded by some as sufficient protection against the rising threat of state persecution. The von Mendelssohn siblings emigrated. While Eleonora, who at this point was married to an Austrian, moved back to Castle Kammer, in Upper Austria, and not far from Salzburg. Francesco von Mendelssohn stayed away from German speaking central Europe, spending most of the time between 1933 and 1935 in Paris. He also took the opportunity to extend and deepen his contacts in the United States. As early as April 1933 he staged Brecht's The Threepenny Opera at the Empire Theater on Broadway. It was the work's US premiere, but the production was not a success, closing after twelve nights.

Francesco von Mendelssohn spent the summer of 1935 in Venice and then, travelling with Eleonora, Lotte Lenya, Kurt Weill and the impresario Meyer Weisgal, set sail in September from Cherbourg aboard the Majestic, in order to start a new life in New York City. Here he worked as a production assistant with Max Reinhardt. Initially he lived in hotels in New York. Later he acquired a house in 83rd Street where he resumed his habit of throwing lavish parties for members of the artistic elite. He moved briefly to Hollywood, but by 1937 was back in New York. His work on a production of The Eternal Road by Franz Werfel and Kurt Weill led to a falling out with Reinhardt in 1937.

The massive fortune that the von Mendelssohn siblings had inherited from their banker father was greatly diminished by the anti-semitic measures imposed by Nazis that accompanied in their emigration, but they remained wealthy by most standards and were able to provide financial support to other refugees. Eleanora had been able to take part of the art collection to Austria when she moved there, and they had also managed to convey the two supposed Rembrandt paintings to Christoph Bernoulli, the Basel art dealer, leaving at the Mendelssohn Bank in Berlin some copies that their grandfather had had made. However, fearing government reprisals if the switch was noticed, a cousin persuaded them to have the real pictures returned to Germany where Alfred Hentzen arranged for them to be lodged with the central bank in order to prevent their sale abroad. Ownership of the works, at this point, rested with Francesco's mother, Giulietta von Mendelssohn. In the end she decided to have them sold, entrusting the transaction to the family's agent, Aldo Cima. He arranged for the sale of most of the Mendelssohn art collection through the Austrian dealer, Otto Schatzker.

Francesco von Mendelssohn had a history of melancholy that predated his emigration, and in his American exile he became a high level depressive, also suffering badly from alcoholism after 1937. Bernoulli portrayed him at this time as childish, probably afflicted with syphilis alongside his other ailments, and badly in need of serious therapy if he were to pull through. During the next few years he was a patient in a series of clinics, and also frequently found himself detained in various prison cells after becoming involved in "incidents" and fights.

=== Seeking restitution ===
The end of World War II and of Nazi Germany raised the possibility of restitution following the loss of the von Mendelssohn art collection. Francesco was no longer in any state to attend to the matter, and it was left to his sister Eleonora to travel to Europe to try and recover the lost art works. After Aldo Cima's suggestion that she should bribe the museum directors had been rejected, she sought to achieve restitution through a combination of appeals for reimbursement and attempts to buy some of the paintings back. One problem that she faced was that the paintings had been the property of her mother, Giulietta von Mendelssohn, who had been classified as an Aryan. It was therefore not possible to demonstrate that she had been forced to give up the collection as a result of race-based persecution. In the end her application for restitution was rejected by the German authorities in 1953, but by this time Eleonora von Mendelssohn was no longer in a position to know of it. In January 1951 her (fourth) husband, Martin Kosleck fell out of an apartment window and was badly injured. At about the same time, her brother Francesco suffered a stroke following a fight and arrest. Eleonora von Mendelssohn was found dead on 24 January 1951. The evidence suggested suicide.

Eleonora von Mendelssohn left substantial debts. Francesco von Mendelssohn, with help from his sister's executrix, Lillian D. Rock, made another attempt to recover the pictures from he Mendelssohn collection. He now asserted that their mother had gifted the pictures to Eleonora and himself on New Year's Eve in 1932. Albert Einstein, by now an international celebrity, spoke out in support of Mendelssohn's claim. But the authorities were unmoved. The portrait of Hendrickje Stoffels attributed to Rembrandt, which had been purchased for the "Fuhrer Museum" in Linz, was handed over by the US occupying forces to the Munich-based Treuhandverwaltung (public trusteeship administration). After Mendelssohn's claim for restitution had been rejected it was loaned by the West German government to the Alte Pinakothek art gallery in Munich and then, in 1967, transferred to the Städel institute in Frankfurt. The 1652 Rembrandt Self-portrait in a fur coat with gold chain and earring had been sold through Schatzker to the Kunsthistorisches Museum in Vienna: it is still there.

After the first rejection of the case based on Francesco von Mendelssohn's belated recollection concerning the alleged transfer of ownership from their mother to her children back in 1932, Lillian Rock, his sister's executrix withdrew from the case. Later, at a public hearing on the matter held before the district court in Vienna, no one turned up to represent the Mendelssohn family's position, and their application was again rejected.

=== Final years ===
Francesco von Mendelssohn had been in no position to appear at that hearing on his own behalf. He spent a period as an inmate at a psychiatric clinic in White Plains, New York. There are contemporary reports that he may have undergone a lobotomy, possibly in order to protect him from the further clutches of the justice system. His central nervous system and intellectual faculties had apparently been damaged by his chronic alcoholism. In 1957 he came under the care of Lilly Wittels, widow of the psychiatrist Fritz Wittels. He visited Vienna in 1960: friends from former times found him utterly transformed and uninterested. In his final years he broke off contact with former friends. In 1972 he was found to be suffering from an advanced case of liver cancer, and he died on 22 September 1972. Only a few people attended his burial. As Alice Bernoulli wrote in a letter to her friend Salka Viertel on 10 October 1972, "No wonder, that ... most of his old friends found him too dull after his total character change, and left him alone. A sad end. But what a chapter in our lives!!"

== See also ==
- List of claims for restitution for Nazi-looted art
- The Holocaust in Germany
- History of the Jews in Germany
