= Suzuki method =

Music teaching method

Shinichi Suzuki leading a group class.

The Suzuki method—known in Japan as Talent Education (才能教育, Sainō Kyōiku) or the Mother-Tongue Method—is a mid-20th-century music curriculum and teaching method created by Japanese violinist and pedagogue Shinichi Suzuki (1898–1998). The method is based on the premise that any child capable of acquiring fluency in their native language can develop high-level musical ability if provided with an appropriate environment, daily listening, and structured repetition.

== Background ==
The Suzuki method was developed by Shinichi Suzuki, the son of Japanese violin manufacturer Masakichi Suzuki. After studying violin in Tokyo with Kō Andō and spending eight years in Berlin under Karl Klingler—where he also became acquainted with physicist and amateur violinist Albert Einstein—Suzuki began experimenting with teaching young children in Tokyo around 1931–1932.

Suzuki observed that children effortlessly acquire their native language, including complex regional dialects, through immersion and imitation. Reasoning that musical aptitude is not an inborn gift ("Law of Ability") but a capacity nurtured through environmental stimulation, he pioneered teaching the violin to preschool-aged children using scaled-down instruments and small incremental steps. He emphasized that the primary goal of Talent Education was to cultivate moral character and "noble hearts" rather than solely training professional prodigies.

== Philosophy ==
Suzuki's educational philosophy—referred to as the "mother-tongue" method—models music instruction on natural language acquisition, emphasizing character development ("character first, ability second") alongside musical skill. Its core components include:

- Immersion in a musical environment: Attending concerts, interacting with fellow students, and listening daily to recordings of the repertoire from birth.
- Non-selective admission (no auditions): Avoiding musical aptitude tests or entrance auditions for beginners, on the principle that every child can develop musical ability.
- Early start: Beginning musical exposure in infancy and formal instrumental lessons typically between ages three and five.
- Parental involvement: Parents attend lessons, take notes, and supervise daily home practice—often learning the rudiments of the instrument first—an aspect occasionally termed the "Mom-Centric Method" in U.S. media.
- Learning music by ear before note reading: Just as children speak before learning to read, students learn posture, intonation, and phrasing aurally through model recordings before musical notation is introduced.
- Memorization and cumulative review: Students perform solo repertoire from memory and continuously review previously mastered pieces to refine technique rather than relying on mechanical etudes in early stages.
- Group lessons and non-competitive performance: Regular group classes, unison playing, and frequent recitals foster peer motivation and mutual encouragement.
- Teacher training: Ongoing pedagogical training programs administered by regional Suzuki associations worldwide.

== Technique and mediated pedagogy ==
Although Suzuki was a violinist, his pedagogy centers on general musical and cognitive principles rather than a single national school of violin technique.

- Tonalization: Coined by Suzuki by analogy with vocal vocalization, tonalization refers to daily exercises aimed at producing and recognizing a resonant, singing tone quality on the instrument. Outside the Suzuki method, this corresponds to traditional "tone production".
- Mediated learning with sound recordings: Music education historian Matthew D. Thibeault identifies the Suzuki method as the first widespread instrumental pedagogy in which sound recordings functioned as a central teaching medium. Between 1947 and 1954, Suzuki recorded the early violin repertoire on 78-rpm discs accompanied by his sister-in-law Shizuko Suzuki (with higher volumes recorded by Koji Toyoda), later expanding to LPs, cassette tapes in the 1970s, and digital formats. Recordings provide an "inner tonal image" at home, while Suzuki also used student graduation tapes—listening to over 5,000 recordings annually by the 1970s—to diagnose posture and bowing issues solely by ear.
- Scaled instruments: Fractional-sized stringed instruments (down to 1/16 size), curved-headjoint flutes with displaced keys, and adjustable benches enable children as young as three to maintain proper posture.
- Suzuki Institutes and common repertoire: Short-term intensive festivals—originating in Matsumoto and adopted internationally—combine masterclasses, group repertoire classes, and teacher training around a shared core repertoire.

== Repertoire ==
The core Suzuki literature is published as graded sheet music volumes accompanied by reference recordings for each instrument, introducing technical skills through melodic pieces rather than isolated exercises.

=== Violin ===
The violin method was compiled and edited by Suzuki in ten volumes, beginning with Suzuki's Variations on "Twinkle, Twinkle, Little Star" and concluding with two Mozart concertos.

The first three volumes consist primarily of graded arrangements of folk tunes and works by composers such as Bach, Dvořák, Beethoven, Handel, Paganini, Boccherini, and Brahms, alongside several original compositions by Suzuki in Volume 1. Volumes 4 to 10 present standard student solo repertoire by Seitz, Vivaldi, Bach, Veracini, Corelli, Dittersdorf, Rameau, Handel, Mozart, and Fiocco.

The International Suzuki Association has undertaken ongoing revisions of the violin volumes, accompanied by regional supplemental repertoire lists recommending works by Bach, Kreisler, Elgar, Bartók, Shostakovich, and Copland for Volumes 6 to 8.

Complete or partial official recordings have been made by Suzuki, Koji Toyoda, David Nadien, David Cerone, William Preucil Jr., Takako Nishizaki (for Naxos Records in 2008), and Hilary Hahn (Volumes 1–3, released in 2020). Volumes 9 and 10 feature Mozart's Violin Concerto No. 5 in A major and Violin Concerto No. 4 in D major.

=== Viola ===
The viola method was compiled and edited by Doris Preucil in nine volumes. The first three volumes are transposed largely from the early violin volumes, while Volumes 4 to 9 introduce standard viola literature by Telemann, Casadesus, Bach, Mendelssohn, Vivaldi, Leclair, Hummel, and Bruch, introducing shifting earlier to prepare students for ensemble playing. Recordings of the first four volumes were made by William Preucil.

=== Cello ===
The cello method spans ten volumes, beginning with arrangements from the early violin repertoire and progressing to works by Vivaldi, Saint-Saëns, Popper, Bréval, Goltermann, Squire, Bach, Paradis, Eccles, Fauré, van Goens, Sammartini, Haydn, and Boccherini. Volumes 1 to 4 were recorded by Tsuyoshi Tsutsumi.

=== Piano ===
The piano method comprises seven volumes, compiled in collaboration with Shizuko Suzuki. Volume 1 opens with Variations on "Twinkle, Twinkle, Little Star" and folk melodies, progressing through Baroque minuets (Volume 2), Muzio Clementi's Sonatina in C Major, Op. 36, No. 1 (Volume 3), Beethoven's Sonata in G Major, Op. 49, No. 2 and Bach's Partita in B-flat (Volume 4), Beethoven's "Für Elise" and Haydn's Sonata in C Major, Hob. XVI/35 (Volume 5), Mozart's Sonata in C Major, K. 545 (Volume 6), and Mozart's Sonata in A Major, K. 331, Handel's "The Harmonious Blacksmith", and Bartók's Romanian Folk Dances (Volume 7). The New International Edition added works by Burgmüller, Tchaikovsky, Chopin, Grieg, Granados, Villa-Lobos, and Debussy, with revised recordings of Volumes 4 to 7 by Seizo Azuma.

=== Other instruments ===
- Double bass: Five published volumes (with nine planned), edited by S. Daniel Swaim, Virginia Dixon, Michael Fanelli, Domenick Fiore, and Eugene Rebeck, incorporating arrangements from the violin books alongside works by Handel, Gossec, Beethoven, Bach, Saint-Saëns, and Dvořák.
- Flute: Fourteen volumes compiled and edited by Toshio Takahashi, progressing from beginner melodies to works by Bach, Handel, Blavet, Fauré, Quantz, Cimarosa, Ibert, Mozart, and Otaka.
- Recorder: Eight volumes for soprano and alto recorder, covering Renaissance and Baroque repertoire and ornamentation.
- Classical guitar: Nine volumes edited by Frank Longay, spanning folk tunes, Renaissance lute transcriptions, and works by Sanz, Vivaldi, Bach, Carcassi, Giuliani, Sor, Tárrega, Albéniz, and Mudarra, recorded by Longay, Bill Kossler, Seth Himmelhoch, Andrew LaFrenier, Louis Brown, George Sakellariou, William Kanengiser, and Scott Tennant.
- Harp: Five volumes suitable for pedal or lever harp.
- Voice: Five levels developed in Finland since 1986 and taught across Europe, the Americas, Asia, and Oceania.
- Pipe organ: Eight volumes compiled and edited by Gunilla Rönnberg and Lars Hagström starting in 1998.
- Trumpet: Recognized by the International Suzuki Association in 2011, with European teacher training introduced in 2013.

=== Early childhood education (SECE) and school programs ===
The Suzuki Early Childhood Education (SECE) curriculum, designed for children aged 0–3, integrates singing, nursery rhymes, percussion, and movement in parent-child group classes prior to formal instrumental study. Suzuki also applied his philosophy to general preschool education at Yōji Gakuen in Matsumoto (founded in 1949) and collaborated with Sony co-founder Masaru Ibuka's Early Development Association, inspiring adaptations such as Susan Grilli's Suzuki Pre-School in New York City (founded in 1974).

== Historical notes ==
Following the opening of Japan to Western trade during the Meiji period, Masakichi Suzuki transitioned from making shamisen to establishing the Suzuki Violin Factory in Nagoya. Around age 17, Shinichi Suzuki taught himself to play the violin by imitating a gramophone recording of Franz Schubert's Ave Maria performed by Mischa Elman, before moving to Tokyo in 1920 to study with Kō Andō and subsequently spending eight years in Berlin with Karl Klingler. While in Berlin, he married German soprano Waltraud Prange in 1928.

At the end of World War II in 1945, Suzuki relocated to Matsumoto and launched the Talent Education movement, which grew into the Talent Education Research Institute (TERI). Early graduates from his studio included Toshiya Etō, Koji Toyoda, and Hidetaro Suzuki (later concertmaster of the Indianapolis Symphony Orchestra).

In 1958, a film of Suzuki's annual Tokyo mass concert was screened at Oberlin College, prompting John Kendall of Southern Illinois University Edwardsville to visit Matsumoto in 1959 and publish the first English-language adaptation, Listen and Play (1961). In March 1964, Suzuki and ten Japanese students toured sixteen U.S. cities, performing for the Music Educators National Conference (MENC) in Philadelphia. Other early pioneers in the United States included Clifford Cook, Roland and Almita Vamos, Elizabeth and Harlow Mills, Betty Haag, Louise Behrend, Dorothy Roffman, William Starr, Anastasia Jempelis, and Margery Aber. Regional oversight is coordinated by the International Suzuki Association (founded in 1983) alongside the Asia Suzuki Association, Suzuki Association of the Americas, European Suzuki Association, and Pan-Pacific Suzuki Association.

== Reception and critical debate ==
The reception of the Suzuki method outside Japan has generated sustained pedagogical and philosophical discussion:

- Imitation, note reading, and individuality: Several Western musicians, psychologists, and musicologists—including violinist Isaac Stern, psychologist Howard Gardner, and musicologist Robert Fink—have criticized the method's intensive reliance on repeating a single model recording, arguing that it risks fostering mechanical imitation over sight-reading and individual artistic interpretation. Even U.S. pioneer John Kendall cautioned against overusing recordings in advanced repertoire, persuading Suzuki in 1988 to discontinue public group recitals performed to taped accompaniments beyond Volume 4.
- Cultural context and philosophical articulation: Scholars of music education note that Suzuki's emphasis on recorded models and group unison aligns with traditional Japanese arts pedagogy centered on kata (learning through a set model form). While philosopher Estelle Jorgensen warned that some teachers apply Suzuki's techniques by rote without examining their underlying assumptions, music education scholar Karin S. Hendricks has argued that Suzuki's philosophy—which she characterizes as "Music Education as Love Education"—is rooted in a Zen-influenced praxial tradition in which philosophical principles are articulated primarily through action ("act when you think") and moral character development rather than Western analytical treatises.

== See also ==
- Blanche Ray Alden
- Shinichi Suzuki

== Sources ==
- Barber, Barbara (Autumn 1991). "Traditional & Suzuki Teaching: A Comparison". American String Teacher.
- Bradley, Jane (Spring 2005). "When to Twinkle – Are Children Ever Too Young?". American Suzuki Journal. 33 (3): 53.
- Campbell, Don (2000). The Mozart Effect for Children. New York: HarperCollins. ISBN 0-380-97782-6.
- Grilli, Susan (1987). Preschool in the Suzuki Spirit. Harcourt Brace Jovanovich Japan. ISBN 0-15-673830-9.
- Hendricks, Karin S. (Fall 2011). "The Philosophy of Shinichi Suzuki: "Music Education as Love Education"". Philosophy of Music Education Review. 19 (2): 136–154. doi:10.2979/philmusieducrevi.19.2.136.
- Hermann, Evelyn (1981). Shinichi Suzuki: The Man and His Philosophy. Summy-Birchard Inc. ISBN 0-87487-589-7.
- Kreitman, Edward (1998). Teaching from the Balance Point: A Guide for Suzuki Teachers, Parents, and Students. Western Springs School of Talent Education Publications.
- Suzuki, Shinichi (1983) [1969]. Nurtured by Love: The Classic Approach to Talent Education. Translated by Waltraud Suzuki (2nd ed.). Summy-Birchard Inc. ISBN 0-87487-584-6.
- Suzuki, Shinichi (1981). Ability Development from Age Zero. Translated by Mary Louise Nagata. Summy-Birchard Inc. ISBN 0-87487-580-3.
- Suzuki, Shinichi (1998). Shinichi Suzuki: His Speeches and Essays. Summy-Birchard Inc. ISBN 0-87487-588-9.
- Tanaka, Shigeki (2002). Everything Depends on How We Raise Them: Educating Young Children by the Suzuki Method. Translated by Kyoko Selden. Summy-Birchard Inc. ISBN 0-87487-999-X.
- Thibeault, Matthew D. (April 2018). "Learning With Sound Recordings: A History of Suzuki's Mediated Pedagogy". Journal of Research in Music Education. 66 (1): 6–30. doi:10.1177/0022429418756879.
