= Concerto (disambiguation) =

A concerto is a musical work generally composed of three parts or movements, in which, usually, one solo instrument is accompanied by an orchestra.

Concerto or Concertos may also refer to:

== Music ==
- Concerto (Barraqué), 1962–1968 composition by Jean Barraqué
- Concerto: One Night in Central Park, an album by Andrea Bocelli
- Concertos (album), a 1997 album by Michael Nyman
- Concerto (Rondò Veneziano album), 1988
- Concerto (Roxy Music album) (1979)
- Concertos, an album by Michael Mantler
- Concerto, an album by Vincenzo Zitello

== Other uses ==
- "Concerto" (The Avengers), twenty-fourth episode of the third series of The Avengers
- Concerto (ballet), a 1966 ballet by Kenneth MacMillan
- Concerto (manga), a Japanese yuri manga
- Concerto (TV series), a Canadian music television miniseries
- Compaq Concerto, a hybrid subnotebook and personal digital assistant released by Compaq in 1993
- Honda Concerto, a Honda hatchback related to the Rover 200
- Concerto Signage, an open source digital signage system
