= Koji Toyoda =

Japanese classical musician (born 1933)

- Born: Koji Toyoda; 1 September 1933 (age 92); Tokyo, Japan
- Genres: Classical
- Occupations: Violinist, pedagogue, composer
- Instrument: Violin

Koji Toyoda is a Japanese classical musician. He was born in Hamamatsu in 1933.

== Biography ==
Violinists Toshiya Eto and Koji Toyoda were amongst the first students of the famous music educator Shinichi Suzuki after he returned to Japan from studying in Germany. At that time, Koji Toyoda was only three and a half. During World War II, his studies with Suzuki were discontinued when Koji was evacuated from Tokyo. After losing both parents during the war, Koji stayed with his uncle and worked at a sake shop. Post war efforts of Suzuki to locate his student by radio announcement brought Koji under Suzuki's care. He continued his studies at the Conservatoire national supérieur in Paris where he studied with Professor Benedetti. He graduated there with a diploma in six months in order to study with George Enescu, as suggested by his former teacher Suzuki. By this time Enescu was very old and weak, and died 30 months after he started teaching Koji. Later, Koji heard Arthur Grumiaux play at a concert and decided to pursue his teaching. He has then become one of Grumiaux' best students, together with another Japanese violinist, Tomiko Shida.

He received the Bach Medal of the Harriet Cohen International Music Award in London and also awards at international competitions in Paris, Brussels, and Geneva's Concours International d'Exécution Musicale.

He was the concertmaster of the Deutsches Symphonie-Orchester Berlin from 1962 to 1979, a professor at the Berlin University of the Arts from 1979 to 2000, as well as one of the founders and the first music director of the Kusatsu International Summer Music Academy and Festival, and the director of the Gunma Symphony Orchestra. He assumed the presidency of the Talent Education Research Institute, (Suzuki method) after Shinichi Suzuki died in 1998. Some of his compositions are published by the Zen-on Music Publishing Co., Japan.
