= Karl Klingler =

German musician (1879–1971)

- Born: 7 December 1879; Strasbourg, Alsace–Lorraine, German Empire
- Died: 18 March 1971 (aged 91); Munich, Bavaria, West Germany
- Education: Berlin University of the Arts
- Occupations: violin virtuoso concertmaster composer music professor
- Spouse: Margarethe von Gwinner (1888–1973)
- Children: Arthur, Wolfgang, Marianne, Charlotte

Karl Klingler (7 December 1879 – 18 March 1971) was a German violinist, concertmaster, composer, music teacher and lecturer.

== Life ==
=== Early years ===
Karl Klingler was born in Strasbourg, at that time in Germany, the fifth of his parents' six recorded children. His father, Theodor Klingler (1845–1905), was a professional viola player who taught at the conservatory there. When he was still very young Klingler was receiving violin lessons from his father, and then from his father's colleague at the conservatory, Heinrich Schuster. Klingler began giving concerts at five years of age. In 1897, when he concluded his schooling in Strasbourg, he relocated to Berlin where he was a student at the Berlin University of the Arts (Universität der Künste Berlin, UdK) where, now aged 17, he studied the violin with Joseph Joachim, an inspiring teacher and, very soon, a close personal friend. For composition he was taught by Max Bruch and Robert Kahn. In 1899, still aged only 19, he won the Mendelssohn Scholarship.

=== Early success ===
He joined the Berlin Philharmonic in 1901. In (or before) 1904 he was appointed the orchestra's deputy concertmaster (Zweiter Konzertmeister), serving under Arthur Nikisch. At the same time he was playing the viola in the Joachim Quartet, founded back in 1869 by Klingler's friend and former teacher, Joseph Joachim. He accordingly acquired a high-profile among Berlin's top musicians while still in his early 20s. In addition, while still only 23, in 1903 he took on a violin class at the university, where in 1908 he was appointed to a regular teaching post and in 1910 became a full professor, "King of Prussia Professor" (in succession to Joseph Joachim). Broken only by his military service during the World War I, Klingler's teaching career at the UdK lasted more than 30 years, concluding in 1936. Along with performing and teaching, he also turned his talents to composition, producing songs, chamber music and a violin concerto which he premiered with the Berlin Philharmonic in 1907.

He succeeded in getting hold of a Stradivarius violin – the "De Barrau/Joachim" (1715) – which many years before had been owned by Joachim. During the years before the war, he was receiving glowing reviews from the critics, notably in the United States in 1911 for a performance of Beethoven's Triple Concerto with the Welsh cellist Arthur Williams and the Galician pianist Artur Schnabel.

His career was interrupted in July 1914 by the outbreak of the First World War: he was called up to fight as a soldier. Towards the end of the war he was able to transfer to musical work in support of the troops. He arranged regular musical evenings at his house in the Sophienstraße (today the Bellstraße), with fellow musicians such as Korngold, Wilhelm Kempff and Emil von Reznicek. In 1917 he married Margarethe von Gwinner, daughter of the well connected banker-aristocrat Arthur von Gwinner. The couple had four children, Arthur, Wolfgang, Marianne and Charlotte, born between 1918 and 1926.

=== Shinichi Suzuki ===
In 1920 Klingler was sought out by a young Japanese musician called Shinichi Suzuki. For the next eight years Klingler taught Suzuki, for the first four years covering etudes and concertos, and for the next four years covering chamber music. Klingler had let it be known that did not normally extend his activities to private tuition, and accordingly Suzuki became his only private pupil. In this way, Klingler had a direct and positive influence on the Suzuki method of violin teaching.

=== Nazi years ===
Régime change in January 1933 ushered in a new intrusive style of government in Germany. Racism and strident antisemitism which had been a feature of Nazi propaganda during the previous decade were now progressively and rapidly integrated into daily life. Klingler was not naturally drawn towards Nazi attitudes, and in 1933 it was noted at the University of the Arts where he still taught that he did not adopt the habit of exchanging [[Nazi salute|Heil Hitler greetings]]. His wife was identified as "half-Jewish" (Halbjüdin) and he himself as "Jewish interrelated" (jüdisch versippt), which may have been a reference to his Jewish teacher, Joseph Joachim. He nevertheless managed to sustain a public career in music for several years after the Nazi takeover. He participated in the activities of the Militant League for German Culture (Kampfbund für deutsche Kultur (KfdK)). He was recruited by Richard Strauss to a senior administrative role within the Reich Chamber of Music (Reichsmusikkammer). As a former president of the "German League of Concert Artists" he must have been familiar with the politicised music policy of these and other culture based institutions when he involved himself in them.

Despite holding office inside the musical establishment, Klingler came under growing political pressure. A case in point was the cellist Ernst Silberstein who was a member of the Klingler string quartet. Klingler received a succession of warnings and threats from Joseph Goebbels, the Reich Ministry of Public Enlightenment and Propaganda, probably backed up by communications from Herbert Gerigk, the top music administrator in Nazi Germany: The Jewish cellist must be replaced. Klingler had actually met Adolf Hitler, albeit briefly, at a musical event set up by President Hindenburg back in March 1934, and now he wrote personally to Hitler, a letter dated 22 November 1934, hoping that the leader would be appreciative of the artistic and German qualities of the Klingler Quartet including its Jewish cellist. Silberstein continued to play the cello in the quartet till its final appearance on 17 March 1936 despite opposition from the Propaganda Ministry, thanks to a succession of "Special Permits" issued by the Reich Chamber of Culture (Reichskulturkammer). Nevertheless, between 1933 and 1936 the quartet's performances were greatly diminished in number, and revenues were more precarious than before 1933.

On 9 March 1936, in the presence of several students, Klingler protested at the university when he discovered that a bust of his (Jewish) mentor, Joseph Joachim, had been removed. At this point the university management suggested early retirement: his retirement on "health grounds" was accepted on 7 April 1936. Between 1 May 1936 and the end of the war he was in receipt of a modest civil service pension. It was probably on the recommendation of the university director, Fritz Stein, that directly following his retirement Klingler went abroad with his wife and daughters, staying for several months in Arosa, Switzerland, where, according to recollections shared later by his daughter, Charlotte von Contas, he grew a beard in order to avoid being recognised.

Back in Germany, and served with a travel ban, he went into "internal emigration". He was able to devote himself to composition, producing a large work for choir, soloist and piano. He formed a friendship with the physicist Max Planck: the two of them engaged in deep discussions concerning certain problems in geometry. Nevertheless, Klingler was not completely written out of public life. In January 1938 he performed in a trio with his elder brother Fridolin Klingler and the flautist Gustav Scheck at a chamber music evening organised by the Bremen Philharmonic Society. In May 1940 he was issued with a "Special Permit" on "artistic grounds" from the National Culture Agency, but it is not clear from surviving sources what the permit was for. There is mention in one source of his having been "used for much-needed troop entertainment".

In 1943 the family home in Berlin was rendered uninhabitable by an air raid and the Klinglers moved permanently to the small country estate at Krumke, just outside Osterburg (Altmark), which Margarethe had inherited after her father died in 1931. While they were living here, Klingler's desk was searched by the Gestapo and he was interrogated about his friends Max Planck and Erich Vagts. His address book was confiscated: it included contact details for his friend's son Erwin Planck, who around this time was sentenced to death for involvement in the 20 July plot to assassinate the Führer. According to testimony of former local government officials, Klingler's mail was subject to police monitoring while he was living in Krumke. As the war drew to an end, he became the subject of a Gestapo arrest warrant because he was identified as a flight risk, but the warrant could not be executed before the area was over-run by allied forces as the war ended formally in May 1945.

=== Twilight years ===
As the war ended the family home at Krumke was requisitioned and had to be vacated, first to accommodate US, then British soldiers. By June 1945 the region was being administered as part of the Soviet occupation zone. The country estate was permanently confiscated under the auspices of the land reforms in East Germany and it was converted for use as a tuberculosis sanatorium. The Klinglers had managed to move briefly to a little forest house, having rescued some of their furniture and necessities. In June they managed to make their way to nearby Gartow where they were accommodated in a house owned by the von Bernstoff family. A month later they reached Kirchrode on the southside of Hanover where they were reunited with their son, Wolfgang, recently released from a stint as a prisoner of war. The Klinglers' other son, Arthur, had also survived. In Hanover Karl Klingler recruited some former students, Agnes Ritter, Friedrich Hausmann and Otto Garvens, to reform the Klingler String Quartet, but by this time Karl Klingler himself was past retirement age.

In Autumn 1949 Karl Klingler relocated with his family from Hanover to Munich. He was still able to write chamber music, and also published some prose books on musical themes. Ernst Silberstein had emigrated to the United States, and although they continued to correspond, they never saw one another again. Karl Klingler died a few months after of his 91st birthday on 18 March 1971. Until very shortly before his death he continued to play sonatas regularly with his wife, and chamber music with family and friends.

== Klingler Quartet ==
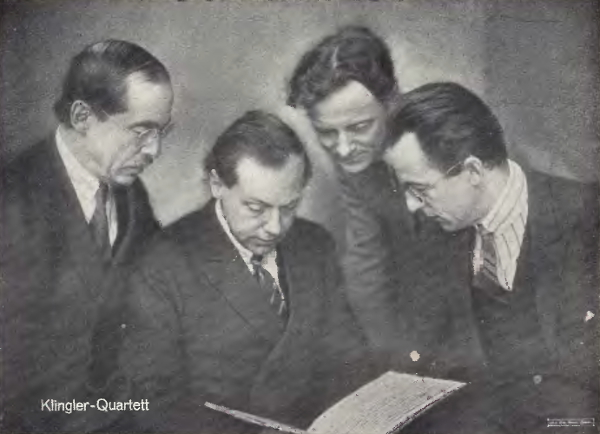
Klingler Quartet

The Klingler Quartet was founded in 1905 with the express purpose of recreating and preserving the tone quality and musical style of the legendary Joachim Quartet. The violinists were Karl Klingler himself and the Russian Josef Rywkind. Karl Klingler's brother Fridolin played the viola and the cellist was the Welshman Arthur Williams. Williams' teacher, Robert Hausmann, who had for many years played in the Joachim Quartet was also recruited as an advisor, ensuring, with Klingler himself, that the quartet's approach remained true to that of the Joachim Quartet, down to the tiniest detail. During the First World War, the quartet had to be dissolved because two of its four members were from countries that were at war with Germany.

After peace returned in 1918 Klingler resumed the tradition of the Klingler Quartet, now with the second violin parts taken by Richard Heber and Max Baldner playing the cello. Baldner's seat was taken by Francesco von Mendelssohn in 1926. Just like the Joachim Quartet, which on account of the qualities of its tone and style had been identified as one of the best strong quartets in the world, its spiritual successor, the Klingler Quartet, confirmed its own status by producing some of the best recordings of the day.

The Nazi years found another "non-Aryan" in the cellist's seat. On the invitation of President Hindenburg, in March 1934 the Klingler Quartet, including the cellist Ernst Silberstein, performed in the presence of Adolf Hitler. In 1936 Klingler refused to submit to pressure to substitute an "Aryan" cellist for Silberstein, and the now world-famous Klingler Quartet instead "resigned".

After the twelve Nazi years came to an end, the Klingler Quartet was reborn, now featuring Klingler together with three former pupils, Agnes Ritter, Friedrich Hausmann and Otto Garvens. However, with Klingler himself past retirement age, the quartet was unable to match its pre-war traditions.

== Legacy ==
Chamber music comprises the focus of Karl Klingler's artistic legacy. This is evident, above all, from the recordings produced by the Klingler Quartet between 1905 and 1936, featuring a classical core repertoire built around the middle period and later string quartets of Beethoven, but also extending to more recent composers, notably Max Reger. In terms of interpretation, Klingler's aim had been to continue the qualities and traditions established by the Joachim Quartet. The critic Alexander Berrsche believed that he had succeeded, describing the quartet as "one of the few genuine Beethoven interpreters of our time". After the publication of Klingler's essay "On the fundamentals of violin playing" (Über die Grundlagen des Violinspiels), which was reissued in 1990 along with some additional texts, most of the sheet music editions he published were of the Brahms quartets. Some of his own chamber music works, including his piano quintet in E-flat major, were published during the composer's lifetime, some even re-released. Since 1979 the Karl Klingler Foundation, set up by Marianne-Migault Klingler (1922–1991) to honour her father, has provided bursaries to support string quartet music.

== Karl Klingler Foundation ==
The Karl Klingler foundation was established in 1979 to support string quartets and to promote early training for string players, applying the Suzuki method developed by Klingler's former pupil, Shinichi Suzuki. Karl Klingler's daughter Marianne established the foundation and served as its first president.

The foundation provides a vehicle for presenting Suzuki's underlying precept that all children can learn to play the violin if they (1) make an early start, (2) receive tuition based on a better method and received from (3) a better teacher. Furthermore, service to humanity is the highest vocation and the highest objective of artistic endeavour, and the improvement of human society must always lie at the heart of the foundation's goals.

The first three Karl Klingler String Quartet competitions took place in Hanover in 1979, 1981 and 1983. Winning participants included the Cherubini Quartet, the Stuttgart Quartet and the Mannheim Quartet from Germany, the Guadagnini Quartet and the Fairfield Quartet from Great Britain, and from Romania the Voces Quartet. Bursaries were awarded to the German Auryn Quartet and to the Polish Voces Academia Quartet. There was a break of some years. The sixth competition took place in Berlin at what is now the Hanns Eisler Music Academy: prize winners were the German Kuss Quartet and, from France the Quatuor Johannes and Quatuor Diotima.
