= Gaspar Cassadó =

Spanish cellist and composer

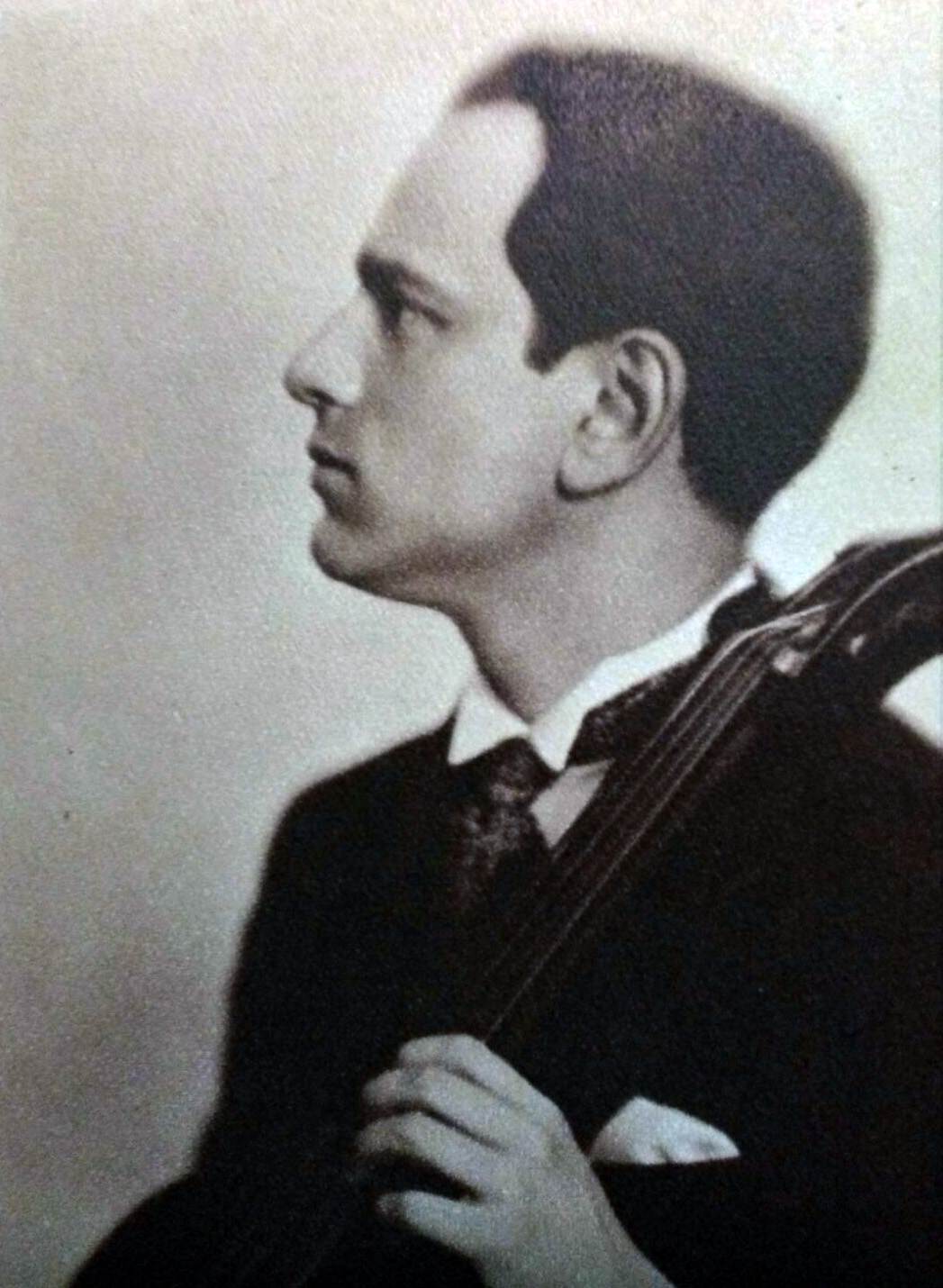
Gaspar Cassadó i Moreu

Gaspar Cassadó i Moreu (30 September or 5 October 1897 – 24 December 1966) was a Spanish cellist and composer of the early 20th century.

== Biography ==
Gaspar Cassadó during the first of three acclaimed tours of Southern Africa

Gaspar Cassadó i Moreu was born in Barcelona to a church musician father, Joaquim Cassadó, and began taking cello lessons at age seven. When he was nine, he played in a recital where Pablo Casals was in the audience; Casals immediately offered to teach him. The city of Barcelona awarded him a scholarship so that he could study with Casals in Paris.

In 1914 World War I broke out and his brother Agustí died a victim of an epidemic. Gaspar returned to Barcelona and began to offer concerts with the main orchestras of Spain. From 1918 he also performed in France and Italy, thanks to his friendship with Alfredo Casella. In 1920 he toured Argentina. From 1922 he began to make known his own compositions, both pieces for cello and concerts, chamber music, oratorios and a sardana. He also made transcriptions for cello.

In 1923 and thanks to the friendship with Francesco von Mendelssohn he met the singer and pianist Giulietta Gordigiani, with whom he lived for more than three decades, settling in Florence. Gaspar and Giulietta created a cello and piano duo with which they toured the European stages for more than a decade, achieving great success. Giulietta Gordigiani, widow of Robert von Mendelssohn, offered him fundamental support for the development and promotion of his career, as well as an excellent piano collaboration. Great virtuosos, they reaped for years the praise of the public and the admiration of the critics. In 1940 he toured the United States and spent the years of World War II in the village of Striano with Giulietta.

External audio
- Gaspar Cassadó performing Johannes Brahms's Piano Trio No. 2 in C major, Op. 87 with pianist Myra Hess and violinist Jelly D'Arani in 1935

His career suffered a very significant and irreparable decline in the postwar period, due mainly to a famous letter Casals published in The New York Times accusing him of collaboration with the fascist regimes and asking that Cassadó not be allowed to play in the allied countries.

Dear Friend,

During the war Cassado made himself a brilliant career in Germany, Italy and Franco Spain. Without scruple he presents himself in America and is received. This is deplorable. The presumption of Cassado knows no limit, when knowing that I am undergoing exile for having played the opposite card, he uses my name to cover himself. A revolting cynicism!

I hope at least that the musicians of America will know how to act in this case, which in my opinion is more serious than either that of Furtwaengler or Gieseking.

It is not a question of hatred, but one of dignity and justice.

I embrace you.

Your

Pablo Casals

Cassadó disputed Casals' allegations, and scholars have questioned Casals' motivation. Cassadó and Casals eventually reconciled with the help of Yehudi Menuhin.

Cassadó combined his solo career with his participation as a jury in international competitions. From 1946 he was professor at the Accademia Musicale Chigiana in Siena, and from 1958 at the Staatliche Hochschule für Musik in Cologne. That same year he co-founded the "Course of Spanish Music in Compostela" in Santiago de Compostela.

He was also the author of several notable musical hoaxes, notably the "Toccata" that he attributed to Girolamo Frescobaldi.

The personal papers of Cassadó's father are preserved in the Biblioteca de Catalunya. Gaspar's own papers, along with those of his wife, the pianist Chieko Hara, are preserved at the Tamagawa University Museum of Education.

On the invitation of his friend Alicia de Larrocha, with whom he had a cello-piano duo (touring extensively with him from 1956–58), Cassadó played concerts and led frequent classes at Academia Marshall in Barcelona. The Professor of Cello chair at Academia Marshall is named after Cassadó and has been held since 2018 by Jacob Shaw.

== Compositions ==
=== Original works ===
Cassadó's many transcriptions are listed below his original works.

==== Concertos ====
- Cello Concerto in D minor (1926)

This piece, like the Suite for Cello Solo, is influenced by Spanish and Oriental folk music, and Impressionism. Cassadó studied composition with Maurice Ravel, and a Ravel-influenced "carnival music" appears in the second theme of the first movement. The second movement is a theme and variations which leads directly to a pentatonic Rondo.

==== Solo cello works ====
- Suite for Cello Solo

The Suite, like the Cello Concerto and the Piano Trio, came from one Cassadó's most prolific periods, in the mid-1920s. It consists of three dance movements: Preludio-Fantasia (a Zarabanda); Sardana; and Intermezzo e Danza Finale (a Jota). The first movement includes quotations from Zoltán Kodály's Sonata for Cello Solo, Op. 8, and the famous flute solo from Maurice Ravel's ballet Daphnis et Chloé. The sardana of the second movement is a traditional dance from Catalonia.

- Fugue in the Style of Handel

==== Solo guitar works ====
- Canción de Leonardo
- Catalanesca
- Dos Cantos Populares Finlandeses (Two Finnish Folk Songs)
- Leyenda Catalana
- Préambulo y Sardana
- Sardana Chigiana

==== Works for cello and piano ====
- Allegretto Grazioso "After Schubert"
- Archares 1954
- Danse du diable vert (Dance of the Green Devil) for violin or cello 1926
- La Pendule, la Fileuse et le Galant 1925
- Lamento de Boabdil 1931
- Minuetto "After Paderewski"
- Morgenlied 1957
- Partita 1935
- Pastorale "After Couperin"
- Rapsodia del Sur
- Requiebros 1934

here performed by John Michel (4:43)

- Serenade 1925
- Sonata in A minor 1925
- Sonata nello stile antico spagnuolo (Sonata in an "Old Spanish Style") 1925
- Toccata "After Frescobaldi" 1925

==== Chamber works ====
- Piano Trio in C major 1926/1929
- String Quartet No. 1 in F minor 1929
- String Quartet No. 2 in G major 1930
- String Quartet No. 3 in C minor 1933

=== Transcriptions ===
==== Concerto transcriptions ====
- Cello Concerto in F major, based on Carl Philipp Emanuel Bach's Concerto No. 3 in A major, Wq. 172
- Cello Concerto in D major, based on Mozart's Horn Concerto No. 3 in E flat major, K. 447
- Cello Concerto in A minor, based on Schubert's Arpeggione Sonata, D. 821
- Cello Concerto in E major, based on Tchaikovsky's Piano Pieces, Op. 72 (1940)

Cassadó transformed nine of Tchaikovsky's pieces into a concerto. He used No. 18 Scene dansante (Invitation au trepak), No. 3 Tendres Reproches and No. 14 Chant Elegiaque in the first movement; No. 5 Meditation and No. 8 Dialogue in the second and No. 4 Danse Caracteristique, No. 2 Berceuse, No. 17 Passe Lointain and No. 1 Impromptu in the third. This concerto was a favorite of Cassadó's. It was published in 1940 by Edition Schott No. 3743.

- Cello Concerto in D major, based on Weber's Clarinet Concerto No. 2 in E♭ major, Op. 74
- Cello Concerto in E minor, based on Vivaldi's Cello Sonata No. 5, RV. 40
- Guitar Concerto in E major, based on Boccherini's Concerto No. 2 in D major, G. 479

Cassadó completely rewrote the Concerto for his colleague Andrés Segovia. The transcription features a solo string quartet, and trumpet fanfares make it reminiscent of Rodrigo.

==== Transcriptions for solo cello ====
- Johann Sebastian Bach – Cello Suite No. 4, BWV 1010

Cassadó transposed the suite to F major from its original key of E♭ major.

- Frédéric Chopin – Étude, Op. 25, No. 1
- George Frideric Handel – The Harmonious Blacksmith (from the Harpsichord Suites Vol.1 No.5 "Air and Variations")

==== Transcriptions for cello and piano ====
- Isaac Albéniz:
  - Cádiz (Serenata española)
  - Malagueña, Op. 165, No. 3
- Martin Berteau – Studio
- Luigi Boccherini – Minuetto
- Alexander Borodin – Serenata all spagnola (from String Quartet B-La-F)
- Jean-Baptiste Bréval – Sonata in G major (realization of figured bass)
- Frédéric Chopin – Minute Waltz, Op. 64, No. 1
- Constantino de Crescenzo – Prima Carezza
- Claude Debussy:
  - Clair de lune
  - Golliwog's Cakewalk
  - Minstrels
- Antonín Dvořák – Sonatina in G major, Op. 100 (Indian Lament)
- Gabriel Fauré – Nocturne No. 4
- Enrique Granados – Intermezzo (from the opera Goyescas)
- Ernesto Halffter – Canzone e Pastorella
- Blas de Laserna – Tonadilla
- Franz Liszt – Liebestraum (Notturno) No. 3
- Benedetto Marcello:
  - Sonata No. 1 in C major
  - Sonata No. 4 in A minor
- Federico Mompou – Chanson et Danse
- Federico Moreno Torroba – Fandanguillo
- Wolfgang Amadeus Mozart:
  - Rondo alla turca (from Piano Sonata K.331)
  - Serenata de Don Giovanni [Deh vieni alla finestra]
  - Sonata K. 358 (from Sonata for Piano Four Hands)
- Georg Muffat – Arioso
- Ignacy Jan Paderewski – Minuet in G
- Manuel Ponce – Estrellita (Little Star)
- David Popper – Elfentanz
- Johann Strauss II – An der schonen Blauen Donau
