= Louis Persinger =

American musician (1887–1966)

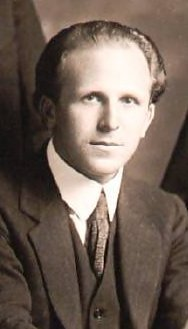
Louis Persinger's portrait (before 1928)

Louis Persinger (February 11, 1887, Rochester, Illinois – December 31, 1966, New York, New York) was an American violinist, pianist and professor of violin. Persinger had early lessons in Colorado, appearing in public by the age of 12. His main studies were at the Leipzig Conservatory where he studied violin with Hans Becker, piano with Carl Beving, conducting with Arthur Nikisch before finishing with Eugène Ysaÿe in Brussels and then studying with Jacques Thibaud in France for two summers. Arthur Nikisch described him as "one of the most talented pupils the Leipzig Conservatory ever had."

He served as leader of the Berlin Philharmonic orchestra and the Royal Opera Orchestra in Brussels before being appointed leader and assistant conductor of the San Francisco Symphony Orchestra in 1915 and succeeding Leopold Auer at the Juilliard School in New York in 1930.

He was best known as the teacher of great violinists Yehudi Menuhin, Ruggiero Ricci, Isaac Stern, Myriam Solovieff, Stephan Hero, Camilla Wicks, Almita Vamos, Fredell Lack, Guila Bustabo, Arnold Eidus, Donald Erickson, Zvi Zeitlin, Leonard Posner, Enrique Danowicz, Francis Chaplin and Louise Behrend.

He was also Ricci's piano accompanist for many recitals and recordings, and Menuhin's for his first few recordings.
