= Ruth Landshoff =

German actress, writer

- Ruth Landshoff in Nosferatu (1922)
- Born: Ruth Levy; 7 January 1904; Berlin, German Empire
- Died: 19 January 1966 (aged 62); New York City, U.S.
- Occupations: Actress, writer

Ruth Landshoff-Yorck (born Ruth Levy, 7 January 1904 – 19 January 1966) was a German-American actress and writer.

== Life and career ==
She was born in 1904 in Berlin as Ruth Levy to engineer Edward Levy and opera singer Else Landshoff. She came from a middle class Jewish family and grew up in Berlin. Her uncle was the publisher Samuel Fischer.

During the Weimar Republic Berlin became the intellectual and artistic centre of Europe. Landshoff counted among her friends Ernst Toller, Bertolt Brecht, Thomas Mann and Albert Einstein. One of her close friends in Berlin was Swiss writer Annemarie Schwarzenbach. She enjoyed a privileged lifestyle in Berlin and frequented the many gay bars. She would dress as a man and appeared in public as her alter ego René.

Landshoff appeared in several avant-garde films before she trained as an actress. Landshoff appeared as Ruth in Friedrich Wilhelm Murnau's landmark silent film Nosferatu in 1922. In the same year she made a brief appearance in Die Gezeichneten by Carl Theodor Dreyer. After attending Reinhardt's acting school, Landshoff turned to stage acting. She made appearances in Berlin, Leipzig, and Vienna before giving up acting.

From 1924 to 1930 she was in a relationship with playwright and screenwriter Karl Vollmöller (The Miracle, The Blue Angel). She married David Graf Yorck von Wartenburg in 1930, however they divorced in 1937.

In 1933 she emigrated from Nazi-Germany to France, then to the United Kingdom, then to Switzerland and finally in March 1937 to the US, where she worked until her death as a writer and translator in New York City. She wrote novels, poems, and magazine columns. Though she was a native German speaker, she quickly learned to write in English. Landshoff died in New York during a theatre performance of Marat/Sade by Peter Weiss on January 19, 1966. Her bequest, the Ruth Yorck Archive, is located in the Department of Special Collections/Mugar Memorial Library of Boston University.

Ruth Landshoff-Yorck was the subject of a biography, with fourteen photographs, Die vielen Leben der Ruth Landshoff-Yorck (The many lives of the Ruth Landshoff-York).

== Published works ==
- The fortified girl. Poems and drawings for my friends. (1929, privately printed poems with 6 and 6 drawings by the author)
- The Many and the One (Berlin 1930 reprint ed. and with an afterword by Walter Fähnders 2001 Berlin Aviva)
- Poems (1934, private printing with 8 poems)
- Poems (probably 1934 privately printed with 11 poems and drawings 5)
- The Poems (1935, private edition with 10 poems)
- The Man Who Killed Hitler (Hollywood 1939 London 1939, anonymous, along with Dean S. Jennings and David Malcolmson)
- Sixty to Go (New York 1944)
- Lili Marlene. An Intimate Diary (New York 1945)
- So Cold the Night (New York 1948)
- the immense tenderness (Frankfurt 1952)
- January deadlock (New York 1962 privately printed)
- I'll Measure Them For a White White Coat ... (New York 1963 privately printed)
- Gossip, fame and small fires. Biographical Impressions (Cologne 1963 revised and expanded edition ed. By Claudia Schopp man. Frankfurt am Main, 1997)
- The Poet as a Dictator (New York 1965 privately printed)
- The Men in Her Life . Hg and with an afterword by Walter Fähnders (first edition from the estate, Berlin 2002 Aviva, revised edition: Berlin 2005, Aviva).
- Treasure Seekers of Venice. Hg. and with an afterword by Walter Fähnders (first edition from the estate, Berlin 2004 Aviva, reprint: Berlin 2013 Aviva)
- In the depths of hell . Hg., And with an afterword by Walter Fähnders (first edition from the estate, Berlin 2010 Aviva)
- Das Mädchen mit wenig PS. Feuilletons aus den zwanziger Jahren. Hrsg. und mit einem Nachwort von Walter Fähnders. AvivA Verlag, Berlin 2015. 224 S.; ISBN 978-3-932338-81-6
