= Cello Concerto in D minor (Cassadó) =

Cello concert composed by Gaspar Cassadó

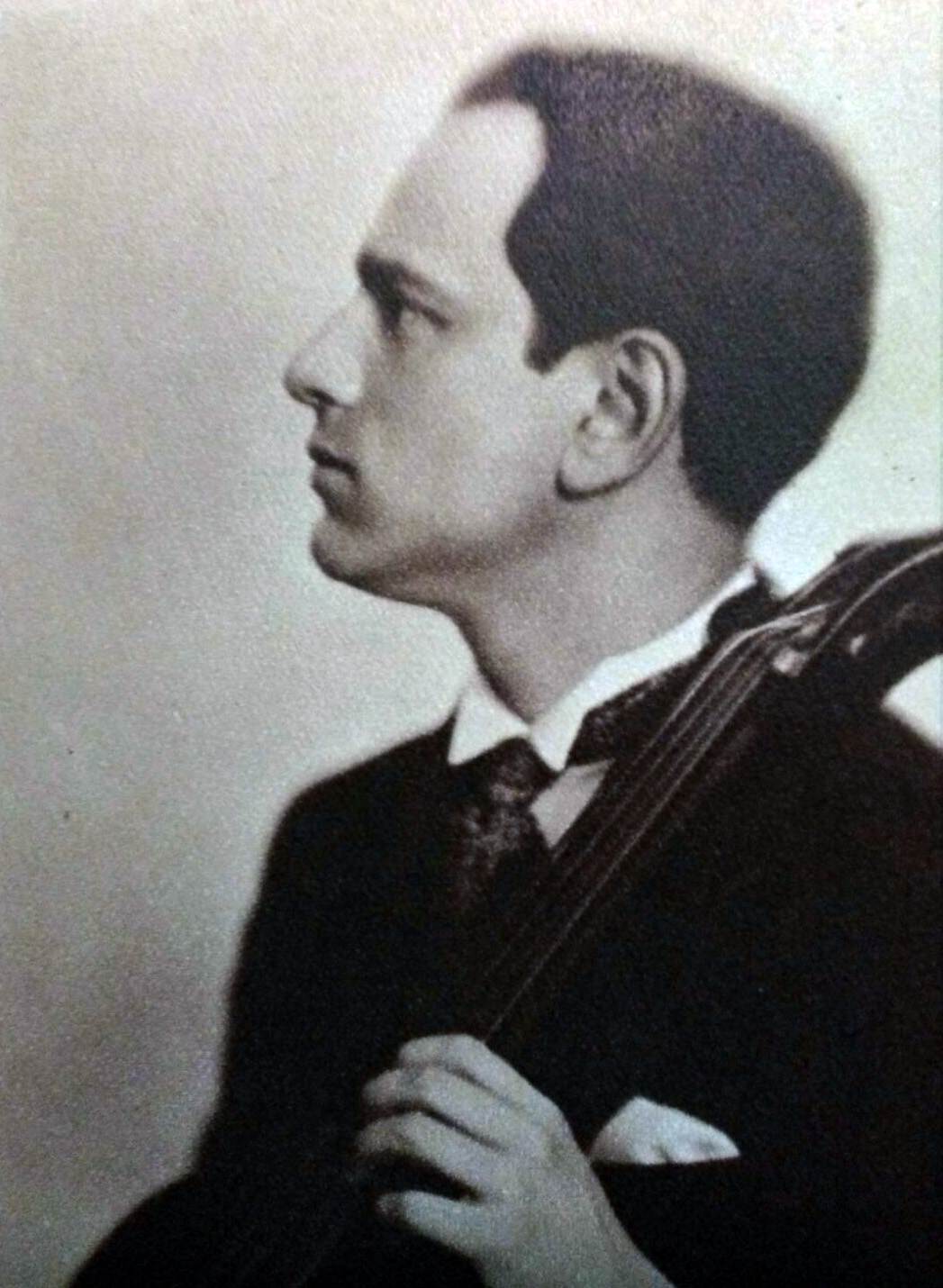
Gaspar Cassadó

Gaspar Cassadó's Cello Concerto in D minor was first performed in 1926 by Cassadó and Pablo Casals, to whom the work was dedicated.

The concerto consists of two movements:

1. Allegro non troppo
2. Andante con variazioni e Allegro finale: Andante con sentimento austero – Allegro ritmico e piuttosto moderato.

This piece, like the Suite for Cello Solo, has folk music elements: Spanish, Oriental, and Impressionistic. Gaspar Cassadó studied composition with Maurice Ravel and Ravelian "carnival music" can be heard in the second theme of the first movement. The second movement is a theme and variations. An attacca leads to a pentatonic Rondo. The concerto combines contrasting thematic material across its two movements, including variations in the second movement and pentatonic Rondo in its concluding section.

== Recordings ==
- 2002 – Martin Ostertag, cello; Baden-Badener Philharmonie conducted by Werner Stiefel.
