= Cello Concerto (Thomson) =

Concerto by Virgil Thomson

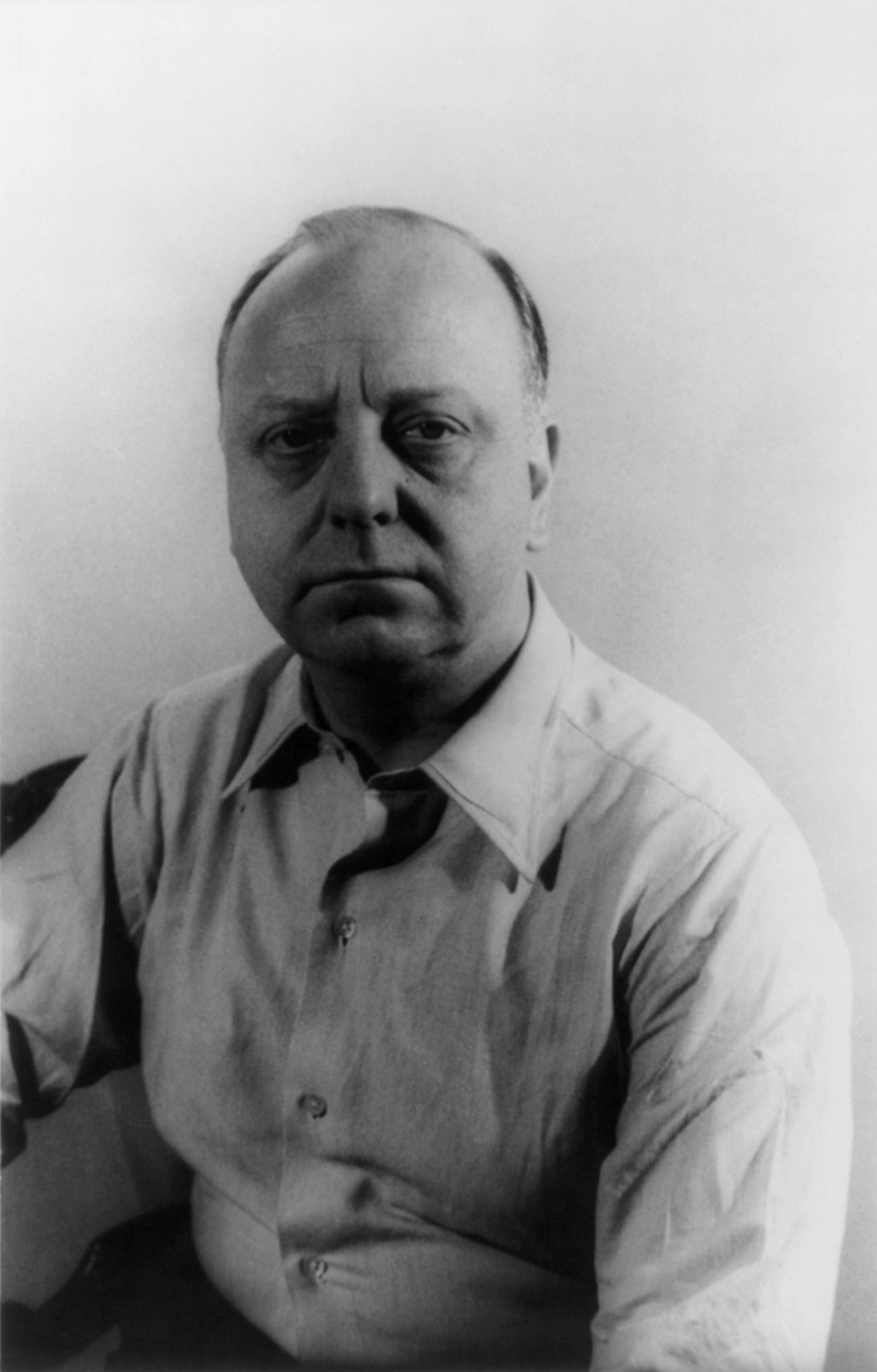
Virgil Thomson in 1947

The Concerto for Violoncello and Orchestra is a composition for cello and orchestra by the American composer Virgil Thomson. The piece was given its world premiere by the cellist Paul Olefsky and the Philadelphia Orchestra under the direction of Eugene Ormandy at the Academy of Music, Philadelphia, on March 24, 1950.

== Composition ==
The Cello Concerto has a performance duration of approximately 20 minutes and is cast in three movements:

1. Rider on the Plains
2. Variations on a Southern Hymn
3. Children's Games

=== Instrumentation ===
The work is scored for cello solo and an orchestra comprising two flutes, two oboes, two clarinets, two bassoons, four horns, two trumpets, three percussionists, harp, celesta, and strings.

== Reception ==
Reviewing the New York City premiere at Carnegie Hall, Olin Downes of The New York Times wrote, "Mr. Thomson writes gaily, tunefully, and in an unpretentious manner. He has taken care to write as idiomatically as possible for the solo instrument. He avoids lengthy developments or over-extensions of his ideas. Sometimes the connective tissue between the main ideas is thin, sometimes the developments sag a trifle. But the evolutionary symphonic style is not here the composer's intention. He is entertaining us." The concerto is frequently cited by the music critic Tim Page as one of his favorite Thomson works.
