= Günter Raphael =

German composer

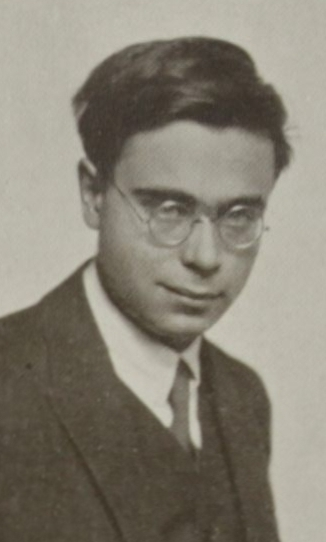
Günter Raphael (1903–1960), German composer and pedagogue

Günter Raphael (30 April 1903 – 19 October 1960) was a German composer. Born in Berlin, Raphael was the grandson of composer Albert Becker. His first symphony was premiered by Wilhelm Furtwängler in 1926 in Leipzig with the Gewandhaus Orchestra. From 1926 to 1934 he taught in Leipzig, but illness and the rise of Fascism – he was declared a "half-Jew" – made this difficult for him. He received the Franz Liszt Award for composition in 1948. His students include Kurt Hessenberg and Atli Heimir Sveinsson.

His compositions include five symphonies, concertos for violin and for organ, six string quartets, numerous solos and duos for strings and winds with and without piano of which several have been recorded. Raphael also composed organ, piano and choral works. He was also responsible for arranging a performance version of Antonín Dvořák's Cello Concerto in A major (1865) when its piano and cello score was discovered in 1918.

He was also an editor of classical and baroque scores for Breitkopf and Härtel, preparing editions of, for example, flute sonatas by Frederick the Great and works by Vivaldi and Johann Sebastian Bach (some of these can be found in the Cornell University Library).
