= Concerto (TV program) =

1976 Canadian music television program

- Genre: Classical music
- Presented by: Victor Feldbrill
- Country of origin: Canada
- Original language: English
- No. of seasons: 1
- No. of episodes: 7

Original release
- Network: CBC Television
- Release: 18 February – 4 August 1976

Concerto is a Canadian music television program that aired on CBC Television in 1976.

== Premise ==
Toronto Symphony Orchestra conductor Victor Feldbrill presented this classical music program featuring ensembles such as the Chamber Players of Toronto and violinist Jean Carignan.

== Scheduling ==
This half-hour program of seven episodes was broadcast on selected Wednesdays at 9:30 p.m. (Eastern) from 18 February to 4 August 1976.
