= Lillian D. Rock =

American lawyer

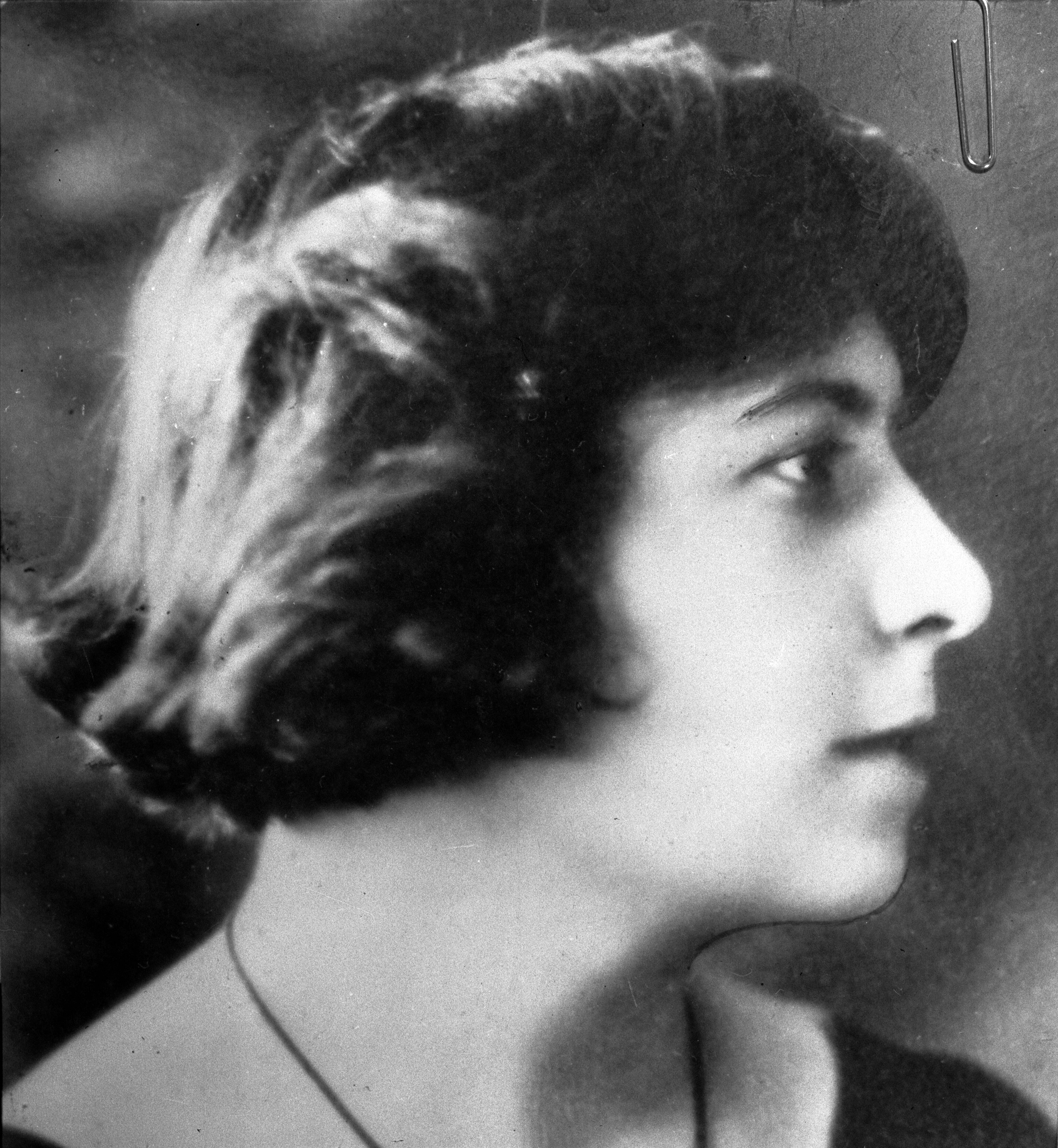
Rock in 1935

Lillian D. Rock (August 6, 1896 – 1974) was an American lawyer and political activist. Rock is best remembered as the founder in 1935 of the League for a Woman President and Vice President.

== Biography ==
=== Early years ===
Lillian D. Rock was born August 6, 1896, in New York City to Joel Rock and the former Ida Libby Gross.

Following high school she obtained an undergraduate degree before enrolling in Brooklyn Law School, from which she graduated in 1923. She passed the New York state bar exam in 1925 and entered practice with her brother Nathaniel as part of the New York City law firm Rock and Rock. The pair remained in practice for over a decade, handling more than 5,000 cases by their own count.

=== Political activism ===
Rock was active in the National Association of Women Lawyers.

In 1935 Rock founded a political organization called League for a Woman President and Vice President, with its mission the persuasion of one of the major American political parties to nominate a woman for one or both of these top executive governmental positions by 1940.

== Works ==
- "The Need for and the Purpose of the National Association of Women Lawyers," Women Lawyers' Journal, vol. 18 (1930), pp. 15–17.
