= Cello Concerto No. 9 (Boccherini) =

Cello Concerto by Luigi Boccherini

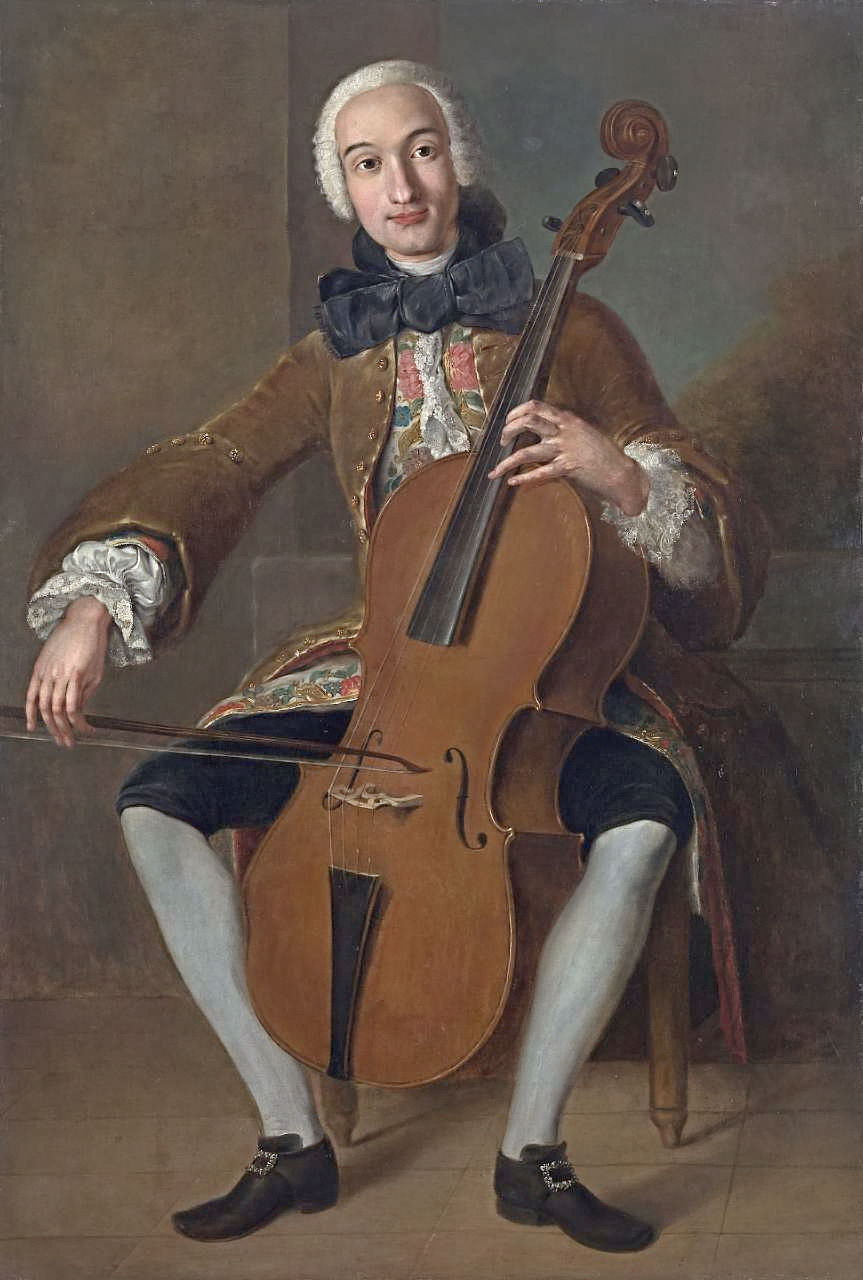
Luigi Boccherini playing the cello, by Pompeo Batoni

Luigi Boccherini's Cello Concerto No. 9 in B♭ Major, G. 482, was written in either the late 1760s or early 1770s. Boccherini, a talented cellist, composed 12 cello concertos. In 1895, German cellist Friedrich Grützmacher chose this concerto to be arranged to fit the style of a Romantic virtuoso concerto, and in this form, widely heard, it bears only a tenuous resemblance to the original manuscript.

The Boccherini Ninth Cello Concerto has long been an integral part of standard cello instruction, because of creeping use of the full 4+ octave range of the cello, rather than large jumps between different finger positions.

Grützmacher merged Boccherini's Ninth Cello Concerto with other Boccherini Cello Concertos. Besides the extensive cuts in the outer movements, Grützmacher decided to rid the Concerto of its original second movement, replacing it with that of the Seventh Cello Concerto (in G Major, G.480). The Fourth Cello Concerto (In C Major, G.477) makes an appearance in bars 40-46 of the first movement, and in bars 85-96 and 151-163 of the Rondo, borrowing from the respective movements. The arpeggios of the Fifth Cello Concerto's (in D Major, G478) first movement are featured in their minor form in bars 47-53 of the first movement. Grützmacher also took the liberty of writing his own cadenzas. Despite all the changes, this Concerto holds up as one of Boccherini's best-known works.

Pablo Casals, Pierre Fournier, Janos Starker, and Jacqueline du Pré all made recordings of the Grützmacher version of the Concerto. Maurice Gendron and Yo-Yo Ma have made recordings of the original work. The two works are distinguished by their origin: Original vs. arr. Grützmacher.

== Movements ==
The concerto has four movements:

1. Allegro moderato
2. Andante grazioso (Original)
3. Adagio (non troppo) (Grützmacher)
4. Rondo. (Allegro)
