= Haydn Cello Concerto =

Five cello concertos are attributed to Joseph Haydn:

- Cello Concerto No. 1 in C (Haydn)
- Cello Concerto No. 2 in D (Haydn)
- Cello Concerto No. 3 in A (Haydn) (lost)
- Cello Concerto No. 4 in D (Haydn) (spurious)
- Cello Concerto No. 5 in C (Haydn) (spurious)
