= Cello Concerto No. 2 (Boccherini) =

Cello Concerto No. 2 in A major, G. 475 is a cello concerto by Luigi Boccherini. It has been arranged and reorchestrated several times. Ottorino Respighi reorchestrated the Concerto, and changed the "Tutti" sections; adding winds and brass. Gaspar Cassadó rewrote the Concerto altogether as a Guitar Concerto for his colleague Andrés Segovia. Cassadó's arrangement features a string quartet, like a Concerto Grosso, and added trumpet fanfares.

== Arrangements ==
- Sergey Aslamazyan – Moskva : Muzyka
- Michel Brusselmans – Éditions Salabert
- Samuel Dushkin – Mainz, B. Schott's Söhne (Violin)
- Gaspar Cassadó – Mainz, B. Schott's Söhne (Guitar)
- Ottorino Respighi – Milan : Ricordi
