= Cello Concerto (Prokofiev) =

Work by Sergey Prokofiev

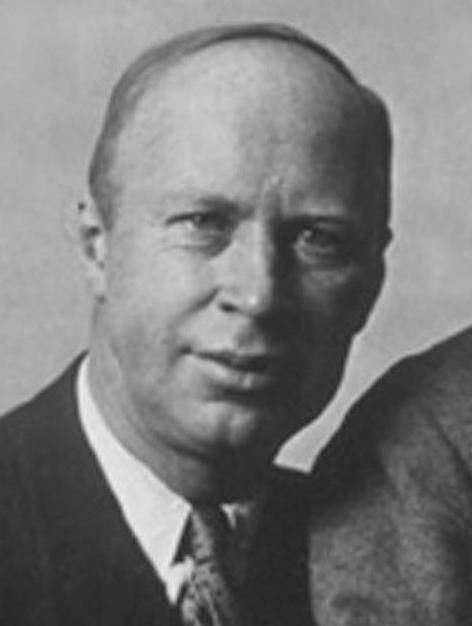
Sergei Prokofiev in 1936

The Cello Concerto in E minor, Op. 58 is a concerto written by Sergey Prokofiev between 1933 and 1938. Its duration is approximately 35 minutes. It consists of three movements:

1. Andante – Poco meno mosso (andante assai) – Adagio
2. Allegro giusto
3. Tema (allegro) – Interludio 1 – Variations 1–3 – Interludio 2 – Variation 4 – Reminiscenza (meno mosso) – Coda (poco sostenuto) – Più mosso

== History ==
The concerto was premiered on 26 November 1938 in Moscow by the USSR State Symphony Orchestra. Alexander Melik-Pashayev was the conductor and Lev Berezovsky played the cello.

The premiere of Prokofiev's Cello Concerto (Op. 58) was generally thought to have been very poorly interpreted by the cellist. The pianist Sviatoslav Richter, who rehearsed the piece with Berezovsky prior to its premiere, considered the soloist ill-suited to the piece ("the music was foreign to his nature") but felt that the conductor was also responsible for the performance's failure: "Melik-Pashayev's tempi were as impossible as they were wrong. It seemed to me that he utterly failed to grasp the work's inner essence. It was a total fiasco."

The concerto was seldom played afterwards, until Prokofiev heard Rostropovich play it at a 1947 concert at the Moscow Conservatory. The performance reawakened Prokofiev's interest in the cello, and he rewrote his concerto (with advice from Rostropovich) to create the Symphony-Concerto (Op. 125).

== Orchestration ==
The work is scored for solo cello, 2 flutes, 2 oboes, 2 clarinets, 2 bassoons, 2 French horns, 2 trumpets, tuba, timpani, percussion (cymbals, castanets, bass drum, snare drum, tambourine), and strings.
