= Cello Concerto in A major (Dvořák) =

Concerto by Antonín Dvořák

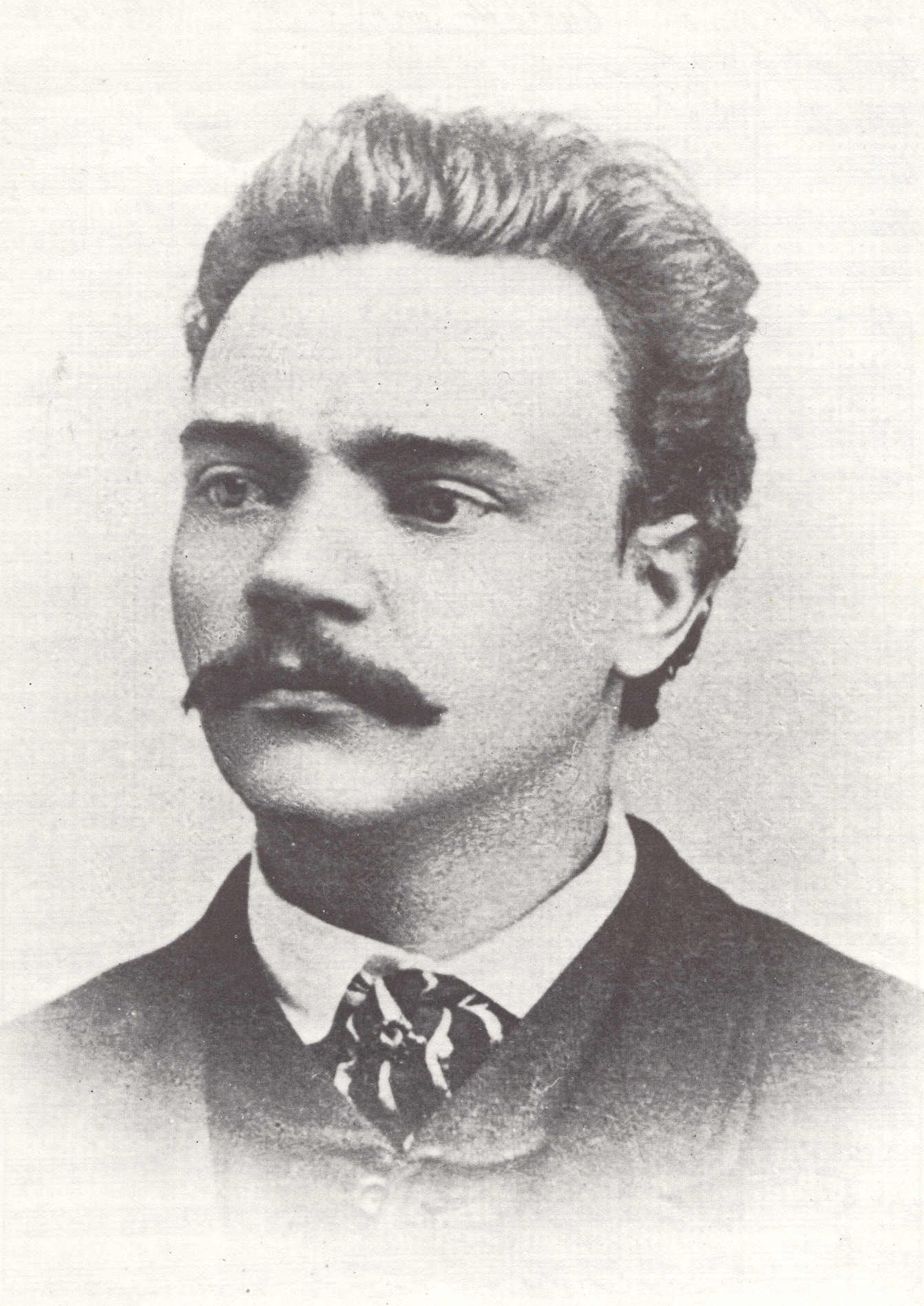
Antonín Dvořák in 1868

Antonín Dvořák wrote his first Cello Concerto in A major, B. 10 in 1865.

== Background ==
Unlike his famous B minor Cello Concerto, Op. 104, Dvořák's A major Concerto is traditionally overlooked, so much so that the later work is only rarely called "No. 2." There are two reasons for this fate for the three-movement earlier piece: Dvořák left it in piano-score form, un-orchestrated; and it sprawls to some 55 minutes, with outer movements about 25 and 21 minutes long, respectively.

Written for cellist Ludevít Peer (1847-1904), who apparently moved abroad to Germany with the music, it was rediscovered by composer Günter Raphael in 1925, years after Dvořák's death. This autograph version was offered for sale to the Czech state but was declined due to the high cost; it was later purchased by the British Museum and since 1973 has been in the British Library's collection.

Jan Burian gave its first performance (after revising the cello part) on 26 April 1929.

Raphael orchestrated and heavily edited it in the late 1920s, making it more his own than Dvořák's. The 1970s brought a second editor, the Dvořák expert and curator Jarmil Burghauser, who, along with cellist Miloš Sádlo, prepared a more lightly rethought account published two ways: in an orchestration by Burghauser; and in the original piano-score form with cuts corresponding to the new orchestrated version. Burghauser took the liberty of shortening both outer movements. One can sample all three editions, since there are Supraphon recordings available (original and Burghauser) as well as Steven Isserlis's frequent touring with the Raphael version, released on Hyperion Records.

== Recordings ==
- CPO
  - Ramón Jaffé, Cello. Rhine Philharmonic State Orchestra. Jarmil Burghauser version.
- Supraphon Label
  - Jiří Bárta, Cello. Original form, for Cello and Piano.
  - Miloš Sádlo, Cello. An orchestrated version by Jarmil Burghauser.
- Koch Classics
  - Werner Thomas-Mifune, Cello. Burghauser version.
- Hyperion
  - Steven Isserlis, Cello. Mahler Chamber Orchestra conducted by Daniel Harding. Raphael version.

In 2010, the Czech cellist Tomáš Jamník recorded a new edition of the A major concerto with the Prague Radio Symphony Orchestra on the Supraphon label. The performers here shorten the concerto to 35 minutes, sometimes following Burghauser, but sometimes, following extensive research by themselves, finding their own solutions to some of the problems caused by only having the piano score, rather than a full orchestral version. After completion of the piano score, Dvořák never went back to his "Concerto for 'Cello with piano accompaniment".
