= Shinichi Suzuki =

Japanese violinist and educator (1898–1998)

Shinichi Suzuki 鈴木鎮一

Background information
- Also known as: Shin'ichi Suzuki
- Born: Shinichi Suzuki; 17 October 1898; Nagoya, Japan
- Origin: Japan
- Died: 26 January 1998 (aged 99) Matsumoto, Japan
- Genre: Classical
- Occupations: Musician, violinist, pedagogue, philosopher
- Instrument: Violin
- Years active: 1929–1994
- Spouse: Waltraud Prange (m. 1928; died 1998)

Shinichi Suzuki (鈴木 鎮一, Suzuki Shin'ichi; 17 October 1898 – 26 January 1998) was a Japanese violinist, philosopher, composer, and educator who founded the international Suzuki method of music education and developed a broader educational philosophy known as "Talent Education" (才能教育, Sainō Kyōiku). An influential pedagogue in early childhood education, he maintained that musical and intellectual abilities are not inborn talents, but capacities that can be nurtured in any child through a stimulating environment and repetition, mirroring the acquisition of a mother tongue.

Before his work, young children were rarely taught classical instruments formally or accepted by music schools without an audition. Suzuki taught violin from early childhood and admitted all applicants to his school in Matsumoto without entrance examinations. He trained several of the first Japanese string players appointed to major Western orchestras. During his lifetime, he received multiple honorary doctorates, was decorated by the governments of Japan, West Germany, and France, and was nominated for the Nobel Peace Prize in 1993.

== Biography ==
=== Early life and education (1898–1928) ===
Shinichi Suzuki was born on 17 October 1898 in Nagoya, Japan, the third son among twelve children of Masakichi Suzuki (1859–1944) and Ryo Fujie. His father, originally a maker of traditional shamisen, built his first violin in 1888 and established the Suzuki Violin Factory in Nagoya in 1900, which grew into the largest violin manufacturer in the world. Raised around the factory, Suzuki graduated from Nagoya Commercial School in 1916—where the school's motto, "Character first, ability second," became his lifelong guiding principle—and joined the factory's export department.

Around age 17, Suzuki began to teach himself the violin by imitating a gramophone recording of Franz Schubert's Ave Maria performed by Mischa Elman. In August 1919, he joined a biological expedition to the northern Kuril Islands (Chishima) led by Marquis Yoshichika Tokugawa, alongside pianist Nobu Kōda, who recognized his musical promise and persuaded his father to allow him to study music. At age 21, Suzuki moved to Tokyo, residing at Marquis Tokugawa's mansion while studying violin privately with Kō Andō (Nobu Kōda's sister and a former pupil of Joseph Joachim), music theory with Ryūtarō Hirota, and acoustics with Hisao Tanabe.

In October 1920, at age 22, Suzuki traveled to Berlin, where he spent eight years studying under Karl Klingler, leader of the Klingler Quartet and a former student of Joachim. Although some later commentators questioned his formal conservatory enrollment, both Suzuki's memoirs and Klingler's daughter, Marianne Klingler, confirmed that Suzuki studied privately with Klingler—who rarely accepted private pupils—focusing on concertos and sonatas during the first four years and chamber music during the following four. He also commuted to Leipzig to study orchestration with Georg Schumann. Through physician Leonor Michaelis, Suzuki became acquainted with physicist and amateur violinist Albert Einstein, who served as his informal guardian in Berlin and introduced him to musical and scientific circles.

While in Berlin, Suzuki met German pianist and soprano Waltraud Prange (1905–2000). After converting to Roman Catholicism, he married her in a Catholic ceremony in Berlin on 8 February 1928 before returning to Japan via the Trans-Siberian Railway.

=== Career in Japan and World War II (1929–1945) ===
In 1929, Suzuki formed the Suzuki String Quartet with three of his younger brothers (Kikuo, Akira, and Fumiyo), concertizing across Japan and broadcasting on national radio. Around 1931–1932, while teaching at the Imperial School of Music and the Kunitachi Music School in Tokyo, he was asked to teach violin to four-year-old Toshiya Etō, followed shortly by three-year-old Koji Toyoda. Realizing that all Japanese children effortlessly master their complex native language through immersion and repetition, he began formulating his "Mother Tongue Method" of violin instruction, teaching young children at pianist Yoshimune Hirata's studio in Tokyo and presenting his first massed children's recitals at Hibiya Public Hall in 1942.

During World War II, the family's Nagoya violin factory was converted to manufacture wooden seaplane floats and was later damaged by Allied bombing. Due to wartime restrictions on foreign nationals in Japan, Waltraud was evacuated to a German enclave in Hakone, while Suzuki relocated to the mountain town of Kiso-Fukushima to manage a converted geta workshop supplying cypress timber for the factory. At the war's end in 1945, after learning that Koji Toyoda's parents had died, Suzuki located the eleven-year-old boy via a missing-persons broadcast on NHK and took him into his household.

=== Talent Education Institute and international expansion (1945–1998) ===
In late 1945, Suzuki accepted an invitation to teach in Matsumoto on the condition that he be permitted to establish an early-childhood music program, formally launching the Talent Education movement. His younger brother Shiro established a workshop in Matsumoto to craft fractional-sized violins for young beginners. By 1955, Suzuki launched the Annual National Concert in Tokyo, where thousands of children from across Japan performed together without prior joint rehearsal. In April 1961, cellist Pablo Casals attended a performance of 400 Suzuki students at Tokyo's Bunkyo Hall and publicly praised the humanistic goals of the movement.

Following screenings of films of Suzuki's concerts at Oberlin College by Kenji Mochizuki and visits to Matsumoto by American string pedagogues John Kendall (1959) and Clifford Cook, Suzuki led a tour of ten Japanese children across 16 U.S. cities in March 1964, culminating in a landmark performance for the Music Educators National Conference (MENC) in Philadelphia. In 1967, the new Talent Education Research Institute headquarters (*Kaikan*) was dedicated in Matsumoto with financial backing from Sony co-founder Masaru Ibuka.

Suzuki collaborated with his sister-in-law Shizuko Suzuki on the Suzuki Piano School, and encouraged the adaptation of his pedagogy to cello (Yoshio Sato), flute (Toshio Takahashi), and viola (Doris Preucil). In 1983, he co-founded the International Suzuki Association (ISA) as its first president to oversee global teacher training and protect the pedagogical standards of the method. He was also a National Patron of Delta Omicron, an international professional music fraternity.

Suzuki retired from daily teaching in autumn 1994 at age 96 and died at his home in Matsumoto on 26 January 1998, aged 99. Following a Catholic funeral service, he was buried at Nakayama Cemetery in Nagano Prefecture.

== Contributions to pedagogy and philosophy ==
Shinichi Suzuki listening to a young violin student.

Suzuki's educational framework, which he termed the "Law of Ability" and the "Mother Tongue Method," rests on the premise that musical ability is not an inherited trait but a physiological and cognitive capacity developed through environmental stimulation. Influenced by the ethical writings of Leo Tolstoy, the Zen teachings of Dōgen, and his association with Albert Einstein in Berlin, Suzuki summarized his educational aim as nurturing moral character and human sensitivity rather than solely producing professional virtuosos ("character first, ability second").

Key elements of his pedagogical methodology include:

- Early immersion and daily listening: Children listen daily to high-quality recordings of the repertoire from infancy, absorbing pitch, rhythm, and musical phrasing aurally before attempting to play.
- Delayed music reading: Musical notation is introduced only after a child has established basic posture, aural sensitivity, and instrumental control—analogous to learning to speak before learning to read—while parents initially learn to read scores to guide home practice.
- Tonalization: Coined at Suzuki's request in English by analogy with vocal vocalization, tonalization refers to daily exercises dedicated to producing a resonant, singing instrumental tone.
- Step-by-step mastery and repertoire review: Rather than assigning mechanical technical études (such as those by Beyer or Czerny), Suzuki sequenced core works from the classical repertoire (beginning with variations on "Twinkle, Twinkle, Little Star" and progressing through Baroque and Classical masters) so that each technical challenge is mastered within musical pieces and continuously reviewed.
- Parental involvement and group learning: Parents attend lessons, take notes or recordings, and act as home teachers, while group classes and non-competitive graduation levels foster peer motivation.

At the 1958 National Festival, Suzuki stated:

Though still in an experimental stage, Talent Education has realized that all children in the world show their splendid capacities by speaking and understanding their mother language, thus displaying the original power of the human mind. Is it not probable that this mother language method holds the key to human development? Talent Education has applied this method to the teaching of music: children, taken without previous aptitude or intelligence test of any kind, have almost without exception made great progress.

— Shinichi Suzuki, 1958 National Festival

Beyond music, Suzuki applied his principles to general early childhood education. In 1949, he established the experimental preschool Yōji Gakuen in Matsumoto with educator Mrs. Yano, incorporating mixed-age classes, daily memorization of Issa haiku, calligraphy, and physical coordination. He also collaborated with Glenn Doman, founder of The Institutes for the Achievement of Human Potential, and partnered with Masaru Ibuka's Early Development Association (Yōji Kaihatsu Kyōkai), which expanded to over 100 affiliated kindergartens in Japan. In October 1968, Suzuki addressed the United Nations in New York to advocate for national early-childhood development policies worldwide.

== Awards, honors, and nominations ==
- Eugène Ysaÿe Medal, Belgium (1969)
- Order of the Sacred Treasure, Third Class, Japan (1970)
- Order of the Rising Sun, Third Class, Japan (1970s)
- Ordre des Palmes académiques, France (1982)
- Order of Merit of the Federal Republic of Germany, Officer's Cross (Bundesverdienstkreuz 1. Klasse), West Germany (1985)
- Honorary Citizen of Matsumoto (1979)
- Honorary Doctor of Music, New England Conservatory of Music (1966)
- Honorary Doctor of Music, University of Louisville (1967)
- Honorary Doctor of Music, University of Rochester Eastman School of Music (1972)
- Honorary Doctor of Music, Oberlin College Conservatory of Music (1984)
- Honorary Doctor of Music, Cleveland Institute of Music (1990)
- Honorary Distinguished Professor, North East Louisiana University (1982)
- Nobel Peace Prize Nominee (1993)

== Selected bibliography ==
Suzuki authored numerous pedagogical manuals, essays, and graded repertoire volumes (Suzuki Violin School, Suzuki Piano School). Major works translated into English include:

- Suzuki, Shinichi (1983) [1969]. Nurtured by Love: The Classic Approach to Talent Education. Translated by Waltraud Suzuki (2nd ed.). Summy-Birchard Inc. ISBN 0-87487-584-6.
- Suzuki, Shinichi (1981). Ability Development from Age Zero. Translated by Mary Louise Nagata. Summy-Birchard Inc.
- Suzuki, Shinichi (1982). Where Love Is Deep: The Writings of Shinichi Suzuki. Translated by Kyoko Selden. Talent Education Journal.
- Suzuki, Shinichi (1993). How to Teach Suzuki Piano. Summy-Birchard Inc. ISBN 0-87487-583-8.
- Suzuki, Shinichi (1996) [1946]. Young Children's Talent Education & Its Method. Translated by Kyoko Selden. Summy-Birchard Inc. ISBN 0-87487-770-9.
- Suzuki, Shinichi (1998). Shinichi Suzuki: His Speeches and Essays. Summy-Birchard Inc. ISBN 0-87487-588-9.
