= Tailpin =

Tailpin can refer to:

- Endpin (also known as spike) of a cello or bass
- The pin or button to which a tailpiece of a string instrument is attached
