= Josephine van Lier =

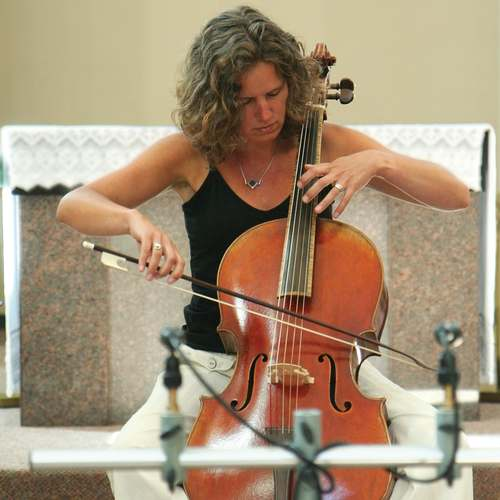
- Josephine van Lier; During the recording of the Bach Suites.

Background information
- Genre: Classical
- Occupation: Cellist
- Years active: 1992–present
- Label: Independent
- Website: Official Website

Josephine van Lier (born 1968, in the Netherlands) is a performing cellist specialized in both baroque and contemporary cello residing in Canada.

== Biography ==
Josephine van Lier is equally at ease on a baroque cello or a 5 string violoncello piccolo as on their contemporary counterparts, using instruments and bows whose designs, construction and material span over 400 years in origin, from the gut strings of her baroque cello to her 1870 cello and the space-age material of her carbon fiber cello. She covers a wide repertoire utilizing the possibilities that this range of instruments, string set-ups and bows allow.

In 2010 she released a 4-CD set featuring all six suites for unaccompanied cello by Bach played on four different cellos. This unique recording sets side by side the different sounds of historic and new instruments and compares their strengths and weaknesses.

Josephine van Lier appears on the concert stages in Canada, the United States and Europe as a soloist and chamber musician.
She is on faculty at Concordia University College of Alberta.

Between 2005 and 2009 she served as president for the Alberta String Association.

Josephine van Lier received degree in cello performance and pedagogy from the "Gronings Conservatorium" (now called Prince Claus Conservatoire) in 1992. Since 1995 she has lived in Edmonton, Alberta, Canada.

She is the cellist of the Strathcona String Quartet.

Ms. van Lier is a frequent recipient of grants and awards including the "Celebration of Women in the Arts Award of 2007" from the Edmonton Arts Council. Her concerts as soloist and with the Strathcona String Quartet were noted as "Memorable live shows from 2009"

== Instruments ==
Josephine regularly performs on four different instruments and with two different bows:

- Contemporary cello built ca. 1870 in Mirecourt, France.
- Baroque cello; Jay Haide “a l’ancienne” 2007.
- Carbon fibre cello; Luis & Clark 2005.
- 5 string violoncello piccolo; a custom built baroque instrument; Jay Haide “a l’ancienne” 2008.
- Contemporary bow; Roy Quade, 2005.
- Baroque Bow; Basil de Visser, 2007.

== Discography ==
=== Albums ===
- Bach: Six Suites for Unaccompanied Cello (UPC 775020992429 – 2010), Josephine van Lier (cello). Recorded on four different cellos; a contemporary cello, a carbon fiber cello, a baroque cello and a violoncello piccolo.
- Blue by Four (UPC 775020911420 – 2008), Strathcona String Quartet. Jazz arrangements and original jazz compositions by composer George Andrix
- Andrix: String Quartet Works (UPC 775020563629 – 2004), Strathcona String Quartet. Contemporary classical works for string quartet by composer George Andrix
