= Cello Fury =

American chamber music rock group

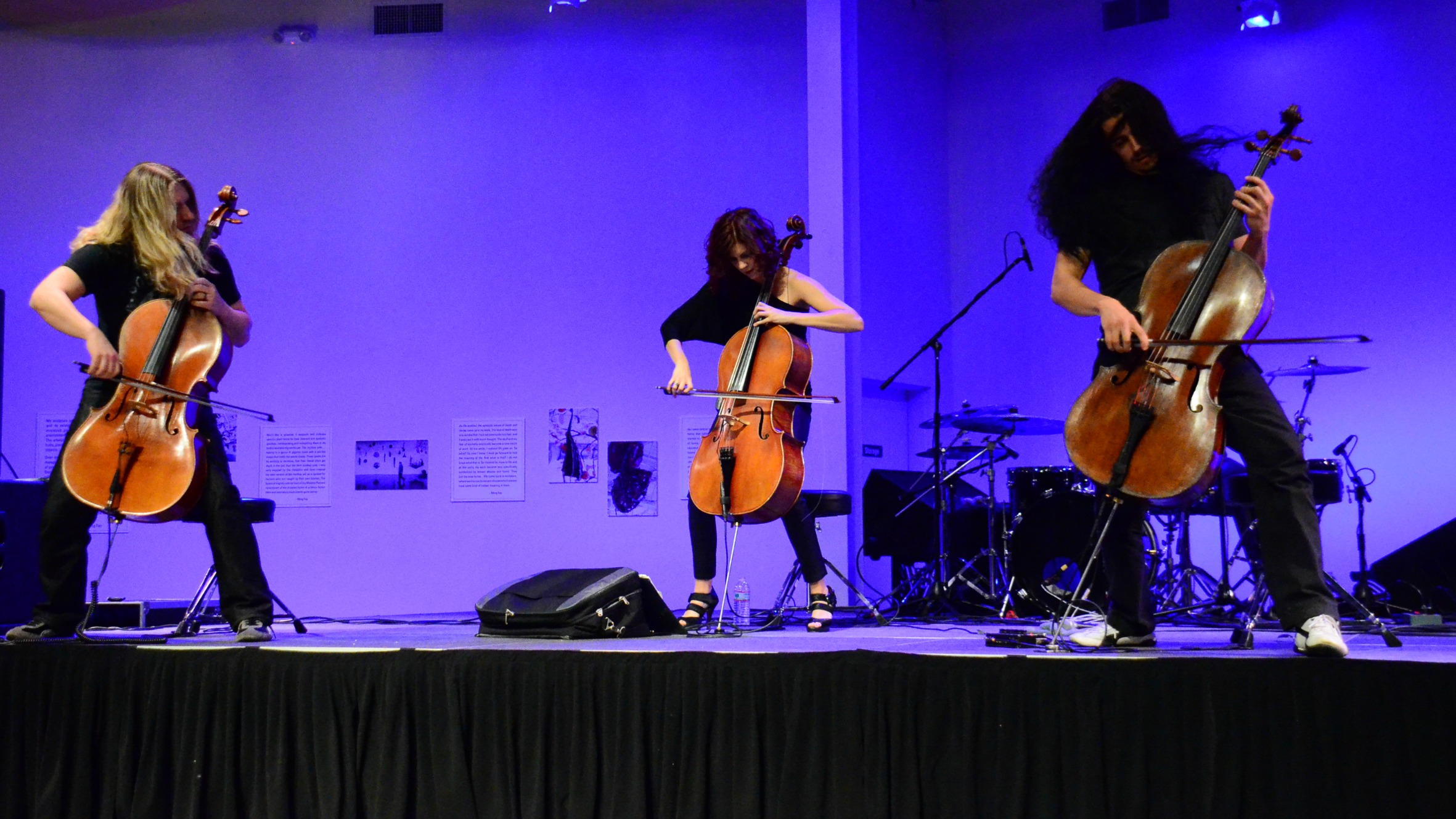
Cello Fury performing in 2013.

Cello Fury is a chamber music rock group, established in October 2009 in Pittsburgh, Pennsylvania. The group consists of Nicole Myers (cello), Simon Cummings (cello), Cecilia Caughman (cello) and David Throckmorton (drums). Cello Fury presents a fusion of progressive rock and classical music styles and performs for a wide range of audiences.

== History ==
Founding members Nicole Myers, Simon Cummings, and Ben Muñoz met as music students at Carnegie Mellon University and Duquesne University in Pittsburgh, Pennsylvania.

The group added drummer David Throckmorton and established themselves as Cello Fury in October 2009. Performing almost exclusively original material, the group found immediate success nationwide and in their hometown of Pittsburgh. The group remained in this formation, playing more than 100 shows per year and releasing three CDs of original music over the next 10 years.

In October 2018, after the release of the band's long-awaited third CD, X, cellist Ben Muñoz left the group to pursue other artistic ventures. Cecilia Caughman, another graduate of Carnegie Mellon University, was brought in to replace Muñoz.

== Awards, titles and notable performances ==
Cello Fury achieved much success in numerous Battle of the Bands competitions. They participated in Emergenza Battle of the Bands and the John Lennon Educational Tour Bus Battle of the Bands. After winning five rounds of Emergenza, the Pittsburgh Post-Gazette featured the group on their front page. A first-place win in the John Lennon Educational Tour Bus Battle of the Bands landed Cello Fury a free music video filmed by the foundation. With these successes, several Pittsburgh-based media programs such as KDKA-TV's "Pittsburgh Today Live" and WQED (TV)'s Holiday Jam, as well as their radio stations, featured the ensemble. The Pittsburgh Post-Gazette, Pittsburgh's City Guide and the indie magazine Vents Magazine featured Cello Fury on their front pages.

These titles brought Cello Fury much publicity and opportunity. Cello Fury appeared with the Pittsburgh Symphony Orchestra POPS, conducted by Marvin Hamlisch. By December 2009, Cello Fury performed at the Pittsburgh Steelers vs. Baltimore Ravens' halftime show at Heinz Field. Cello Fury performed three sold-out shows at the Byham Theatre in Pittsburgh, PA on New Year's Eve 2012.

Although based in Pittsburgh, Cello Fury performs across the country in venues located throughout 28 states. They perform at several music and art festivals across America, such as Musikfest in Bethlehem, PA, the Three Rivers Arts Festival in Pittsburgh, PA, Paper City Music Festival in Chillicothe, OH, the New River Festival in West Virginia, and three separate appearances (2015, 2017, 2019) at the annual East Shore Park Club Summer Concert Series in Cleveland, OH. Cello Fury also appeared at the South by Southwest (SXSW) music festival in March 2013 and 2014. In addition to traveling the country, Cello Fury traveled to Italy in 2010 to premiere Efraín Amaya's opera La Bisbetica Domata as solo instrumentalists. Cello Fury also performs at colleges and universities throughout the mid-Atlantic states, including Dartmouth College, Penn State University, and Oberlin College. Cello Fury endorses Thomastik-Infeld Strings.

Besides performing, Cello Fury actively participates in outreach events and programs targeted toward young musicians. They were on the roster for the "Gateway to the Arts", a non-profit program that used to sponsor musicians to educate students in the arts until the program lost its funding. In addition, the band performs outreach concerts for "Class Acts Arts" in Maryland, Virginia and Washington, D.C and for "Young Audiences of New Jersey and Eastern Pennsylvania". In addition to their contribution to "Gateway to the Arts", Cello Fury founded an annual strings rock camp in 2009 and taught at "Summers Dreamers" camp held at numerous Pittsburgh public schools during the summer months.

Cello Fury's music has been commissioned and featured by several modern dance companies, including Texture Contemporary Ballet, Bodiography Contemporary Ballet and at the Hessisches Staatstheater in Wiesbaden, Germany.

== Members ==
- Simon Cummings (cello/composer): Cummings is a graduate of Pittsburgh High school for Creative And Performing Arts. He received his Bachelor of Fine Arts degree from Carnegie Mellon University. He also composes and arranges the group's repertoire.
- Cecilia Caughman (cello): Caughman received her Bachelor of Fine Arts degree from the Cleveland Institute of Music and her Master of Music degree from Carnegie Mellon University.
- Nicole Myers (cello): Myers received both her Master of Music and Bachelor of Fine Arts degrees in Cello Performance from Carnegie Mellon University.
- David Throckmorton (drums): Throckmorton additionally performs with several ensembles and bands both in and outside of Pittsburgh area.

== Discography ==
- Euphoria (2025)
- X (2018)
- Symphony of Shadows (2013)
- Cello Fury (2011)
- Cello Fury collaborated with Baroque flutist Steven Schultz on composer and professor Nancy Galbraith's album Other Sun (2011).

== Videos ==
- Against All Odds
- Infinity Rises
