= Sinfonia Concertante for Violin, Viola, Cello and Orchestra (Mozart) =

Sinfonia Concertante by Wolfgang Amadeus Mozart

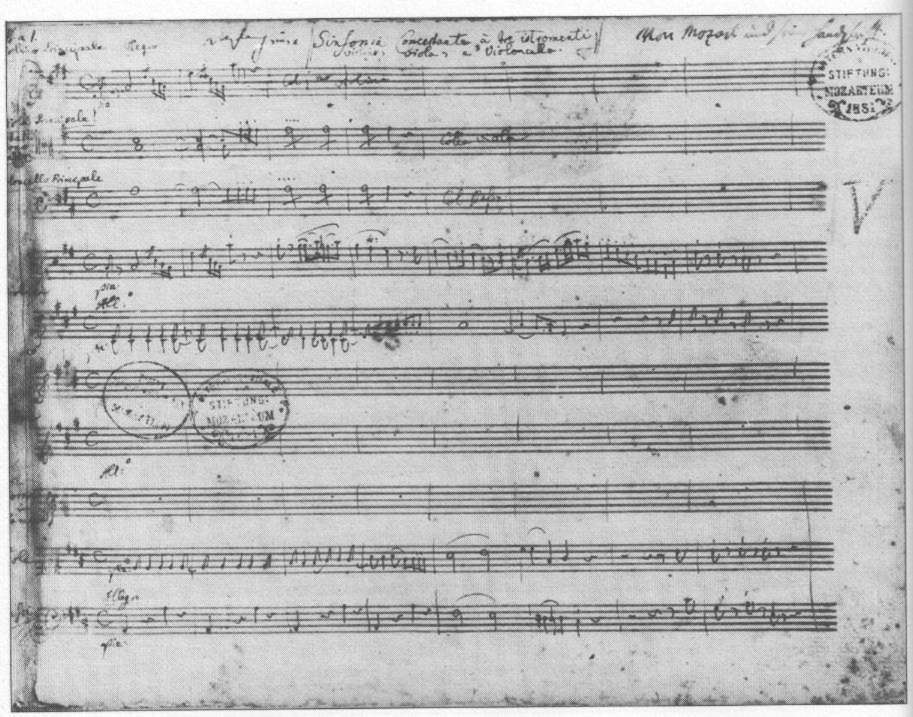
Mozart's autograph of page 1

The Sinfonia Concertante for Violin, Viola, Cello and Orchestra in A major, K. Anh. 104 (320e), is an incomplete composition by Wolfgang Amadeus Mozart.

== Background ==
Mozart is believed to have started work on this concerto around the same time as the Sinfonia Concertante in E-flat major K. 364. For unknown reasons Mozart abandoned the work after writing 134 bars of the opening movement.

British composer Philip Wilby, who completed the movement in 1989, notes similarities between K. Anh. 104 and its counterpart, K. 364. He mentions scoring similarities (in fact, they both share the exact same orchestration), the tuning of the viola, similar passages and rhythmic patterns. Wilby's reconstruction of the work is substantially based on the opening movement of K. 364.

He also notes the experimental writing of the cello part, and that this work holds a historical importance within Mozart's output; the fact that it is his only writing for solo cello and orchestra known as of present, with a lost Cello Concerto in F major, K. 206a still being documented in the composer's catalogue, and a possibility of it being discovered in the future. The cello part also employs Jean-Louis Duport's newly introduced technique of using the thumb in order to reach higher registers (as the work contains a very demanding rising figure to a G-sharp from the bass within the course of a single bar). This technique was discussed in Duport's Essai sur le doigté du violoncelle et sur la conduite de l'archet ("Essay on the fingering of the violoncello and on the conduct of the bow").

== Structure ==
As completed the work consists of a single movement, Allegro.

== Completions ==
Several composers have completed the movement.

- Around 1870, Otto Bach composed a completion which Dennis Pajot described as having a very obvious join between the part written by Mozart and the part written by Bach.
- In 1969, Robert D. Levin wrote a completion that was more sympathetic to the surviving material.
- A completion by Philip Wilby was recorded in June 1989 for The Complete Mozart Edition, with Iona Brown, Nobuko Imai and Stephen Orton with the Academy of St. Martin in the Fields.
- In 1991, Japanese composer Shigeaki Saegusa wrote a highly original completion, commissioned by the International Mozarteum Foundation.
- In 2017, the contemporary Filipino-British composer Jeffrey Ching's three-movement completion, published by Verlag Neue Musik with Ching's original cadenzas, was premiered by the Dresden Staatskapelle under Michail Jurowski.
- Italian composer Alessandro Solbiati wrote a completion for I Solisti Aquilani, and it played first time in Rotterdam during International Viola Congress 2018 (soloists: Daniele Orlando, violin – Gianluca Saggini, viola – Giulio Ferretti, cello).
- German composer Hans Ueckert announced he was working on a completion for the Octava Chamber Orchestra.
