= Lindsay Mac =

American musician

- Genres: Folk
- Labels: Taiga Records, Red Cello Records
- Website: https://lindsaymacmusic.com/

Lindsay Mac is an American singer, songwriter, and cellist, based in Cambridge, Massachusetts.

== Early life and education ==
Mac was raised in Iowa City, Iowa. Mac began playing the cello at the age of nine.

Mac attended Dartmouth College, and her interest in becoming a classical cellist led her to study abroad at the Royal College of Music in London. Mac briefly left Dartmouth after being accepted to the San Francisco Conservatory of Music. While there, she had concluded that classical music was not her calling.

Returning to receive her bachelor's degree from Dartmouth, and living in a wood-heated New Hampshire cabin, Mac began adapting her cello technique. Though she had decided that her dream was to be a singer/songwriter, she remained committed to the cello as her instrument. “I just wanted to take my love for the cello and put it into a context in which I felt I was really in touch with my muse.”

Mac enrolled in the Berklee College of Music in Boston but was anxious to begin performing.

== Career ==
She soon hit the road playing clubs and folk festivals. She performs as a solo act or with a backing band and has sat in with other artists; including Catie Curtis and Michelle Shocked. She has also opened for Curtis, as well as k.d. lang, Glen Phillips, Vance Gilbert, and Girlyman.

== Cello technique ==
In order to stand while singing on stage, Mac harnesses the cello with a shoulder strap and does not use a bow. She plucks the strings in a manner similar to the traditional pizzicato technique, but largely employs a more percussive approach. The strings are alternately strummed like a guitar or slapped like a bass.

While rehabilitating from a back injury, Mac was motivated and inspired by the pop music playing over the gym's stereo. Unable to play the cello comfortably, Mac built a stand-up computer workstation and started composing on the Garage Band software platform. The cello is almost absent in Mac's third record, the electro/synth-pop EP album, Animal Again, released in 2015.

== Discography ==
- Small Revolution (2005)
- Stop Thinking (2008)
- Animal Again EP (2015)
