= Luis and Clark =

Luis and Clark, or L&C, is a company that sells carbon fiber stringed instruments designed by cellist Luis Leguía (Louie) of the Boston Symphony Orchestra. The company's product line consists of violins, violas, cellos, double bass', and half-sized cellos.

== Conception ==
Leguía was on his catamaran one day in 1989 when he heard a resonant humming sound and noticed that the sound of the waves against the carbon fiber was louder than it was against the wood. Luis Leguía’s career as a cellist inspired him to design his ideal cello. in carbon fiber. After five years of experimenting, he approached carbon fiber expert Steve Clark, head of Rhode Island's Vanguard Sailboats, to form the company "Luis and Clark" in 2000. Clark eventually led Leguía to Matt Dunham of Clear Carbon and Components, who continues to manufacture all the Luis and Clark instruments.

== Instruments ==
The instruments are all made in the United States with a 92.57% carbon-epoxy matrix.

They are designed to be held closer to the body, a result of less material used in the instruments' creation.
