= Endpin =

Supporting part of a cello or double bass

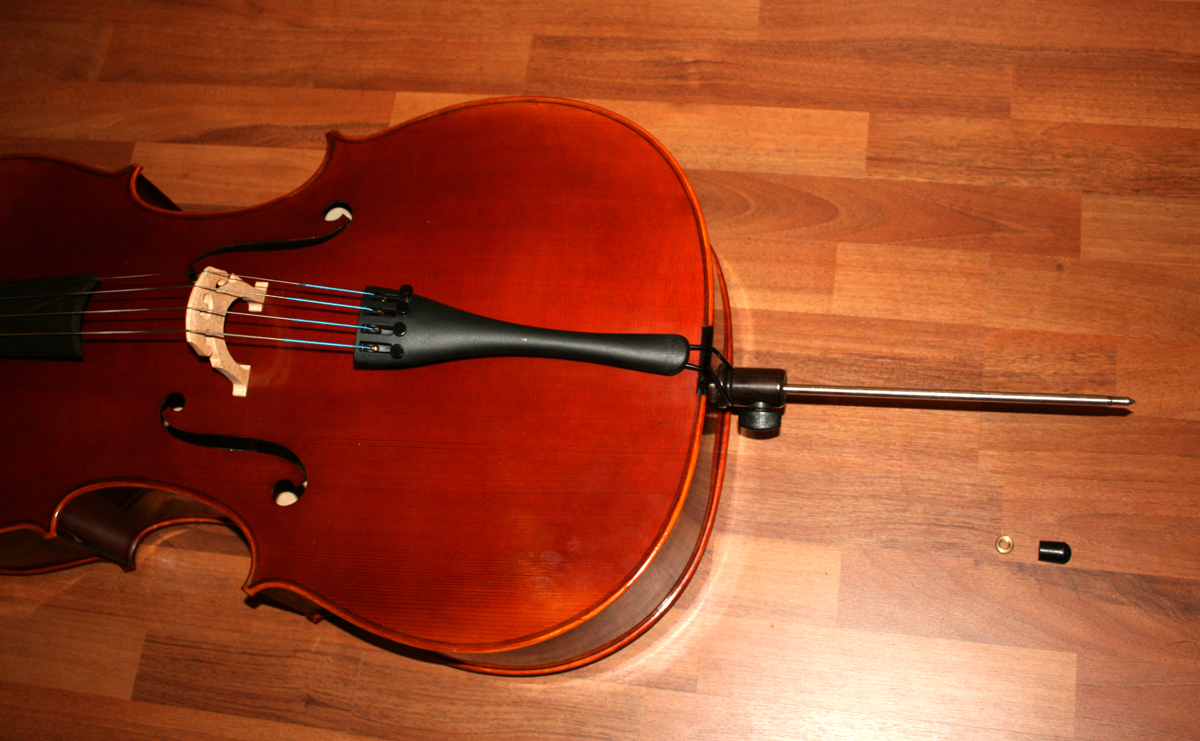
The extended endpin of a cello, a black rubber cap and accompanying screw lie next to it

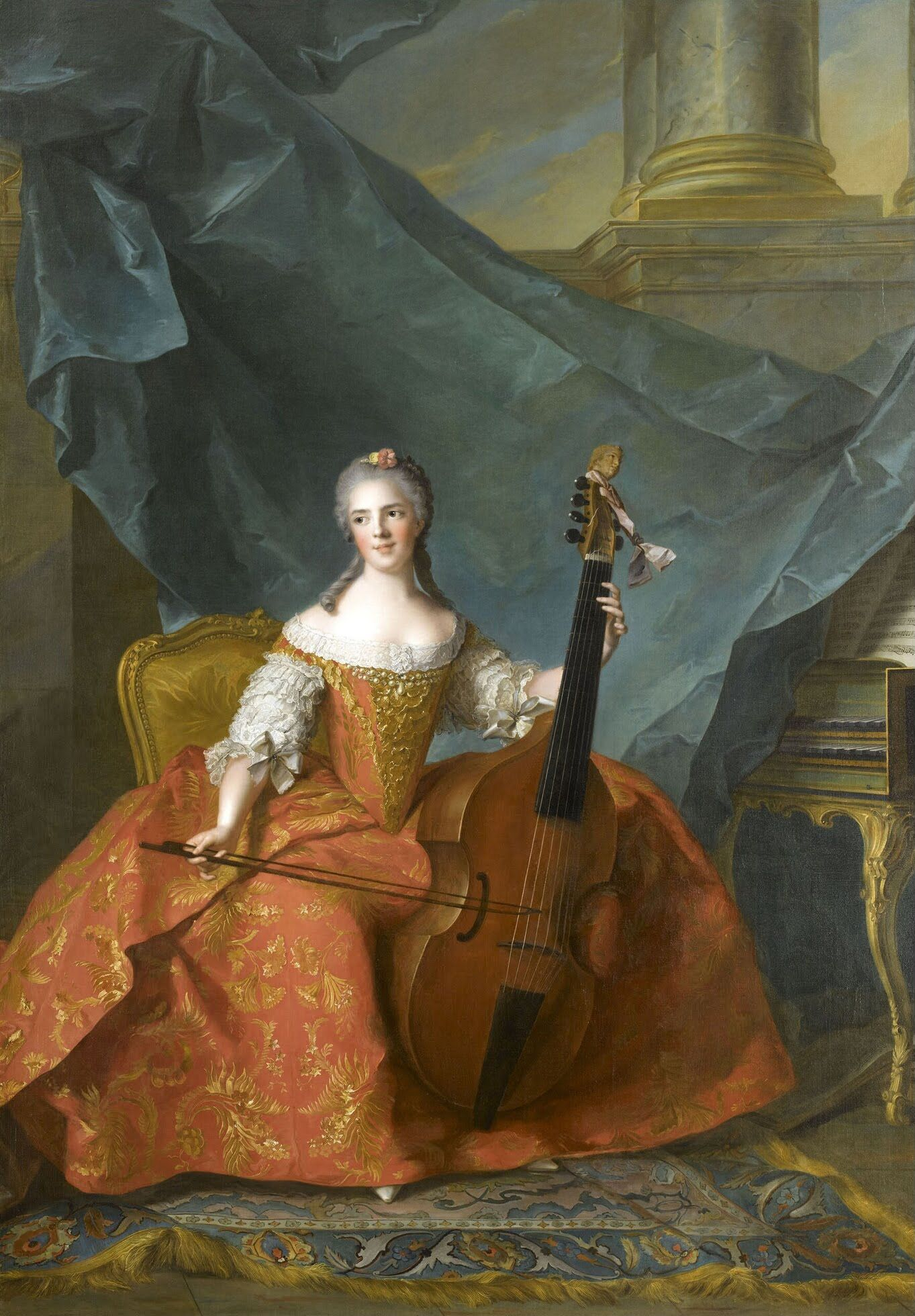
A painting showing a woman of the 18th century playing the viola da gamba without an endpin.

An endpin, more commonly spelled end pin and also called tailpin, is the component of a cello or upright bass that makes contact with the floor to support the instrument's weight. It is made of metal, carbon fiber, or, occasionally, wood, and is typically extensible from the bottom of the instrument, secured there with a thumbscrew or other tightening mechanism. Most bass clarinets and contrabassoons also have a similar fixture. Endpins became a standard part of the cello in the mid-19th century. Before then, celli were held tightly with the legs. Some performers of pieces of baroque music continue to not use an endpin during period performances. The endpin is widely credited to making the cello more appealing to play for women, who were before compelled to hold the instrument on the floor due to the complicated dress and fashion of the time.

== Types of endpins ==
Endpins are usually tipped with a point to stick into the floor, which is sometimes capped with black rubber to preserve the floor's surface and provide friction. Generally, endpins are parallel to the long axis of the instrument, but some cellists and bassists fit their instruments with a Tortelier-style endpin, which angles more towards the floor, improving mobility at the expense of stability. Also, some endpins have a secondary extension for tall musicians. The endpin also may have notches cut in it, allowing it to have extra holding strength at these points.

== Endpin anchors ==
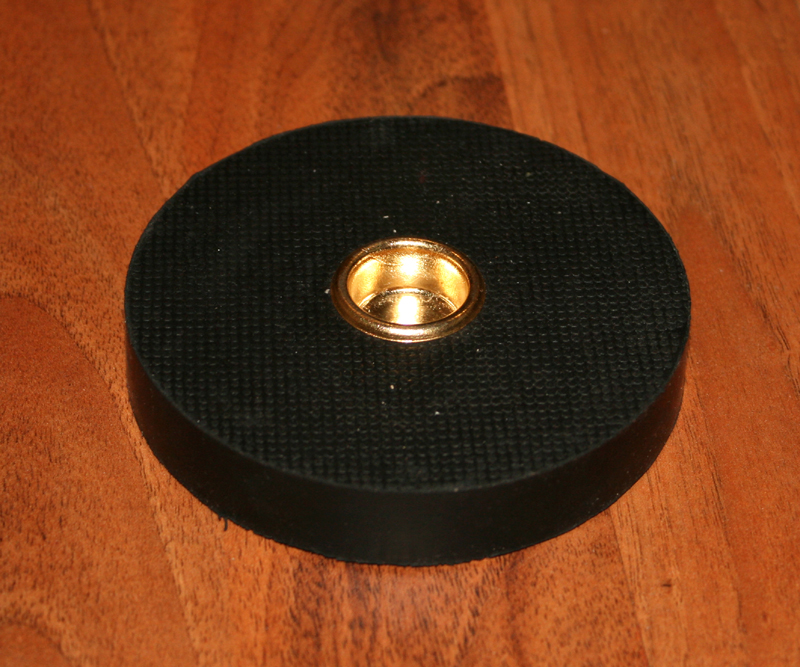
"Sure-Stop"-style endpin holder

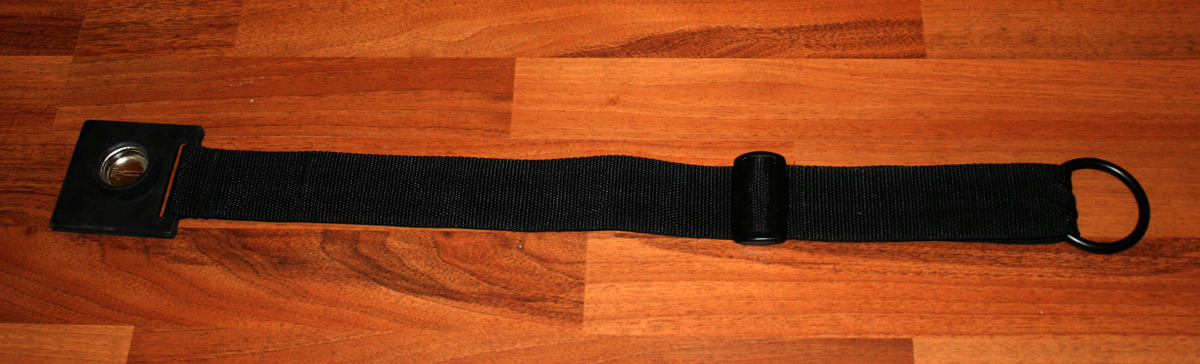
"Xeros"-style endpin stopper strap

Two examples of cello endpin stoppers, used to prevent a cello from slipping on the floor while it is being played. The hoop of the strap is anchored to the leg of the cellist's chair.

Left-hand pressure on a cello fingerboard, acting against the fulcrum of the player's chest and/or knees, may cause the endpin to slip forward on the floor. To prevent this slippage, objects known as "endpin stoppers", "pinstops", "donuts", "black holes", "endpin anchors", "endpin holders", "spike holders" or "rock stops" are sometimes used.

One type of endpin stopper is placed between the endpin and the floor to add surface area and enhance friction, and stands alone. With this sort, the base must be made out of a non-slippery material like rubber. One very common type consists of a pliable disc surrounding a circular cup to hold the endpin's tip, such as the "Sure-Stop".

A different sort of endpin stopper uses the musician's chair as an anchor. T-shaped wooden stoppers are anchored by placing the top of the T behind the chair legs. Straight plank stoppers use one or two straps with loops at the end which are anchored around the chair legs. Since in this case the distance from the stopper to the chair is usually fixed, such stoppers typically have a line of dents running down the plank, allowing the instrument's angle to be adjusted by placing the endpin in a different dent.

Basses do not always require stoppers, being heavier and usually played in a more vertical orientation than a cello. However, bassists often use rockstops when sitting on a stool or when playing on high-glossed floors or uneven surfaces.

== Endpins and flooring ==
Pointed endpins can cause extensive damage, especially to tile and wooden flooring. Many music rooms bear evidence of this in a myriad of small holes or chips. Here, rubber tips and/or stoppers are beneficial. On carpet, the damage is less extensive. The bare tip is thus most effective in outdoor conditions, carpeted areas, and old flooring where the damage will not be as serious. However, the sharper the endpin, the more likely it is to go through the standard rubber tip.
