= Double Concerto (disambiguation) =

A double concerto is a concerto featuring two performers, or the use of a double orchestral body where the work is in concerto grosso form.

Double Concerto may also refer to:

- Double Concerto (Abrahamsen)
- Double Concerto (Bach)
- Double Concerto (Balada)
- Double Concerto (Brahms)
- Double Concerto (Bruch)
- Double Concerto (Carter)
- Double Concerto (Delius)
- Double Concerto (Harbison)
- Double Concerto (Harrison)
- Double Concerto (Henze)
- Double Concerto (Lutosławski)
- Double Concerto (Previn)
- Double Concerto (Rorem)
