= Linton Chamber Music Series =

Linton Chamber Music Series is a presenter of chamber music and educational concerts based in Cincinnati, Ohio.

== Founding and History ==
Linton Chamber Music grew out of a special concert in March 1977 to reward members of Cincinnati's historic First Unitarian Church for a successful fund-raising canvass. That concert, by the Trio d'Accordo (violinist Jorja Fleezanis, cellist Yizhak Schotten, cellist Karen Andrie) with harpsichordist Nina Johnson and flutist Rebecca Maag, prompted clarinetist Richard Waller, violinist Rosemary Waller and members of the Church to launch a chamber music series on Sunday afternoons in the Church sanctuary. It was named Linton after the street on which the Church is located in Cincinnati's Avondale neighborhood. Waller, principal clarinetist of the Cincinnati Symphony Orchestra, became artistic director.

The Linton Chamber Music series proper began in 1978-1979, with concerts in October, November, March and April. The October, 1978 inaugural was performed by Trio d'Accordo joined by CSO principal flutist George Hambrecht. The second concert, on November 12, 1978, featured pianist Andre-Michel Schub, Waller and CSO principal cellist Peter Wiley.

Schub, guest artist with the CSO that weekend, set a pattern for the Linton series, which typically presents at least one CSO guest each season. The Sunday Linton Chamber Music series of six concert programs takes place at the First Unitarian Church, north of downtown. The Encore! Linton series features five of the programs presented on the Sunday series but is on Mondays in a northern suburban location, Congregation Beth Adam.

The hallmark of the Linton series from its beginning has been presenting ad hoc rather than established ensembles, making it somewhat akin to the 19th-century house concert. Unique ensembles of classical music’s finest artists from across the world, country, and region, including musicians of the Cincinnati Symphony Orchestra as well as CSO guest artists are featured. CSO guests appear under a special arrangement with Linton, whereby soloists contracted by the orchestra are permitted to perform on Linton concerts during their visits to Cincinnati.

Various combinations of instruments and players bring a fresh approach and energy to performing and programming that inspires both audiences and artists. Artists also connect with audiences by sharing their musical perspectives from the stage. Performances are in intimate and acoustically warm settings where audiences surround the musicians, creating a remarkable atmosphere.

In 1993, Linton Music Series was one of six national grantees of the Chamber Music America Presenter Expansion Program, enabling it to hire its first full-time administrative director. Linton was incorporated in 1994, earning its 501(c) (3) designation in 1995. Concerts are recorded and broadcast by Cincinnati public radio station WGUC-FM.

In April 2009, Waller stepped down as Linton artistic director and was succeeded by artistic directors Jaime Laredo and Sharon Robinson. The 2018-19 will celebrate Linton’s 40th Anniversary and will engage approximately 3,000 audience members.

== Structure ==
Linton Incorporated has a 10-member board of directors. Heading the administrative staff is executive director Julie Montgomery. In addition to Jaime Laredo and Sharon Robinson, as its Artistic Directors, Michael Chertock serves as its Associate Artistic Director.

== Educational Concerts ==
Linton's educational wing, "Peanut Butter and Jam Sessions", an early childhood educational concert series was created in 1994. The 40-minute programs, presented by small ensembles on Saturday mornings in churches and community centers, introduce musical concepts and instruments and tell stories through music. Audience participation is encouraged, and children are invited to meet the musicians, touch their instruments and ask questions afterward. In addition to its Saturday programs, several free concerts are offered each season to provide access to families not otherwise able to attend.

In 1999, "Peanut Butter and Jam Sessions" received a Post-Corbett Award for Excellence in Arts Education and Outreach from the Scripps Howard Foundation.

Another Linton spinoff, "The Mayor's 801 Plum Concerts", created in 1994 to attract young urban professionals and featuring diverse, contemporary programming in an early Friday evening, downtown setting (Cincinnati City Hall), has been discontinued.

== Artists ==
Artists who have performed on the Linton Chamber Music Series include Nancy Allen, Emanuel Ax, Joshua Bell, Yefim Bronfman, John Browning, Chee-Yun, James Conlon, John Dalley, Eddie Daniels, Jeremy Denk, Leon Fleisher, Claude Frank, Pamela Frank, Stewart Goodyear, Robin Graham, Augustin Hadelich, Benjamin Hochman, Daniel Hope, Helen Huang, Paavo Järvi, Ani Kavafian, Ida Kavafian, Alexander Kerr, Benny Kim, Eric Kim, Igor Kipnis, Jennifer Koh, Jaime Laredo, Cho-Liang Lin, Jesús López-Cobos, Lee Luvisi, Ann Marie McDermott, Robert McDuffie, Anthony McGill, Midori, Truls Mørk, Anton Nel, Jon Kimura Parker, William Preucil, Sharon Robinson, Philip Ruder, Nadja Salerno-Sonnenberg, Andre-Michel Schub, Gil Shaham, Orli Shaham, Arnold Steinhardt, Steven Tenenbom, James Tocco, Michael Tree, Pablo Villegas, Lars Vogt, Liang Wang, André Watts, and Peter Wiley.

== Highlights and premieres ==
Inaugural concert. November 12, 1978. Clarinetist Richard Waller, pianist Andre-Michel Schub and cellist Peter Wiley perform Brahms' Trio in A Minor, Op.114, Schumann's "Fantasiestücke" for Clarinet and Piano and Beethoven's Sonata in G Major for Cello and Piano.

Cincinnati Symphony Orchestra music director Jesús López-Cobos becomes the first conductor to perform on the Linton Series, leading Milhaud's La création du monde and Mozart's Serenade K.361, on February 28, 1988.

Benefit concert for Greater Cincinnati Coalition for the Homeless performed by violinist Nadja Salerno-Sonnenberg, cellist David Finckel and pianist Wu Han. February 5, 1992.

Cincinnati premiere of Ellen Taaffe Zwilich's String Trio (1982). September 24, 1995.

World premiere of Jeffrey Mumford's "a still radiance within dark air", commissioned by Cincinnati public radio station WGUC-FM. Colin Jagger, conductor. October 14, 1998.

Cincinnati premiere of Christopher Rouse's "Compline", Jose-Luis Novo, conductor. October 14, 1998.

Cincinnati Symphony Orchestra music director Paavo Järvi conducts Stravinsky's L'histoire du soldat, January 18, 2004.

Cincinnati premiere of "Forbidden Music", works by Erwin Schulhoff and Victor Ullmann suppressed during the Nazi era, led by conductor James Conlon. December 5, 2004.

North American premiere of Sonata for Violin and Piano by Georg Tintner performed by violinist Cho-Liang Lin and pianist Helen Huang. March 20, 2005.

Cincinnati Public Radio announcer Naomi Lewin narrates William Walton's "Façade". Eric Dudley, conductor. April 10, 2005.

Cincinnati premiere of Quintet for Violin, Viola, Cello, Contrabass, and Piano by Ellen Taaffe Zwilich, co-commissioned by Ann & Harry Santen for Linton Chamber Music, performed by the Kalichstein-Laredo-Robinson Trio, Michael Tree, and Harold Robsinson. January 15, 2012.

Cincinnati premiere of "Inventions on a Marriage", Duo for Violin & Cello by Richard Danielpour, consortium commission performed by Jaime Laredo & Sharon Robinson. May 13, 2012.

World premiere of "Pas de Trois", by Ellen Taaffe Zwilich, commissioned by Ann & Harry Santen for Linton Chamber Music, performed by the Kalichstein-Laredo-Robinson Trio. September 18, 2016.

Cincinnati Symphony Orchestra music director Louis Langreé performs his Cincinnati public debut as a pianist with mezzo-soprano, Kelley O'Connor. February 26, 2017.

== Sources ==
- Chute, James. "Chamber Music is a Hit." Cincinnati Post. November 13, 1978.
- Cooklis, Ray. "Linton Reluctant to Tamper with Success." Cincinnati Enquirer. September 30, 1984.
- Gelfand, Janelle. "Linton Series Passed to Eager New Hands." Cincinnati Enquirer. February 1, 2009.
- Hutton, Mary Ellyn. "Music on Plum." Cincinnati Post, March 29, 2007. "Building Bridges: Black Violin" and"Cool Classical, Hot Salsa." Cincinnati Post, June 1, 2007. “Violinist Zach Brock Jazzes up City Hall.” “Toe Rocks, Opens Doors at City Hall.”
- Kanaga, Donna. "City Hall Goes Classical." Cincinnati Enquirer. May 5, 1995.
- Malitz, Nancy. "Digital Dazzler Schub to Repeat Success on Linton Music Series." Cincinnati Enquirer. October 18, 1979.
- Stroff, Stephen M. "Tattling a Well-Kept Secret." Cincinnati Magazine. October, 1980.
