= Double Concerto (Zwilich) =

The Concerto for Violin, Violoncello and Orchestra is a double concerto for violin, cello, and orchestra by the American composer Ellen Taaffe Zwilich. The work was commissioned by the Louisville Orchestra for the violinist Jaime Laredo and the cellist Sharon Robinson and in memory of the sculptor Albert Wein. It was first performed by Laredo, Robinson, and the Louisville Orchestra under the direction of Lawrence Leighton Smith on December 5, 1991. The piece is dedicated to Lawrence Leighton Smith and the Louisville Orchestra.

== Composition ==
The Double Concerto is cast in two numbered movements and has a performance duration of roughly 18 minutes. In the score program note, Zwilich described the two movements as "both employing related expansive themes in a mixture of speeds and moods." She continued, "The first begins lyrically, becomes agitated, then returns to a quiet close. The second movement is just the reverse; it starts very fast, changes character into an extended slow section, and finally returns to the faster tempos in an extended coda."

=== Instrumentation ===
The work is scored for solo violin and cello and an orchestra consisting of two flutes, oboe, English horn, two clarinets, two bassoons, two horns in F, two trumpets, timpani, and strings.

== Reception ==
Reviewing a recording of the work performed by Laredo, Robinson, and the Florida State University Orchestra conducted by Michael Stern, John Fleming of the Tampa Bay Times described the concerto as "Zwilich at her best, perhaps because she is a violinist." He added, "Cellist Sharon Robinson and violinist Jaime Laredo mesh beautifully, their instruments often coming together as one complex, beguiling voice. Stern and the FSU students do a fine job of creating an orchestral texture that includes some splendidly forthright brass play."

== See also ==
- List of double concertos for violin and cello
