= Richard Waller (musician) =

American clarinettist and artist (1929–2022)

- Born: November 16, 1929; Philadelphia, Pennsylvania, U.S.
- Died: November 29, 2022 (aged 93)
- Occupation(s): Clarinetist and visual artist
- Known for: Founder of the Linton Chamber Music Series

Richard Waller (November 16, 1929 – November 29, 2022) was an American clarinetist, visual artist and founder/former artistic director of the Linton Chamber Music Series in Cincinnati, Ohio.

== Early life and career ==
Richard Waller was born in Philadelphia, Pennsylvania on November 16, 1929, to Thomas (Tevye) and Sonia (née Castleman) Waller.

Waller studied clarinet in Long Beach, California with Fred Ohlendorf, Ralph Sarber and Hoyt Mosher. He was also a student of Kalmon Bloch, principal clarinetist of the Los Angeles Philharmonic Orchestra. He continued his studies at the Juilliard School with Daniel Bonade, former principal clarinetist of the Philadelphia Orchestra and the Cleveland Orchestra. He was principal clarinetist of the American Ballet Theatre Orchestra in 1949–1950, after which, on the advice of Leonard Bernstein that a musician should also "get a good education", he enrolled at Occidental College in Los Angeles, where he graduated in 1954 with a Bachelor of Arts degree in music.

Waller was a member of the U.S. Navy Band in Washington, D.C. from 1954 to 1960 and became principal (concertmaster) in 1957. He toured North and South America and played for White House occasions.

== Cincinnati Symphony Orchestra ==
In 1960, Waller joined the Cincinnati Symphony Orchestra under music director Max Rudolf. He became principal clarinetist in 1961. He was soloist with the orchestra many times, performing concertos by Mozart, Carl Nielsen, Aaron Copland (with Copland conducting) and Easley Blackwood, Jr. (world premiere, 1965); also Debussy's Premiere Rhapsody and Symphony Concertante for Two Clarinets by Ingolf Dahl (world premiere, 1976).

Waller traveled with Rudolf and the CSO on a round-the-world-tour sponsored by the U.S. State Department in 1966 and on tour in Japan with music director Jesús López-Cobos in 1990. Waller played under four CSO music directors, Rudolf, Thomas Schippers, Michael Gielen and Lopez-Cobos, as well as Cincinnati Pops conductor Erich Kunzel. He retired from the orchestra in 1994.

== The Linton Chamber Music Series ==
In 1978, Waller, violinist Rosemary Waller and members of the First Unitarian Church in Cincinnati founded the Linton Chamber Music Series. Through an informal collaboration with the Cincinnati Symphony Orchestra, the series presents CSO guest artists and other invited guests to perform chamber music with principal players of the orchestra. Waller became artistic director and performed frequently on the series.

Waller performed at the Marlboro, Tanglewood, Aspen, Carmel, Banff, Bowdoin and Sarasota music festivals, serving as principal clarinetist of the Aspen Music Festival Orchestra and a member of the artist faculty of the Aspen Music School from 1976 to 1994. He was coordinator of the House Music Series at the Aspen Festival from 1990 to 2003. Waller was adjunct professor of clarinet at the University of Cincinnati – College-Conservatory of Music from 1960 to 1979.

An avid proselytizer for music, Waller and Cincinnati Symphony tubist Michael Thornton formed the "Tonette and Tuba Society" in the early 1980s, later expanding it to "TTX & M" with the addition of CSO percussionist Richard Jensen (xylophone) and CSO double bassist Frank Proto (melodica). The group performed for on-air public radio fund drives, CSO pension fund concerts and the like.

Waller stepped down as artistic director of the Linton Series in February 2009, when he was succeeded by co-artistic directors Jaime Laredo and Sharon Robinson.

== Visual artist ==
Waller began painting part-time in 1974. It became a major focus in 1996. Self-taught, he worked in acrylics and oils on wood, masonite and canvas, utilizing an abstract, free association style. Ranging in size from 8 x 12 feet to 12 x 12 inches, all are entitled "Contrasts" followed by a Roman numeral. The title, which implies a changing, evolving style, was inspired by Béla Bartók's "Contrasts" for Clarinet, Violin and Piano.

Waller exhibited his artwork in Aspen and Cincinnati. Owners of his paintings include Gil Shaham, Ann-Marie McDermott and Michael Lubin, Nadja Salerno-Sonnenberg and Colorado Public Radio president Max Wysick. In 2014, he opened a gallery on historic Court Street in Cincinnati Ohio, Dick Waller's ArtPlace, where he also maintained a studio. The gallery was often used for community gatherings and events.

== Further career and activities ==
Waller was instrumental in founding the Chamber Music Network of Greater Cincinnati in February, 2005. He taught a class called "For the Love of Music" at the University of Cincinnati's Osher Life Learning Institute, and he worked on a series of one-minute spots for public radio consisting of funny stories by musicians.

Waller received the Scripps Corbett Award for Lifetime Achievement in the Arts from the Scripps Howard Foundation in April 2009.

Waller lived in Cincinnati until his death on November 29, 2022, at the age of 93. He was survived by his daughters Margy, Deborah, Suzanne, and Amy Waller; as well as their mother, Rosemary Waller, a brother, David Waller, and a grandson, Avery Cruz.
