= Collage (Horner) =

Concerto composed by James Horner

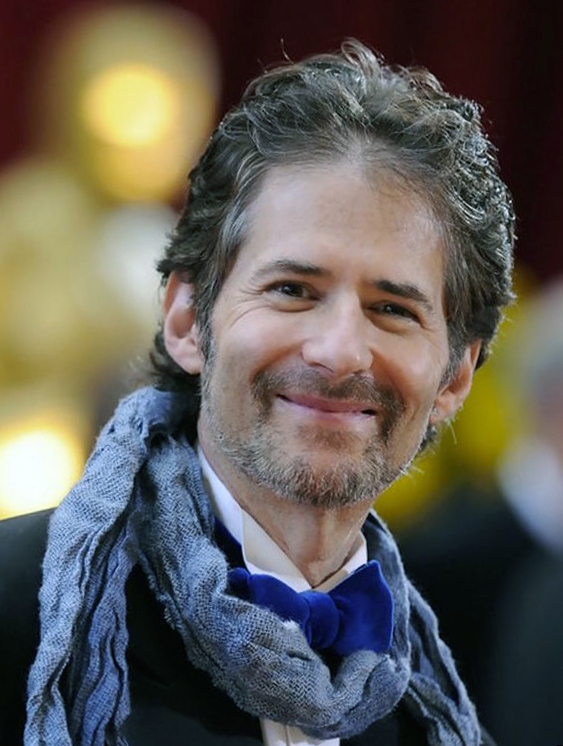
James Horner in 2010

Collage: A Concerto for Four Horns and Orchestra is a concerto for four horns and orchestra by the American composer James Horner. The piece was commissioned by the Houston Symphony and the International Horn Society and was premiered on March 27, 2015, at the Royal Festival Hall in London. The premiere was conducted by Jaime Martín and performed by the London Philharmonic Orchestra with soloists David Pyatt, John Ryan, James Thatcher, and Richard Watkins. Collage was Horner's last completed concert work before his death in June 2015.

== Composition ==
The London Philharmonic announced in January 2014 that it would be premiering a new concerto by James Horner—the news came only a few months before the premiere of Horner's double concerto for violin and cello, Pas de Deux. Horner had previously worked with three of the four soloists on his film scores and had himself played the French horn in his youth. In the program notes for the world premiere, Horner commented on the inception of the piece, saying:

I have known three of this evening's four soloists for the last 20 years or so of my professional life as a film composer. Jim Thatcher was the principal horn on one of my first major films, Cocoon. David Pyatt and Richard Watkins have each served as principal horn on so many of my films that I've lost track! It was always a dream of mine to assemble this group of brilliant soloists in one room and have them play on a film score. We'd been discussing this for quite a while when fate intervened and David 'officially' asked me to write a four-horn concerto using the above mentioned players. I jumped at the chance and the piece you will hear tonight is the fruit of that labour.

== Reception ==
Critical response to Collage has been mixed. Colin Anderson of Classical Source criticized the work as one of "Horner's inoffensive if more and more dull piece[s]," saying, "His Collage started promisingly with an ear-catching refrain, giving the scenic impression of the four horn-players calling across mountaintops, descriptive music that went straight to the senses. But not for long, for Horner's reliance on repetition and trite motifs made the piece blander and blander." The music critic Alan Sanders similarly praised the orchestration while criticizing the form, saying:

As a renowned film composer Horner certainly knows how to manage a solo horn quartet effectively and to score skilfully for a large orchestral body, which here included two pianos, a celesta, xylophone and other percussion devices. The actual sounds of the orchestral palette in this work were usually attractive and often intriguingly piquant. But after a while the lack of rhythmic variety in this single-movement concerto became apparent: everything flowed by at a steady medium-slow pace, and the quality of musical invention was not very inspired. It sounded like decent film music, but without any visual aspect to stimulate the imagination, so that the mind's eye instead created its own image of rocky vistas and rolling plains.

== Recording ==
A recording of Collage was made by the London Philharmonic Orchestra and the original soloists shortly before Horner's death. It was released commercially through Decca Records on September 23, 2016.
