= Kalichstein-Laredo-Robinson Trio =

American classical piano trio

The Kalichstein–Laredo–Robinson Trio is an American piano trio consisting of violinist Jaime Laredo, cellist Sharon Robinson, and pianist Joseph Kalichstein. The trio is one of the longest-lasting chamber ensembles with all of its original members, having debuted in 1977 at the inauguration of president Jimmy Carter. In 2001 it was named by Musical America as Ensemble of the Year, and in 2011 it was awarded the Samuel Sanders Collaborative Artists Award from The Classical Recording Foundation. In the 2003–2004 season, the John F. Kennedy Center for the Performing Arts appointed Kalichstein–Laredo–Robinson Ensemble-in-Residence. The trio is widely regarded as perhaps the most seminal piano trio performing today, and are noted for the high quality of their interpretations of the trio repertoire.

== Activities ==
During the classical season, the Kalichstein–Laredo–Robinson trio typically maintains a heavy touring schedule. Over the years it has performed in concerts and festivals across the Americas, Europe, Asia, and Australia and New Zealand, including Carnegie Hall's Centennial series, Lincoln Center for the Performing Arts' Great Performers Series, and Tanglewood Music Festival.

The trio is also known for commissioning and performing new works, having commissioned and debuted pieces by contemporary composers including Richard Danielpour, David Del Tredici, Daron Aric Hagen, Hafliði Hallgrímsson, John Harbison, Katherine Hoover, Leon Kirchner, David Ludwig, David Ott, Arvo Pärt, André Previn, Ned Rorem, Stanley Silverman, Joan Tower, Ezequiel Viñao, and Ellen Taaffe Zwilich. The trio has also recorded extensively, with fourteen albums to its credit. They most recently released a CD of the Schubert's piano trios and the "Arpeggione" Sonata; additionally, Laredo and Robinson also released in 2011 a CD of double concertos for violin and cello called Triple Doubles.

All members of the trio are actively engaged in the world of music education. Jaime Laredo and Sharon Robinson both currently teach at the Cleveland Institute of Music, where they became faculty in 2012, while Joseph Kalichstein teaches piano at the Juilliard School. In honor of the trio, the Chamber Music Society of Detroit has created the Kalichstein–Laredo–Robinson International Trio Award (KLRITA), "to encourage and enhance the careers of accomplished and extraordinarily promising young and rising piano trios" which will be chosen every other year in perpetuity."

Joseph Kalichstein, the pianist in the trio, died on March 31, 2022, at the age of 76.

== Discography ==
- Schubert The Piano Trios & "Arpeggione" Sonata (Bridge): Piano Trio in B-flat major, D. 898 (Op. 99); Notturno in E-flat major, D. 897 (Op. 148); Piano Trio in B-flat major, "Sonatensatz", D. 28; Piano Trio in E-flat major, D. 929 (Op. 100); Sonata in A minor for Arpeggione and Piano, D. 821
- Triple Doubles: Three Double Concertos written for Jaime Laredo & Sharon Robinson (Bridge): Richard Danielpour: A Child's Reliquary (1999, 2006); David Ludwig: Concerto for Violin, Cello and Orchestra (2008); Daron Aric Hagen: Masquerade-Concerto for Violin, Cello and Orchestra (2007)
- Beethoven: Concerto for Violin, Cello, and Piano (with the English Chamber Orchestra (Chandos)
- Beethoven: Complete Cycle of Trios, Vol. 1 (Koch): Piano Trio in D major, Op. 70, No. 1 "Ghost"; Piano Trio in B-flat major "Archduke", Op. 97; Piano Trio in E-flat major, Op. 70, No. 2; Variations in E-flat major, Op. 44; Variations in G major on Wenzel Müller's "Ich bin der Schneider Kakadu", Op. 121a
- Beethoven Complete Cycle of Trios, Vol. 2 (Koch): Piano Trio No. 2 in G, Op. 1, No. 2; Piano Trio No. 3 in C minor, Op. 1, No. 3; Piano Trio in E-flat, Op. 1, No. 1, Op. 11; Trio in B-flat, WoO 39
- Brahms Complete Cycle of Trios, Vol. 1 (Koch): Piano Trio in B major, Op. 8; Piano Trio in C major, Op. 87; Clarinet Trio in A minor, Op. 114; Ricardo Morales, clarinet; Horn Trio in E-flat, Op. 40 – David Jolley, horn
- Brahms Complete Cycle of Trios, Vol. 2 (El Music International Classics): Piano Trio No. 3 opus 101; String Sextet opus 18 (arr. for trio by Theodor Kirchner), Theme And Variations For Solo Piano
- Danielpour in the Arms of the Beloved; A Child's Reliquary (Koch)
- Haydn (Dorian Recordings): Piano Trio in G major, Hob. XV: 5; Piano Trio in E minor, Hob. XV: 12; Piano Trio in C major, Hob. XV: 27; Piano Trio in E major, Hob. XV: 28
- Kirchner: Chamber Works – Trio No. 2 (Albany Records)
- "Legacies": Piano Trios written for the Kalichstein–Laredo–Robinson Trio (Koch): Kirchner Trio No. 2; Pärt Adagio for Violin, Cello and Piano; Silverman in Celebration; Zwilich Trio for Piano, Violin and Cello
- Ravel (Arabesque Recordings): Piano Trio in A minor; Sonata for Violin and Cello; Pavane pour une infante défunte for Piano; "Pavane de la Belle au bois dormant" from Ma Mère l'Oye for Cello and Piano; "Kaddisch" from Deux mélodies hébraïques for Violin and Piano; Sonate Posthume for Violin and Piano; "Malaguena" from Rhapsodie Espagnole for Cello and Piano; Pièce en forme de Habanera for Cello and Piano; "Alborada del gracioso" from Miroirs for Cello and Piano; Berceuse sur le nom de Gabriel Fauré for Violin and Piano; Menuet from Le Tombeau de Couperin for Cello and Piano; Sonata in G major for Violin and Piano
- Shostakovich (Koch): Piano Trio No. 1, Op. 8; Sonata for Cello and Piano, Op. 40; Piano Trio No. 2 in E minor, Op. 67; Sonata for Violin and Piano, Op. 134; Sonata for Viola and Piano, Op. 147
- Tchaikovsky Piano Trio in A minor, Op. 50; Arensky Piano Trio in D minor, Op. 32 (Koch)
- Brahms Piano Trio Nos. 1–3 (Op. 8, Op. 87, Op. 101); Dvořák Piano Trio in E minor, Op. 90 "Dumky"; Mendelssohn Piano Trios in D minor, Op. 49 and C minor, Op. 66 (Moss Music)
