= Holliger =

Holliger is a surname. Notable people with the surname include:

- Heinz Holliger (born 1939), Swiss composer, virtuoso oboist, and conductor
- Philipp Holliger, Swiss molecular biologist
- Ursula Holliger, (née Hänggi, 1937–2014), Swiss harpist
