= Double Concerto (Previn) =

The Double Concerto for Violin, Violoncello, and Orchestra is a 2014 composition by the German-American composer André Previn. The work was co-commissioned by the Cincinnati Symphony Orchestra and Linton Music with financial support from Ann and Harry Santen. It was additionally commissioned by the Austin Symphony Orchestra, the Detroit Symphony Orchestra, the Deutsche Kammerphilharmonie Bremen, the Kansas City Symphony, the Pacific Symphony, the Swedish Chamber Orchestra, and the Toronto Symphony Orchestra. The world premiere was given by the husband/wife duo of the violinist Jaime Laredo and the cellist Sharon Robinson with the Cincinnati Symphony Orchestra under the direction of Louis Langrée in Cincinnati on November 21, 2014. The concerto is dedicated to Jaime Laredo and Sharon Robinson.

== Composition ==
The concerto has a duration of roughly 20 minutes and is composed in three numbered movements cast in the standard fast–slow–fast form.

=== Instrumentation ===
The work is scored for a solo violin and cello and an orchestra consisting of three flutes (3rd doubling piccolo), two oboes, two clarinets, bass clarinet, two bassoons, four horns, three trumpets, three trombones, timpani, percussion, harp, and strings.

== Reception ==
The concerto has been praised by musicians and critics alike. Reviewing the world premiere, Janelle Gelfand of The Cincinnati Enquirer opined, "Sophisticated and well-crafted, Previn's new work [...] is a terrific addition to the double concerto repertoire." She added, "The heart of the concerto was the slow movement, where Previn's gift for melody was on display. Here the soloists performed its romantic theme seamlessly, and with beauty of phrasing. The movement included a soaring melody for the strings and evocative writing for horns and winds. The finale was bright, syncopated and witty, and sometimes reminiscent of Bernstein. Laredo and Robinson brought it to a stirring conclusion with deeply expressive dialogue." Libby Hanssen of The Kansas City Star said the work "leapt and crackled with unexpected colors and design" and wrote:

The thematic material of the first movement had a mercurial quality, starting angular then suddenly turning grandiose, with pockets of romanticism and more familiar-sounding resolutions. Frequent, fast tempo meter changes created evident concern for the orchestra, though the soloists’ virtuosity persevered. The second movement ("Slow") had a lovely sepia-toned quality, as though from another era, with a gorgeous simultaneous statement from the soloists. The pastiche effect returned in the final movement with aggressive strikes from brass and percussion, playful cello line and triumphant strings, culminating in a reverberant final chord.

The dedicatees Jaime Laredo and Sharon Robinson also praised the work, particularly the second movement. Laredo referred to it as "gorgeous" and "ravishing," while Robinson said, "It's a real gift, this movement. I think it's just so beautiful."

== See also ==
- List of compositions by André Previn
- List of double concertos for violin and cello
