= Leslie Edwards =

Leslie Edwards may refer to:

- Leslie Edwards (dancer) (1916–2001), British ballet dancer and ballet master
- Leslie Edwards Jr. (1925–2019), member of the Tuskegee Airmen

== See also ==
- Harold Leslie Edwards (1893–1951), Canadian World War I flying ace
