= List of double concertos for violin and cello =

This is a list of compositions for violin, cello and orchestra, ordered by the surname the of composer. The orchestra in each case is a standard symphonic orchestra unless otherwise indicated.

== A ==
- Kurt Atterberg
  - Concerto in G minor and C major for violin, cello and string orchestra, Op. 57 (1959–60)

== B ==
- Johann Christian Bach
  - Symphonies concertantes in A major (C.34) and B♭ major (C.46)
- Konrad Boehmer
  - Il combattimento (1989–90)
- Johannes Brahms
  - Double Concerto in A minor (1887)
- Johann Evangelist Brandl
  - Sinfonia Concertante, Op. 20 (1801)
- Cesar Bresgen
  - Concertino, for violin, cello and small orchestra

== C ==
- Cristian Carrara
  - Machpela, dialog for violin, cello and orchestra (2015)
- Friedrich Cerha
  - Double Concerto (1976)
- Francisco Coll
  - Double Concerto 'Les Plaisirs Illuminés' (2018)
- Gordon Shi-Wen Chin
  - Double concerto (2006)

== D ==
- Richard Danielpour
  - A Child's Reliquary (2000)
  - In the Arms of the Beloved (2001)
- Johann Nepomuk David
  - Concerto for Violin, Cello and Orchestra, Op. 68 (1971)
- Frederick Delius
  - Double Concerto (1915–16)
- Gaetano Donizetti
  - Double Concerto (Concertino) in D minor (reconstruction by J. Wojciechowski)
- Pascal Dusapin
  - At Swim-Two-Birds (2017)

== E ==
- Thierry Escaich
  - Miroir d'ombres (2006)

== F ==
- Mohammed Fairouz
  - Double Concerto States of Fantasy (2010)

== G ==
- Pierre Gaviniès
  - Concerto for Violin, Cello and Orchestra (c. 1760 - 1770)
- Philip Glass
  - Double Concerto (2010)
- Jorge Grundman
  - Concerto Sentido for Violin, Viola, Cello and String Orchestra (2007)

== H ==
- Daron Hagen
  - Masquerade (2007)
- John Harbison
  - Double Concerto for Violin and Cello (2009)
- Lou Harrison
  - Double Concerto for Violin, Cello and Gamelan (1982)
- Leopold Hofmann
  - Concerto in G major for violin, cello and string orchestra
- James Horner
  - Pas de Deux (2014)

== K ==
- Leon Kirchner
  - Concerto for Violin, Cello, 10 Winds and Percussion (1960)
- Julius Klengel
  - Concerto for Violin, Cello and Orchestra, Op. 61 (1924)

== L ==
- Ezra Laderman
  - Concerto (Edition - Schirmer) (1986)
- Henri Lazarof
  - Partita di Madrigal (25 min) (2001)

== M ==
- Tigran Mansurian
  - Double Concerto for violin, cello and string orchestra (1978)
- Norbert Moret
  - Double Concerto (1981)
- Wolfgang Amadeus Mozart
  - Sinfonia Concertante in E♭ major, K. 364 (1779) arranged

(original for violin, viola and orchestra)

== O ==
- Mark O'Connor
  - Double Concerto (For the Heroes)

== P ==
- Hans Pfitzner
  - Duo for Violin, Cello and Small Orchestra (or piano)
- Ignaz Pleyel
  - Nocturne (Serenade) in D major, Ben.201a
- André Previn
  - Double Concerto for Violin, Violoncello, and Orchestra (2014)

== R ==
- Josef Reicha
  - Concerto in D major, Op.3
- Wolfgang Rihm
  - Duo Concerto (2015)
- Robert Xavier Rodríguez
  - Favola Concertante, Ballet and Double Concerto for Violin, Cello, and String Orchestra (1975)
- Julius Röntgen
  - Double Concerto (1927)
- Ned Rorem
  - Double Concerto (1998)
- Miklós Rózsa
  - Theme and Variations

Sinfonia Concertante, Op. 29
Tema con Variazoni, Op. 29a (1958; Op. 29a is a version of the slow movement for smaller orchestra.)

== S ==
- Camille Saint-Saëns
  - La Muse et le Poète, Op. 132 (1910) - A symphonic poem with violin and cello solo
- Alfred Schnittke
  - Concerto Grosso No. 2 (1981–82)
- Percy Sherwood
  - Concerto for Violin, Cello and Orchestra (early 1900s)
- Roger Sessions
  - Double Concerto (1970–71)
- David Soldier
  - Ultraviolet Railroad (1992)
- Carl Stamitz
  - Sinfonia Concertante in D major

== T ==
- Josef Tal
  - Double Concerto for violin, cello & chamber orchestra (1969)
- Ivan Tcherepnin
  - Double Concerto (1996)

== V ==
- Henri Vieuxtemps
  - Duo brilliant, Op. 39
- Antonio Vivaldi
  - Double Concerto ("Il Proteo, o sia Il mondo al rovescio") for Violin, Cello, Strings and continuo in F major, RV 544
  - Double Concerto ("All'inglese"), for Violin, Cello, Strings & Continuo in A major, RV 546
  - Double Concerto for violin and cello and strings and continuo in B♭ major RV 547
- Antonín Vranický (also spelled Anton Wranitzky)
  - Two Concertos

== W ==
- Robert Ward
  - Dialogues (1983)

== Y ==
- Eugène Ysaÿe
  - Poème nocturne, Op. 29 (1927)

== Z ==
- Ellen Taaffe Zwilich
  - Concerto for Violin, Violoncello and Orchestra (1991)

== Other Double Concertos ==
- Hans Abrahamsen
  - Concerto for Violin, Piano, and Strings (2011)
- Elliott Carter
  - Concerto for Harpsichord and Piano with Two Chamber Orchestras (1961)
- Edison Denisov
  - Concerto for bassoon, cello and orchestra (1982)
- Witold Lutosławski
  - Concerto for Oboe, Harp and Chamber Orchestra (1980)
- Michael Nyman
  - Double Concerto for saxophone, cello and orchestra (1996–99)
- Antonio Vivaldi
  - Concerto for bassoon, cello and orchestra in E minor RV 409

== See also ==
- String instrument repertoire
- List of solo cello pieces
- List of compositions for cello and piano
- List of compositions for cello and orchestra
- List of triple concertos for violin, cello, and piano
