= David Ludwig (composer) =

American composer of classical music (born 1974)

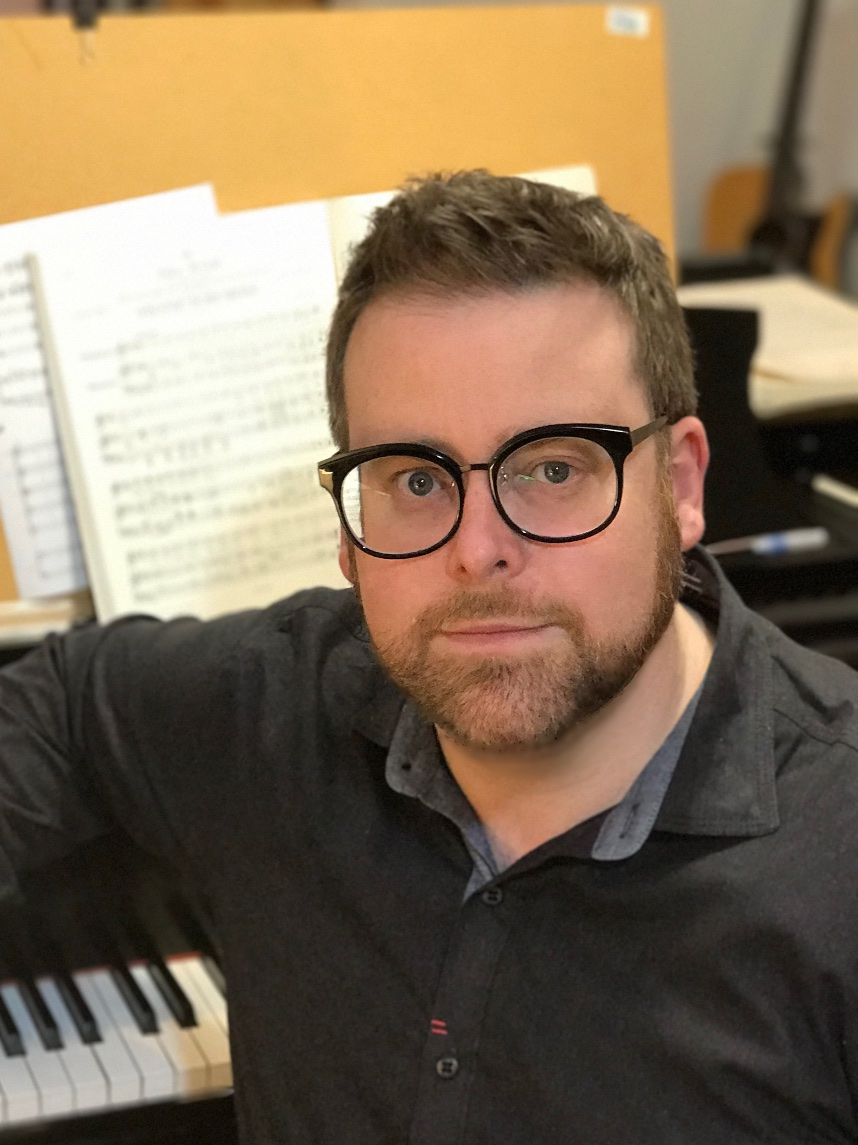
Composer David Ludwig

David Serkin Ludwig, born in Bucks County, Pennsylvania, is an American composer, teacher, and dean of music and chair of composition at The Juilliard School. His uncle was pianist Peter Serkin, his grandfather was the pianist Rudolf Serkin, and his great-grandfather was the violinist Adolf Busch. He holds positions and residencies with nearly two dozen orchestras and music festivals in the US and abroad. His choral work, The New Colossus, was performed at the 2013 presidential inauguration of Barack Obama.

Ludwig has held residencies with Meet the Composer, the Isabella Stewart Gardner Museum, MacDowell and Yaddo, and the Marlboro Music School and has held residency and faculty positions at Yellowbarn, the Ravinia Festival Steans Young Artist Program, the Atlantic Music Festival, Curtis Institute Young Artist Program, Lake Champlain Chamber Music Festival, Lake George Music Festival, Mostly Modern Festival, Shanghai International Music Festival, Lake George Music Festival, and the Seoul National University Studio 20/21 Ensemble. Ludwig is an internationally recognized lecturer on music and technology, including classical music and AI.

Ludwig has received commissions and performances from the Philadelphia Orchestra, Pittsburgh Symphony, New York Philharmonic, Minnesota Orchestra, National Symphony Orchestra, Carnegie Hall, Chamber Music Society of Lincoln Center, as well as Jonathan Biss, Jeremy Denk, Jennifer Koh, Jaime Laredo, David Shifrin, eighth blackbird, the Dover Quartet and Borromeo String Quartet, and the PRISM Quartet.

Ludwig was awarded the 2026 Guggenheim Fellowship in music composition for exceptional career achievement. He was inducted into the Philadelphia Music Alliance "Walk of Fame" in 2025. In 2022 Ludwig was awarded the Stoeger Prize from the Chamber Music Society of Lincoln Center, the largest of its kind for chamber music. He received the 2018 Pew Center for the Arts and Heritage Fellowship, as well as the First Music Award, and is a two-time recipient of the Independence Foundation Fellowship, a Theodore Presser Foundation Career Grant, and awards from New MusicUSA, The American Composers Forum, the American Music Center, Detroit Chamber Winds, and the National Endowment for the Arts. In 2021 he was made a "Steinway Artist" by Steinway and Sons

Ludwig joined the composition faculty at the Curtis Institute of Music as of the 2010–2011 academic year, and was the Artistic Director of the Curtis 20/21 Contemporary Music Ensemble and the Dean of Artistic Programs. He has also composed for films such as Cymbeline. After twenty years on the faculty of the Curtis Institute culminating as Artistic Advisor to the President and Chair of Composition, Ludwig was appointed Dean and Director of Music at The Juilliard School in May 2021 and the composition faculty in 2023.

== Education ==
Ludwig attended Oberlin College for his undergraduate degree, originally intending to take a degree in art history, but eventually taking a music degree. His teachers included Richard Hoffmann. He spent one year studying at the University of Vienna. After that, he received his M.M. from the Manhattan School of Music. He completed additional post-graduate work at the Curtis Institute of Music with Richard Danielpour, and Ned Rorem, and at the Juilliard School with John Corigliano. He received his PhD from the University of Pennsylvania, where he was the George Crumb Fellow, with his "Sonata for Violin and Piano" as his dissertation.

== Awards ==
Ludwig won the 2026 Guggenheim Fellowship and was inducted into the Philadelphia Music Alliance "Walk of Fame" in 2025. In 2023 Ludwig was given the award in music by the American Academy of Arts and Letters. In 2022, he was awarded the Chamber Music Society of Lincoln Center Stoeger Prize for outstanding contributions to Chamber Music. In 2016, Ludwig won the A.I. du Pont Award for his "significant contribution to contemporary classical music" and in 2018 received the 2018 Pew Center for Arts & Heritage Fellowship in the Arts. Ludwig was a winner of the First Music Award, a two-time recipient of the Independence Foundation Fellowship, a Theodore Presser Foundation Career Grant, and awards from New Music USA, the American Composers Forum, the American Music Center, Detroit Chamber Winds, and the National Endowment for the Arts. Choral Arts Philadelphia honored Ludwig as a City Cultural Leader in 2009.

== Personal life ==
Ludwig is married to violinist Bella Hristova.

== Compositions ==
=== Orchestral ===
- Les Adieux Concerto for Clarinet and Chamber Orchestra (2020)
- Bleeding Pines oratorio for chorus and orchestra (2020)
- Pangæa (2017) concerto for piano and strings
- Concerto for Violin and Orchestra (2015)
- Saturn Bells (2014) for solo violin and orchestra
- Pictures from the Floating World (2013) for solo bassoon and orchestra
- Virtuosity (2013), Five Micro-Concertos for String Orchestra
- Seasons Lost (2012) for two solo violins and string orchestra
- Fanfare for Sam (2011)
- La Follia (2011) for string orchestra
- Symphony No. 1 "Book of Hours" (2009) for solo soprano and orchestra
- Concerto for Violin, Cello and Orchestra (2008)
- Hanukkah Cantata for vocal soloists, SATB chorus, brass, and strings
- Concertino for solo violin and orchestra (2005)
- Concerto for Cello and Orchestra (2004)
- Radiance, serenade for oboe and strings (2003)
- NightVision (2001)

=== Chamber ===
- Seven Circles (2019) for violin and clarinet
- Prima Variations (2019) for guitar and string trio
- Nigunim (2019) for flute, violin, and piano
- Paganiniana (2018) for solo violin, flute, clarinet, violin, cello, piano, and percussion
- Spiral Galaxy (2017) for violin, cello, and piano
- Three Pictures from the Floating World (2017) for bassoon, violin, viola, and cello
- Titania's Dream (2015) for piano trio
- Rule of Three (2015) for two violins and viola
- with the lilies and the song and the stars (2014) for Dizi (or alto flute), string quartet, and piano
- Pale Blue Dot (2014) for string quartet
- Aria Fantasy (2013) for piano quartet
- Kantigas (2013) for Arabic violin, guitar, and Arabic percussion
- Josquin Microludes (2012) for saxophone quartet
- Piccola Musica Notturna (2011) for English horn, harp, string quartet
- Three Yiddish Dances (2010) for piano trio
- Sonata for Flute and Piano No. 2 "Canzoniere" (2010) for flute and piano
- Flowers in the Desert (2009) for clarinet, viola, and piano
- From the Rubayaat of Omar Khayyam (2008) for mezzo-soprano and chamber ensemble
- Aigaios (2007) for string quartet
- A Modern Psalm (2007) for jazz trio: piano, bass, drum set
- Lamentations (2006) for clarinet, harp, bass, and percussion
- Divertimento (2006) for violin, viola, cello, bass, piano
- Haiku Catharsis (2004) for Pierrot ensemble
- Four Japanese Folk Songs (2003) for euphonium and string quartet
- The Catherine Wheel (2002) for oboe quartet
- April Variations (2002) for violin, guitar, and cello
- Autumn Variations (2002) for violin, guitar, cello
- Dances of Light (2000) for string trio
- Poems from Antiquity (1998) for clarinet and string quartet

=== Vocal ===
- Songs from the Spirit of Turpentine (2019) for baritone and piano
- Songs from the Bleeding Pines (2016) for soprano and piano
- O Clavis David (2015) for soprano and SATB choir
- Still Life (2013) soprano and piano
- Four Ladino Folk Songs (2012) for SATB choir
- Our Long War (2011) for soprano, violin, and piano
- Ewigkeit (2011) for baritone and chamber ensemble
- From the Rubayaat of Omar Khayyam (2008) for mezzo-soprano and chamber ensemble
- Hannukah Cantata (2007) for SATB choir + soloists, cornetto, 3 sackbuts, organ, and baroque strings
- Four Hanukkah Songs (2007) for SATB choir and piano
- Kaddish (2006)
- The Choir (2004) for SATB choir
- Whitman Songs (2002) for baritone and piano
- The New Colussus (2002) for SATB choir
- Ave Maria (2000) for SSAA
- Things to Do in a Park (2000) for children's choir & string quartet

=== Solo ===
- All The Rage (2020) for solo violin
- Moto Perpetuo (2016) for solo violin
- Swan Song (2013) for violin and piano
- Five Ladino Songs (2012) for violin
- Lunaire Variations (2012) for piano
- Five Bagatelles (2011) for piano
- Sonata for Flute and Piano No. 2 "Canzoniere" (2010)
- Density 15.1 (2010) for solo tenor saxophone
- Scenes from Childhood (2009) for cello and piano
- Six Haikus (2008) for horn and piano
- Dante Microludes (2008) for cello
- Three Chansons (2007) for cello and piano
- Pleiades (2005) for oboe and piano
- Three Portraits of Isabella (2003) for solo piano
- Sonata No. 1 for Flute and Piano (2002)

=== Large ensemble ===
- The Anchoress (2018) for soprano, saxophone quartet, Renaissance winds, and percussion
- Missa Brevis (2008) for wind ensemble
