= Sonata per archi =

Italian string orchestra composition

String Sonata No. 1
- by Hans Werner Henze
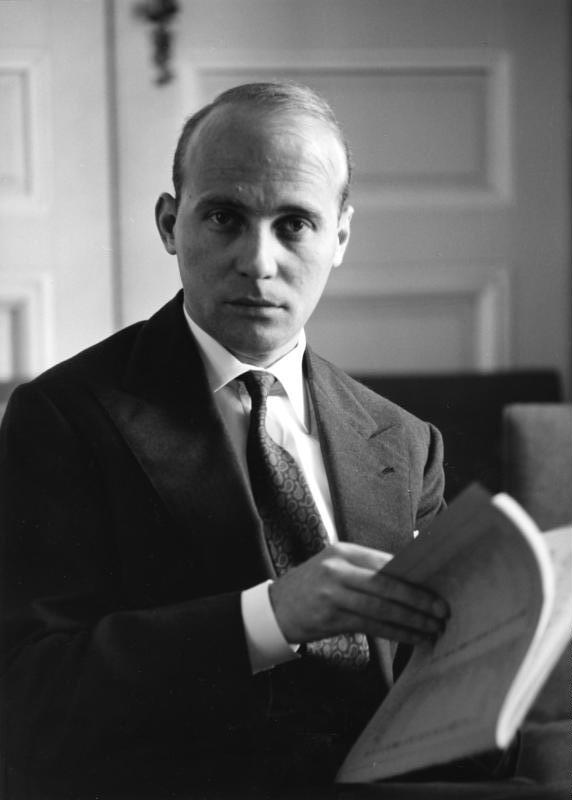
- Henze in 1960
- Native name: Sonata per archi
- Composed: 1957–58
- Performed: 21 March 1958: Zürich
- Movements: 2
- Scoring: String orchestra

The String Sonata No. 1, commonly referred to by its original Italian name Sonata per archi, is a composition for string orchestra by German composer Hans Werner Henze. It was composed between 1957 and 1958.

== Composition ==
The sonata was commissioned by Paul Sacher for his own orchestra, the Collegium Musicum Zürich, together with his Double Concerto for Oboe, Harp and Strings, and was written between 1957 and early 1958. According to Henze, it was influenced by an earlier idea of Heinz von Cramer, the librettist of Henze's König Hirsch, for a ballet about the Embarquement pour Cythère. It was premiered by Paul Sacher in Zürich on March 21, 1958. It was dedicated to Paul Sacher and his wife, Maya Sacher and was later published by B. Schotts' Sohne.

== Structure ==
The sonata is in two movements and has a total duration of 15 minutes. The movement list is as follows:

1. Allegro
2. 32 Variations
  - Thema. Mosso
  - Variation I. Adagio
  - Variation II. Più mosso
  - Variation III. Lo stesso tempo
  - Variation IV. Molto calmo
  - Variation V. Lo stesso tempo, con tenerezza
  - Variation VI. Assai mosso, con vigore
  - Variation VII. Meno mosso, leggiero
  - Variation VIII. Ancora meno
  - Variation IX. Con moto
  - Variation X. Più mosso
  - Variation XI. Molto più mosso, appassionato
  - Variation XII. Mesto
  - Variation XIII. Un poco più mosso
  - Variation XIV. Lo stesso tempo (estremamente piano)
  - Variation XV. Ancora calmo
  - Variation XVI. Con fuoco
  - Variation XVII. Veloce
  - Variation XVIII. Lo stesso tempo
  - Variation XIX. Lo stesso tempo
  - Variation XX. Ritardando
  - Variation XXI. Di nuovo assai mosso
  - Variation XXII. Di più
  - Variation XXIII. Leggiero
  - Variation XXIV. Meno mosso
  - Variation XXV. Furioso
  - Variation XXVI. Molto più lento
  - Variation XXVII. Molto meno mosso ancora
  - Variation XXVIII. Subito più mosso
  - Variation XXIX. Sostenuto
  - Variation XXX. Grave (Lamentandosi)
  - Variation XXXI. ♩. = 76
  - Variation XXXII. ♩ = 60

Its structure is nothing like a traditional sonata and displays the composer's distinctive serialist style. The first movement consists of a five-minute Stravinskian toccata, with plenty neo-classical features. It starts in E minor, but modulates in minor-third oscillations. The second movement is presumably influenced by Beethoven and consists of a set of attacca variations which are very difficult to distinguish by ear. It is scored for eight first violins, six second violins, four violas , four celli and two double basses.

== Notable recordings ==
- Paul Sacher conducted the Collegium Musicum Zürich in August 1967. The recording was released by Deutsche Grammophon both in LP and CD format.
