= Pas de Deux (Horner) =

Double concerto by James Horner

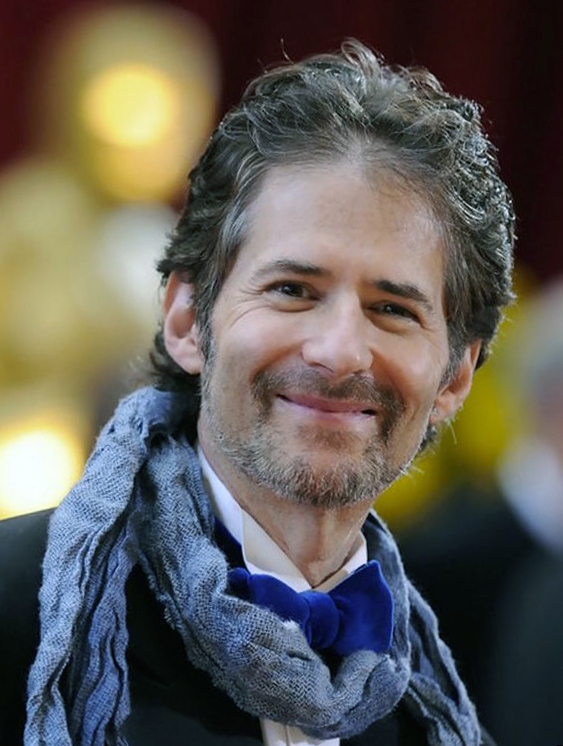
James Horner in 2010

Pas de Deux is a double concerto for violin, cello, and orchestra by the American composer James Horner. The work was commissioned by the Norwegian brother/sister musical duo of the violinist Mari Samuelsen and the cellist Håkon Samuelsen with contributions from the A. Wilhelmsen Foundation. It was composed from 2011 through 2014 and was premiered on November 13, 2014, with Mari and Håkon accompanied by the Royal Liverpool Philharmonic under the conductor Vasily Petrenko. Pas de Deux marked Horner's first major foray into classical music since the 1980s.

== Composition ==
Pas de Deux has a duration of roughly 30 minutes and is composed in three continuous movements. The style of the piece has been compared to the music of Gustav Holst and Ralph Vaughan Williams, but the music critics Tim Ashley and Glyn Môn Hughes have also noted similarities to the works of Henryk Górecki and Benjamin Britten.

== Reception ==
Critical response to the work has been mixed. Reviewing the premiere, Tim Ashley of The Guardian regarded the piece as "lushly scored" and "attractively played", but nevertheless opined that the work "outstayed its welcome". Richard Fairman of Financial Times similarly wrote, "The music laps back and forth languidly, washing over the somnolent listener. Almost nothing happens, as if some crucial visual element is missing." Glyn Môn Hughes of The Arts Desk further commented:

Pas de Deux required a big orchestra – two pianos, two harps and no fewer than seven horns. But did it work? It certainly had its attractions, mainly as a rhapsody reminiscent of Vaughan Williams, Holst or early Britten. Its opening was hypnotic, mesmerising almost, until a great crash moved the work into new, livelier territory. The soloists were intertwined with the orchestra and there were no showy cadenzas or passages of musical bravado. What the work failed to do was develop. There was precious little modulation and the same formulas were worked to death. Over a nearly half-hour span, that was hard going. But the audience loved it, many giving the piece a standing ovation. It looks like there’s every chance it could be programmed again, which is not something that always happens to every new piece which gets an airing.

However, the piece was more favorably reviewed by Christian Clemmensen of the website Filmtracks.com, who wrote, "The overall highlight of the concerto for Horner's enthusiasts will be the final five minutes, during which he kicks the piece into high gear for a percussively rhythmic extension of his more engaging music for films. Not surprisingly, this is where Horner's rambling chord shifts and percussive tapping dating from Sneakers to A Beautiful Mind are referenced, with the violin in a particularly powerful position to express the key shifts." He added, "Even for collectors of Horner's music, long parts of the concerto will languish in pensive understatement despite their lovely recording, and with the lack of definitive 'themes,' the lively third part may not be enough to save the whole for some. Those five minutes will merit a purchase of the whole for most listeners, however, the spirited send-off a fitting conclusive statement to Horner's career."

== Discography ==
The premiere performance of Pas de Deux was released on disk through Mercury Classics and Universal Music on May 25, 2015. The disk also features renditions of Arvo Pärt's Fratres, Giovanni Sollima's Violoncelles, Vibrez!, and Ludovico Einaudi's Divenire. It was the first classical album to top the Norwegian album charts since 1995.

== See also ==
- List of double concertos for violin and cello
