= Bella Hristova =

Bulgarian-American violinist

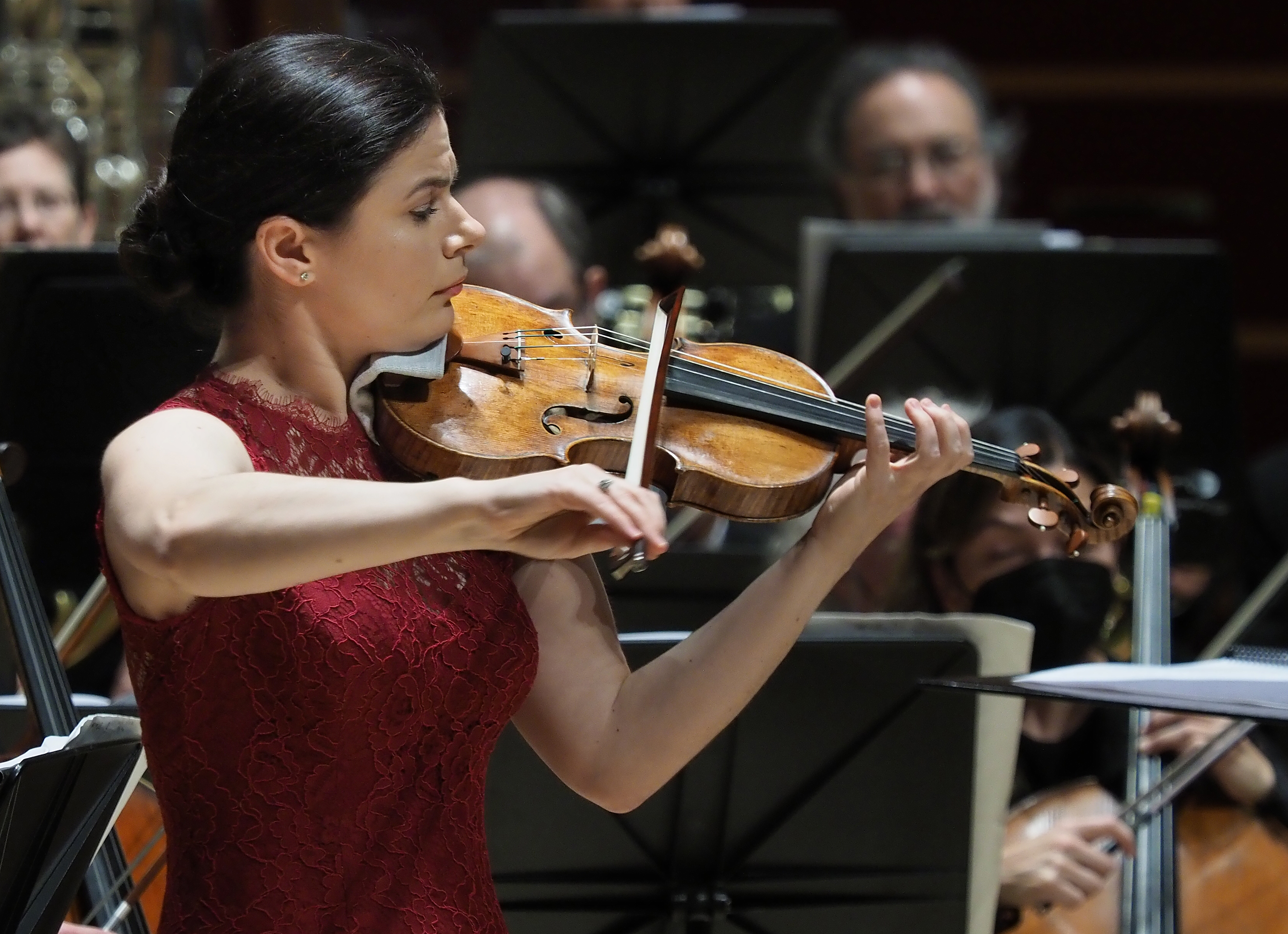
- Born: 28 December 1985 (age 40); Pleven, People's Republic of Bulgaria
- Education: Curtis Institute of Music; Jacobs School of Music
- Occupation: Violinist
- Spouse: David Ludwig
- Website: bellahristova.com

Bella Hristova (born December 28, 1985) is a Bulgarian-American violinist.

== Early life ==
Hristova was born in Pleven, Bulgaria to Russian and Bulgarian parents. She began her studies on the violin at the age of six. By the age of twelve, she enrolled in master classes with Ruggiero Ricci at the Mozarteum University Salzburg and later attended the Curtis Institute of Music in 2003. Here, she studied with Ida Kavafian and Steven Tenenbom. She received her Artists Diploma with Jaime Laredo at Jacobs School of Music at Indiana University Bloomington in 2010.

== Career ==
External audio
- You may hear Bella Hristova performing Ralph Vaughan Williams' The Lark Ascending with Barbara Schubert conducting the DuPage Symphony Orchestra in 2010 Here on archive.org

Hristova was a recipient of a 2013 Avery Fisher Career Grant, and a first prize winner of the 2009 Young Concert Artists International Auditions. Hristova has performed as a soloist with orchestras such as the Orchestra of St. Luke's at Lincoln Center, the New York String Orchestra under Jaime Laredo at Carnegie Hall, as well as with the Buffalo Philharmonic Orchestra, the Pasadena, Charleston, Asheville, Greenwich, Vermont, Kansas City, Delaware, Columbus, and Santa Rosa Symphonies, and the Orquesta Filarmónica de Boca del Río, Asturias Symphony Orchestra, Centro Nacional de la Música-la Orquesta, Estonian National Symphony Orchestra, National Arts Centre Orchestra, and Cheongju Symphony Orchestra. She plays a Nicolò Amati violin from 1655, which was once owned by the famed violinist Louis Krasner.

== Personal life ==
Hristova is married to composer David Serkin Ludwig.
