= Double Concerto (Harbison) =

Double concerto composed by John Harbison

The Double Concerto for Violin and Cello is a double concerto for violin, cello, and orchestra by the American composer John Harbison. The work was commissioned by the Friends of Dresden Music Foundation for the Boston Symphony Orchestra under the conductor James Levine. It was given its world premiere on April 8, 2010, by the spousal team of the violinist Mira Wang and the cellist Jan Vogler and the Boston Symphony Orchestra under the direction of Carlos Kalmar. The piece was composed in honor of the violinist Roman Totenberg.

== Composition ==
The Double Concerto has a duration of roughly 25 minutes and is composed in three numbered movements. Harbison described the character of each movement in the score program notes. Of the first movement, he wrote, "Slight 'misunderstandings,' known to music theorists as cross-relationships (unnecessarily pejorative in implication — they are often beautiful) are taken to a systemic level, perhaps standing for more telling misunderstandings. At issue is the interval of the third (is it major or minor?), an expressively determinant organism since music began." He described the second movement, writing, "Looking toward a closer accord, the soloists begin to mirror each other, revealing how differently things can look in mirrors of a certain design." Of the third movement, Harbison concluded, "The soloists aspire to simply play a theme together in octaves, something the orchestra achieves near the outset of this movement. Their eventual realization of this objective signals the conclusion."

=== Instrumentation ===
The work is scored for solo violin and cello and an orchestra comprising two flutes (2nd doubling piccolo), two oboes, two clarinets (2nd doubling bass clarinet), two bassoons (2nd doubling contrabassoon), four horns, two trumpets, timpani, one percussionists, celesta, harp, and strings.

== Reception ==
Jeremy Eichler of The Boston Globe called it "a polished and attractive addition to [Harbison's] catalog" and wrote:

Harbison is too seasoned a composer to lean on simplistic or reductive musical programs. He has his married soloists often “mishear’’ or misquote each other. In the third movement, he has them struggle to play a theme in octaves before ultimately succeeding. The piece offers opportunities for virtuoso display, in the rhapsodic outbursts of the opening movement and the catchy upbeat riffs of the finale, with enough interest to hold the ear. The orchestral support is spare but sensitive, and it all ends gracefully, with a colorful splash of percussion and a light parting shot from the soloists, dispensed “col legno,’’ or with the stick of the bow.

== See also ==
- List of double concertos for violin and cello
