= Leslie Edwards Jr. =

American aircraft technician and Tuskegee Airman (1924–2019)

Staff Sergeant Leslie Edwards Jr.
- Leslie Edwards Jr.
- Born: Leslie Edwards Jr. August 9, 1924; Memphis, Tennessee
- Died: September 23, 2019 (aged 95); Cincinnati, Ohio
- Burial place: Vine Street Hill Cemetery
- Spouse: Anna Mae (1943–2016)
- Relatives: 4 children
- Military career
- Branch: United States Army Air Force
- Service years: 1943–1945
- Rank: Staff Sergeant
- Unit: 477th Bomb Group
- Awards: Congressional Gold Medal
- Other work: Supervisor of Meat Inspectors for the Southwest Ohio

Leslie Edwards Jr. (August 9, 1924 – September 23, 2019) was trained as an aircraft technician and became a flight chief with the rank of staff sergeant and a member of the Tuskegee Airmen, the famed group of World War II-era African-American military pilots. In 2007 he was awarded the Congressional Gold Medal by President George W. Bush.

== Early life ==
The youngest of three children, he was born in Memphis, Tennessee on August 9, 1924. His family moved to Cincinnati, Ohio, the year after Edwards was born, settling in the West End. The family moved from the South to the North to avoid violence against blacks. Edwards' father, a bellhop, died when Edwards was five years old. Edwards had to leave the Harriet Beecher Stowe School in Cincinnati in the tenth grade to support his two sisters and mother.

== World War II service as a Tuskegee Airman ==
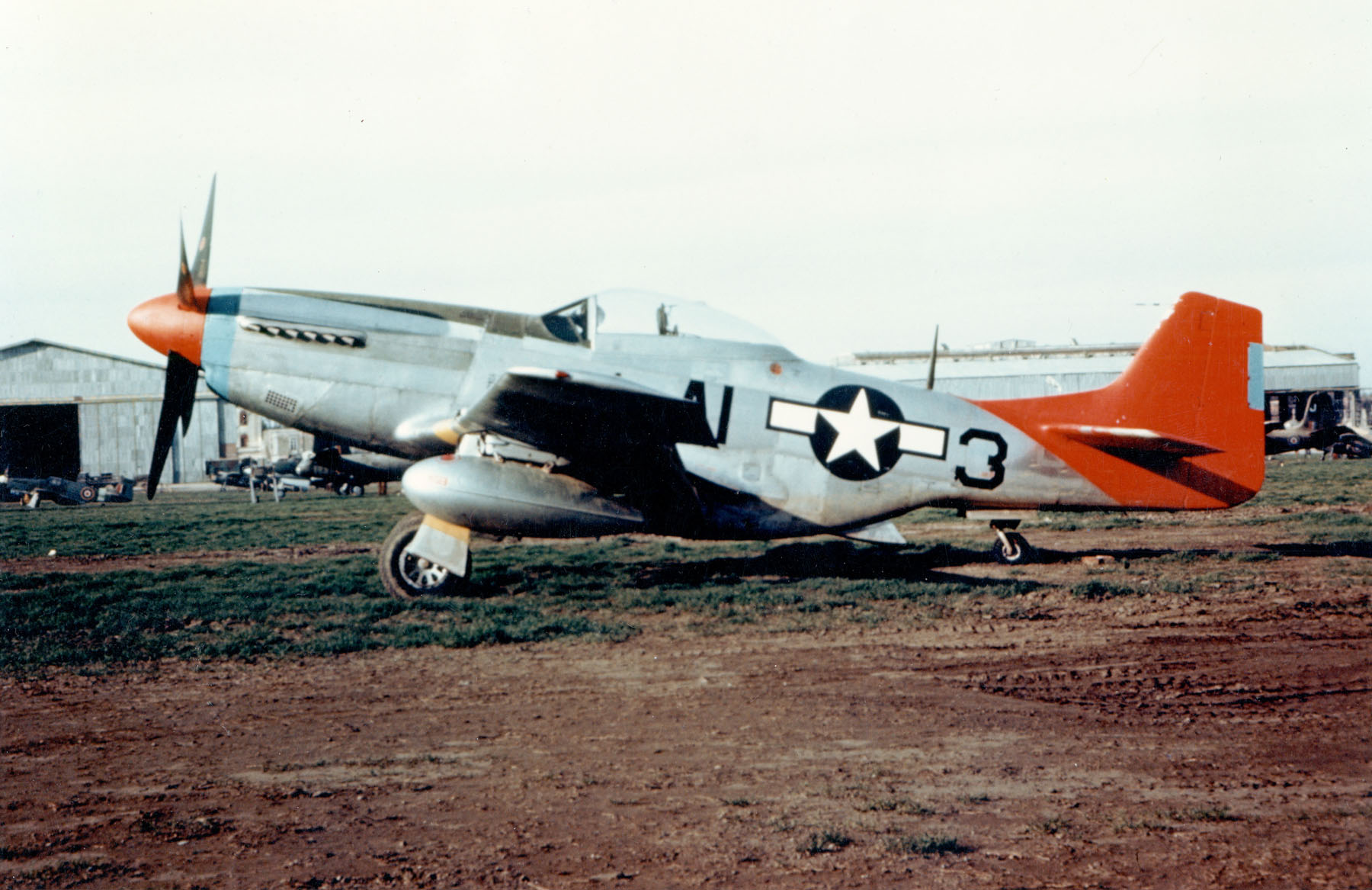
The Tuskegee Airmen's aircraft had distinctive markings that led to the name, "Red Tails." (Note: The red markings that distinguished the Tuskegee Airmen included red bands on the noses of P-51s as well as a red rudder; their P-51B and D Mustangs flew with similar color schemes, with red propeller spinners, yellow wing bands and all-red tail surfaces.)

Edwards was drafted in 1943. He was sent to Sheppard Field in Texas and was trained to work on the engines of bombers. Edwards was assigned to the 477th Bomb Group. The group was scheduled to participate in the War in the Pacific, but the war ended before they could be deployed. The 477th was sent to Godman Army Airfield in 1945. The 447th bomb group participated in the Freeman Field mutiny. Edwards are honorably discharged in 1946 with the rank of staff sergeant. Edwards never achieved the rank of master sergeant, a rank that in the 1940s was typically held only by white flight chiefs.

== Post-war life ==
After the end of his military service, Edwards worked at the Kahn's meatpacking plant in Camp Washington, Cincinnati, for two decades, and then worked for 25 years as a meat inspector. He and his wife, who had both dropped out of high school, returned to finish high school in 1961. He earned a bachelor's degree in commerce from Salmon P. Chase College in Cincinnati.

Edwards spoke about his wartime experiences to schoolchildren and other groups. He was honored with the Congressional Gold Medal in 2007, and attended the presidential inaugurations of Barack Obama in both 2009 and 2013.

== Death ==
Edwards died at the age of 95 at the Cincinnati VA Medical Center in Corryville, Cincinnati. On October 4, 2019, his funeral was held at First Unitarian Church in Avondale. He was survived by three daughters, one son and 19 grandchildren.

== Personal life ==
Edwards married Anna Mae in 1943 and they had four children. The couple stayed married 72 years, until the death of Anna Mae in 2016.

== See also ==
- Fly (2009 play about the 332d Fighter Group)
- Executive Order 9981
- Military history of African Americans
