= Double Concerto (Rorem) =

The Double Concerto is a composition for violin, cello, and orchestra by the American composer Ned Rorem. The work was commissioned by the Indianapolis Symphony Orchestra and composed between July 27, 1997, and April 1998. It was composed for the violinist Jaime Laredo and the cellist Sharon Robinson, who first performed the piece with the Indianapolis Symphony Orchestra conducted by Raymond Leppard in Indianapolis on October 15, 1998.

== Composition ==
=== Background ===
Rorem had known and worked with the cellist Sharon Robinson and the violinist Jaime Laredo for many years. In 1980, Rorem had composed his suite After Reading Shakespeare specifically for Sharon Robinson. Likewise, he had composed his 1984 Violin Concerto for Jaime Laredo. Thus, when Rorem received a commission from the Indianapolis Symphony Orchestra, he used the opportunity to write a double concerto for the two soloists. Rorem described his intent for the piece in the score program notes, writing:

Music being the least representational of the arts (it does not depict other than itself), the overall title is abstract: Double Concerto. Nevertheless, just to get the juices flowing, I did impose "concrete" titles onto the eight movements, which require 35 minutes to unfold. These titles connote whatever the listener chooses. I'll state only that in "Adam and Eve" the two soloists are literally born on stage: they emerge from the womb of the orchestra.

=== Structure ===
The work has a duration of roughly 35 minutes and is cast in eight movements:

1. Morning
2. Adam and Eve
3. Mazurka
4. Staying on Alone
5. Their Accord
6. Looking
7. Conversation at Midnight
8. Flight

=== Instrumentation ===
The work is scored for solo violin and cello and a small orchestra comprising two flutes, two oboes, two clarinets, two bassoons, two horns, two trumpets, and strings. In the score program notes, Rorem commented on the meek instrumentation, remarking, "The scoring is plain: only eight winds, four brass, and strings. No glamorous harps, keyboards, or mallets, and no percussion, none. (In growing older I've come to feel that percussion is, at best, mere decoration, at worst, immoral, like too many earrings or too many exclamation points!!)"

== Reception ==
Reviewing a recording of the work, Peter Dickinson of Gramophone wrote:

The Double Concerto seems to be full of chorales; the first section, "Morning", is in a harmonic idiom close to Messiaen. The Mazurka never feels Polish and breaks out into a hedonistic waltz; "Looking" alternates between the solo violin and the brass group; and "Conversation at Midnight", lasting nearly 15 minutes, is by far the longest movement. It is a series of luxuriant exchanges between the soloists and what starts as a kind of D major hymn in the strings, and it has its own central section with faster music. The last movement, "Flight", blows everything away in just over a minute. All beautifully played.

== Recording ==
A recording of the work, performed by Laredo, Robinson, and the IRIS Orchestra under the direction of Michael Stern, was released through Naxos Records in December 2006.

== See also ==
- List of double concertos for violin and cello
