= First Unitarian Church (Cincinnati, Ohio) =

- First Congregational-Unitarian Church
- U.S. National Register of Historic Places
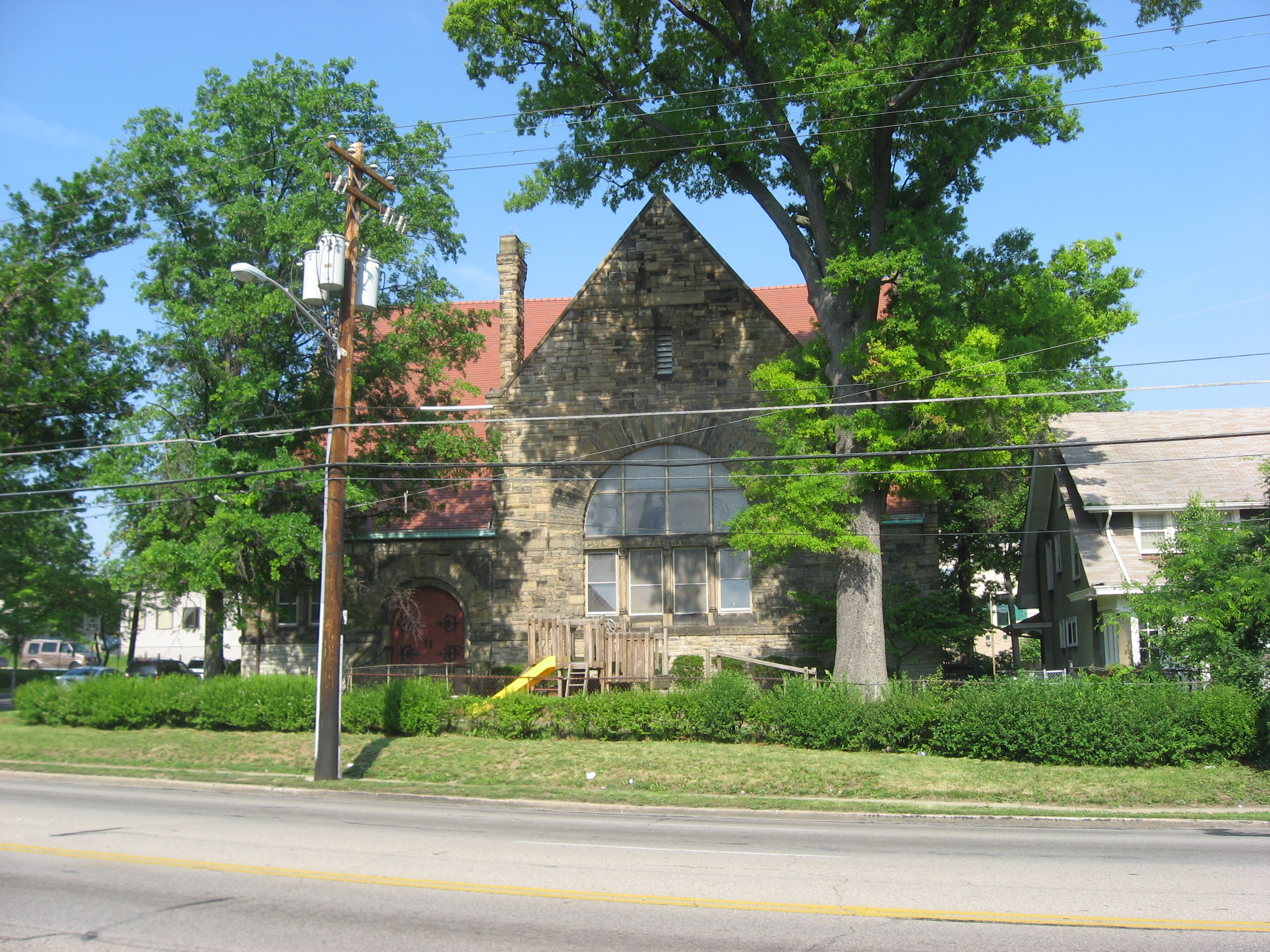
- Front of the church

- Location within Ohio Location within the United States
- Location: 2901 Reading Rd., Cincinnati, Ohio
- Coordinates: 39°7′55″N 84°29′53″W
- Area: Less than 1 acre (0.40 ha)
- Built: 1889
- Architect: James W. McLaughlin
- Architectural style: Richardsonian Romanesque
- NRHP reference No.: 76001434
- Added to NRHP: May 28, 1976

First Unitarian Church is a historic congregation of the Unitarian Universalist Association in Cincinnati, Ohio, United States. Founded in the early nineteenth century, it survived a series of division and reunifications in the nineteenth century. Among the people who have worshipped in its historic church building on the city's northern side are many members of the Taft family, including William Howard Taft, the President of the United States.

== History ==
In 1828, a Unitarian minister from Boston visited Cincinnati for approximately five weeks. Upon his return to New England, John Pierpont proclaimed to his compatriots the attractive features of Cincinnati, and within two years a Unitarian congregation was founded in the city. Located at the intersection of Fourth and Race Streets downtown, their first church building was dedicated on May 23, 1830; it was later replaced by a building at the nearby intersection of Eighth and Plum Streets. In its first year, the church was led by a succession of young ministers; although these early pastors were among the most prominent of the denomination's young ministers, many of these men typically left the pastorate at unusually young ages due to failing health. As a result, the congregation was frequently left without a preacher and forced to look to New England for new ministers. Among these men was William Henry Channing, who served the congregation from 1839 to 1844. Following Channing was the former lawyer James H. Perkins, who drowned in 1849; during his five years of ministry, he engaged the congregation in a range of social justice purposes, such as prison reforms and welfare for the poor. Controversy arose in the 1850s: questions of abolitionism were tense in a city located so close to the slave state of Kentucky, and theological differences over the existence of miracles caused the church to split into two. These tensions were resolved in the 1870s: both congregations had come to reject the existence of miracles, and the Thirteenth Amendment had ended slavery throughout the United States. Under the ministry of George Thayer, which began in 1882, the congregation was faced with widespread movement of members from downtown to the city's northern edges; as a result, the present building was erected along Reading Road, 2 miles (3.2 km) northeast of the former site.

== Architecture ==
In the late 1880s, the congregation arranged for the construction of a new church building along Reading Road. This new building was erected in 1889, with random blocks of ashlar being employed for the church's exterior. Architect James C. McLaughlin introduced many Richardsonian Romanesque elements into the church's design, such as rounded arch windows, structural elements that visually divide the structure into two parts, and random ashlar walls. Among the most distinctive elements of the building's design is the large rose window on its northern side; designed by Tiffany craftsman Frederick Wilson, it centers on a large image of a personification of Truth. McLaughlin employed primarily stone in the construction of the building: the foundation is built of sandstone, while the walls and some other elements are built of other types of stone.

For many years immediately prior to the construction of the new building, the congregation had been declining because many of its members moved away from its previous location; by relocating to a site in a growing neighborhood that was easily reached by public transportation, the leaders hoped to increase its accessibility. McLaughlin's design included such features as a tile roof, massive golden stained glass windows, and two fireplaces in the sanctuary. The sanctuary itself is a square measuring 56 feet (17 m) on each side; at the time of construction, it was capable of seating approximately three hundred worshippers. A large platform underneath the rose window served as the location for the organ and the hand-carven oak pulpit.

== Taft family ==
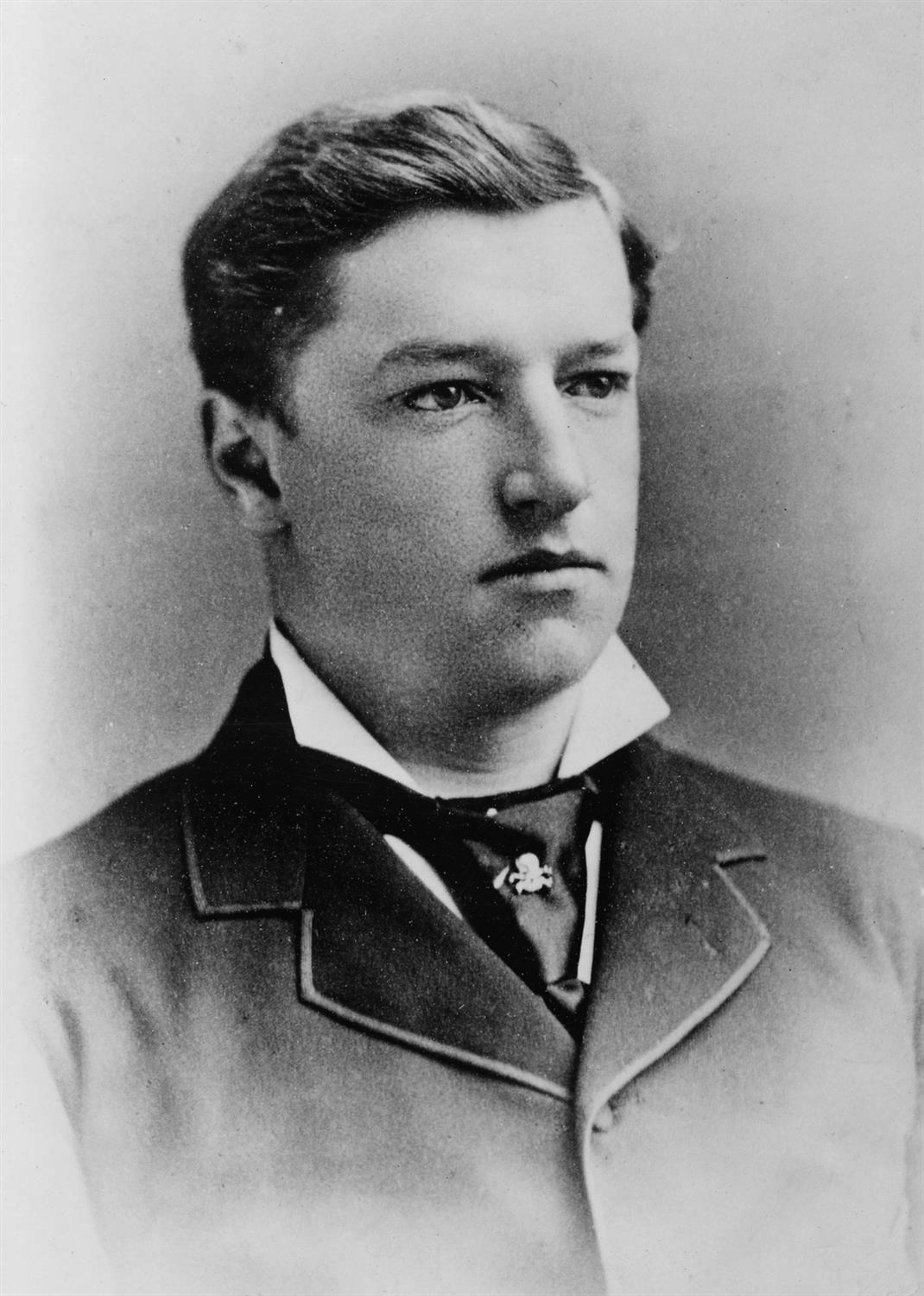
William Howard Taft in his youth

Among the leading members of First Unitarian Church were Alphonso and Louise Taft and their children. For many years, Alphonso served as one of the church's trustees, sitting as the chairman of the board of trustees for a period of time. He was often absent from the church in his later years, due to his many responsibilities as the United States Attorney General and Secretary of War. From his youth, Alphonso and Louise's son William Howard was an active member of the congregation, taking part in many youth activities; decades later, when he was running for president, the congregation's minister remembered his part as a fairy in a play organized by the congregation's Unity Club. Although his attendance also became less frequent as his governmental responsibilities increased, his influence in the congregation endured, as evidenced by the removal of the congregation's pacifistic minister in a popular wave sparked by Taft's public support for American involvement in World War I.

== Recent history ==
In 1976, First Unitarian Church's church building was listed on the National Register of Historic Places under the name of "First Unitarian-Congregational Church," qualifying because of its historically significant architecture. Starting two years later, many of the church's members united with musician Richard Waller to help form the Linton Chamber Music Series, a partnership with the Cincinnati Symphony Orchestra.

Today, the church is an active part of the Unitarian Universalist Association. Rev. Constance Simon became the minister in 2018.
