= Double Concerto (Henze) =

Double concerto by Hans Werner Henze

- by Hans Werner Henze
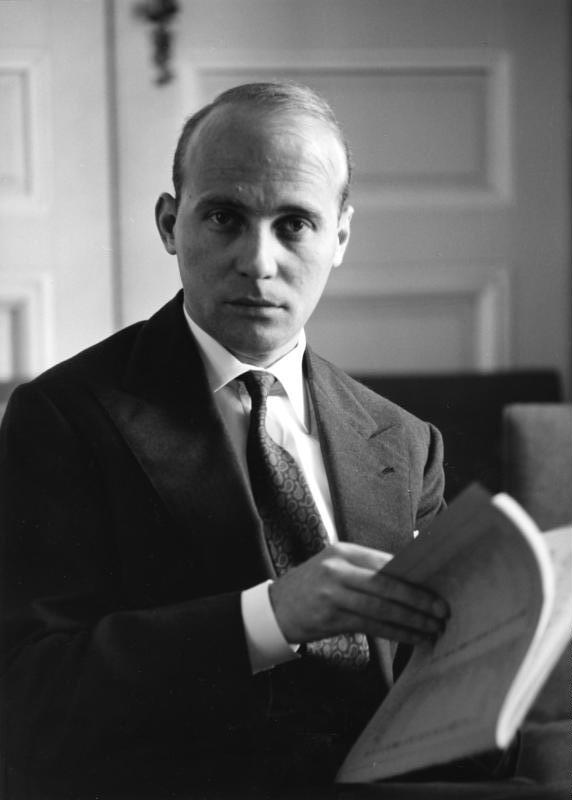
- The composer in 1960
- Native name: Doppio concerto
- Composed: 1966
- Performed: 2 December 1968: Zurich
- Published: Schott Music
- Movements: 1
- Scoring: oboe; harp; 18 string soloists

The Double Concerto by German composer Hans Werner Henze is a double concerto for oboe and harp, better known by its original Italian title Doppio concerto. It was completed and first performed in Zurich in 1966, and published by Schott.

== Composition ==
Henze's Double Concerto was commissioned by Paul Sacher and his Collegium Musicum Zürich and is dedicated to him and his wife, Maya Sacher, like Henze's Sonata per archi. It was written for oboist Heinz Holliger and his wife, harpist Ursula Holliger. It was finished in 1966 and was premiered on 2 December 1966 by the Holligers as the soloists and Sacher conducting his Collegium Musicum Zürich. It was eventually published by Schott Music.

== Structure ==
The concerto is in one movement which has a total duration of approximately thirty minutes. It is divided in a ternary ABA_{1} structure, with an additional coda based in B, which recalls the structure of Bartók's third quartet. In recordings, the tracks are usually divided according to this structure:

- Section A starts at bar 1, marked ♩ = c. 112, with the oboe presenting the theme to be further developed in the section.
- Section B starts at bar 252, marked Andante, with a slower and darker tone, and ends with a cadenza performed by the harp.
- Section A_{1} starts at bar 386, after the cadenza is finished, and the main theme is quoted several times during this section. It is marked ♩ = 80 and features a short cadenza by the oboe.
- The coda starts at bar 558, marked Andante, and is the shortest section in the concerto. The tone is, again, dark and rhythmically simpler.

Since this is a concertante piece, it features many technical challenges, such as double harmonics, flutter-tonguings, microtone glissandi and the so-called circular breathing, a technique which was fairly recent at the time. For Henze, it is important to have a decorative contrast in instrumentation such as the harp, since "the distinctive oboe timbre can exhaust the listener if overdone". The concerto is scored for the two soloists, oboe and harp, and a string section consisting of 18 soloists, eight violins, four violas, four cellos and two double basses.

== Recordings ==
- Both the commissioners and the original soloists recorded the piece in July 1968. The recording was released by Deutsche Grammophon.
- Hans Werner Henze conducted the Royal Concertgebouw Orchestra and recorded the piece with soloists Heinz and Ursula Holliger on October 27, 1968.
