= Jennifer Koh =

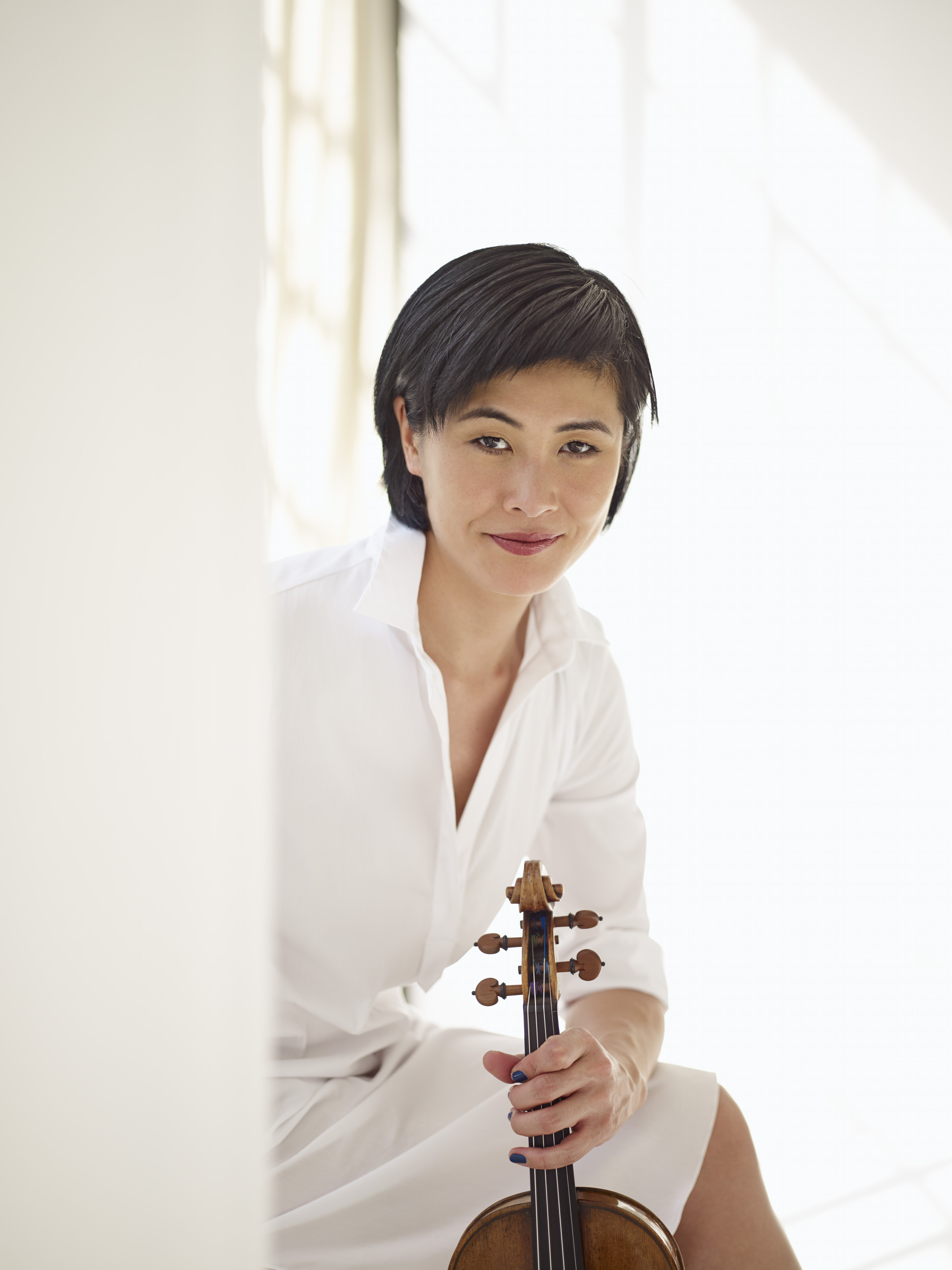

Background information
- Born: 1976 (age 49–50); Glen Ellyn, Illinois, U.S.
- Genre: Classical
- Instrument: Violin
- Website: jenniferkoh.com

Jennifer Koh (born 1976) is an American violinist.

== Life and career ==
Koh was born in Chicago to Korean parents. She graduated from Benet Academy and earned a B.A. in English Literature from Oberlin College, as well as a Performance Diploma from the attached Oberlin Conservatory. She is also a graduate of the Curtis Institute and was the top medalist in the 1994 Tchaikovsky Competition. That year she also won a scholarship from the Concert Artists Guild. She received an Avery Fisher Career Grant in 1995.

Koh has performed extensively with such orchestras as the Los Angeles Philharmonic, New York Philharmonic, Czech Philharmonic, BBC National Orchestra of Wales, Baltimore Symphony Orchestra, Saint Louis Symphony, and Cleveland Orchestra and is an advocate of music education for children.

She is lauded for her programs of Bach. She performed and recorded a series "Bach and Beyond" which has received high critical praise. She premieres and records contemporary music of composers including Kaija Saariaho, John Zorn, and Esa-Pekka Salonen.

In 2012, Koh was a featured performer in the revival of the Philip Glass/Robert Wilson opera Einstein on the Beach, portraying the role of Einstein.

One of Koh's most memorable projects, Alone Together, granted her a new level of visibility during the COVID-19 pandemic. Created in response to the global crisis, this project brought attention to the financial hardship experienced by so many in the arts community. The New York Times described Alone Together as "a marvel for a time of crisis" and "more inclusive than anything in mainstream classical music."

In February 2022, the National Symphony Orchestra commissioned Missy Mazzoli's Violin Concerto (Procession), performed by Koh at the John F. Kennedy Center for the Performing Arts Concert Hall.

In April 2022, Koh collaborated with American operatic bass-baritone Davóne Tines to curate Everything Rises, a multimedia production featuring music, projections and actual interview recordings telling the story their individual family histories. Koh and Tines saw in each other an ally struggling with the same issue of being an artist of color in a culture dominated by whiteness. This project was developed over multiple years by an all-BIPOC creative team and received its world premiere at UC Santa Barbara Arts and Lectures. Koh's mother Gertrude Soonja Lee shared stories of the Korean War and immigration to the U.S. while Tines' grandmother Alma Lee Gibbs Tines dove into memories of anti-Black discrimination and violence. Koh and Tines aimed to create a united front through music, heavily inspired by the recent uproar of activism and solidarity across all racial identities in 2022.

On December 8, 2022, Koh was appointed Artistic Director of the Fortas Chamber Music Concerts at the John F. Kennedy Center for the Performing Arts in Washington, D.C., replacing Joseph Kalichstein, who died in March 2022.

Koh continued showcasing highlights from her collaborations with composer Missy Mazzoli on March 13, 2024, during her premiere with NPR Music's Tiny Desk Concerts. Tom Huizenga for NPR commented that, "In all its rugged delight," the performance was a "fruitful, collaborative friendship between composer and performer that has yielded amazing music."

== Discography ==
Year	Recording Details	Label			
2021	Bach & Beyond Part III: Jennifer Koh, violin	Cedille Records	2021	Alone Together: Jennifer Koh, violin; Various Artists, accompaniment	Cedille Records
2018	Saariaho X Koh: Jennifer Koh, violin; Kaija Saariaho, composer; Curtis 20/21 Ensemble; Conner Grey Covington, conductor	Cedille Records			
2016	Tchaikovsky: Complete Works for Violin and Orchestra: Jennifer Koh, violin; Alexander Vedernikov, conductor; Odense Symphony Orchestra	Cedille Records			
2015	Bach & Beyond Part II: Jennifer Koh, violin	Cedille Records			
2014	Two X Four: Jennifer Koh, violin; Jaime Laredo, violin; Curtis 20/21 Ensemble; Vinay Parameswaran, conductor	Cedille Records			
2013	"Signs, Games and Messages": Jennifer Koh, violin; Shai Wosner, piano	Cedille Records			
2012	"Bach and Beyond I": Jennifer Koh, violin	Cedille Records			
2009	"Rhapsodic Musings": Jennifer Koh, violin	Cedille Records			
2006	Schumann: The Sonatas for Violin and Piano: Jennifer Koh, violin; Reiko Uchida, piano	Cedille Records			
2006	Jennifer Koh: Portraits: Jennifer Koh, violin; Grant Park Orchestra; Carlos Kalmar, conductor	Cedille Records			
2002	Menotti: Jennifer Koh, violin; Spoleto Festival Orchestra; Richard Hickox, conductor	Chandos Records			
2000	"String Poetic" (Grammy Nomination for Best Chamber Music Performance): Jennifer Koh, violin; Reiko Uchida, piano	Cedille Records			
2000	Jennifer Koh: Violin Fantasies: Jennifer Koh, violin; Reiko Uchida, piano	Cedille Records			
2000	Jennifer Koh: Solo Chaconnes: Jenniver Koh, violin	Cedille Records			
1997	Klami - Whirls, Act 1: Jennifer Koh, violin; Lahti Symphony Orchestra, Osmo Vänskä, conductor	BIS Records			

== Personal life ==
In 2026 Koh shared her diagnosis of Parsonage–Turner syndrome through an article in the New York Times.
