= Cho-liang Lin =

Taiwanese violinist (born 1960)

Cho-Liang Lin 林昭亮
- Born: January 29, 1960 (age 66); Hsinchu, Taiwan
- Instrument: Violin
- Website: www.cholianglin.com

Cho-Liang Lin (Lin Cho-liang, Chinese: 林昭亮, born January 29, 1960) is a Taiwanese-American violinist who is renowned for his appearances as a soloist with major orchestras. Musical America named him its "Instrumentalist of the Year" in 2000. He founded the Taipei International Music Festival in 1997, the largest classical music festival in the history of Taiwan, performing to an indoor audience of over 53,000 and the Taipei Music Academy & Festival in 2019, a summer music festival.

== Career ==
Lin's career as a violinist has spanned the globe for more than four decades. Lin was born in 1960 to a Hakka family in Hsinchu, then a quiet college town 70 km (43 mi) south of Taipei, a research center where his father worked as a nuclear physicist. He began playing violin at the age of five. Recognizing that he needed to pursue his violin studies abroad, he made his way to Australia by himself when he was only 12 years old; he spent three years in Sydney. His commanding technique and precocious abilities then led him to Juilliard School, where he studied with the eminent Dorothy DeLay, teacher to several renowned soloists such as Itzhak Perlman, Gil Shaham, Midori Goto, et al. He made his public debut in New York City at the age of 19, playing Mozart's Violin Concerto No. 3 at Avery Fisher Hall.

Since his début at Lincoln Center's Mostly Mozart Festival at the age of nineteen, he has appeared with virtually every major orchestra in the world, including the Boston Symphony Orchestra, Cleveland Orchestra, Royal Concertgebouw Orchestra, London Symphony Orchestra, Philadelphia Orchestra and New York Philharmonic. He has over twenty recordings to his credit, ranging from the concertos of Mozart, Mendelssohn, Bruch, Sibelius, and Prokofiev, to Christopher Rouse and Tan Dun, as well as the chamber music of Schubert, Brahms, Tchaikovsky and Ravel. His recording partners include Yefim Bronfman, Yo-Yo Ma, Wynton Marsalis, Esa-Pekka Salonen, Leonard Slatkin, Michael Tilson Thomas, Isaac Stern and Helen Huang. His recordings have been critically acclaimed, winning several Grammy nominations and The Gramophone's Record of the Year award. He has been a member of the Juilliard School faculty since 1991 and the Shepherd School of Music at Rice University since 2006. Lin served as the music director of La Jolla SummerFest in California from 2001 to 2018, and as the music director for Hong Kong International Chamber Music Festival since 2011.

An avid chamber musician, Lin appears at the Beijing Music Festival, as well as his perennial appearances performing at the Chamber Music Society of Lincoln Center, the Aspen Music Festival, and Santa Fe Chamber Music Festival. He is also featured in the film 4 as the principal violin of the Vivaldi's Autumn in one of the Four Quartets of the Four Seasons.

He plays the 1715 "Titian" Stradivarius.

In 2023, he stepped down as the artistic director of the Taipei Music Academy and Festival following accusations by two women of sexual harassment.
