= Ursula Holliger =

Swiss harpist

Ursula Holliger, née Hänggi, (8 June 1937 – 21 January 2014) was a Swiss harpist, known for her commitment to contemporary music.

== Career ==
Born in Basel, Holliger studied at the Basel Academy and then at the Conservatoire de Bruxelles. She subsequently went on to pursue a solo career, alone or with her husband, oboist, conductor and composer, Heinz Holliger.

She was one of the most important harpists, particularly in the field of contemporary music, where she played and created many works dedicated to her or her husband: Elliott Carter (Trilogy, 1992; Mosaic, 2004), Alberto Ginastera (Concerto), Henze's Double concerto, 1966), André Jolivet (Controversia, 1969), Witold Lutosławski's Double Concerto, 1980), Ernst Křenek (Kitharaulos, 1972), Frank Martin's Petite symphonie concertante, 1945), Alfred Schnittke (Concerto for oboe and harp, 1970 Eucalypts I, 1970), Isang Yun (Double concerto for oboe and harp, Gong-Hu, In balance, 1987), Tōru Takemitsu (Concerto for oboe and harp) and Heinz Holliger (Mobile, 1962; Trio, 1966; Praeludium I et II 1987).

She performed under the direction of Michael Gielen, Pierre Boulez, Simon Rattle, André Previn, Neville Marriner, and Heinz, among others. She played with flutists Peter-Lukas Graf and Aurèle Nicolet in Classical repertoire such as Mozart's concerto or Spohr's works. She also performed in duets with harpist Catherine Einsenhoffer and with violinist Hanna Weinmaster. She taught at the Hochschule für Musik Freiburg and in Basel.

== Discography ==
Ursula Holliger has recorded for Accord, Camerata, Philips, Deutsche Grammophon/Archiv, Claves Records, Néos et Novalis.

- Haendel's Concerto for harp in B-flat major, HWV 294 - I Musici (October 1970, Philips 462 179-2) OCLC 39357144
- Lutosławski's Concerto for oboe and harp (Philips) OCLC 43704602
- Saudades: Ginastera's Concerto for harp - Kammerorchester Serenata Basel, dir. Johannes Schlaefli (September 1992, Pan Classics) OCLC 33476637
- Chefs-d'œuvre français pour harpe: André Caplet; Claude Debussy; Maurice Ravel; - Ursula Holliger, harp; Peter-Lukas Graf, flute; Serge Collot, viola; Hans Rudolf Stalder, clarinette; Kammermusiker Zurich (Claves) OCLC 223642543
- Recital for two harps: Franck; Debussy; Fauré; Schumann (29-30 April and 26-27 June 1995, Claves) OCLC 37788588
- Inner song: chamber music: Elliott Carter (Trilogy) (1997, Philips) OCLC 312666160
