= Helen Huang =

American classical pianist

Helen Huang 黃海倫
- Born: October 1982 (age 43); Ibaraki, Japan
- Citizenship: United States
- Occupation: Classical pianist
- Years active: 1990–present

Helen Huang (Chinese: 黃海倫; pinyin: Huáng Hǎilún; born October 1982) is an American classical pianist. She began studying piano in 1987, performing and touring with major symphony orchestras.

== Musical career ==
Huang was born in Ibaraki, Japan, to Taiwanese parents. Her family moved to the United States in 1985 and Huang began her piano study in 1987. She attended the Manhattan School of Music, and then the Juilliard School, where she studied with the Israeli pianist Yoheved Kaplinsky, graduating in 2004.

Huang debuted with a major symphony orchestra at age 8, when she performed with the Philadelphia Orchestra. She performed in December 1992 with the New York Philharmonic under the direction of Kurt Masur, with whom she maintained a close association.

Huang has performed with several major orchestras, including the Cleveland Orchestra, the U.S. National Symphony Orchestra, the New York Philharmonic, the Philadelphia Orchestra, the Saint Louis Symphony, the Leipzig Gewandhaus Orchestra and the London Philharmonic. She has toured with the New York Philharmonic (in 1998 and again in 1999), the Pittsburgh Symphony (1998–99) and the Vienna Chamber Orchestra.

She has been a member of the Juilliard School faculty since 2008.

== Awards ==
Huang is the recipient of numerous awards including the Manhattan School of Music concerto competition (1992); the Martin E. Segal Award (1994); and the Avery Fisher Career Grant (1995).

== Discography ==
Introducing Helen Huang (1995)

- Beethoven, Piano Concerto No. 1 in C major, Op. 15
- Mozart, Piano Concerto No. 23 in A major, K. 488

Helen Huang: For Children (1996)

- Villa-Lobos, A Prole do bebê (8), suite for piano, Book 1 ("A família do bebê"), A. 140
- Debussy, Children's Corner, suite for piano (or orchestra), L. 113
- Mozart, Variations on "Ah vous dirai-je, Maman", for piano in C major, K. 265 (K. 300e)
- Mendelssohn, Songs without Words for piano No. 34 in C major ("Spinnerlied"), Op. 67/4
- Schumann, Kinderszenen (Scenes from Childhood) for piano, Op. 15
- Liszt, Gnomenreigen, for piano (Zwei Konzertetüden No. 2), S. 145/2 (LW A218/2)

Helen Huang (1998)

- Mozart, Piano Concerto No. 21 in C major ("Elvira Madigan") K. 467
- Mendelssohn, Piano Concerto No. 1 in G minor, Op. 25
- Mendelssohn, Capriccio brillant for piano and orchestra in B minor, Op. 22

Georg Tintner: Violin Sonata; Works for Piano (with Cho-Liang Lin, violin) (2007)

- Tintner, Sonata for violin & piano
- Tintner, Variations on a Theme of Chopin, for piano
- Tintner, Sehnsucht (Longing), prelude for piano
- Tintner, Auf den Tod eines Freundes (On the death of a Friend), for piano
- Tintner, Piano Sonata in F minor
- Tintner, Fugue for piano in G major (Allegro)
- Tintner, Fugue for piano in C minor (Bewegt)
- Tintner, Trauermusik (Musica Tragica), for piano
