= Double Concerto (Delius) =

Double concerto by Frederick Delius

The Double Concerto for Violin, Cello, and Orchestra by Frederick Delius is a double concerto for violin, cello, and orchestra in C minor, composed between April and June 1915 while Delius lived in Watford, England. The work is dedicated to the sister duo of violinist May Harrison and cellist Beatrice Harrison, who premiered the piece under conductor Henry Wood on February 21, 1920 in Queen's Hall, London.

== Background ==
Delius was inspired to compose the Double Concerto after attending a December 1914 performance of the Hallé Orchestra under conductor Thomas Beecham in Manchester. The concert featured Johannes Brahms's Double Concerto in A minor performed by sisters May and Beatrice Harrison, to whom Delius was introduced after the concert by music critic Samuel Langford. Though his opinion of Brahms's Double Concerto was never recorded, Delius agreed to write a concerto for the Harrison sisters and began work on the composition by April 1915, frequently consulting the sisters during its creation.

The piece was completed in June 1915 during a relatively dry creative period for Delius (the only other composition he'd finished in a year's time was Air and Dance for string orchestra). After its completion, Delius, in ailing health, and his wife Jelka returned to Grez-sur-Loing, France. Delius later described any time spent away from his work in Watford as "an unpleasant dream."

== Composition ==
A performance of the Double Concerto lasts approximately twenty minutes and, similar to his subsequent violin and cello concertos, the work is composed in one continuous movement.

=== Instrumentation ===
The work is scored for solo violin and cello accompanied by an orchestra comprising two flutes, oboe, two clarinets, English horn, two bassoons, four French horns, two trumpets, three trombones, tuba, timpani, harp, and strings.

== Reception ==
Andrew Clements of The Guardian wrote of the Double Concerto, along with Delius's violin and cello concertos, saying, "...they all sound as if they were carved out of the same creative block, in which conventional concerto dialogues are replaced by less confrontational rhapsodising with soloists, and orchestra combining to unfold Delius's long-limbed melodies." Anthony Burton of BBC Music Magazine similarly opined, "Unusually for [Delius], they have no acknowledged starting point in narrative or landscape: their lyrical flow seems to stem rather from the very nature of the solo instruments. But all three round off their coherent single-movement forms with codas suffused by Delius’s characteristic sunset glow of nostalgia." Music critic Michael Cookson said of the piece, "The double concerto displays much of the composer’s individuality, comprising many differing melodic ideas presented in a rather agitated manner, yet the work has an appealing robustness and remains one of my favourite Delius works."

== See also ==
- List of compositions by Frederick Delius
- List of double concertos for violin and cello
