= Joseph Kalichstein =

American classical pianist (1946–2022)

Kalichstein in 1971

Joseph Kalichstein (Hebrew: יוסף קאליכשטיין; 15 January 1946 – 31 March 2022) was an American classical pianist who performed in the concerto, solo recital and chamber music repertoire, the latter mainly with Jaime Laredo and Sharon Robinson in the Kalichstein-Laredo-Robinson Trio. He was also a professor at the Juilliard School in New York.

== Biography ==
Joseph Kalichstein was born in Tel Aviv, Mandatory Palestine, in 1946. He studied piano with Joshua Shor in his native land. His talent came to the attention of the great Chilean pianist Claudio Arrau, who arranged for Kalichstein to train at the Juilliard School in New York in 1962. There, he studied under Edward Steuermann and Ilona Kabos. He won the Young Concert Artists' Award in 1967, and in 1968 he appeared with the New York Philharmonic under Leonard Bernstein, playing Beethoven's Piano Concerto No. 4, a concert that was nationally televised. In 1969 he gained his master's degree from Juilliard, and that same year won the Leventritt Competition (the unanimous jury included George Szell, Rudolf Serkin, and William Steinberg). The Leventritt prize included performances with leading orchestras around the US; this included two concerts conducted by Szell, one with the Cleveland Orchestra and one with the New York Philharmonic. Kalichstein also appeared with the London Symphony Orchestra under André Previn in 1970, giving his first performance of Beethoven's Piano Concerto No. 5.

He later collaborated with conductors such as Daniel Barenboim, Pierre Boulez, Christoph von Dohnányi, Zubin Mehta, Erich Leinsdorf, Leonard Slatkin and many others, with many of the world's greatest orchestras. In 1977 he performed with violinist Jaime Laredo and cellist Sharon Robinson at the inauguration of U.S. President Jimmy Carter. They continued to play together, and in 1981 formally established themselves as the Kalichstein-Laredo-Robinson Trio. The Trio was still touring in 2012, and has recorded most of the classic piano trio literature including the complete trios of Beethoven, Franz Schubert, and Johannes Brahms, the complete chamber music for their instruments by Maurice Ravel, and also a number of new works written for them by such composers as Richard Danielpour, John Corigliano, and Daron Hagen.

Kalichstein became a member of the Juilliard School faculty in 1983. In 1997, he was appointed Artistic Advisor for Chamber Music and Artistic Director of the Fortas Chamber Music Concerts, by the John F. Kennedy Center for the Performing Arts. In 2003 he was appointed to Juilliard's newly established Edwin S. and Nancy A. Marks Chair in Chamber Music Studies.

He made many recordings, and regularly performed internationally. Kalichstein died on 31 March 2022, aged 76.

== Notable students ==
- Ran Dank
- Tiffany Poon
- Di Wu
- Liza Stephenova
- Rachel Kudo
- Shijun Wang
