= Double Concerto (Abrahamsen) =

The Double Concerto for Violin, Piano, and Strings is a composition by the Danish composer Hans Abrahamsen. The work was commissioned by the Royal Danish Orchestra and the Swedish Chamber Orchestra and was composed between 2010 and 2011.

Its world premiere was given by the sister duo of the violinist Baiba Skride and the pianist Lauma Skride with the Royal Danish Orchestra under the direction of André de Ridder in Copenhagen on October 9, 2011. The piece is dedicated to Baiba and Lauma Skride, Wiebke Busch, and André de Ridder.

== Music ==
The concerto has a duration of roughly 22 minutes and is composed in four movements:

1. Sehr langsahm und ausdrucksvoll
2. Schnell und unruhig
3. Langsam und melancholisch
4. Lebhaft und zittern

It is scored for an ensemble consisting of violin, piano, and strings (violins I & II, violas, violoncellos, and double basses).

== Reception ==
The Double Concerto has been praised by music critics. Andrew Clements of The Guardian described the piece as "equally parsimonious with its material, sometimes reducing it to a single line or simple gestures." Despite this light criticism, he nevertheless added, "But in its quietly beautiful, introspective way it touches on a whole range of musical worlds, from late Brahms to Arvo Pärt." Also writing for The Guardian, the music critic Kate Molleson remarked, "Abrahamsen's recent language is less urgently polemical, more suggestive, and here he uses the orchestra to paint wide, subtle landscapes on to which the soloists place delicate but definite sound objects. The piece spirits away – a classic Abrahamsen move leaving us in lingering mystery." In an article for The Herald, Molleson further wrote:

It would be foolish [...] to mistake the succinctness and natural, almost naive imagery in Abrahamsen's music for any lack of technical sophistication. Take the Double Concerto: on the surface it sounds simple, organic and clean, but its construction is glitteringly intricate. Tonality mingles with atonality; conventional tuning slips into just intonation; two tempos coexist and tropes from as far back as Bach filter into the mix. This isn't simplicity at all, but it is all part of that calm synthesis I mentioned earlier. Terms like 'magical', 'mysterious' and 'elusive' are often used describe Abrahamsen's music, and for good reason. Like a fairytale or a winter landscape, he takes what is familiar and transforms it, allowing us to experience it, and perhaps ourselves, afresh.
