= Double Concerto (Carter) =

Double concerto for harpsichord and piano composed by Elliott Carter

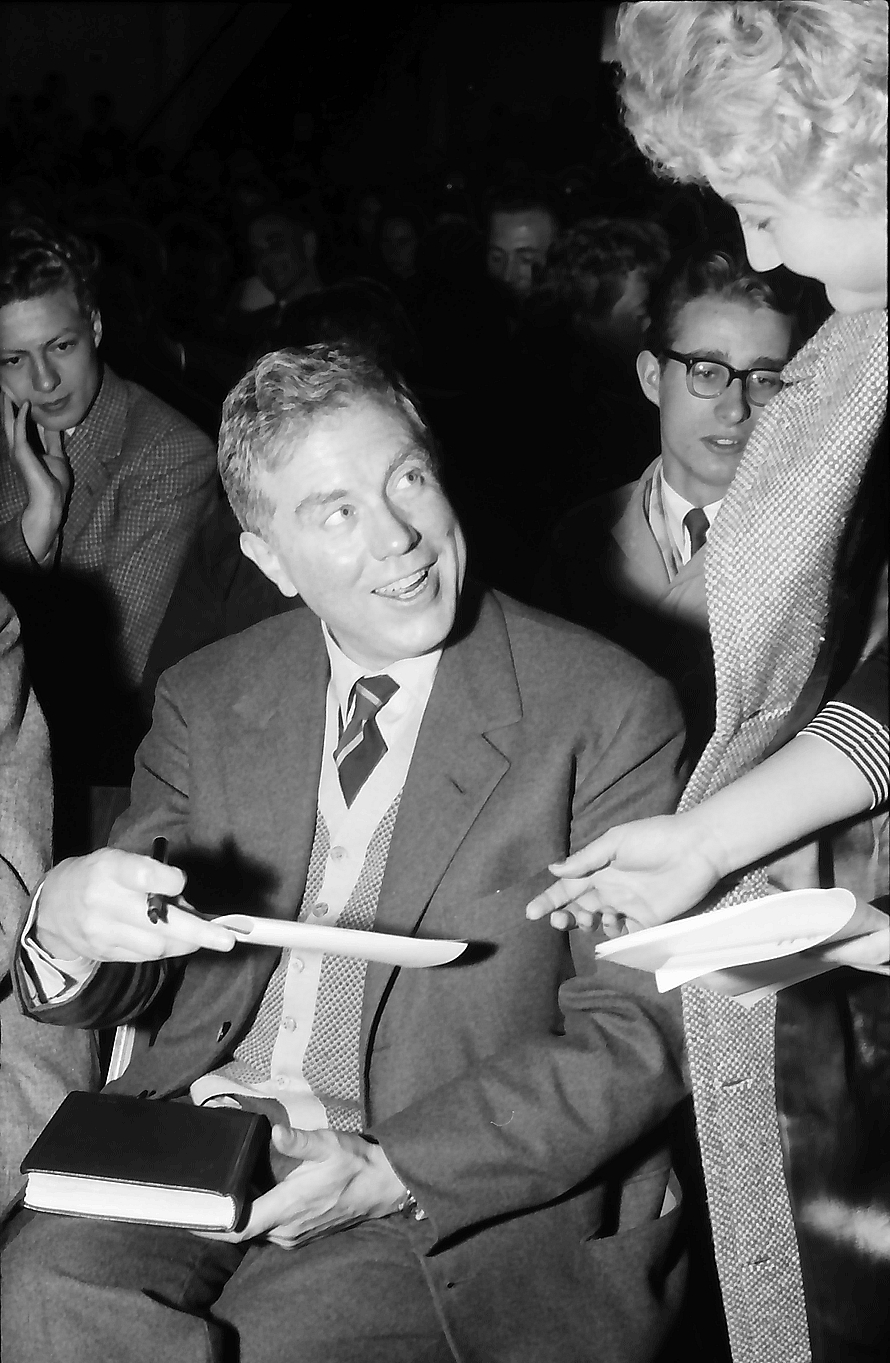
Elliott Carter at the Donaueschingen Festival in 1957

The Double Concerto for Harpsichord and Piano with Two Chamber Orchestras is a composition by the American composer Elliott Carter. The work was commissioned by the Fromm Music Foundation and is dedicated to the philanthropist Paul Fromm. It was completed in August 1961 and was first performed at the Metropolitan Museum of Art's Grace Rainey Rogers Auditorium on September 6, 1961. The premiere was performed by the harpsichordist Ralph Kirkpatrick and the pianist Charles Rosen under the conductor Gustav Meier.

== Composition ==
The Double Concerto has a duration of roughly 23 minutes and is composed in seven connected movements:

1. Introduction
2. Cadenza for Harpsichord
3. Allegro Scherzando
4. Adagio
5. Presto
6. Cadenza for Piano
7. Coda

=== Instrumentation ===
To perform the work a chamber orchestra is divided into two ensembles led by the soloists. The first orchestra is led by the harpsichord and comprises a flute (doubling piccolo), horn, trombone (doubling bass trombone), two percussionists, viola, and double bass. The second orchestra is led by the piano and comprises an oboe, clarinet (doubling E♭ clarinet), bassoon, horn, two percussionists, violin, and cello.

== Reception ==
The Double Concerto has been highly praised by critics and musicians alike. Reviewing a 1994 performance of the work by the Los Angeles Philharmonic, Martin Bernheimer of the Los Angeles Times remarked:

The Double Concerto for harpsichord, piano and two chamber orchestras, written in 1961, still makes a mighty noise in many, marvelous ways. The keyboard sounds are delicately balanced and subtly contrasted. The orchestral output--don't call it accompaniment--lends new layers of meaning to the concept of purposeful busyness. The percussive interplay provides heroically assertive punctuation.

The composer Igor Stravinsky reportedly regarded the Double Concerto as a masterpiece. The composer Harrison Birtwistle similarly wrote of the piece:

I judge a lot of music by asking: "Would I like to have written it?" And with my favourite Carter pieces, I certainly would. I love the Double Concerto for piano, harpsichord and two chamber orchestras. There's nothing like it in music: the concept, the way it makes time and rhythm move, the instrumentation – that bloody harpsichord! Whether it's playable or not, I'm not sure, because it's so difficult. Along with Pierre Boulez's Le Marteau Sans Maître, the Double Concerto is one of the unique signposts of the 20th century.

The pianist Charles Rosen, who first performed the piano solo of the work, described the Double Concerto as "Carter's most brilliantly attractive and apparently most complex work." He added:

The history of the Double Concerto is one of a gradual but irregular progress of understanding, perception, and sympathy. When the work first appeared, there were hardly any performers who did not, at least secretly, regret the absence of the central pulse that made ensemble playing so much easier, just as those who saw the first cubist pictures must necessarily have felt—along with a liberated excitement—a curious anxiety at the loss of the central point of view destroyed by cubist fragmentation. A multiplicity of vision has become central to the artistic imagination of the twentieth century. Carter's is the richest and most coherent realization of this multiplicity in the music of our time. The simplicity and directness of his achievement, however, its permanence and its solidity, are only beginning to be felt.
