= Jaime Laredo =

American violinist and conductor (born 1941)

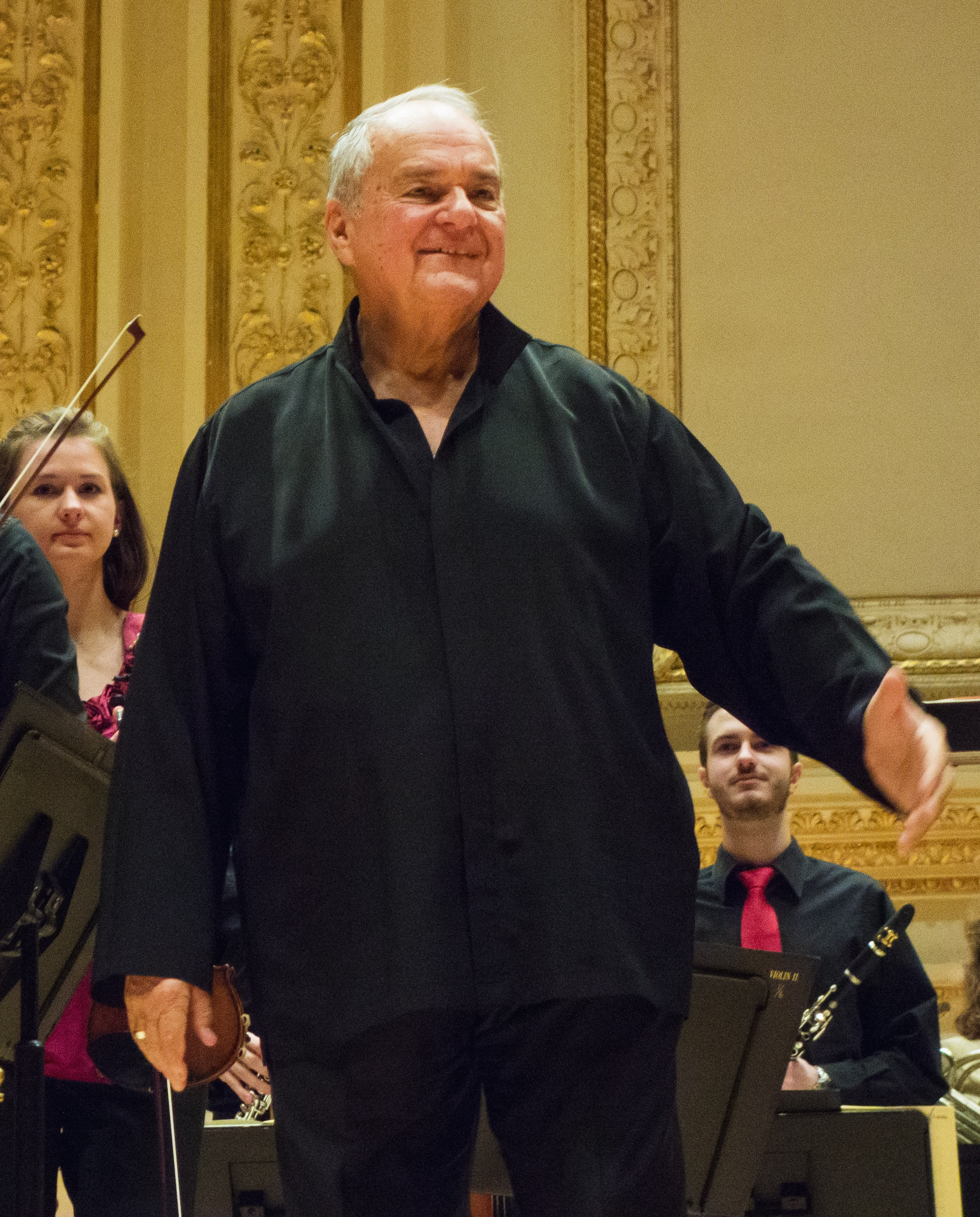
Jaime Laredo in 2014

Jaime Laredo (born June 7, 1941, in Cochabamba, Bolivia) is a Grammy-award-winning American violinist, violist, conductor, and music educator of Bolivian heritage. He is also the president of the jury of the International Violin Competition of Indianapolis Laredo entered the international classical music scene at age 17 in 1959 when he won First Prize for violin at the International Queen Elisabeth Competition in Brussels, Belgium (at the time, the youngest winner in the history of the prize and the first Latin American). Since then, Laredo has had an uninterrupted and celebrated 65-year career in classical symphonic and chamber music, mostly in the United States, as a violinist, violist, conductor, and educator, receiving numerous accolades, awards and honors.

Laredo has played with or conducted some of the leading symphony orchestras in the world. During his career, he has made approximately 100 recordings. As a violinist, playing with, and conducting, the Scottish Chamber Orchestra, Laredo in 1986 recorded Antonio Vivaldi's "Four Seasons", which appeared on the United Kingdom classical music best seller list for one year.

In 1992, as a violist, Laredo won a Grammy for best chamber music performance of Brahms's quartets. Laredo was inducted into the American Academy of Arts & Sciences in 2010. Bolivia, the country of his birth, has awarded Laredo its highest national decoration (the Order of the Condor of the Andes), has issued postage stamps bearing his image, and has named a large outdoor amphitheater in the capital, La Paz, in his honor. He is considered a national hero.

== Early life ==
Laredo's parents were Eduardo Laredo Quiroga and Elena Unzueta Urquidi, both lovers of classical music, fine art and poetry from established bourgeois families. Eduardo Laredo was an amateur pianist, who would take his young son to recitals at the conservatory in Cochabamba. After hearing and watching a string quartet, five-year-old Jaime told his father he would like to play the violin. The following Christmas, Eduardo gave his son a 1/2 size violin. Laredo was a child prodigy. His first violin teacher was Carlos Flamini, an Italian violinist from Vienna, Austria, who had fled Europe at the beginning of the Second World War. Laredo began to play at age five and performed his first concert in Bolivia. Thereafter, in 1947, his parents sold their house in Cochabamba and moved to the United States to further the development of their son's musical talent, settling initially in San Francisco, where the elder Laredo found a position at the Bolivian consulate. In 1952, Laredo made his debut performance at age 11 with the San Francisco Symphony. Also in 1952, the Bolivian National Revolution occurred and there was a change of government in Bolivia, one consequence of which was the loss of Eduardo Laredo's position at the Bolivian consulate in San Francisco. When the family's money ran out, Eduardo Laredo resorted to driving delivery trucks and taxi cabs to support themselves.

== Career ==
=== Soloist ===
Beginning in 1948, Laredo took lessons from Antonio de Grassi. He also studied with Frank Houser before moving to Cleveland, Ohio, to study under Josef Gingold in 1953. He studied with Ivan Galamian at the Curtis Institute of Music until his graduation. He also received private mentoring from Pablo Casals and George Szell. In 1976, he was a soloist with the Naumburg Orchestral Concerts, in the Naumburg Bandshell, Central Park, in the summer series.

His Carnegie Hall recital in October 1960 was much praised, and helped to launch his career. The next year, he played at Royal Albert Hall in London. Afterwards, he has played with many major European and American orchestras, including the Royal Liverpool Philharmonic Orchestra, Boston Symphony Orchestra, the Chicago Symphony Orchestra, the New York Philharmonic, the Cleveland Orchestra, the Philadelphia Orchestra, the Los Angeles Philharmonic Orchestra, the London Symphony Orchestra, the Royal Philharmonic, the Scottish Chamber Orchestra, the Sarasota Orchestra, The Children's Orchestra Society and the Syracuse Symphony Orchestra.

=== Orchestra conductor ===
He was the conductor and music director of the Scottish Chamber Orchestra from 1975 to 2000, the New York String Orchestra Seminar from 1993 to 2025, the Vermont Symphony Orchestra from 1999 to 2020, the Westchester Philharmonic Orchestra from 2021 to the present, and the Bolivia Clasica Youth Orchestra in 2014. He served as artistic advisor for the Fort Wayne Philharmonic Orchestra and guest conducted the orchestra on April 18, 2009, in a program featuring his wife, the cellist Sharon Robinson. Laredo and Robinson were also featured soloists in a special concert conducted by Andrew Constantine, who became the Philharmonic's music director in July 2009. Laredo has been a guest conductor for the Orchestre National de Lyon, the New World Symphony, the Seattle Symphony, the Los Angeles Philharmonic, the Boston Symphony Orchestra, the Chicago Symphony Orchestra, the New York Philharmonic, the Detroit Symphony Orchestra, the St. Louis Symphony Orchestra and the Philadelphia Orchestra, the Sarasota Orchestra, and the Curtis Institute Orchestra. International orchestras with which he performed or conducted include the London Symphony Orchestra, the BBC Symphony Orchestra, the English Chamber Orchestra, the Royal Philharmonic Orchestra and the Academy of St. Martin-in-the-Fields.

=== Chamber music ===
For 15 years, Laredo played viola, and recorded piano quartets with Isaac Stern, Yo-Yo Ma, and Emanuel Ax. In 1992, the quartet won a Grammy for its performance of Brahms.

In addition, he collaborated with pianist Glenn Gould performing works by Bach.

For 45 years, until the death of Kalichstein in 2022, Laredo was the violinist of the Kalichstein-Laredo-Robinson Trio, along with pianist Joseph Kalichstein and cellist Sharon Robinson. The debut performance of the Kalichstein-Laredo-Robinson Trio was in 1977 at the presidential inauguration of Jimmy Carter in Washington, D.C. In 1980, the Trio headlined the International Festival of Music and Dance in Granada, Spain.

Beginning in 2024, Laredo has formed a piano quartet called Espressivo! with pianist Anna Polonsky, violist Milena Pajaro-van de Stadt and cellist Sharon Robinson; Laredo plays the violin for this piano quartet.

=== Educator and mentor ===
Laredo was a professor at the Jacobs School of Music at Indiana University from 2005 to 2012. In 2012, the Cleveland Institute of Music announced the appointment of Laredo and wife Sharon Robinson to the string faculty, an appointment lasting until 2024. Prior to that appointment, Laredo was a professor at the Curtis Institute of Music from 1971 to 2004. Since January 2025, he has been an artist in residence at the Oberlin Conservatory of Music.

Laredo led the New York String Orchestra Seminar from 1993 to 2025. This is an ensemble of the best young classical musicians in the United States, ages 16–23, selected through a highly competitive process. They convene in New York City for two weeks each December and then perform a concert at Carnegie Hall on the evening of December 24.

In 2017, the American String Teachers Association honored him with its Artist Teacher Award. As a master violin teacher, Laredo has been instrumental in the development of many renowned violinists including Jennifer Koh, Leila Josefowicz, Hillary Hahn, Ivan Chan, Soovin Kim, Pamela Frank, and Bella Hristova.

=== World premieres ===
Jaime Laredo has also been a featured performer for multiple world premieres of music for classical instruments composed by contemporary composers.

- Double Concerto (Rorem), a composition for violin, cello and orchestra by the American composer Ned Rorem, which was commissioned by the Indianapolis Symphony Orchestra for performance by violinist Jaime Laredo and cellist Sharon Robinson. The piece was first performed by the Indianapolis Symphony Orchestra conducted by Raymond Leppard in Indianapolis on October 15, 1998.
- In the Arms of the Beloved Richard Danielpour, a double concerto for violin (Jaime Laredo), cello (Sharon Robinson) and orchestra (Michael Stern conducting the IRIS Chamber Orchestra) inspired by the poetry of Persian poet Rumi and composed to celebrate the 25th wedding anniversary of Jaime Laredo and Sharon Robinson; the world premiere took place in Germantown, Tennessee, on April 20, 2002.
- Prince of Clouds, is a double concerto for two vioins and string orchestra by the British-born composer Anna Clyne. The work was jointly commissioned by the Chicago Symphony Orchestra, the IRIS Orchestra, the Los Angeles Chamber Orchestra, and the Curtis Institute of Music. It was first performed by the violinists Jennifer Koh and Jaime Laredo with the IRIS Orchesra under conductor Michael Stern on November 3, 2012, in Germantown, Tennessee. The piece was nominated for the 2015 Grammy Award for Best Classical Contemporary Composition.
- Double Concerto (Previn), a composition for violin, cello and orchestra by the German-American composer Andre Previn, which was commissioned by the Cincinnati Symphony Orchestra, Linton Music and other benefactors. The world premiere was given by violinist Jaime Laredo and cellist Sharon Robinson with the Cincinnati Symphony Orchestra under the direction of Louis Langree in Cincinnati on November 21, 2014.
- Joy Steppin' Nokuthula Ngwenyama, a composition commissioned for the piano quartet Espressivo! and inspired by The Book of Joy by the 14th Dalai Lama and Archbishop Desmond Tutu; the world premiere took place in Cincinnati, Ohio on October 20, 2024

== Public image and legacy ==
=== In Bolivia ===
Ever since Laredo's 1959 triumph at the Queen Elisabeth Competition in Brussels, Belgium, he has enjoyed hero status in the country of his birth. Tens of thousands of people lined the streets and filled the Estadio Hernando Siles football stadium to pay tribute to him in December 1959 when he received a hero's welcome in the city of La Paz presided by the President Hernan Siles Zuazo.

Laredo has been the subject of the Bolivian documentary film "Laredo de Bolivia" directed by Jorge Ruiz Calvimonte.

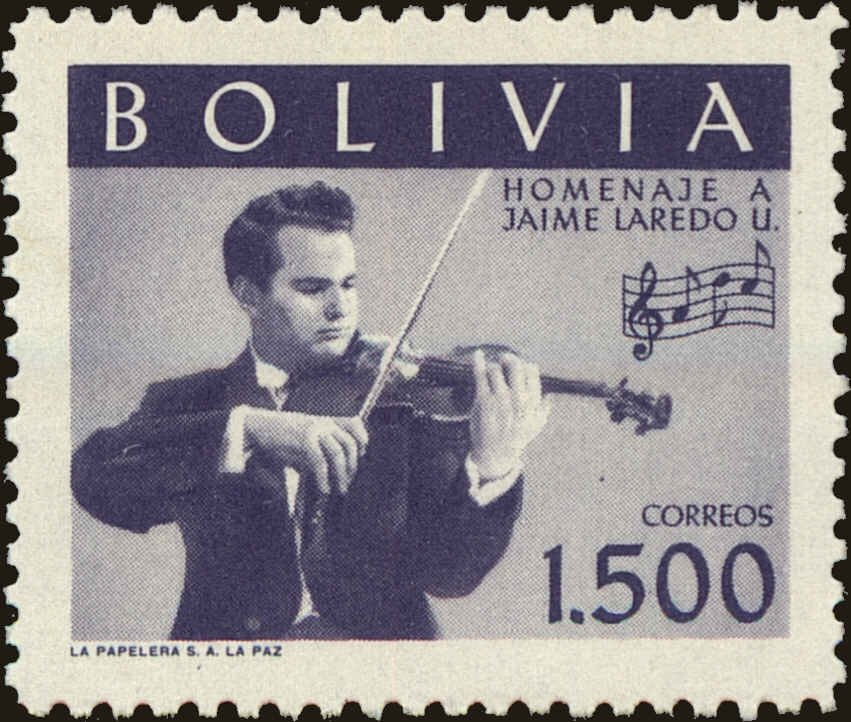
Bolivian commemorative postage stamp featuring Laredo in 1960

In 1960, the Bolivian postal service issued a set of commemorative stamps in honor of Laredo (the issue consisted of twelve values, including both regular and airmail denominations, depicting Laredo playing the violin).

There is a large outdoor amphitheater, with a seating capacity of 8,000 people, in the city of La Paz named after him--'Teatro al Aire Libre Jaime Laredo Unzueta.' There is also a music academy in the city of Cochabamba, his place of birth, named in honor of Jaime Laredo's father--"Instituto Eduardo Laredo."

In August 2014, after an absence of 33 years, Laredo reconnected with his Bolivian roots by performing in a series of concerts with the orchestra of the Fundacion Bolivia Clasica in the cities of Santa Cruz, Cochabamba, and La Paz (where he performed both at the Teatro Municipal Alberto Saavedra and also at the Michael Donohue Theater at the American Cooperative School of La Paz). Initially, the organizers of the tour had wanted to also include performances either in the Salar de Uyuni or on the Isla de la Luna, but logistical challenges proved to be insurmountable. In addition to performing works by classical composers such as Bach, Laredo also assisted in conducting orchestral arrangements of pieces by Bolivian composers (Collita and Viva Mi Patria Bolivia) In addition, Laredo gave master classes to young Bolivian musicians. During the tour, Laredo was accompanied by his wife, the cellist Sharon Robinson, and by his hostess, the pianist Ana-Maria Vera. These concerts were sponored by a not-for-profit organization called "Bolivia Clasica" founded by the American concert pianist of Bolivian-Dutch heritage Ana-Maria Vera.

=== In the United States ===
Laredo has been featured in television programs in the United States, including on PBS-Public Broadcasting System.

From 1994 to 2025, Laredo has been the leader of the jury for the International Violin Competition of Indianapolis.

In addition to having had career success as a violinist and violist and as an orchestra conductor, Laredo is also known for his career as a pedagogue and mentor for the younger generation of classical musicians, including as the conductor of the New York String Orchestra seminar (1993–2025), which performs a concert at Carnegie Hall every year in December.

== Personal life ==
Jaime Laredo was married to the pianist Ruth Laredo (née Meckler), whom he met at the Curtis Institute in Philadelphia, from 1960 to 1974. From this marriage, he has a daughter Jennifer Laredo Meckler, whose husband is Paul Watkins, the chief conductor of the English Chamber Orchestra. Jaime Laredo married cellist Sharon Robinson in November 1976. They also have a professional association, first with the Kalichstein-Laredo-Robinson piano trio and also with the Espressivo! piano quartet.

== Honors, competitions, prizes, and awards ==
- Queen Elisabeth of Belgium Competition First Prize, Violin (1959)
- Grand Cross of the Order of the Condor of the Andes (Gran Cruz de la Orden del Condor de los Andes) by Supreme Decree No. 5368 of December 10, 1959
- Deutsche Schallplatten Prize
- Several Emmy Award nominations
- Nominated for the Grammy Award seven times
  - 1959: 'Presenting Jaime Laredo' (Album) [soloist]
  - 1960: 'Bach: Partita No.3 in E and Brahms: Sonata No. 3 in D Minor' (Album) [solo or duo]
  - 1975: 'Ravel: Trio for Violin, Cello and Piano' (Album) [chamber music]
  - 1991: 'Brahms: Piano Quartets (Op. 25 & 26)' [chamber music]
  - 1992: 'Brahms: Sextets, Opp 18 and 36; Theme and Variations' [chamber music]
  - 1993: 'Faure: Piano Quartets Nos. 1 and 2' [chamber music]
  - 1997: 'Schubert/Boccherini: Quintets (Schubert: Quintet in C Major / Boccherini: Quintet in E Major)' (Album) [chamber music]
- Grammy Award for Best Chamber Music Performance 1992: Emanuel Ax, Jaime Laredo, Yo-Yo Ma & Isaac Stern for Brahms: Piano Quartets (Op. 25 and 26) (1992)
- Musical America Magazine 2002 "Ensemble of the Year" Award for the Kalichstein-Laredo-Robinson Trio
- Honorary Doctorate of Music (2006), Cleveland Institute of Music
- Vermont Governor's Award for Excellence in the Arts (2006)
- American Academy of Arts & Sciences (2010)
- 2017 Artist Teacher Award of the American String Teachers Association
- State of Vermont House of Representatives published a Concurrent House Resolution, H.C.R. 38, dated April 27, 2021, honoring the musical achievements of Vermont Symphony Orchestra Music Director Jaime Laredo
- Nominated for the 2026 Princess of Asturias Prize Premio Princesa de Asturias in the Arts

== Partial discography ==
- Judith Blegen & Frederica von Stade: Songs, Arias & Duets, with the Chamber Music Society of Lincoln Center, Columbia, 1975
- Vivaldi, The Four Seasons, with the Scottish Chamber Orchestra, IMP Classics, 1985
- Vivaldi, Great String Concertos, with the Scottish Chamber Orchestra, IMP Classics, 1985
- Bach, Great String Concertos, with the Scottish Chamber Orchestra, IMP Classics, 1986
- Mendelssohn-Bruch, Violin Concertos, with the Scottish Chamber Orchestra, IMP Classics, 1987
- Beethoven, Violin Concerto and Violin Romances, with the Scottish Chamber Orchestra, IMP Classics, 1987
