= Double concerto =

Concerto featuring two performers

A double concerto (Italian: Doppio concerto; German: Doppelkonzert) is a concerto featuring two performers —as opposed to the usual single performer— in the solo role. The two performers' instruments may be of the same type, as in Bach's Double Violin Concerto, or different, as in Brahms's Concerto for Violin, Cello and Orchestra.

== Terminology ==
The term can also refer to the use of a double orchestral body where a work is in concerto grosso form; for example, Martinů's Double Concerto for Two String Orchestras, Piano, and Timpani is commonly known by the title "Double Concerto," where the word "double" refers to the two string bodies rather than to the piano and timpani, who are not soloists in the conventional sense.

== Triple and quadruple concertos ==
Concertos with more than two solo parts may be known by the terms "triple concerto", "quadruple concerto", etc., but not usually when the instruments are of the same type (for example, Vivaldi's Concerto for Four Violins in B minor, catalogued as RV 580 and transcribed in A minor for four harpsichords by Bach as BWV 1065).

One common arrangement for a triple concerto is for violin, cello, and piano, as in Beethoven's Triple Concerto for Violin, Cello, Piano and Orchestra and numerous twentieth century works.

One of Olivier Messiaen's final works, Concert à quatre, is a quadruple concerto.

== List of notable double concertos ==
=== For two soloists ===
- Antonio Vivaldi
  - Concerto for 2 cellos, strings, and continuo in G minor (RV 531)
  - Concerto for viola d'amore, lute, strings, and continuo in D minor, RV 540
- Johann Sebastian Bach
  - Concerto for Two Violins in D minor
  - Concerto for two harpsichords in C minor, BWV 1060
  - Concerto for two harpsichords in C major, BWV 1061
  - Concerto for two harpsichords in C minor, BWV 1062
- Georg Philipp Telemann
  - Concerto for Two Chalumeaux, Strings, and Continuo in D minor, TMV 52:d1
  - Concerto for Two Horns, Strings, and Continuo in D Major TWV 52:D1
  - Concerto for Two Horns, Strings, and Continuo in D Major TWV 52:D2
  - Concerto for Recorder, Bassoon, Strings, and Continuo in F Major, TWV 52:F1
  - Concerto in E Minor for Recorder, Flute, Strings and Continuo, TWV 52:e1
  - Concerto for Recorder, Viola da gamba, Strings, and Continuo in A Minor, TWV 52:a1
  - Concerto for Two Violas, Strings, and Continuo in G major, TWV 52:G3,
  - Concerto for 2 Recorders, Strings, and Continuo in A Minor, TWV 52:a2
  - Concerto for 2 Recorders, Strings, and Continuo in B-flat Major, TWV 52:B1
- Joseph Haydn, Concerto in F major, Hob. XVIII/6, for piano, violin, and strings (before 1766)
- Wolfgang Amadeus Mozart
  - Concerto for Violin, Piano, and Orchestra (fragment, 1778)
  - Concerto for Flute, Harp, and Orchestra (1778)
  - Concerto No. 10 for Two Pianos (1779)
  - Sinfonia Concertante for Violin, Viola and Orchestra K364 (1779)
- Johann Nepomuk Hummel, Concerto for Violin and Piano, Op. 17 (1805)
- Felix Mendelssohn
  - Concerto for Violin, Piano and Strings (1823)
  - Concerto No. 1 for Two Pianos and Orchestra (1823)
  - Concerto No. 2 for Two Pianos and Orchestra (1824)
- Johannes Brahms, Concerto for Violin, Cello and Orchestra (1887)
- Max Bruch
  - Concerto for Clarinet, Viola, and Orchestra (1911)
  - Concerto for Two Pianos and Orchestra Op88a, (1912)
- Frederick Delius, Double Concerto for violin, cello, and orchestra (1915)
- Francis Poulenc, Concerto for Two Pianos and Orchestra (1932)
- Benjamin Britten, Double Concerto for Violin, Viola and Orchestra (1932)
- Igor Stravinsky, Concerto for Two Pianos (1935)
- Béla Bartók, Concerto for Two Pianos and Orchestra (1940)
- Richard Strauss, Duet-concertino for clarinet and bassoon (1947)
- Arthur Honegger, Concerto da camera for flute, English horn, and string orchestra (1948)
- Elliott Carter, Double Concerto for Harpsichord and Piano with Two Chamber Orchestras (1961)
- Malcolm Arnold, Concerto for Two Violins and String Orchestra (1962)
- Hans Werner Henze, Double Concerto for Oboe, Harp and Strings (1966)
- Arvo Pärt, Tabula Rasa (for two violins) (1977)
- Rob du Bois, Concerto for two violins and orchestra (1979)
- Witold Lutosławski, Double Concerto for Oboe, Harp and Chamber Orchestra (1979–80)
- Peter Maxwell Davies
  - Strathclyde Concerto No. 3, for horn, trumpet, and orchestra (1989)
  - Strathclyde Concerto No. 5, for violin, viola, and string orchestra (1991)
- Jeremy Beck, Concertino for Two Cellos and String Orchestra (2006)
- Behzad Ranjbaran, Concerto for Violin and Viola and Orchestra (2009)
- Philip Glass, Double Concerto for Violin and Cello (2010), Double Concerto for Two Pianos (2015)
- Thomas Enhco, Double Concerto for Marimba, Piano and Orchestra (2019)

=== For two orchestras ===
- Bohuslav Martinů, Double Concerto for Two String Orchestras, Piano, and Timpani (1938)
- Michael Tippett, Concerto for Double String Orchestra (1938–39)
- Elliott Carter, Double Concerto for Harpsichord and Piano with Two Chamber Orchestras (1961)
- Sofia Gubaidulina – Concerto for Two Orchestras (1976)

== See also ==
- List of double concertos for violin and cello
- Concerto for Two Pianos and Orchestra (disambiguation)
