= Sharon Robinson (cellist) =

American cellist (born 1949)

Sharon Hall Robinson (born December 2, 1949) is an American cellist. She has had a successful performing career, both as a concert solo artist and as a member of the Kalichstein-Laredo-Robinson Trio, and has recorded extensively.

== Early life and musical training ==
Robinson was born in Houston, Texas, the daughter of Keith Robinson and Dorothe Fowler. Both parents were members of the Houston Symphony Orchestra: her father was the principal bassist, and her mother was a violinist. Sharon and all four of her siblings—bassist Hal, violinists Erica and Kim, and cellist Keith Jr.—became professional string players with notable careers.

Sharon Robinson graduated from the North Carolina School of the Arts in 1968. She attended the University of Southern California in Los Angeles and the Peabody Institute in Baltimore, Maryland, from which she graduated with a bachelor's degree in 1972.

== Career ==
Sharon Robinson made her New York performance debut in 1974, collaborating with violinist/violist Jaime Laredo and pianist Samuel Sanders on a chamber music recital. Of her 1977 solo recital debut, which featured works of Ludwig van Beethoven, Benjamin Britten, George Crumb, and Sergei Rachmaninoff, the New York Times music critic Allen Hughes said, "she revealed an artistic personality that vitalized almost everything she played ... The cello tone glowed ...the result was lovely ...an impressive debut."

Robinson has performed as a soloist with the symphony orchestras of Baltimore, Boston, Dallas, Helsinki, Houston, London, Los Angeles, Minnesota, Philadelphia, Pittsburgh, St. Louis, and San Francisco; the National Symphony in Washington, D.C., and the Tonhalle Orchestra of Zürich; and the English, Scottish, and Franz Liszt Chamber Orchestras.

In 1977, Robinson and two colleagues, violinist Jaime Laredo and pianist Joseph Kalichstein, formed the Kalichstein-Laredo-Robinson Trio, a piano trio. The group, which has performed and recorded worldwide (while maintaining its original personnel), is considered among the finest chamber ensembles in existence.

Robinson has participated in numerous music festivals, including Aspen, Autumn (in Prague), Edinburgh, Granada, Madeira, Marlboro, Mostly Mozart (New York), South Bank (in London), and Spoleto. She has appeared on television programs including Sunday Morning and The Kennedy Center Honors (CBS), The Today Show and The Tonight Show (NBC), Great Conversations in Music (PBS), and The Dick Cavett Show. She has taught privately and led master classes worldwide, and in 2005 was appointed to the faculty of the Jacobs School of Music at Indiana University.

Among the many composers who have accepted commissions to write works for Robinson are Richard Danielpour, Daron Hagen, Katherine Hoover, Leon Kirchner, David Ott, Arvo Pärt, Ned Rorem, Stanley Silverman, Andy Stein, and Ellen Taaffe Zwilich.

The Cleveland Institute of Music announced the appointment of Robinson and husband Jaime Laredo to the string faculty in 2012.

Sharon Robinson's many awards include the Avery Fisher Recital Award, the Piatigorsky Memorial Award, and a nomination for a Grammy Award.

== Personal life ==
Sharon Robinson has been married since 1977 to her trio colleague, the Bolivian-American violinist, violist, and conductor Jaime Laredo.

== Recordings ==
Sharon Robinson's discography includes over a dozen recordings of solo and chamber music on the Arabesque, Bridge, Chandos, First Edition, Koch International, Sony Classical, and Vox labels.
