= List of solo cello pieces =

This is a list of notable solo cello pieces. It includes arrangements and transcriptions.

== A ==
- Joseph Abaco
  - 11 Capricci for Violoncello Solo
- Samuel Adler
  - Sonata (1965)
- Kalevi Aho
  - Solo IV (1997)
- Hugh Aitken
  - For the Cello (1980)
- Franghis Ali-Zadeh
  - Ask Havasi (part of the cycle Silk Road) (1998)
  - Oyan (2005)
- Maarten Altena
  - Figura (1993)
- Mark Andre
  - iv 2 pour violoncelle solo (2007)
- Georges Aperghis
  - Sonate (1994)
- Tanya Anisimova
  - Song on Mt. San Angelo
- Georgi Arnaoudov
  - Kells (1999)
  - Three Sonets of Michelangelo (2014)
- Violet Archer
  - Improvisation (1983)
- Malcolm Arnold
  - Fantasy (1987)
- Daniel Asia
  - Cello Suite
- Lera Auerbach
  - Sonata for Solo Violoncello, Op. 72 (2003)
  - La Suite dels Ocells [Homage to Pablo Casals] (2015)

== B ==
- Johann Sebastian Bach
  - Cello Suites, BWV 1007–1012 (c. 1720)
- Nicolas Bacri
  - Suite, Op. 31
  - Suite, Op. 50, No. 4 (1994–96; written for Emmanuelle Bertrand)
- Henk Badings
  - Sonata No. 2
- David N. Baker
  - Sonata (1990)
- Don Banks
  - Sequence (1967)
- Gennady Banshchikov
  - Concerto for cello No. 3 for solo cello (1965)
- Granville Bantock
  - Sonata in G minor (1924)
- Rami Bar-Niv
  - Improvisation
- Arnold Bax
  - Rhapsodic Ballad (1939)
- Sally Beamish
  - Gala Water for solo cello (1988)
  - The Wise Maid
- Conrad Beck
  - Epigrams (for Paul Sacher)
- Grant Beglarian
  - Elegy for Cellist for solo cello (1979)
- Paul Ben-Haim
  - Music (1974)
- Richard Rodney Bennett
  - Scena II (1973)
- Niels Viggo Bentzon
  - Sonata, Op. 110 (1956)
  - Variations on "The Volga Boatmen", Op. 354 (1974)
  - 16 Etudes, Op. 464 (1984)
  - Sonata, Op. 110
- Esteban Benzecry
  - Suite "Prisme du Sud" (1970)
- Gunnar Berg
  - Suite pour violoncelle seul (1950)
- Michael Berkeley
  - Iberian Notebook Suite (1980)
- Luciano Berio
  - Les mots sont allés (1978; for Paul Sacher)
  - Sequenza VIb (1981)
  - Chanson pour Pierre Boulez (Song for Pierre Boulez) (2000)
  - Sequenza XIV (2002)
- Christoph Otto Beyer
  - Sonate für Violoncello solo (2006)
  - Passacaglia e Fuga
- Gunther Bialas
  - Romanze (for Hoelscher) (1987)
- Jörg Birkenkötter
  - Solo für Violoncello (1986)
- Ernest Bloch
  - Suite No. 1 (1956) (written for Zara Nelsova)
  - Suite No. 2 (1956) (written for Zara Nelsova)
  - Suite No. 3 (1957)
- William Bolcom
  - Suite in C minor (1994)
- Ennio Bolognini
  - Adagio and Allegro
  - Fiesta Baska - Lamada Montanesa
  - Seranata de Bolonini
  - Seranata del Eco
  - Serenata Del Gaucho
  - Prelude and Fugue on a theme of Purcell
  - Cello's Prayer
- Nimrod Borenstein
  - "Soliloquy, Op. 59"
- Sergei Bortkiewicz
  - Suite, Op. 41
- Hans Bottermund - Janos Starker
  - Variations on a Theme by Paganini
- Hendrik Bouman
  - Suite in D major (2003)
- Reiner Bredemeyer (1929–1995)
  - Solo 1 (1973)
  - Solo 6 (1980; written for H.J. Scheitzbach)
- Allen Brings
  - Sonata da chiesa for solo cello (1980, dedicated to Alexander Kouguell)
- Benjamin Britten
  - Cello Suites (Suite No. 1, Op. 72 (1964), Suite No. 2, Op. 80 (1967), Suite No. 3, Op. 87 (1972))
  - Tema "Sacher" (for Paul Sacher)
- Stephen Brown
  - Cello suites

Takkakaw Falls (2003, 2004)
Fire (2005, revised 2012)
There Was a Lady in the East (2007)
Lilies and the Roses (2011, revised 2013)
Magneto (2012)
Flowers of the Forest (2013)

- Leo Brouwer
  - Sonata (1960)
- Mikhail Bukinik
  - 4 Concert Etudes (No. 4 in F minor)
- Sylvano Bussotti
  - Deborah Parker (1987)
  - Variazione
- Yuri Butzko
  - Partita for solo cello

== C ==
- John Cage
  - One^{8} (1991)
  - 59½ Seconds (1953)
  - Atlas Eclipticalis (1961)
  - Solo for Cello (1958)
  - Variations I (1958)
  - Etudes Boreales (1978)
- Elliott Carter
  - Figment (1994)
  - Figment No. 2, Remembering Mr. Ives (2001)
- Gaspar Cassadó
  - Suite (1926)
- Geghuni Chitchjan
  - Sonata for solo cello (1983)
- Frédéric Chopin
  - Etude in A♭ major, Op. 25, No. 1 (trans. Cassadó)
- Nigel Clarke
  - Spectroscope (1987)
  - Sonata in D minor for baroque cello or viola da gamba (2009)
- Aaron D. Clay (b. 1967)
  - 'Still Mirror' and 'Distance Unknown' for solo cello (2021) (written for Jennifer Kloetzel)
- Dan Coleman (b. 1972)
  - 'afterword' (2020) (written for Jennifer Kloetzel)
- Michael Colgrass
  - Wolf (1975)
- Giuseppe Colombi (1635–1694)
  - Chiacona a Basso Solo (1670)
  - Toccata da Violone Solo (Toccata ) (1670)
- John Corigliano
  - Fancy on a Bach air (1997; premiered by Yo-Yo Ma)
- Henry Cowell
  - Gravely and Vigorously (Hymn & Fuguing Tune No. 17) (1963; in memory of Kennedy)
- George Crumb
  - Sonata for Solo Cello, (1955)

== D ==
- Luigi Dallapiccola
  - Adagio (1947)
  - Ciaccona, Intermezzo e Adagio (1945)
- Jean-Luc Darbellay
  - Solo (1997)
- Michael Daugherty
  - Jackie's Song (2000)
- Johann Nepomuk David
  - 2 Solo Sonatas
- Mario Davidovsky
  - Synchronisms No. 3 (1964), and electronic sound
- Robert deMaine
  - Twelve Études-Caprices, Op. 31 (1999)
  - Unaccompanied Sonata
- Edison Denisov
  - Cadenzas for two cello concertos in D major and C major by Haydn (1982)
- Patrick van Deurzen
  - Monologue (2011)
- David Diamond
  - Sonata for Violoncello Alone (1959)
- Friedhelm Dohl
  - Fantasie - Kadenz
  - Klezmeriana for solo cello (1983)
- Franco Donatoni
  - Lame (1982)
- Friedrich Dotzauer
  - 113 Etudes for Cello
- John Downey
  - Lydian Suite (1975)
- Zsolt Durkó
  - Solo Suite No. 1 (1979)
- Henri Dutilleux
  - Trois Strophes sur le Nom de SACHER (1976–82) (for Paul Sacher)

== E ==
- David Eby
  - Celtic Passage
- Gerald Eckert
  - Nôema (1992/93)
- Søren Nils Eichberg
  - Variations on a theme by Niccolo Paganini (2005)
- Jose Elizondo
  - Unter dem Sternenhimmel des Rheins (Under the starry sky of the Rhine) (2020)
  - Cantabrigian Reflections (2020)
  - Danzas Latinoamericanas (Latin American Dances) (1997)
  - Otoño en Buenos Aires (Autumn in Buenos Aires) (1997)
  - Pan de Azúcar (Sugar Loaf mountain) (1997)
  - Atardecer Tapatío (Sunset in Guadalajara) (1997)
  - Baroque Dances (1997)
  - La alborada de la esperanza (The Dawn of Hope) (2018)
  - Limoncello (2018)
  - Crepúsculos (Twilights) (2018)
  - Princesa de hadas (Fairy Tale Princess) (1995)
  - Excursión a la montaña (Excursion to the Mountain) (1995)
- Hans Ulrich Engelmann
  - Mini-music to Siegfried Palm, Op. 38 (1970)
- Sven Einar Englund
  - Suite (1986)
- Gottfried von Einem
  - Music, Op. 108 (1996)
- Iván Erőd
  - Hommage à Beethoven, Op. 24 (Rhapsodie für Violoncello solo über Themen der Sonate, Op. 102/1 von Ludwig van Beethoven) (1977)
- Rudolf George Escher
  - Sonata for solo Violoncello (1945–48)
- Pozzi Escot
  - Sonata (2002)

== F ==
- Morton Feldman
  - Projection I (1950)
  - Intersection IV (1953)
- Richard Festinger
  - Upon The Viol (2012)
- Ross Lee Finney
  - Chromatic Fantasy in E (1957)
- Graciane Finzi
  - Theme and Variations to el cant dels ocells
- Elena Firsova
  - The Rest is Silence (2002)
- Luboš Fišer (1935–1999)
  - Sonata (1987)
- Thomas Flaherty
  - Semi-Suite (1990)
  - Remembrance of Things Present (2006)
- Alexandra Fol
  - Almost Serial (1999)
- Carlo Forlivesi
  - Più Mesto for 2-bow solo cello (2003)
- Wolfgang Fortner
  - Suite (Schott) (for Paul Sacher)
  - Zum Spielen für den 70. Geburtstag: Theme and Variationen (1976)
- Ilse Fromm-Michaels
  - Suite, Op. 15 (Sikorski)
- Rudolf Escher
  - Sonata (1955)

== G ==
- Domenico Gabrielli
  - Seven Ricercari (1689)
- Hans Gál
  - Sonata for violoncello solo op.109a (1982)
- Orlando Jacinto Garcia
  - Crystalline Sounds of the Night
- Ada Gentile
  - Pervioloncellosolo () (1996)
- Sarah Gibson (1986-2024)
  - "Carry" for solo cello (2021) (written for Jennifer Kloetzel)
- Michael Gielen
  - Weitblick Sonata (1991)
- Alberto Ginastera (1916–83)
  - Puneña No. 2, Op. 45 (Hommage à Paul Sacher)
- Detlev Glanert
  - Fünf Wüstenlieder (five Desert Songs) (1999)
- Philip Glass
  - Songs and Poems (in 7 movements) (2007)
  - Orbit (2013)
- Friedrich Goldmann
  - Cellomusik (1974)
- Marin Goleminov
  - Sonata (1969)
- Osvaldo Golijov
  - Omaramor (1991)
- Andrei Golovin
  - Elegy for solo cello (1988)
- Yevgeny Golubev
  - 2 Etudes for solo cello, Op. 46 (1961)
  - Concert Aria for solo cello (1961)
- Leonid Grabovsky (Hrabovsky)
  - Hlas I (1990)
  - Voices for solo cello (1990)
- Olivier Greif
  - Solo from Nô, Op. 154, for Christoph Henkel (1981) for solo cello
- Jorge Grundman
  - Terezin Through the Eyes of the Children for Solo Cello (2012)
- Sofia Gubaidulina
  - Ten Preludes (1974)
  - Quaternion for solo cello

== H ==
- Alois Haba
  - Fantasy in quarter-tones (1924)
- Daron Hagen
  - Suite (1985)
  - Higher, Louder, Faster, an editorial etude (1987)
- Cristobal Halffter
  - Variations on the theme eSACHERe (for Paul Sacher)
- Hermann Haller
  - Trois pieces pour violoncelle seul (3 pieces )
- George Frideric Handel
  - Air and Variations "The Harmonious Blacksmith" from Suite for Harpsichord in E major, HWV 430 arr. Cassadó
  - Passacaglia - Theme and Variations (arr. Zinoviy Dynov based on the Halvorsen version)
- John Harbison
  - Suite (1994)
- Jonathan Harvey
  - Curve with Plateaux for Helen Verney (1983)
- Teppo Hauta-aho
  - Improvatio (1971)
- David Philip Hefti
  - Ritus - 4 Dance Collages (2007)
- Bernhard Heiden
  - Variations on "Lilliburlero"
- Paavo Heininen
  - Cantilena I, Op. 24c (1970)
  - Cantilena II, Op. 26 (1970)
  - Poesie des pensées, Op. 23 (1970)
- Hans Werner Henze
  - Serenade (1949)
  - Capriccio (for Paul Sacher) (1976/1981)
- Philippe Hersant
  - "Sarabande pour violoncelle" (2020) (written for Jennifer Kloetzel)
- Michael Hersch
  - Sonata No. 1 (1994)
  - Sonata No. 2 (2001)
- Kenneth Hesketh
  - Die hängende Figur ist Judas (Drei Perspektiven) (1998)
  - IMMH (2014)
- Jacques Hétu
  - Variations, Op. 11b (1967)
- Gilad Hochman
  - Rhapsody (2003)
  - Ponderings on a Memory (2005)
- Jennifer Higdon
  - Suite (2002)
- Paul Hindemith
  - Sonata, Op. 25, No. 3 (1923)
- Joel Hoffman
  - Concert-Study (Fantasie) (1977)
  - unaccompanied minor (2007)
- Robin Hoffmann
  - Schleifers Methoden für Violoncello solo (2005)
- York Höller
  - Sonata (1968)
- Heinz Holliger
  - Chaconne (for Paul Sacher) (1975)
  - Trema (1981)
- Vagn Holmboe
  - Solo Cello Sonata, M. 241 (1968–69)
- Imogen Holst
  - Fall of the Leaf
- Joaquim Homs
  - Arbres al vent (1992)
  - Soliloqui num. 4 (1994)
  - Capvespre vora el mar (1994)
- Arthur Honegger
  - Paduana in G major, H.181 (1945)
- Michael Hoppé and Martin Tillmann
  - Solo Cello Characteristics
- Alan Hovhaness
  - Yakamochi, Op. 193 (1965)
- Edgar Hovhanessian (Oganesyan)
  - Sonata for solo cello (1970)
- Klaus Huber
  - Transpositio ad Infinitum für ein virtuoses Solocello (for Paul Sacher)
- Nicolaus A. Huber
  - Der Ausrufer steigt ins Innere (1984)
- Tobias Hume
  - Kleine Stücke für Cello solo (Small pieces ) Book 1 (originally for Gamba) (arranged by Sabina Lehrmann)
  - (Cello solo pieces) Book 2
- Bertold Hummel
  - Fantasia I in G, Op. 77d1 (1952)
  - Fantasia II in memoriam Pablo Casals, Op. 97a (1993)
  - Farewell (2002)

== I ==
- Jacques Ibert
  - Etude-Caprice pour un tombeau de Chopin (1949)
  - Ghirlarzana (1950)
- Yoshirō Irino (1921–1980)
  - Three Movements (1969)
- Airat Ichmouratov (1973)
  - Praeludium in G Major for Cello Solo, Op. 69 (2021)

== J ==
- Karl Jenkins
  - Benedictus - The Armed Man (2001)
- Jan Jirásek
  - Dilema (1987)
- Ben Johnston
  - Toccata for Laurien Laufman (1984)
- Betsy Jolas
  - Scion (1974)
  - Episode cinquième (1983)
- Andre Jolivet
  - Suite en Concert (1965)
- Christian Jost
  - Laulos (2005)
- Gordon Jacob
  - Serenade
  - Divertimento
- Jurgis Juozapaitis
  - Sonata for solo cello

== K ==
- Dmitry Kabalevsky
  - Études in Major and Minor, Op. 68 (1961)
- Mauricio Kagel
  - Siegfriedp‘ (1971)
- Giya Kancheli
  - Having Wept for solo cello (1994)
- Nikolai Kapustin
  - Introduction and Scherzino for solo cello, Op. 93 (1999)
  - Suite for cello solo, Op. 124 (2004)
- Faradzh Karayev (aka Faraj Garayev)
  - Terminus for solo cello (1985)
- Hugo Kauder
  - Suite (1925)
  - Second Suite (1924)
- Frederick Kaufman
  - Inner Sanctum (1999)
- Tālivaldis Ķeniņš
  - Sonata for Cello Solo (1981)
- Jin Hi Kim
  - Kee Maek #4 (1995)
- Natalie Klouda
  - Suite for Solo Cello (2017, revised 2019)
- Volker David Kirchner
  - Und Salomo sprach (‘’And Salomo spoke”) (1987)
  - Aus dem Buch der Konige 3 meditations (2000)
  - Threnos (written for the Feuermann Competition 2006)
- Aram Khachaturian
  - Sonata-Fantasy in C major, Op. 104 (1974)
- Adam Khudoyan
  - Sonata No. 1 (1961)
  - Sonata No. 2 Elegiac (1984)
  - Sonata No. 3 Pathetic (1993)
- Mark Kilstofte
  - You [unfolding] for solo cello (1996)
- Julius Klengel
  - Suite in D-minor, Op. 56
  - Caprice in the Form of a Chaconne (with free use of a Theme by Robert Schumann), Op. 43
- Alexander Knaifel
  - Lamento for solo cello (1967)
  - Capriccio for solo cello (1994)
- Zoltán Kodály
  - Solo Cello Sonata, Op. 8 (1915)
  - Capriccio (1915)
- Nikolai Korndorf
  - Passacaglia (1997)
- Irena Kosíková
  - Stopy (2004)
- Ernst Krenek
  - Suite, Op. 84 (1942)
- Hanna Kulenty
  - Sinequan: for violoncello (amplified and delay) (1993)
  - Still Life with a Cello (1998)
- György Kurtág
  - Pilinszky János: Gérard de Nerval (1986, for Zoltán Kocsis) for solo cello
  - 19 Jelek, játékok és üzenetek (Signs, Games and Messages) (1987–2008) for solo cello
  - Schatten (Shadows) (1999, for Miklós Perényi)
  - Az hit (Faith)
  - Hommage à John Cage, Elakadó szavak (Faltering Words) for solo cello
  - György Kroó in memoriam (1997) for solo cello
  - For Steven: In Memoriam Pauline Mara (2010), for solo cello
  - The Hilary Jig (to Hilary Behrens 90) (2017, fellow-composer Márta Kurtag)
- Khristofer Kushnaryov ru:Кушнарёв, Христофор Степанович)
  - Sonata for solo cello (1932)
- Mati Kuulberg (fi:Mati Kuulberg)
  - Concerto-Sonata for solo cello (1973)

== L ==
- Sophie Lacaze
  - Variations sur quatre haikus (2009)
- Helmut Lachenmann
  - Pression (1970)
- Ezra Laderman
  - Partita (1972)
  - A Single Voice (1995, written for Tanya Anisimova)
  - Fantasy (1998)
  - A Single Line (2004)
- Frank La Rocca
  - Secret Thoughts (1986)
- Henri Lazarof
  - Momenti (1987)
- Claude Ledoux
  - Le Songe trouble de l'orchidee (1994)
  - 12 Studies - First book (1994)
- Benjamin Lees
  - Night Spectres (2000)
- Kenneth Leighton
  - Sonata, Op. 52 (1967)
- Marian Lejava
  - Adieu (2008)
- Tania Leon
  - 4 Pieces (1981)
- Milcho Leviev
  - Reflected Meditation (1980)
  - Augsburg Polka (1998)
- György Ligeti
  - Sonata (1948–1953)
- Magnus Lindberg
  - Stroke (1984)
  - Partia (2001)
- Franz Liszt
  - Sonata in B minor for solo cello (transcription by Johann Sebastian Paetsch)
- Jerry Liu
  - Suite 7 Days (2012)
  - Calor (2016)
- Vassily Lobanov
  - Sonata for solo cello (1963)
  - Fantasie, Op. 48 (1987)
- Pietro Locatelli
  - Il Laberinto Armonico (transcription by Rohan de Saram)
- Alvin Lucier
  - Indian Summer (1993)
- Witold Lutosławski
  - Sacher Variation (1975; for Paul Sacher)

== M ==
- Peter Machajdík
  - Ponor (2019)
  - Wolds (2019)
  - Lullaby (1999)
- Olga Magidenko
  - Site of the Heart, Op. 60 (1998)
- Enrico Mainardi
  - Sonata breve (1942)
  - Sonata (1959)
- Ivo Malec
  - Arco-1 (1987)
- Vitold Malishevsky
  - Suite
- Benedetto Marcello
  - Cello sonatas
- Andrew March
  - Three Pieces for Solo Cello (2011)
- Ljubica Marić
  - Monodia Octoïca for solo cello
- Steven Harry Markowitz
  - Impromptu
  - A Brief Adventure
- Pamela J. Marshall
  - Soliloquy
- Donald Martino
  - Parisonatina Al’Dodecafonia (1964)
- Tauno Marttinen
  - Impression, Op. 140 (1978)
- Colin Matthews
  - Palinode (1992)
- David Matthews
  - Fantasia, Op. 8 (1971)
  - Songs and Dances of Mourning, Op. 12 (1976)
  - Journeying Songs, Op. 95 (2004)
- Rudolf Matz
  - 11 Caprices
  - Ombres et lumières (Lights and Shadows)
  - Suite in C major
  - Tema con Variazioni
- Toshiro Mayuzumi
  - Bunraku (1960)
- John McCabe
  - Partita (1966)
- Alfred Mendelssohn
  - Suite (1960)
- Usko Meriläinen
  - Arabesques (1964)
- Krzysztof Meyer
  - Sonata (1964)
  - Moment musical (1976)
  - Monologue (1990)
- Peter Mieg
  - La sombre (1971)
  - L'aérienne (1975)
- Eric Moe
  - The Lone Cello (1998) for 'cello solo
- Robert Moevs
  - Heptachronon (1969)
- Alan Mills
  - Song & Dance for solo cello (2007)
- Roberto Molinelli
  - Crystalligence (commissioned by Enrico Dindo) (2005)
- Dexter Morrill
  - Fantasy (1995)
- Robert Muczynski
  - Gallery: Suite (on paintings of Charles Burchfield) (1966)
- Isabel Mundry
  - Komposition (1992/93)
  - Komposition (1997)

== N ==
- Florie Namir
  - Rolling, fantasia for cello solo (2004)
- Lior Navok
  - Fantasy (1998)
- Arkady Nesterov
  - Sonata for solo cello
- Joaquin Nin-Culmell
  - Suite
- Akira Nishimura
  - Threnody (1998)
- Arne Nordheim
  - Clamavi (1980)

== O ==
- Mark O'Connor
  - Appalachia Waltz (composer's own transcription of original version for solo violin)
- Mikhail Osokin
  - Sonata for solo cello
- Terry Winter Owens
  - Cellestial Music, Book 1 (2003)

== P ==
- Younghi Pagh-Paan
  - AA-GA I (1984)
- Hilda Paredes
  - Zuhuy Kak (1997)
- Cicely Parnas
  - 'Short Story' Suite for Solo Cello (2025) (written for Jennifer Kloetzel)
- Robert Parris
  - Fantasy and Fugue (1954)
- Boris Parsadanjan
  - Sonata for solo cello (1973)
- Paul Patterson
  - Suite, Op. 62
- Sergei Pavlenko
  - Sonata for solo cello (1983)
- Krzysztof Penderecki
  - Capriccio per Siegfried Palm (1968)
  - Per Slava (1986)
  - Suite for Solo Cello (2013) [Expanded version of previously published "Divertimento"]
- George Perle
  - Cello Sonata (1947)
  - Hebrew Melodies
- Vincent Persichetti
  - Solo Cello Sonata, Op. 54
- Sven Holger Philippsen
  - Cellosolosonate Nr.1 in 4 Sätzen (1988)

Praeludium - Vivace e con fuoco
Élégie (Adagio con affetto)
Rondo vivacissimo

- Carlo Alfredo Piatti
  - Capriccio on the cavatina "I tuoi frequenti palpiti" from ‘’Niobe’’ by Giovanni Pacini, Op. 22
  - 12 Caprices, Op. 25
  1. In G minor: Allegro quasi presto
  2. In E♭ major: Andante religioso
  3. In B♭ major: Moderato
  4. In D minor: Allegretto
  5. In F major: Allegro comodo
  6. In A♭ major: Adagio largamente
  7. In C major: Maestoso
  8. In A minor: Moderato ma energico
  9. In D major: Allegro
  10. In B minor: Allegro deciso
  11. In G major: Adagio. Allegro
  12. In E minor: Allegretto
- Gregor Piatigorsky
  - Syrinx
  - A Stroll
- Ástor Piazzolla
  - 6 Tango Etudes (arr. Karttunen)
- Wolfgang Plagge
  - Jakobsstigen, Op. 20: Fantasy (1983)
  - Music , Op. 54 (1990)
- Peteris Plakidis
  - Two Variations for solo cello (1976)
- Robert H.P. Platz
  - Senko-hana-bi (In Yoshitake's garden) (1997–2000)
- Conrad Pope
  - Sonata for Violoncello alone (1972)
- Gerhard Präsent
  - A Rayas for violoncello solo (2001–02)
- Sergei Prokofiev
  - Solo Cello Sonata, Op. 133 (1953) (unfinished; completed by Blok in 1996)
  - March from Music for Children, Op. 65 - (ed. Piatigorsky)

== R ==
- Nikolai Rakov
  - Waltz for solo cello
- Shulamit Ran
  - Fantasy Variations (2003)
- Alexander Raskatov
  - Dramatic Games for solo cello (1979)
  - Kyrie Eleison (1992)
- Einojuhani Rautavaara
  - Sonata, Op. 46 (1969)
- Max Reger
  - 3 Suites, Op. 131c (1914)
    - Suite No. 1 in G major
    - Suite No. 2 in D minor
    - Suite No. 3 in A minor
- Aribert Reimann
  - Solo II (1981)
- Phillip Rhodes
  - Three Pieces
- Alan Ridout
  - Partita (1959)
- Wolfgang Rihm
  - Great (1972)
- Joaquin Rodrigo
  - Como una fantasía (1979)
- Scott Roller
  - Mutamusic (1983)
- Bernhard Romberg
  - Sonata in E minor Op. 38 No. 1
  - Sonata in G major Op. 38 No. 2
- Lucia Ronchetti
  - Forward and downward, turning neither to the left nor to the right (2017)
- Ned Rorem
  - After Reading Shakespeare Nine movements alone (written for Sharon Robinson; 1980)
- Hilding Rosenberg
  - Intermezzo (1974)
- Miklos Rozsa
  - Toccata capricciosa, Op. 36 (1979; in memory of Piatigorsky)
- Edmund Rubbra
  - Improvisation, Op. 124 (pub. 1967)
- Elena Ruehr
  - Lift (2013) for solo cello, premiered at MIT (written for Jennifer Kloetzel)
  - Cricket the Fiddler (2020), commissioned by Jennifer Kloetzel, solo cello, premiered online October 2020, ca 8’
  - Cloud Forest (2015) solo cello, 8 minutes, commissioned by Rhonda Rider
- Peter Ruzicka
  - Sonata, Op. 9 (1969)
  - Stille Four Epilogues (1976)

== S ==
- Kaija Saariaho
  - Petals (1988)
  - Près (1992)
  - Spins & Spells (1997)
  - Sept Papillons (2000)
- Aulis Sallinen
  - Elegy for Sebastian Knight, Op. 10 (1964)
  - Sonata, Op. 26 (1971)
- Vadim Salmanov
  - Monologue for solo cello (1970)
- Esa-Pekka Salonen
  - Yta III (1987)
- Timothy Salter
  - Scintilla for solo cello (2003)
- David Sampson
  - Three Arguments for unaccompanied cello (1993)
- Ruben Sarkisjan
  - Cercio Ceclamando (Cycle of Declamations) for solo cello (2001)
- Ahmed Adnan Saygun
  - Partita, Op. 31 (1954)
- Robert Saxton
  - Sonata on a Theme of Sir William Walton (1999)
- Giacinto Scelsi
  - Triphon (1956)
  - Trilogie (1957/65)
  - Voyages (1985)
  - Maknongan (1976)
- Gerhard Schedl
  - Aus Zwei Stücke aus der Schatz-Truhe
- Peter Schickele (P. D. Q. Bach)
  - Vermillion Suite (1987)
  - Suite No. 1 All By Its Lonesome
  - Suite No. 2 All By Its Lonesome
- Josef Schillinger
  - Dance Suite for solo cello, Op.20 (1928)
- Thomas Daniel Schlee
  - Three Signs, Op. 53 (2002)
- Friedemann Schmidt-Mechau
  - Aposiopesis Music for violoncello (1990)
  - Morgenlachen (Morning Laughter) Music for violoncello (1997)
  - Fehlversteck (Flawed Hide-Out) Five musical sketches for a cellist (2007)
  - Ent-Gegnung (Re-Tort) music for cello (2020)
- Artur Schnabel (1882–1951)
  - Sonata (in four movements) (1931)
- Alfred Schnittke
  - Klingende Buchstaben (Sounding Letters) (1988)
  - Madrigal in Memoriam Oleg Kagan (1990)
  - Improvisation (1993)
- Franz Schubert
  - Erlkönig - Le Roi des Aulnes (The Erlking or Elf King; adapted in 1890 by Bernhard Cossmann
- Gunther Schuller
  - Fantasy, Op. 19 (1960)
- Laura Schwendinger
  - All the Pretty Horses (2009)
  - Primavera Trasformata(2020)
- Salvatore Sciarrino
  - Due Studi (1947)
  - Ai Limiti Della Notte (1984)
- Peter Sculthorpe
  - Requiem (1979)
  - Threnody (In memory of Stuart Challender) (1991)
  - Into the Dreaming (1993)
  - Tailitnama Song (1997)
- Roger Sessions
  - Six Pieces (1966)
- Rodion Shchedrin
  - Russian Tunes (Russkie Naigryshi), Op. 79 (1990)
- Alexander Shchetynsky
  - Sonata (2001)
  - Gebrauchsmusik 3 (2025)
- Bright Sheng
  - Diu Diu Dong (Seven Tunes Heard in China) (1995)
- Makoto Shinohara
  - Evolution (1986–90)
- Jean Sibelius
  - Theme and Variations in D minor (written in 1887, discovered in 1995)
- Sergei Slonimsky
  - 3 Pieces for solo cello (1964)
- Haskell Small
  - Suite
- Dmitry Smirnov
  - Monogram, Op. 58A (1990)
  - Elegy in memory of Edison Denisov, Op. 97a (1997)
  - Family Portrait, Op. 108 (1998)
  - Postlude in memory of Alfred Schnittke, Op. 112A (2000)
  - Bagatelle, Op. 128A (2001)
  - Saga to S.A. Gubaidulina, Op. 130 (2001)
- Naresh Sohal
  - Monody (1976)
  - Shades III
  - Shades IV (1983)
- Giovanni Sollima
  - La luna (1986)
  - 6 Caprices (1987)
  - Segno (1992)
  - Anno uno (1993)
  - The Songlines (1993)
  - Lamentatio (1998)
  - Pasolini fragments (1998)
  - Alone (1999)
- Halsey Stevens
  - Sonata (five movements - Introduction, Ciaccona, Scherzo, Notturno, Finale) (1958)
- Peter Vukmirovic Stevens
  - August Ruins (2010)
  - Tempus Edax Rerum (2011)
  - Etude for Raising the Dead (2011)
  - Versatile Hammers (2011)
  - Thunder, Perfect Mind (2012)
- Mark Summer
  - Julie-O
  - Lo, How a Rose E'er Blooming
  - Kablimba (all pizzicato)
- Viktor Suslin
  - Chanson contre raison Sonata (1984)
  - Schatz-insel (1990)
- Randall Svane
  - Suite No. 1 (1979)
  - Suite No. 2 (1982)
  - Suite No. 3 (1988)
- Takehiko Sueoka
  - Cello Sonata Unaccompanied (1997)

== T ==
- Emil Tabakov
  - Bis (1982)
- Josef Tal
  - Suite for cello (1937)
  - Sonata for cello (1937)
  - Treatise for cello (1973)
  - In Memoriam of a Dear Friend for cello (1985)
- Giuseppe Tartini
  - L'Arte dell'Arco (The Art of the Bow) 50 variations on Corelli's Gavotte from Op.5, No.10 (1758) (transcribed by Paul Bazelaire)
- John Tavener
  - Thrinos (1990)
  - Chant (1995)
- Boris Tchaikovsky
  - Suite (in six movements) (1946)
  - Suite in five movements (1960)
- Alexander Tcherepnin
  - Suite, Op. 76 (1946)
- James Tenney
  - Cellogram for Joel Krosnick (1971)
- Dimitri Terzakis
  - Omega 1 (1978)
  - Dialog der Seele mit ihrem Schatten (1991; for Siegfried Palm)
- Augusta Read Thomas
  - Spring Song (1995)
- Jukka Tiensuu
  - Balzo
- Ton That Tiet
  - Bois terre
- Boris Tishchenko
  - Sonata No. 1, Op. 18 (1960)
  - Sonata No. 2, Op. 76 (1979)
- Ernst Toch
  - Impromptu in three movements, Op. 90c (1963)
  - Glosa (2004)
- Javier Torres Maldonado
  - Tiento (2000; also version for cello and electronics, 2003)
- Paul Tortelier
  - Suite in D minor (1944)
- Donald Tovey
  - Solo Cello Sonata in D, Op. 50
- Sulkhan Tsintsadze
  - Chonguri (Tchonguri) (1978)
  - Sonata (1975)

== U ==
- Chinary Ung
  - Kshe Buon (1981)

== V ==
- Fabio Vacchi
  - In alba mia, dir... (1995)
- Johanna Varner
  - The Windmill, MCV 2001 (2019)
- Pēteris Vasks
  - Gramata cellam (Das Buch) (1978)
- Sándor Veress
  - Sonata (1935)
- Carl Vine
  - Inner World (1994)
- Param Vir
  - Flame (1997)
- Giovanni Battista Vitali
  - Partite per il Violone (1680)
  - Partita sopra diverse Sonate
- Antonio Vivaldi
  - Cello Sonatas RV 38-47 (c. 1720-1730)
- Vladimir Vlasov
  - Ballade for solo cello
  - Improvisation for solo cello
- Wladimir Vogel
  - Poeme (1974)

== W ==
- Wolfram Wagner
  - Sonata, Op. 31 (1990)
- Gwyneth Walker
  - In Memoriam (1980)
- William Walton
  - Passacaglia (1980)
- Rodney Waschka II
  - Ravel Remembers Fascism (1991)
- Graham Waterhouse
  - Three Pieces for Solo Cello, Op. 28 (1992)
  - Threnody (2002)
  - in nomine for cello solo (2013)
  - Variations for Cello Solo (2019)
  - Eleven Smithereens (2021)
- Ben Weber
  - Dance, Op. 28 (1948)
  - Dance, Op. 31 (1949)
- Mieczysław Weinberg (or Vainberg)
  - Solo Cello Sonata No. 1, Op. 72 (1960)
  - Solo Cello Sonata No. 2, Op. 86 (1965)
  - Solo Cello Sonata No. 3, Op. 106 (1971)
  - Solo Cello Sonata No. 4, Op. 140 (1986)
  - Twenty-four Preludes, Op. 100 (1968)
- Egon Wellesz
  - Cello Sonata, Op. 31 (1920)
  - Suite op. 39 (1924)
- Richard Wernick
  - Suite No. 1 (2003)
  - Suite No. 2 (2007)
- David Wilde
  - The Cellist of Sarajevo - A Lament in Rondo Form, Op. 12
- Adrian Williams
  - Solo Cello Sonata (1976–77)
- John Williams
  - Three Pieces (2001)
- Richard Edward Wilson
  - Lord Chesterfield to his Son (1987)
  - Music (1971)
- Stefan Wolpe
  - Piece Alone (1966)
- William Wordsworth
  - Sonata for Violoncello (1961)
- Charles Wuorinen
  - Cello Variations I to Fred Sherry (1970)
  - Cello Variations II (1975)
  - Cello Variations III (1997)

== X ==
- Iannis Xenakis
  - Kottos (1977)
  - Nomos Alpha (1966)

== Y ==
- James Yannatos
  - Sonata
- Yehuda Yannay
  - I can't fathom it... and projections (1993)
  - Tangoul Morṭii (Tango of Death) (1997)
- Eugène Ysaÿe
  - Cello Sonata, Op. 28 (1924)
- Isang Yun
  - Glissées (1970) for Siegfried Palm
  - Seven Etudes (1993)
- Ludmilla Yurina
  - Irrlicht for solo cello (2000)
- Iraida Yusupova
  - Dreams' Music for solo cello (1990)

== Z ==
- Edson Zampronha
  - Elegia and electroacoustics (2009)
  - Two Takes (2008)
  - Toccata (1989)
- Bernd Alois Zimmermann
  - Sonata (1959–60)
  - Short Studies (4) (1970)
- Sergei Zhukov
  - Sonata-Capriccio for solo cello (1980)
  - Paraphrase on van Eyck's poem De Tuinman en de Dood for solo cello (2003)
- Vassily Zverev
  - Sonata-Fantasy for solo cello

== See also ==
- String instrument repertoire
- List of double concertos for violin and cello
- List of triple concertos for violin, cello, and piano
- List of compositions for cello and piano
- Cello sonata
