= List of compositions for cello and organ =

This is a compilation of pieces for cello and pipe organ. See also the entries on cello and the List of compositions for cello and orchestra, List of compositions for cello and piano and List of solo cello pieces.

Ordering is by surname of composer.

== A ==
- Thomas Åberg
  - Fantaisie in A minor
  - Svensk bröllopsmusik (Swedish Wedding Music)
- Julian Anderson
  - Chants (2025)

== B ==
- Johann Sebastian Bach
  - Adagio in C minor, from Toccata, Adagio and Fugue, BWV 564 (trans. Nikolaus Maler)
  - Adagio, from Violin Concerto no. 2, BWV 1042 (arr. J. Harnoy)
  - Air, from Suite in D major (trans. Ernst-Thilo Kalke)
  - Arioso, from Cantata no. 156 (arr. M.J.Isaac)
  - Six Schübler Chorales, BWV 645-650 (trans. Raphael Wallfisch and Colm Carey)
- Siegfried Barchet
  - Schmerzliches Adagio für Violoncello und Orgel
- Alfred Baum
  - Introduktion und Variationen (Carus-Verlag)
  - Invocation (Carus-Verlag)
- Ludwig van Beethoven
  - Marcia funèbre, from Symphony No 3 (trans. Ernst-Thilo Kalke)
- Herman Berlinski
  - Days of Awe
  - Hassidic Suite
  - Kol nidre
  - Sinfonia No 10 in A minor for cello and organ
- Neithard Bethke
  - Ludi organi, op. 58 no. 10, Weihnachtspastorale über "Quem pastores laudaverunt"
- Rudolf Bibl
  - Zwei Adagio, op. 30
- Lucien Blin
  - Recueillement
- Dirk Blockeel
  - "Ach Gott vom Himmel sieh darein", Chorale en diminutio for cello and organ
  - "In paradisum" for cello and organ
  - "O gloriosa virginum" for cello and organ
  - Sonata for cello and organ
- Léon Boëllmann
  - Variations symphoniques for cello and organ
- Walther Böhme
  - Two Pieces for cello and organ, op. 15
- Émile Bourdon
  - Andantino religioso op. 15
- Max Bruch
  - Kol Nidrei, op. 47
- Ole Borneman Bull
  - Säterjäntans söndag (Säter girl's Sunday)

== C ==
- Pablo Casals
  - Cant dels Ocells (Song of the Birds)
- Frédéric Chopin
  - Trauermarsch, from the Piano Sonata, op. 35 (trans. Ernst-Thilo Kalke)
- Arcangelo Corelli
  - Adagio, from Sonata, op. 5 no. 5 (trans. J Schuster)
  - Sonata, op. 5 no. 8 (trans. A. Salmon and J. Lindner)
- Chaya Czernowin
  - Gradual Edge (2011)

== D ==
- Willem de Fesch
  - 6 Sonatas for cello and basso continuo, op. 8
- Marcel Dupré
  - Sonata for cello and organ, op. 60

== E ==
- Edward Elgar
  - Une Idylle for cello and organ, op. 4 no. 1

== F ==
- Gabriel Fauré
  - Andante
  - Après un Rêve (trans. Pablo Casals)
- Carl August Fischer
  - Consolation
- César Franck
  - Andantino

== G ==
- Herbert Gadsch
  - Concertino "In dich hab' ich gehoffet, Herr" for cello and organ
- Zsolt Gárdonyi
  - Variations on a Hungarian Chorale
- Lothar Graap
  - "Befiehl du deine Wege", Variations for cello and organ
  - "Hinunter ist der Sonne Schein", Chorale suite for cello and organ
- Percy Grainger
  - The Nightingale
- Sofia Gubaidulina
  - In Croce
- René Guillou
  - Adagio "Hommage à J.S. Bach"
- Max Gulbins
  - Vier kleine Stücke, op. 14 for cello and organ

== H ==
- Calvin Hampton
  - Prelude for Easter Day
  - Processions through a Black Hole
- George Frideric Handel
  - Adagio, from Suite no. 2 in F major (trans. Ernst-Thilo Kalke)
- Joseph Haydn
  - St Antoni Chorale (trans. Ernst-Thilo Kalke)
- Russell Hepplewhite
- Smoke Signals
- Invisible Landscapes
- Karl Höller
  - Improvisation über "Schönster Herr Jesu", op. 55
  - Partita über den Choral "O wie selig seid ihr doch, ihr Frommen" op. 1

== J ==
- Betsy Jolas
  - Musique d'autres jours (2020)
  - This is love (Chère Kaija) (2024)
- John Paul Jones
  - The Call (2025)
- Joseph Jongen
  - Humoresque, op. 92

== K ==
- Ernst-Thilo Kalke
  - Consolation
  - Es kommt die Nacht
  - Ich hatt' einen Kameraden
  - Letzter Abschied
- Artur Kapp
  - Andante religioso
- Georg Kestler
  - Nenia for cello and organ (or harmonium)
- Fürchtegott Theodor Kirchner
  - 2 Tonstücke für Violoncello und Orgel, op. 92
- Erland von Koch
  - Folklig marsch (Popular march) no. 2
- Bernhard Kroll
  - Partita über "Lucis creator", op. 148

== L ==
- Torsten Laux
  - Schalom for cello and organ
- George Lewis
  - Différance (2025)
- Magnus Lindberg
  - Voie (2025)
- Oskar Lindberg
  - Gammal fäbodpsalm från Dalarna (Old pasture hymn from Dalarna)
- Wolfgang Lindner
  - Largo e spiccato for cello and organ

== M ==
- Frederik Magle
  - Sonata for cello and organ "From the earth"
- Peter Matthews
  - Four Seasons for cello and organ
- Tim McKenry
  - Relentless for Organ and 'Cello
- Gustav Adolf Merkel
  - Andacht
- Wolfgang Mitterer
  - Zugabe, Sortisatio, Histrio (1989)
- Wolfgang Amadeus Mozart
  - Ave verum corpus (trans. Ernst-Thilo Kalke)

== P ==
- Younghi Pagh-Paan
  - Augenblicke-Gebet (2013)
- Tadeusz Paciorkiewicz
  - Andante calmato
- Craig Phillips
  - A Song Without Words
- Daniel Pinkham
  - Oration

== R ==
- Joseph Joachim Raff
  - Cavatina
- Günter Raphael
  - Partita über den Choral "Ach Gott, vom Himmel sieh darein", op. 22 no. 1
  - Sonata for cello and organ, op. 36
- Max Reger
  - Aria, from Suite for violin and piano in A major, Op. 103a
- Josef Rheinberger
  - Abendlied, No. 3 from Geistliche Gesänge, Op. 69 (originally for choir SSATTB)
  - 3 Pièces, from 6 Pièces for violin and organ, op. 150
- Dominique Rivolta
  - Mélodie transmutée
- Daniel Roth
  - Artizarra, Fantaisie sur un chant populaire basque
- Rainer Maria Rückschloss
  - ...in langer Nacht

== S ==
- Kaija Saariaho
  - Offrande pour orgue et violoncelle
- Camille Saint-Saëns
  - Prière, op. 158
- Timothy Salter
  - Vitis flexuosa
- Hans-Ludwig Schilling
  - Fantasia riservata
- Hermann Schröder
  - Salve Regina: cantilena choralis for cello and organ
- Franz Schubert
  - Ave Maria (trans. Ernst-Thilo Kalke)
- Joschi Schumann
  - Sudden lightning
  - The hell, what a funky prayer
- Mikhail Shukh
  - Ave Maria, for cello and organ
- Robert Sirota
  - Easter Canticles
- Heimer Sjöblom
  - Liten svit i spelmanston (Little suite of folk melodies), op. 36
- Wolfgang Stockmeier
  - Variations on a Theme of Franz Liszt "The Way of the Cross"
- Alan Stout
  - Serenity, op. 11
- Lisa Streich
  - SERAPH (2013)
- Joseph Suder
  - Ariette for cello and organ

== T ==
- Eino Tamberg
  - A play with a big drum, op. 136
- Outi Tarkiainen
  - Majakka (2025)
- Jukka Tiensuu
  - Loistoon (2025)
- Ernst Otto Toller
  - Drei Stücke for cello and organ (or harmonium), op. 130
- Trad.
  - Deep river (trans. Ernst-Thilo Kalke)
  - Sometimes I feel like a motherless child (trans. Ernst-Thilo Kalke)
- Helena Tulve
  - I touched her shadow when the light delayed (2025)

== V ==
- Pēteris Vasks
  - Musique du Soir pour Violoncelle et Orgue

== W ==
- Lotta Wennäkoski
  - Signes (2025)
- Oskar Wermann
  - Sonata for cello and organ, op. 58
- Johannes Weyrauch
  - Sonate über den Choral "Herzliebster Jesu, was hast du verbrochen"
- Kurt Wiklander
  - Fantasia for cello and organ, op. 5

== See also ==
- Cello sonata
- String instrument repertoire
- List of solo cello pieces
- List of compositions for cello and orchestra
- List of compositions for cello and piano
- Double concerto for violin and cello
- Triple concertos for violin, cello, and piano and Orchestra
