= Sonata for Solo Cello =

Sonata for Solo Cello may refer to:

- Sonata for Solo Cello (Crumb)
- Sonata for Solo Cello (Kodály)
- Sonata for Solo Cello (Ligeti)
