= Cello sonata =

Composition in sonata form for cello

Franz Schubert's Arpeggione Sonata
I. Allegro moderato
Performed in a transcription for cello and piano by Hans Goldstein (cello) and Clinton Adams (piano)

A cello sonata is a musical composition in sonata form, often with the instrumentation of a cello taking solo role with piano accompaniment. Some of the earliest cello sonatas were composed in the 18th century by Francesco Geminiani and Antonio Vivaldi; subsequent famous cello sonatas include those by Ludwig van Beethoven, Felix Mendelssohn, Frédéric Chopin, Johannes Brahms, Richard Strauss, Sergei Rachmaninoff, and Claude Debussy.

The following list contains cello sonatas with or without accompanying instruments. See the See also list for more comprehensive lists divided up into solo and accompanied works.

== List of major cello sonatas ==
- Charles-Valentin Alkan
  - Sonate de Concert, Op. 47 (c. 1857)
- Samuel Barber
  - Cello Sonata in C minor, Op. 6 (1932)
- Arnold Bax
  - Cello Sonata (1923)
  - Cello Sonatina (1933)
  - Legend-Sonata (1943)
- Ludwig van Beethoven
  - Cello Sonata No. 1 in F major, Op. 5/1 (1796)
  - Cello Sonata No. 2 in G minor, Op. 5/2 (1796)
  - Cello Sonata No. 3 in A major, Op. 69 (1808)
  - Cello Sonata No. 4 in C major, Op. 102/1 (1815)
  - Cello Sonata No. 5 in D major, Op. 102/2 (1815)
- Easley Blackwood Jr.
  - Cello Sonata, Op. 31
- Johannes Brahms
  - Cello Sonata No. 1 in E minor, Op. 38 (1862–65)
  - Cello Sonata No. 2 in F major, Op. 99 (1886)
  - Violin Sonata No. 1 in G major, "Rain", Op. 78 (1878–79), transcribed for cello by Paul Klengel
  - Violin Sonata No. 2 in A major, Op. 100 (1886), transcribed for cello by Laszlo Varga
  - Violin Sonata No. 3 in D minor, Op. 108 (1886–88), transcribed for cello by Laszlo Varga
- Frank Bridge
  - Cello sonata in D minor, H. (Hindmarsh) 125 (1913–17)
- Benjamin Britten
  - Sonata in C for Cello and Piano, Op. 65 (1961)
- Elliott Carter
  - Cello Sonata (1948)
- Frédéric Chopin
  - Cello Sonata in G minor, Op. 65 (1845–46)
- George Crumb
  - Sonata for Solo Cello (1955)
- Claude Debussy
  - Cello Sonata in D minor (1915)
- Frederick Delius
  - Cello Sonata (1916)
- Felix Draeseke
  - Cello Sonata in D major, Op. 51 (1890)
- Antonín Dvořák
  - Cello Sonata in F major (1871); lost (cello part extant)
- George Enescu
  - Cello Sonata in F minor, Op. 26/1 (1898)
  - Cello sonata in C major, Op. 26/2 (1935)
- Heitor Villa-Lobos
  - Cello Sonata No. 2, W103 (1916)
- Gabriel Fauré
  - Cello Sonata No. 1 in D minor, Op. 109 (1917)
  - Cello Sonata No. 2 in G minor, Op. 117 (1921)
- César Franck
  - Violin Sonata in A major, transcribed with the composer's approval for cello by Jules Delsart. See
- John Foulds
  - Cello Sonata (1905, rev. 1927)
- François Francoeur (attrib.)
  - Sonata for Cello and Piano in E major (actually a cello arrangement of a Louis Francoeur violin sonata)
- Peter Racine Fricker
  - Cello Sonata (1956)
- Zoltán Gárdonyi
  - Cello Sonata (1944)
- Edvard Grieg
  - Cello Sonata in A minor, Op. 36 (1883)
- Paul Hindemith
  - Cello Sonata, Op. 11/3 (1919)
  - Sonata for Cello Solo, Op. 25/3 (1923)
  - Cello Sonata (1948)
- Vagn Holmboe
  - Sonata for Solo Cello, Op. 101 (1968–69)
- Arthur Honegger
  - Cello Sonata in D minor, H.32 (1920)
- Stephen Hough
  - Sonata for Cello and Piano (left hand) (2014)
- Bertold Hummel
  - Cello Sonata in F major, Op. 2 (1950)
  - Sonata brevis, Op. 11a (1955)
- Johann Nepomuk Hummel
  - Sonata in A major, Op. 104
- John Ireland
  - Cello Sonata in G minor (1923)
- Giuseppe Maria Jacchini
  - Sonata No. 3 in C major (1697)
- Joseph Jongen
  - Cello Sonata in C minor, Op. 39 (1913)
- Dmitry Kabalevsky
  - Cello Sonata in B♭ major, Op. 71 (1962)
- Zoltán Kodály
  - Cello Sonata, Op. 4 (1907)
  - Sonata for Solo Cello, Op. 8 (1915)
  - Cello Sonatine (1923)
- Josef Labor
  - Cello Sonata in A major, Op. 7 (1896)
- Édouard Lalo
  - Cello Sonata in A minor (1856)
- Lowell Liebermann
  - Cello Sonata No. 1, Op. 3 (1978)
  - Cello Sonata No. 2, Op. 61 (1998)
  - Cello Sonata No. 3, Op. 90 (2005)
  - Cello Sonata No. 4, Op. 108 (2008)
- György Ligeti
  - Sonata for Solo Cello
- Albéric Magnard
  - Sonata for Cello in A, Op. 20 (1910)
- Bohuslav Martinů
  - Cello Sonata No. 1, H 277
  - Cello Sonata No. 2, H 286
  - Cello Sonata No. 3, H 340
- Felix Mendelssohn
  - Cello Sonata No. 1 in B♭ major, Op. 45 (1838)
  - Cello Sonata No. 2 in D major, Op. 58 (1842–43)
- Ignaz Moscheles
  - Cello Sonata, Op. 34 in B♭ major
  - Cello Sonata No. 2, Op. 121 in E major
- Georges Onslow
  - Cello Sonatas 1, 2 and 3, Op. 16/1–3 (1820)
- Henrique Oswald
  - Cello Sonata No. 1 in D minor, Op. 21 (1898)
  - Cello Sonata No. 2 in E♭ major, Op. 44 (1916)
- Hubert Parry
  - Cello Sonata in A major (1879–83)
- Giovanni Battista Pergolesi
  - Cello Sonata in F major (uncertain attribution)
- Francis Poulenc
  - Cello Sonata, FP 143 (1948)
- Sergei Prokofiev
  - Cello Sonata in C major, Op. 119 (1949)
  - Sonata for Solo Cello in C♯ minor, Op. 134 (unfinished)
- Sergei Rachmaninoff
  - Cello Sonata in G minor, Op. 19 (1901)
- Maurice Ravel
  - Sonata for Violin and Cello (1920–22)
- Max Reger
  - Cello Sonata No. 1 in F minor, Op. 5 (1892)
  - Cello Sonata No. 2 in G minor, Op. 28 (1898)
  - Cello Sonata No. 3 in F major, Op. 78 (1904)
  - Cello Sonata No. 4 in A minor, Op. 116 (1910)
- Edmund Rubbra
  - Cello Sonata in G minor, Op. 60 (1946)
- Camille Saint-Saëns
  - Cello Sonata No. 1 in C minor, Op. 32
  - Cello Sonata No. 2 in F major, Op. 123
- Philipp Scharwenka
  - Cello Sonata in G minor, Op. 116
- Alfred Schnittke
  - Cello Sonata No. 1 (1978)
  - Cello Sonata No. 2 (1993/4)
- Franz Schubert
  - Sonata for Arpeggione in A minor, D. 821 is often transcribed for cello.
- Dmitri Shostakovich
  - Cello Sonata in D minor, Op. 40 (1934)
  - Viola Sonata, Op. 147 (1975), transcribed for cello by Daniil Shafran
- Charles Villiers Stanford
  - Cello Sonata No. 1 in A major, Op. 9 (1878)
  - Cello Sonata No. 2 on D minor, Op. 39 (1893)
- Richard Strauss
  - Sonata in F major for cello and piano (1882)
- Antonio Vivaldi
  - At least 9 cello sonatas
- Kurt Weill
  - Sonata for Cello and Piano (1920)

== Chronology of major cello sonatas ==
The following list (inevitably incomplete) tries to place the major sonatas and equivalent works for cello and piano or cello solo in chronological order of completion. It will be susceptible to uncertainty of dates, and whether original or revised versions are definitive.

Year	Composer	Work	Key	Opus
1696	Giuseppe Maria Jacchini	Sonata No. 3	C major	Op. 3
1717–23	Johann Sebastian Bach	6 Unaccompanied Cello Suites	G, D minor, C E♭, C minor & D	
early 18th century – 1739	Benedetto Marcello	At least 12 Cello Sonatas		
early 18th century – 1741	Antonio Vivaldi	At least 9 Cello Sonatas		
1760s–1805	Luigi Boccherini	At least 19 Cello Sonatas		
1796	Ludwig van Beethoven	Cello Sonata No. 1	F major	Op. 5, No. 1
1796	Ludwig van Beethoven	Cello Sonata No. 2	G minor	Op. 5, No. 2
1807–08	Ludwig van Beethoven	Cello Sonata No. 3	A major	Op. 69
1815	Ludwig van Beethoven	Cello Sonata No. 4	C major	Op. 102, No. 1
1815	Ludwig van Beethoven	Cello Sonata No. 5	D major	Op. 102, No. 2
1820	Georges Onslow	Cello Sonata No. 1	F major	Op. 16, No. 1
1820	Georges Onslow	Cello Sonata No. 2	C minor	Op. 16, No. 2
1820	Georges Onslow	Cello Sonata No. 3	A major	Op. 16, No. 3
1838	Felix Mendelssohn	Cello Sonata No. 1	B♭ major	Op. 45
1842–43	Felix Mendelssohn	Cello Sonata No. 2	D major	Op. 58
1846	Frédéric Chopin	Cello Sonata	G minor	Op. 65
1856	Édouard Lalo	Cello Sonata	A minor	
1856	Charles-Valentin Alkan	Sonate de concert	E major	Op. 47
1862–65	Johannes Brahms	Cello Sonata No. 1	E minor	Op. 38
1872–73	Camille Saint-Saëns	Cello Sonata No. 1	C minor	Op. 32
1883	Edvard Grieg	Cello Sonata	A minor	Op. 36
1883	Richard Strauss	Cello Sonata	F major	Op. 6
1886	Johannes Brahms	Cello Sonata No. 2	F major	Op. 99
1892	Max Reger	Cello Sonata No. 1	F minor	Op. 5
1898	Max Reger	Cello Sonata No. 2	G minor	Op. 28
1899	Ernst von Dohnányi	Cello Sonata	B♭ major	Op. 8
1901	Sergei Rachmaninoff	Cello Sonata	G minor	Op. 19
1904	Max Reger	Cello Sonata No. 3	F major	Op. 78
1905	Camille Saint-Saëns	Cello Sonata No. 2	F major	Op. 123
1907	Zoltán Kodály	Cello Sonata		Op. 4
1907	Charles-Marie Widor	Cello Sonata	A major	Op. 80
1910	Max Reger	Cello Sonata No. 4	A minor	Op. 116
1910–11	Albéric Magnard	Cello Sonata	A major	Op. 20
1911	Nikolai Myaskovsky	Cello Sonata No. 1	D major	Op. 12
1912	Max Reger	Cello Suites 1, 2 and 3	G, D minor & A minor	Op. 131
1913	Dora Pejačević	Cello Sonata	E minor	Op. 35
1915	Claude Debussy	Cello Sonata	D minor	L. 135
1915	Zoltán Kodály	Solo Cello Sonata		Op. 8
1916	Frederick Delius	Cello Sonata	D minor	
1913–17	Frank Bridge	Cello Sonata	D minor	
1917	Gabriel Fauré	Cello Sonata No. 1	D minor	Op. 109
1921	Gabriel Fauré	Cello Sonata No. 2	G minor	Op. 117
1923	Paul Hindemith	Solo Sonata for Cello		Op. 25 No. 3
1923	John Ireland	Cello Sonata	G minor	
1929	Béla Bartók	Rhapsody for Cello and Piano		Sz 88
1932	Samuel Barber	Cello Sonata	C minor	Op. 6
1932–33	Igor Stravinsky	Suite Italienne for cello and piano		
1934	Dmitri Shostakovich	Cello Sonata	D minor	Op. 40
1938	Nikolai Myaskovsky	Cello Sonata No. 2		Op. 81
1939	Bohuslav Martinů	Cello Sonata No. 1		
1941	Bohuslav Martinů	Cello Sonata No. 2		
1944	Zoltán Gárdonyi	Cello Sonata		
1948	Francis Poulenc	Cello Sonata		Op. 143
1948	Elliott Carter	Cello Sonata		
1949	Sergei Prokofiev	Cello Sonata	C major	Op. 119
1949	Alan Rawsthorne	Cello Sonata		
1952	Bohuslav Martinů	Cello Sonata No. 3		
1956–57	Ernest Bloch	Cello Suites 1, 2 and 3		
1961	Benjamin Britten	Cello Sonata	C major	
1962	Dmitry Kabalevsky	Cello Sonata	B♭ major	Op. 71
1964	Benjamin Britten	Suite for Cello Solo No. 1	G major	Op. 72
1966	Karen Khachaturian	Cello Sonata		
1967	Benjamin Britten	Suite for Cello Solo No. 2	D major	Op. 80
1971	Benjamin Britten	Suite for Cello Solo No. 3		Op. 87
1978	Alfred Schnittke	Cello Sonata		

== See also ==
- List of compositions for cello and piano
- List of solo cello pieces
