= Op. 5 =

In music, Op. 5 stands for Opus number 5. Compositions that are assigned this number include:

- Barber – The School for Scandal
- Beach – Mass in E-flat
- Beethoven – Cello Sonatas Nos. 1 and 2
- Berlioz – Requiem
- Brahms – Piano Sonata No. 3
- Chausson – Viviane
- Chopin – Rondo à la mazur
- Corelli – Twelve Violin Sonatas, Op. 5
- Dvořák – Piano Quintet No. 1
- G. English – Symphony No. 2
- Glazunov – Symphony No. 1
- Gottschalk – Le Bananier
- Liszt – Rondeau fantastique sur un thème espagnol
- Nielsen – String Quartet No. 2
- Madetoja – Chess (Shakkipeli), theatre score for orchestra (1910)
- Rachmaninoff – Suite No. 1
- Reger – Cello Sonata No. 1
- Rimsky – Sadko
- Schoenberg – Pelleas und Melisande
- Schumann – Impromptus on a Theme by Clara Wieck
- Shostakovich – Three Fantastic Dances
- Sibelius – Six Impromptus, for solo piano (1893)
- Strauss – Gesellschafts-Walzer
- Stravinsky – Funeral Song
- Tamberg – Concerto Grosso
- Vivaldi – Six Violin Sonatas, Op. 5
