= Cello Sonata (Alkan) =

Sonata for cello and piano composed by John Foulds

Sonate de concert pour piano et violoncelle
- Cello sonata by Charles-Valentin Alkan
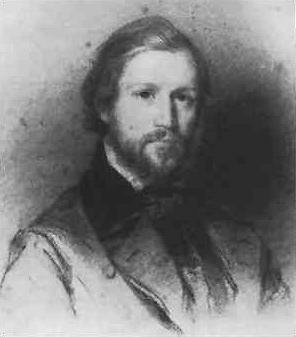
- The composer
- Key: E major
- Opus: 47
- Composed: 1856
- Dedication: James Odier
- Published: 1857
- Movements: 4

Charles-Valentin Alkan composed his Cello Sonata in Paris in 1856, titled Sonate de concert pour piano et violoncelle (Concert sonata for piano and cello), Op. 47. The work in E major is structured in four movements.

Alkan completed his cello sonata in 1856, as the dated manuscript shows. It was published in Paris in 1857, dedicated to James Odier. It was premiered with Alkan as the pianist. A reviewer of a performance in Paris in 1875 with Alkan at the piano noted its "wealth of melody" and an ovation by the audience. It was neglected during the twentieth century until a "mini Alkan-revival".

== Structure and music ==
The sonata is in four movements:

1. Allegro molto
2. Allegrettino
3. Adagio
4. Finale alla Saltarella: Prestissimo

It is the only one of Alkan's chamber works for which the composer provided metronome markings, although in performance the speeds prescribed are problematic.

The first movement, in sonata form, begins with passionate fervour, and is then reminiscent of the lyricism of the time's grand operas. In the development section, a "striding new theme" in C minor may have been inspired by a similar introduction in Beethoven's Eroica Symphony, and anticipates moves in compositions by Brahms.

The second movement begins with a simple siciliano theme, which "gradually becomes infected with slightly twisted 'wrong' notes, and even more peculiarly biting harmonies", sounding satirical and ironic. The third movement, Adagio, is accompanied in the score by a quote from the Book of Micah: "As dew from the Lord, as a shower upon the grass, that tarrieth not for man …". Alkan, who had attempted to translate the Old Testament, probably used his own French version. The music features a "heartfelt melody" in the cello's low range and "shimmering passages" of tremolando in the piano, which according to the music historian David Conway "recalls the inflections of the haftorah chant from the [Jewish] Sabbath service." It ends fading away in both instruments.

The finale is a dance described as "manic" and "furiously fast", in a sonata–rondo form. Saltarellas and tarantellas were fashionable in France at the time, for example in Auber’s opera La muette de Portici. According to legend, those bitten by a tarantula danced themselves to death in a frenzy, which Alkan's music seems to illustrate.

The sonata was regarded as "among the most difficult and ambitious in the romantic repertoire ... anticipating Mahler in its juxtaposition of the sublime and the trivial". The musicologist Brigitte François-Sappey noted in its four movements an anticipation of progressive tonality, each movement ascending by a major third.

== Versions ==
The work exists in a transcription for viola by Casimir Ney. Alkan himself also transcribed the last movement for piano duet.
