= Mass 2005 =

Cappella mass

Mass 2005 is a thirty-minute a cappella Mass setting composed by Randall Svane.

American composer Randall Svane composed his thirty-minute a cappella Mass setting from 2003-2005. It was first premiered by Schola Cantorum on Hudson under the direction of Deborah Simpkin King in 2006. Since its premiere in 2006, it has been performed most recently (August 17, 2008) in the Salzburg Dom, Salzburg, Austria. Excerpts from the Mass have also been performed (2008) by the Leipziger Vocal Ensemble under the direction of Philipp Amelung in the St. Thomaskirche, Leipzig, Germany.
