= Pirro Albergati =

Italian composer (1663–1735)

Count Pirro Capacelli Albergati (20 September 1663 – 22 June 1735) was an Italian aristocrat, and amateur composer.

Albergati was born in Bologna. The Albergatis were one of the most eminent families of the Bolognese nobility, and Count Pirro Albergati himself was ambassador, confidant of Leopold I, Emperor of Austria, member of the city Council of Elders, and gonfaloniere of the city of Bologna.

"Although posterity has recognized Pirro Albergati for his musical accomplishments, he was probably better known to the general public for his charitable works".(Victor Crowther The oratorio in Bologna 1650-1730)

From 1685, he became a member of the confraternity Santa Maria della Morte for whom he composed most of his 17 oratorios. From 1728, Albergati also held the mainly honorary post of maestro di cappella in Puiano near Urbino in the last years of his life. His sacred works include 4 masses.

Fellow Bolognese composer Giuseppe Maria Jacchini dedicated his opus 4 to Count Albergati in recognition of his strong support for giving Jacchini a permanent position in the orchestra of the cathedral of Bologna.

== Works ==
Published works:

- Op. 1 Balletti, correnti, sarabande e gighe per Violino, Violone, con il secondo violino beneplacito. 1682, reprinted 1685
- Op. 2 Suonate a due violini col suo basso continuo. Bologna 1683
- Op. 3 Cantate morali a voce solo, 1685
- Op. 4 Messa e salmi concertati. 1687
- Op. 5 "Plectro armonico" Dieci Sonate da Camera à due Violini, e Basso con Violoncello obligato (Bologna 1687)
- Op. 6 Cantate da camera a voce sola 1687
- Op. 7 Motetti e antifoni della B.M.V. 1691
- Op. 8 Concerti varii da Camera a tre, quattro o cinque. Modena 1702
- Op. 9 Cantate spirituale a 1 2 3 vv. F. Rosati Modena 1702
- Op. 10 Cantate ed Oratorio San Eustachio 1714
- [ ] Inno e antifone della B.M.V. a voce sola. Silvani, Bologna 1715
- [ ] Cantate in pregio di Santa Maria. "Op6." Bologna 1717
- Op. 13 Corona dei pregi di Maria a 1 voce 1717
- Op. 14 Caprici varii da camera a tre. Venice 1721
- Op. 15 Motetti con il responsorio di S. Antonio di Padova a 4, 1715
- Op. 16 Messe e Litanie della B.M.V. e Tantum ergo a 4, (Bologna ?) Venice 1721

Oratorios (surviving):

- L’innocenza di Sant’Eufemia 1694
- Il Convito di Baldassarro, 1691
- La Beata Caterina da Bologna tentata di solitudine, 1710 Bologna
- San Eustachio in Op.10 1714

Lost works:

- Serenata a 2 vv 1692
- Opera Gli amici 16 August 1699, Bologna
- Opera Il principe selvaggio 1712, Bologna

Oratorios:

- Nabucodonosor 1686
- Giobbe 1688
- Santa Orsola 1689
- L'Iride di pace, o sia il B. Niccolò Albergati 1690
- Il martirio di S Sinibaldo 1696
- Il ritorno dalla capanna 1696
- Maria Annunciata dall'Angelo 1701
- Santa Ottilia 1705
- Il Morte di Cristo 1719
- Il trionfo della Grazia, ovvero la conversione di Maddalena 1729
- S Petronio principale protettore di Bologna 1732

== Recordings ==
- Oratorio La Beata Caterina da Bologna tentata di solitudine. Magnificat. Cantate spirituali. Fortuna Ensemble, dir. Roberto Cascio TC.660101
- Oratorio Il Convito di Baldassarro 1691. Fortuna Ensemble dir. Roberto Cascio TC.660102
- Sacred cantatas: Corona dei pregi di Maria from Op.13 1717. Ensemble La Flora TC.660103
