= Cello Sonatas Nos. 1 and 2 (Beethoven) =

Set of sonatas by Ludwig van Beethoven

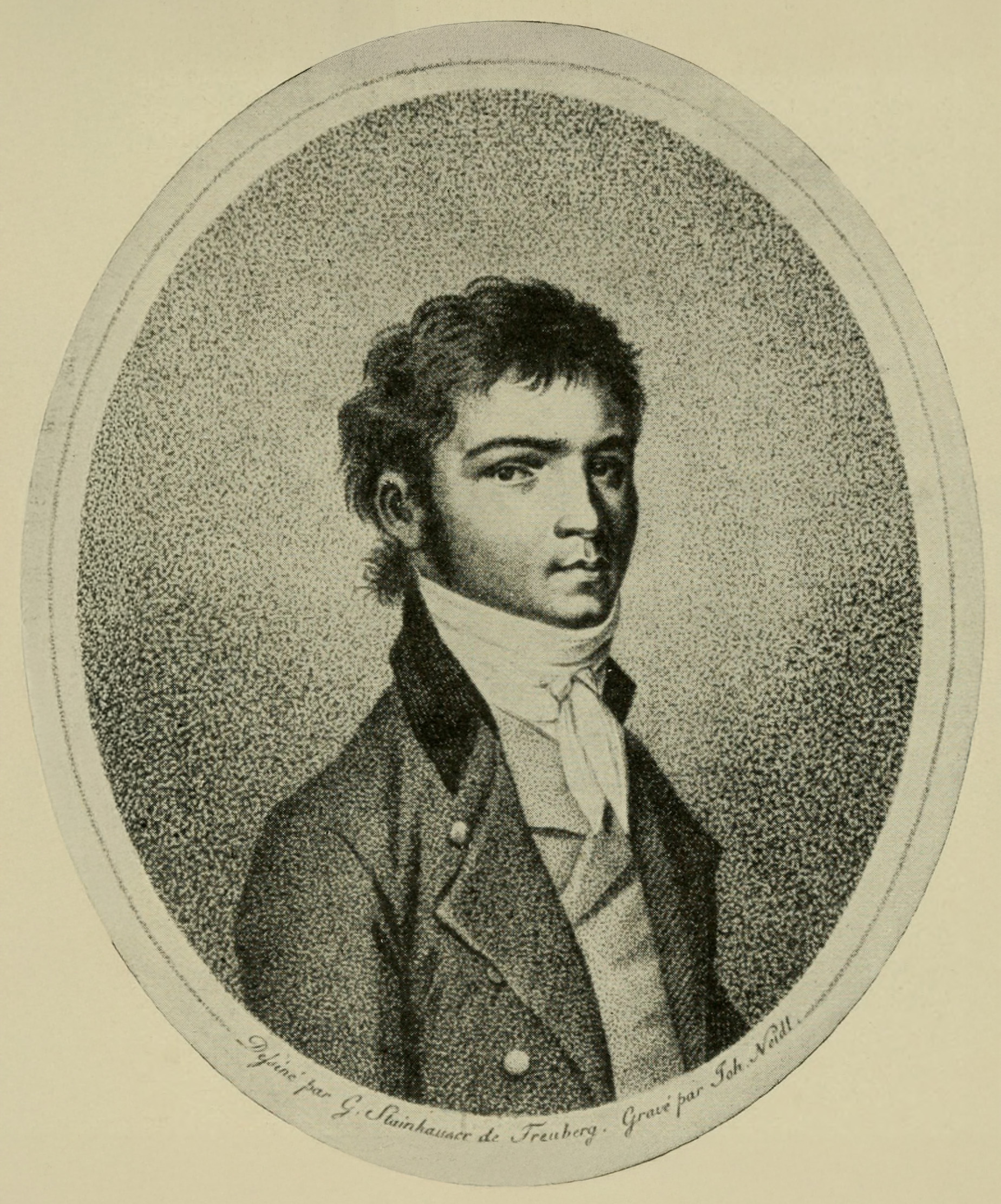
Ludwig van Beethoven, c. 1796

Cello Sonatas No. 1 and No. 2, Op. 5, are two sonatas for cello and piano written by Ludwig van Beethoven in 1796, while he was in Berlin. While there, Beethoven met the King of Prussia Friedrich Wilhelm II, an ardent music-lover and keen cellist. Although the sonatas are dedicated to Friedrich Wilhelm II, Ferdinand Ries tells us that Beethoven "played several times at the court, where he also played the two cello sonatas, opus 5, composed for Duport (the King's first cellist) and himself". Although Jean-Pierre Duport was one of the King's teachers, it is now thought to have been his brother Jean-Louis Duport who had the honor of premiering these sonatas.

In the early 19th century, sonatas for piano and instrument were usually advertised as piano sonatas with instrumental accompaniment. Beethoven's first violin sonatas, for instance, were published as "sonatas for piano with accompaniment by the violin." The cello sonata was especially so plagued, as it grew out of sonatas for continuo; as late as the beginning of the 19th century it was still common for the cello in cello sonatas to double the left hand of the piano part, with the piano right hand playing obbligato figurations and melodies. Beethoven, indeed, is credited with composing one of the first cello sonatas with a written-out piano part. The Op. 5 sonatas are the first two examples of fully developed cello sonatas in the modern tradition.

Both of these sonatas are in two movements, with an extended Adagio introduction preceding the opening Allegro of both of them. The movements are entitled as follows:

== Sonata No. 1 in F major, Op. 5, No. 1 ==
Cello Sonata in G minor, Op. 5, No. 2
I. Adagio sostenuto – Allegro

II. Rondo. Allegro vivace
Performed by John Michel (cello) & Lisa Bergman (piano)

The sonata has two movements:

1. Adagio sostenuto – Allegro
2. Rondo. Allegro vivace

A typical performance of this piece takes approximately 25 minutes.

== Sonata No. 2 in G minor, Op. 5, No. 2 ==
The sonata has two movements:

1. Adagio sostenuto ed espressivo – Allegro molto più tosto presto
2. Rondo. Allegro (in G major)

A typical performance of this piece takes approximately 25 minutes.

=== I. Adagio sostenuto ed espressivo – Allegro molto più tosto presto ===
The first movement, marked Adagio sostenuto ed espressivo, begins with a G minor chord and the piano descending in a dotted scalar pattern. The cello starts a melodic theme in measure five, and the piano modulates to E♭ major in measure seven. The two instruments are in canon in measure 10. The developmental section of the movement utilizes the same dotted rhythm from the first measure, passing through several keys: E♭ major, C minor, E♭ minor, and B♭ minor. A restatement of an earlier theme is heard in A♭ major. The long periods of silence that end the movement resemble the silences present in Beethoven's third symphony (Eroica).

The Allegro molto più tosto presto at 509 measures is one of the longest of early Beethoven allegro movements. The first note of the Allegro acts also as the resolution of the Adagio movement. The cello and piano present the rising theme in equal parts. Flowing triplets in the piano push much of the movement forwards. The two instruments imitate each other going into a transitional theme in B♭ major at measure 70, with the formal secondary theme beginning in measure 106. The closing material of the exposition pulls towards C minor due to the presence of B natural before ending in B♭ major.

The development begins with a varied theme on the closing material of the exposition. The keys of C minor, B♭ major, A♭ major, and D minor are explored. In measure 264, a new theme is introduced in the development, foreshadowing the compositional structure of the first movement Eroica. A shorter version of the first theme is heard in the recapitulation, cut short by a sudden modulation to E♭ major, before the secondary material, once in B♭ major, is now in the home key of G minor. Like after the exposition, a repeat sign is marked at the end of the development and recapitulation. Performers disagree on whether or not to take this repeat: pointing out the massive size of the movement as a reason not to take the repeat. However, there is a lack of evidence supporting Beethoven's writing of an intentless repeat sign.

The coda begins in measure 436. The material comes from the opening theme of the movement, and it is first in C minor and A♭ major before returning to G minor. The cello sustains a G with low triplets in the piano interrupting. The movement ends definitively in G major.

=== II. Rondo. Allegro (in G major) ===
Beethoven's compositional choice of a rondo finale comes from the Classical sonata form. The music begins in the piano, and the cello enters on a playful counter-melody in measure twelve, and the two instruments pass arpeggiated and scalar figures back and forth. A more melodic section in D major begins in measure 33, and the fast-paced music passes through A major and E major before returning to G.

The middle section of the Rondo is in the subdominant key of C major which foreshadows the finale of the fourth piano concerto both harmonically and linearly. A new theme is presented in the piano over 32nd notes in the cello. The first theme is heard briefly in the "wrong" key, suggesting a false return, before the piano's arpeggios bring the music back to G major, and the material from the opening of the movement is heard in the home key. The coda introduces a rhythmically modified version of the original theme and eventually modulates to E♭ major. There is a pause in the energy in measure 278 as the cello and piano exchange simple phrases, and the piano varies a three note pattern. The cello plays a series of sixteenth notes octaves as the piano has 32nd scalar runs to end the movement.

== Domenico Dragonetti ==
The double bassist Domenico Dragonetti performed the Second Cello Sonata accompanied by Beethoven himself. He shocked the composer with the virtuosity of his playing. From that day on, "Beethoven ceased to regard the double-bass as an instrument to be coddled with simplifications of the 'cello part". The difficult double bass parts in Beethoven's symphonies reflect his interaction with Dragonetti and show Beethoven's new respect for the instrument.

== See also ==
- List of compositions by Ludwig van Beethoven
