= List of triple concertos for violin, cello, and piano =

A triple concerto is a concerto for three solo instruments and orchestra.

This list of such concertos for piano trio (consisting of violin, cello and piano) and orchestra is ordered alphabetically by composer surname.

== A ==
- Kalevi Aho
  - Triple Concerto for violin, cello, piano and orchestra (2018)
- Fikret Amirov
  - To the Memory of Ghadsibekov, poem for violin, cello, piano and orchestra (1949)
- Lera Auerbach
  - Serenade for a Melancholic Sea for violin, cello, piano and string orchestra, Op. 68 (2002) (dedicated to Gidon Kremer)

== B ==
- Henk Badings
  - Concertino (1942)
- Ludwig van Beethoven
  - Concerto for Violin, Cello, and Piano in C major, Op. 56 (1804)
- Wilhelm Georg Berger (1929–1993)
  - Concerto for Violin, Cello, Piano and Orchestra, Op. 64 (1984)

== C ==
- Alfredo Casella
  - Triple Concerto, Op. 56 (1933)
- Paul Constantinescu
  - Triplu concert (1963)

== F ==
- Lorenzo Ferrero
  - Concerto for Violin, Cello, Piano and Orchestra (1995)
- Benjamin Frankel
  - Serenata Concertante for piano trio and orchestra, one movement (in parts), Op. 37 (1960)

== G ==
- Giorgio Federico Ghedini
  - Concerto dell´Albatro (The albatross concerto) for violin, cello, piano, and orchestra (with narrator) (1945)

== H ==
- Daron Hagen
  - Orpheus and Eurydice for violin, cello, piano and orchestra (2006)
- Bernhard Heiden
  - Triple concerto (1957)
- Alun Hoddinott
  - Triple concerto, Op. 124 (1986)
- Vagn Holmboe
  - Concerto for violin, cello, piano and chamber orchestra (once called Chamber Concerto No. 4) M.139 (1942)

== J ==
- Paul Juon
  - Concerto (Episodes concertantes) for violin, cello, and piano with orchestra [D minor], Op. 45 (1911)

== M ==
- Gian Francesco Malipiero
  - Concerto a tre (1938)
- Bohuslav Martinů
  - Concertino with string orchestra, H.232 (1933)
  - Concert, H.231 (1933)
- Emánuel Moór
  - Triple Concerto, Op. 70
- Nico Muhly
  - Triple Concerto for violin, cello, piano and string orchestra (2010)

== P ==
- Jordan Pal
  - Triple Concerto for Violin, Cello, Piano and Orchestra "Starling" (2013)

== R ==
- Marga Richter
  - Variations and Interludes on Themes from Monteverdi and Bach for violin, cello, piano and orchestra (1992)
- Jeffrey Ryan
  - Equilateral: Triple Concerto for Piano Trio and Orchestra (2007)
- Wolfgang Rihm
  - Trio Concerto for violin, violoncello, piano and orchestra (2014)

== S ==
- Felipe Senna
  - Danzas No.2 - triple concerto for Violin, Cello, Piano and Orchestra (2016)

== T ==
- Alexander Tcherepnin
  - Triple Concerto, Op. 47 (1931)
  - Triple Concerto, Op.47-bis (1967)

== V ==
- Kevin Volans
  - Trio Concerto (2005)
- Jan Václav Voříšek
  - Grand Rondeau concertant, Op.25 (1825)

== W ==
- Wolfram Wagner
  - Concerto for Violin, Cello, Piano and Orchestra (1997)
- Robert Ward
  - Dialogues (1986, also arranged for piano trio)
- Stanley Weiner
  - Triple concerto, Op. 71

== Z ==
- Ellen Taaffe Zwilich
  - Triple concerto for violin, cello and piano and Orchestra (1995)

== See also ==
- List of compositions for violin and orchestra
- List of compositions for cello and orchestra
- List of compositions for piano and orchestra
- Piano trio repertoire
- String instrument repertoire
- List of solo cello pieces
- List of compositions for cello and piano
- List of double concertos for violin and cello
