= Randall Svane =

American composer (born 1955)

Randall Svane is an American composer, born in 1955. His works have been played by the New York Philharmonic, Cincinnati Chamber Orchestra, the Borromeo String Quartet, the Colonial Symphony, Schola Cantorum on Hudson, and in the Musikfest at Gut Bötersheim. A CD of his music, played by cellist Richard Locker was released in 2005.

== See also ==
- Mass 2005
