= Giuseppe Maria Jacchini =

Italian cellist & composer (1667–1727)

Giuseppe Maria Jacchini (16 July 1667 in Bologna – 2 May 1727) was a cellist and composer from the Papal States.

== Life ==
Jacchini received his musical training as a choirboy in the San Petronio Basilica in Bologna. There, he studied composition with Giacomo Antonio Perti and Domenico Gabrielli. Later, Jacchini became a cellist in the "cappella musicale" of the San Petronio Basilica. He is possibly the "Giosefo del Violonzino" referred to in the period from 1680 to 1688.

He composed mainly instrumental music with cello, violin, and keyboard continuo. He dedicated his opus 4 to the Bolognese Count and composer Pirro Albergati, who had campaigned for Jacchini's permanent position in the orchestra of the cathedral of Bologna.

Jacchini became a member of the prestigious "Accademia Filarmonica" on 16 December 1688. He also served as conductor of the "Collegio dei Nobili" and the church of S. Luigi.

His cello works helped to strengthen the position of the cello as a solo instrument. As an excellent companion, he played frequently at the theater in the city. His trumpet concertos prepared for celebrations at the San Petronio Basilica are in the tradition of the works of his teacher Perti, Giuseppe Torelli and Petronio Franceschini.

== Works ==
- 12 "Sonate a Violoncello solo violin and cello ea per camera" Op. 1 (Bologna to 1692)
- 12 "Sonata per camera a violini e Violoncello" Op. 2 (Bologna, around 1695)
- "Concerti per camera a violino e violoncello solo e nel fine due sonate a violoncello solo col basso" Op. 3 (Fortuniano Rosati, Modena, 1697)
- 10 "Concerti per camera [...] con violoncello obligato" Op. 4 (Bologna, 1701)
- Sonata for Trumpet and Strings (Bologna, 1695)
- "Trattenimenti per camera a 3, 4, 5, e 6 strumenti con alcuni a una e due trombe": Op. 5 (Bologna, 1703)
