= Sonata for Solo Cello (Ligeti) =

Unaccompanied cello sonata

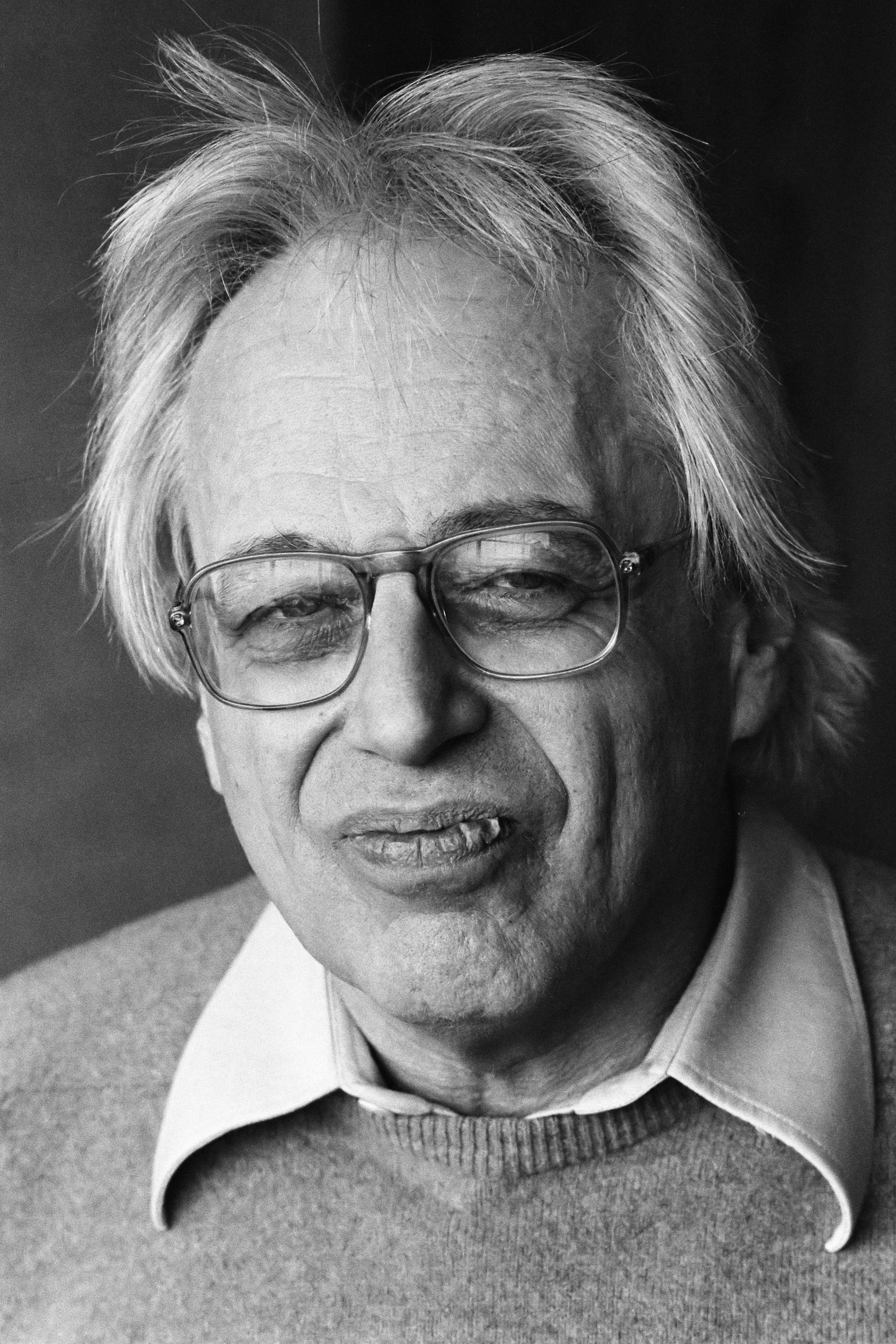
György Ligeti, 1984

The Sonata for Solo Cello is an unaccompanied cello sonata written by György Ligeti between 1948 and 1953. The piece was initially received poorly by the Soviet-run Composer's Union and was not allowed to be published or performed. However, in the 1980s and 90s, after over a quarter century in repose, the piece reemerged and has since become a well-known part of the standard cello repertoire.

== History ==
Ligeti was nearing the end of his schooling in 1948 and had already established himself as a highly gifted student. In this year, he composed the Dialogo, which would later become the first movement of the Sonata, for a female cellist and fellow student at the Budapest Music Academy, Annuss Virány, with whom Ligeti was "secretly in love." Virány purportedly was not aware of the reason behind Ligeti’s generosity; she merely thanked him and never played it. Several years later, in 1953, Ligeti met Vera Dénes, an older and more celebrated cellist, who asked him for a piece of music. Having written only one unperformed cello work to date, Ligeti offered to expand the Dialogo into a "two-movement short sonata," adding a virtuosic Capriccio movement. With the country now a part of the Eastern Bloc, Ligeti was required to subject all his compositions to the scrutiny of the Communist-controlled Composers' Union, at the risk of losing his job. He later recalled his interaction with the Union:

Vera Dénes learned the Sonata and played it for the committee. We were denied permission to publish the work or to perform it in public, but we were allowed to record it for radio broadcast. She made an excellent recording for Hungarian Radio, but it was never broadcast. The committee decided that it was too 'modern' because of the second movement.

With that decree, the piece was set aside, not to be performed again until 1979. From then, the popularity of the Sonata grew, and in 2005 became a qualifying test for the Rostropovich Cello Competition in Paris.

== Music ==
The Sonata comprises two contrasting movements:

1. Dialogo – Adagio, rubato, cantabile
2. Capriccio – Presto con slancio

=== I. Dialogo ===
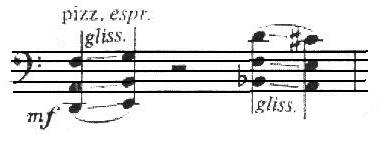
Opening of the sonata

Ligeti freely admitted that his pre-1956 compositions were heavily influenced by Béla Bartók and Zoltán Kodály. Of the first movement of the Sonata, he described:

It's a dialogue. Because it's like two people, a man and a woman, conversing. I used the C string, the G string and the A string separately... I had been writing much more "modern" music in 1946 and 1947, and then in '48 I began to feel that I should try to be more "popular"... I attempted in this piece to write a beautiful melody, with a typical Hungarian profile, but not a folksong... or only half, like in Bartók or in Kodály—actually, closer to Kodály.

The movement is marked "Adagio, rubato, cantabile" and comprises a total of 16 measures, each consisting a varied number of beats ranging from three to twenty, with barlines marking only phrase divisions. It begins with two pairs of pizzicato chords separated by a glissando, an extended technique which was championed by Bartók. The pitches in the first chord pair constitute a D dorian scale, while the second pair has tonal implications, emphasizing the dominant and establishing the feeling of D as tonic. A melody in D phrygian begins.

In an article delving into the technical aspects of the Sonata, Søren Beech suggests that the melody may have been inspired by ancient modal tunes preserved through the Eastern European folk music tradition. The modal melody is presented throughout the movement with distinct alterations: it is stated with rhythmic augmentation and then in polyphony, a testament to Ligeti's counterpoint training under Ferenc Farkas. A second melody is introduced in measure 6, this one with tonal implications, which are later confirmed by chordal accompaniment. Beech also makes the observation that the important tones of both melodies outline descending tetrachords, evidence of the influence of Bartók, who often used fourths as a structural element in melodies. After a final restatement of the phrygian melody in polyphony, the movement ends with a restatement of the opening pizzicato glissando motif arriving finally on a Picardy third.

=== II. Capriccio ===
While on the spectrum from Kodály's romantic style to the more aggressive style of Bartók, the Dialogo is considered closer to Kodály, the Capriccio is Bartókian.

Because the second movement had the 'ambition' to become a sonata movement I wrote it in sonata form. It is a virtuoso piece in my later style that is closer to Bartók. I was 30 years old when I wrote it. I loved virtuosity and took the playing to the edge of virtuosity much like Paganini.

In fact, the title Capriccio was a direct reference to the famously brilliant Caprices for violin by Niccolò Paganini, which Ligeti had encountered as a child. In contrast to the lyrical, rubato Dialogo, the Capriccio is written almost entirely in an unrelenting 3/8 pattern, breaking only once, abruptly in the middle for a truncated reminiscence of the Dialogo. The opening is marked "Presto con slancio" (very quick with impetus) and "forte vigoroso".

Two interval-motifs are exclaimed separately, which are then woven together with increasing intricacy in a massive crescendo, which subsides into a modal sounding second theme, the tones of which alternate with a pedal tone of A. This theme and the opening motifs share a tritone relationship, a compositional device prominently used by Bartók. The modal melody is once again reiterated, this time "tremolo sul tasto", (over the fingerboard) and harmonized with a perfect fifth above, a chord planing technique which also reflects Bartók's influence. A new rhythmic section erupts consisting of disjunct perfect fifth chords. This heralds the beginning of a pseudo-development section, in which the second theme is elaborated. The Dialogo returns briefly and is followed by a full recapitulation and coda, finally ending exuberantly (with tutta la forza) in G major.

== Notable recordings ==
- Matt Haimovitz, cello. Suites and Sonatas for Solo Cello. Works by Britten, Reger, Crumb, and Ligeti. Deutsche Grammophon CD 431 813-2, 1991.
- Miklós Perényi, cello, Várjon, Dénes, piano. Hungarian Cello Music. Works by Ligeti, Veress, Liszt, Dohnányi, Weiner, Mihály. Hungaroton Classic, 1999.
- Emmanuelle Bertrand, cello. Œuvres pour viononcelle seul. (Works for solo cello.) Works by Dutilleux, Ligeti, Bacri, Crumb, Henze. Radio France. Harmonia Mundi, HMN 911699, 2000.

== Notes ==
=== Sources ===
- Antokoletz, Elliot (1990). The Music of Bela Bartok: A Study of Tonality and Progression in Twentieth-Century Music. Berkeley: University of California Press.
- Beech, Søren (November 2006). "A Ligeti Masterwork. Exploring the Structure of György Ligeti's Sonata for Solo Cello". Strings. 21 (4): 32, 34–38.
- Campbell, Murray; Greated, Clive; Myers, Arnold (2004). Musical Instruments: History, Technology, and Performance of Instruments of Western Music. New York: Oxford University Press.
- Paul, Steven (1991). "A Tale of Two Movements". Suites and Sonatas for Solo Cello (liner notes). Matt Haimovitz, cello. Deutsche Grammophon. CD 431 813-2.
- Steinitz, Richard (2003). György Ligeti: Music of the Imagination. Boston: Northeastern University Press.
- Toop, Richard (1999). György Ligeti. London: Phaidon Press.
- Várnai, Péter; Häusler, Josef; Samuel, Samuel; Ligeti, György (1983). Ligeti in Conversation with Péter Várnai, Josef Häusler, Claude Samuel, and Himself. London: Eulenburg Books.
