= René Guillou =

French composer

René-Alfred-Octave Guillou
- Born: 8 October 1903; Rennes
- Died: 14 December 1958 (aged 55); Paris
- Occupation: Composer

René-Alfred-Octave Guillou (8 October 1903 in Rennes – 14 December 1958 in Paris) was a French composer and pianist.

Hailed as a prodigy aged 7, in an article in Musical America from 1912, Guillou is described as a virtuoso pianist and composer of piano works, quartets and a high mass. He was described as 'the heir of Mozart'.

After several years at the conservatory of his native city, Guillou studied at the Conservatoire de Paris with Marcel Samuel-Rousseau, Charles-Marie Widor and Henri Busser. In his third participation in the competition for the Prix de Rome, he won the Premier Grand Prix in 1926 with the cantata L'Autre mère.

Besides, since 1920, Guillou was the successor of Jacques de La Presle, organist at the great organ of the Church of Notre-Dame, Versailles, restored by Merklin. In 1923 he played the organ part here in a performance of the oratorio Marie-Madeleine by Jules Massenet. In 1926 he handed over the post to Madeleine Heurtel, a niece of Léon Boëllmann and daughter of the director of the École Niedermeyer, in order to begin his stay in the Villa Medici in Rome, associated with the Prix de Rome.

During his stay in Rome until 1930, Guillou composed his Habenera for violin and orchestra; in addition, he composed two symphonies and other orchestral works, chamber music and songs.

At the French Music Festival in Monte Carlo in 1935, Guillou accompanied the renowned soprano Elisabeth Schumann, performed solo piano recitals, and accompanied the Monte Carlo String Quartet in a performance of his Piano Quintet. His Élégie, for English horn and orchestra, was also performed at the festival.

In May 1946, he and the French composer Jean Yatove, sponsored a then largely unknown Francois Gilbert, the pseudonym of Gilbert Silly, for his admission to SACEM as a composer. Francois Gilbert was later to change his pseudonym once more to Gilbert Bécaud.

His brother Ernest Guillou became known as a conductor and composer.

Guillou died in Paris in 1956.

== Works ==
- Les Amants de Vérone, cantata, 1924
- L'Autre mère, cantata, 1926
- Élégie for viola (or English horn) and piano, 1927
- Habanera for violin and orchestra, 1927 with the Concerts Lamoureux
- Pièces for piano, 1927
- Assise for piano, 1928
- Puisque j'ai mis ma lèvre after a poem by Victor Hugo, 1928 at the Académie de France à Rome
- Mezzogiorno - Midi sur Rome 1929 at the Lyceum Romano
- Andante symphonique for pipe organ, 1929
- Cortège de nonnes for organ, 1929
- Loetitia Pia for organ, 1929
- Nocturne mystique for organ, 1929
- Diurnes for piano, 1929
- Plein air for piano, 1929
- Quatre pièces for piano, 1929
- Suite des motifs de terroir for piano, 1929
- Trois pièces for violin and piano, 1931
- Quintette pour piano, deux violons, alto et violoncelle, 1932
- Adagio et Suite for piano and cello, 1934
- Élégie for English horn and orchestra, 1935
- Ballade for bassoon and piano, 1936
- Hymne de la Bretagne à Paris, for the Exposition Internationale des Arts et Techniques dans la Vie Moderne in Paris, 1937
- Hymne funèbre, with the Concerts Colonne 1938
- Sonatine for alto saxophone, English horn or French horn and piano, 1946
- Symphonie en la mineur, 1948
- Mon nom est Rolande, Legend for French horn and piano, 1950
- Seconde Symphonie en ut majeur, 1956 Pierre-Michel Le Conte conducting
