= Cello Sonata No. 1 (Reger) =

1892 composition by Max Reger

Cello Sonata
- by Max Reger
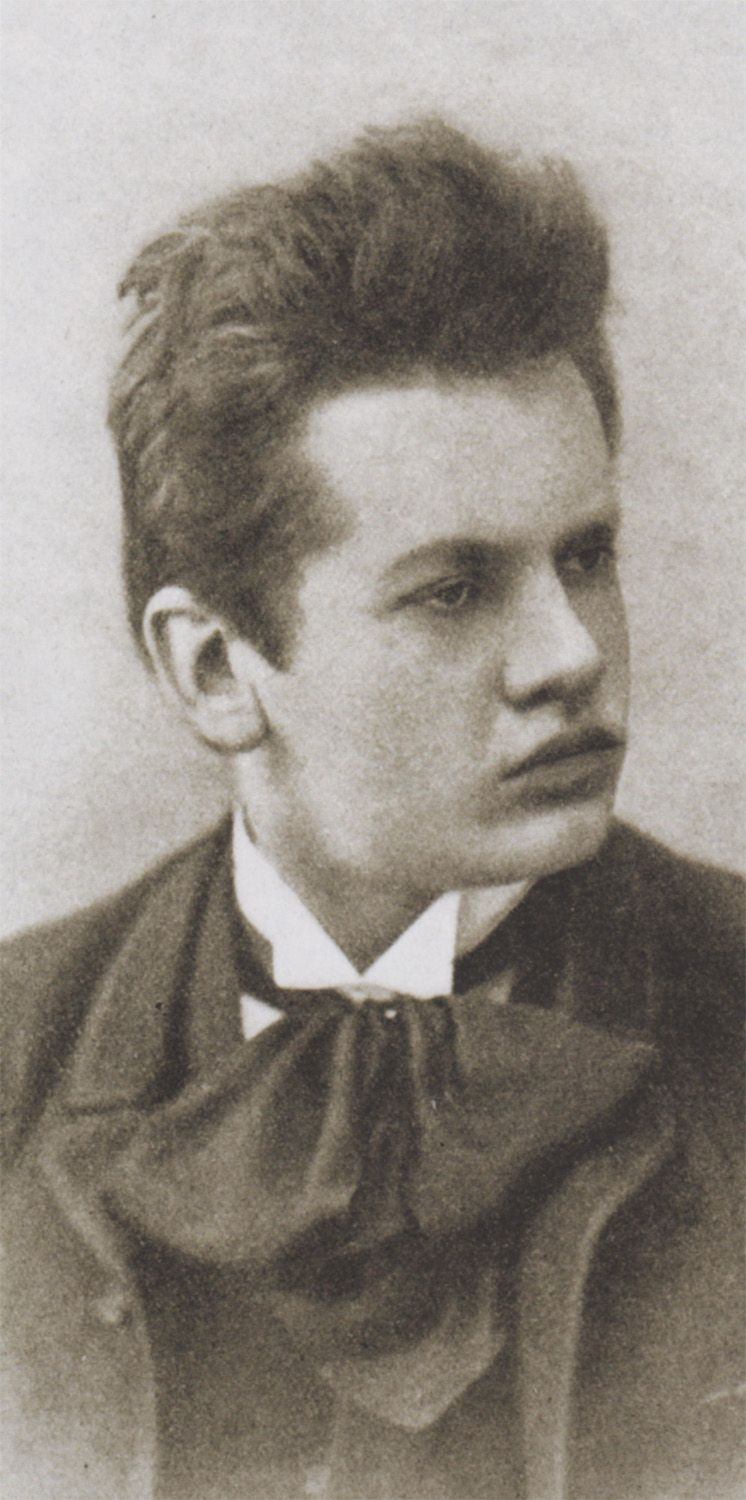
- Reger in 1890
- Key: F minor
- Opus: 5
- Composed: 1892
- Dedication: Oskar Brückner
- Performed: 17 October 1893
- Published: 1893

The Cello Sonata in F minor, Op. 5, was composed by Max Reger in 1892 in Wiesbaden. He dedicated it to the cellist Oskar Brückner who performed it first, with the composer as the pianist, in Wiesbaden on 17 October 1893. It was published by Augener & Co., London, in September 1893.

== History ==
Reger studied at the Wiesbaden Conservatory from 1890 to 1893, composition with Hugo Riemann. Reger composed his first Cello Sonata in F minor in 1892. Riemann got Reger his first publishing contract, with the London house Augener & Co. for seven years. They published the cello sonata in September 1893. Reger dedicated the work to the cellist Oskar Brückner who performed it first, with the composer as the pianist, in Wiesbaden on 17 October 1893.

== Music and recordings ==
The sonata is structured in three movements:

1. Allegro maestoso ma appassionato
2. Adagio con gran affetto – Più mosso assai
3. Finale / Allegro (un poco scherzando)

The sonata shares characteristics with the works in the genre by Johannes Brahms, in harmony, rhythm, figuration, a rich piano part and passionate cello lines. The opening of the first movement has been described as "surging passionately and heroically". The second movement in D♭ major begins almost like an operatic scene, with a cello line like recitative. The finale is lively and playful. The musicologist Calum MacDonald writes: "Just before the coda there is a moment of quiet reflection that brings home how the opening phrase of the finale theme echoes that of the first movement’s first subject, before the tumultuous closing bars. In the final cadence the piano alludes to the dotted figure with which the sonata had begun". Gavin Dixon notes in a review that "intense drama is present from the first note of the First Sonata", and summarizes that the cello sonatas are "psychologically turbulent", complex and traumatic.

Recordings have included one by Alexander Kniazev (cello) and Édouard Oganessian (piano) as part of their recordings of the complete works by Reger for cello and piano. They played the four sonatas in 1997 and the other pieces in 2008 and 2009. Another recording of Reger's cello sonatas and cello suites was made by Alban Gerhardt and Markus Becker in 2007. Reviewer Ivan March notes that "both artists produce the passionate response demanded", especially Gerhardt's "warm, resonant middle register" and Becker's ability to meet "the music's considerable virtuosity".

== Bibliography ==
- Dixon, Gavin (2011). "Max Reger (1873–1916) / Complete Works for Cello and Piano". musicweb-international.com.
- MacDonald, Calum (2008). "Cello Sonatas". Hyperion.
- March, Ivan. "Reger Cello Sonatas and Suites". Gramophone.
- Woolf, Jonathan (2013). "Max Reger (1873–1916) / Complete Works for Cello and Piano". musicweb-international.com.
- "Max Reger Curriculum vitae". Max-Reger-Institute. Archived from the original on 28 September 2015.
- "Sonate f-Moll Op. 5 / für Violoncello und Klavier" (in German). Max-Reger-Institute. 2016.
