= Cello sonatas (Vivaldi) =

Chamber music by Antonio Vivaldi

Cello Sonatas
- Chamber music by Antonio Vivaldi
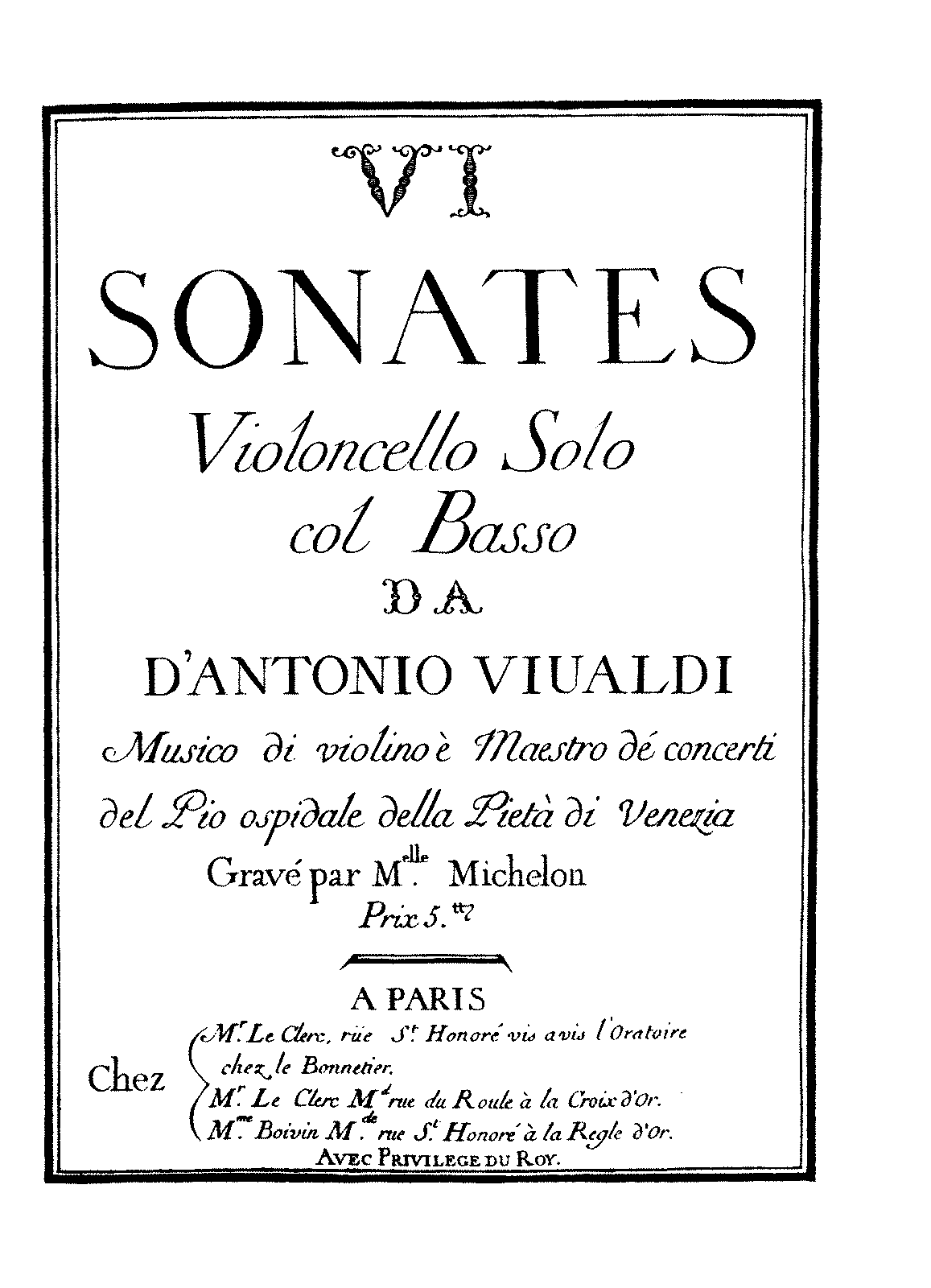
- Advertisement of a set of six printed sonatas, in Mercure de France
- Catalogue: RV 38–47
- Composed: c. 1720–1730
- Movements: 4 in each sonata
- Scoring: cello; continuo

Antonio Vivaldi composed several sonatas for cello and continuo. A set of six cello sonatas, written between 1720 and 1730, was published in Paris in 1740. He wrote at least four other cello sonatas, with two manuscripts kept in Naples, another in Wiesentheid, and one known to be lost.

== History ==
When Vivaldi worked in Venice, the cello sonata became a popular genre. Benedetto Marcello had composed six cello sonatas in a similar style shortly before Vivaldi. Eleanor Selfridge-Field writes: "the impetus for Vivaldi to write these works at such a late age may have come from the general popularity of the cello sonatas of the 1730s, or perhaps from the specific example of Marcello, who wrote two collections of cello sonatas published in that decade".

Vivaldi wrote his at least ten cello sonatas between 1720 and 1730, of which nine are extant. The manuscripts of six of them (RV 40, 41, 43, 45, 46 and 47) are held by the Bibliothèque nationale in Paris. Manuscripts of three sonatas (RV 39, 44 and 47) are kept at the Conservatorio di S. Pietro a Majella in Naples. Three manuscripts of cello sonatas are held by the library of Schloss Wiesentheid, Bavaria): RV 42, 44 and 46.

The six cello sonatas held in Paris were copied around 1725, for a French client, possibly Count Gergy, the French ambassador in Venice who commissioned music by Vivaldi for noble customers in Paris. Three of the sonatas (RV 40, 42 and 43) seem to be pasticcios from earlier compositions, based on their style. They appear to be a collection for a single customer rather than to be printed, by monotony in key and no numbering.

The three sonatas held in Naples were most probably copied for Count Maddaloni, an amateur cellist for whom Pergolesi composed a cello sonata, and Leonardo Leo six cello concertos. These sonatas are part-autographs, with all verbal markings by the composer which assures the authenticity of these compositions. Count Rudolf Franz Erwein von Schönborn Wiesentheid, also an amateur cellist, ordered three Vivaldi cello sonatas.

The Paris sonatas were published in 1740 by Leclerc and Boivin, titled VI Sonates Violoncello Solo col Basso. They appeared without an opus number, but are sometimes improperly called Op. 14. The print obviously happened without the composer's permission; music for cello was in increasing demand in Paris at the time, and Vivaldi's name popular.

The three sonatas RV 39, 44 and 42, were published by Amadeus Verlag in Winterthur in 1975, edited by Walter Kolneder who assumed that it was their first publication.

== Music ==
The sonatas are all in four movements, typical for late Baroque sonatas. The tempos follow a pattern of slow-fast-slow-fast consistently.

=== Published in Paris, 1740 ===
- Sonata No. 1 in B♭ major, RV 47 (
  - Largo
  - Allegro
  - Largo
  - Allegro
  )
- Sonata No. 2 in F major, RV 41 (
  - Largo
  - Allegro
  - Largo
  - Allegro
  )
- Sonata No. 3 in A minor, RV 43 (
  - Largo
  - Allegro
  - Largo
  - Allegro
  )
- Sonata No. 4 in B♭ major, RV 45 (
  - Largo
  - Allegro
  - Largo
  - Allegro
  )
- Sonata No. 5 in E minor, RV 40 (
  - Largo
  - Allegro
  - Largo
  - Allegro
  )
- Sonata No. 6 in B♭ major, RV 46 (
  - Largo
  - Allegro
  - Largo
  - Allegro
  )

=== Other cello sonatas ===
- Sonata No. 7 in A minor, RV 44 (
  - Largo
  - Allegro poco
  - Largo
  - Allegro
  )
- Sonata No. 8 in E♭ major, RV 39 (
  - Larghetto
  - Allegro
  - Andante
  - Allegro
  )
- Sonata No. 9 in G minor, RV 42 (
  - Preludio: Largo
  - Allemanda: Andante
  - Sarabanda: Largo
  - Giga: Allegro
  )
- Sonata in D minor, RV 38 (lost)

== Recordings ==
The nine extant cello sonatas were recorded in 1993 by David Watkin as the soloist and a continuo group of cellist Helen Gough, David Miller (playing theorbo or archlute or guitar), and Robert King on harpsichord or organ.
