= Finale (music) =

Last movement, ending, or final sequence of a musical work

A finale is the last movement of a sonata, symphony, or concerto; the ending of a piece of non-vocal classical music which has several movements; or, a prolonged final sequence at the end of an act of an opera or work of musical theatre.

Michael Talbot wrote of the finales typical in sonatas: "The rondo is the form par excellence used for final movements, and ... its typical character and structural properties accord perfectly with those thought desirable in a sonata finale of the early nineteenth century." Carl Czerny (1791–1857) observed "that first movements and finales ought to—and in practice actually do—proclaim their contrasted characters already in their opening themes."

In theatrical music, Christoph Willibald Gluck was an early proponent of extended finales, with multiple characters, to support the "increasingly natural and realistic" stories in his operas that "improved continuity and theatrical validity" beyond the earlier works.

== See also ==
- The vaudeville final
