= Emmanuelle Bertrand =

French cellist

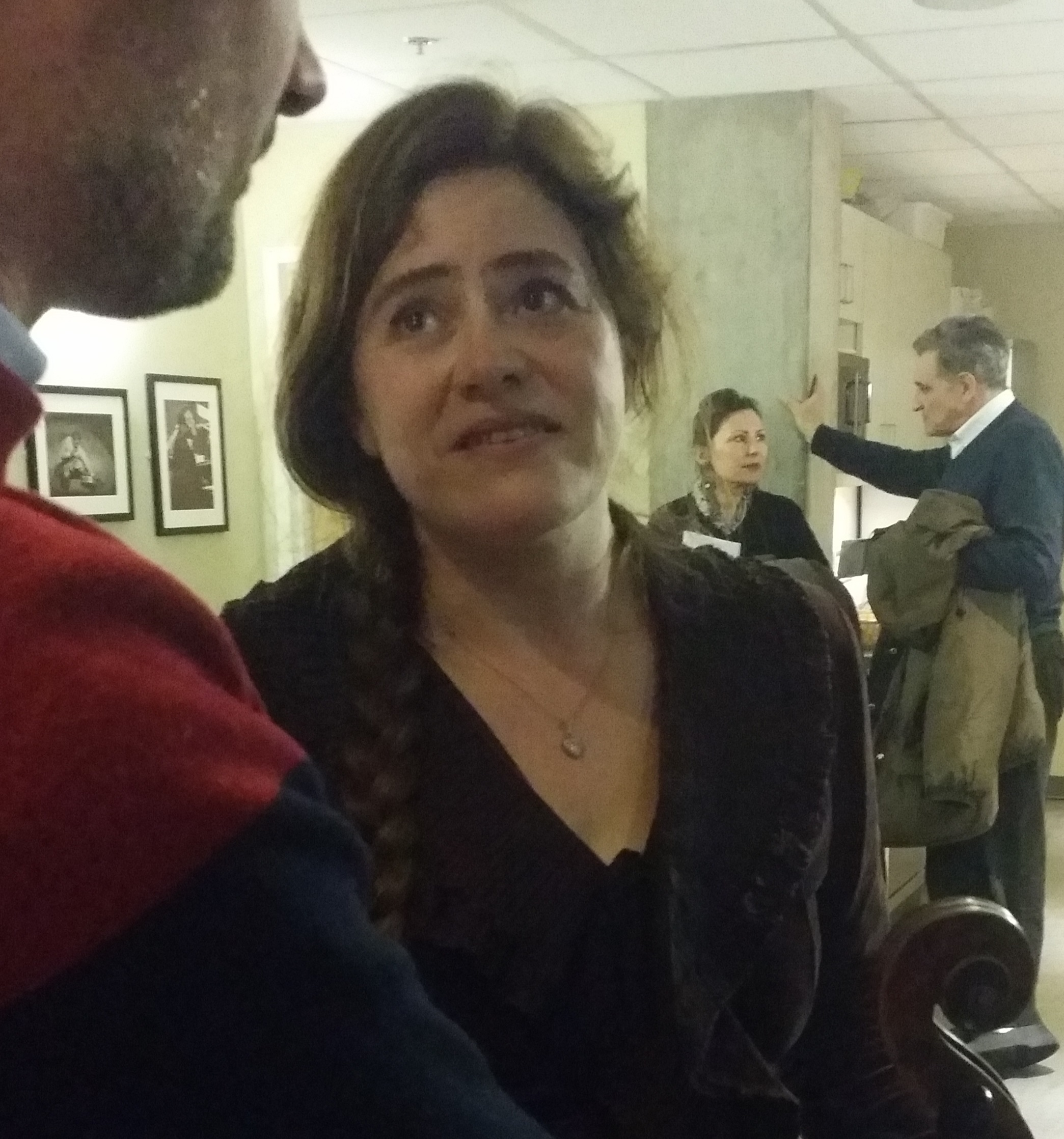
Emmanuelle Bertrand

Emmanuelle Bertrand (born 5 November 1973 in Firminy, Loire), is a French cellist.

== Biography ==
Bertrand studied with Jean Deplace and Philippe Muller, and received early support from Henri Dutilleux.

Nicolas Bacri has dedicated to her his Fourth Suite for cello solo op. 50. She premiered Luciano Berio's Chanson pour Pierre Boulez in 2000.

Her recordings as a soloist or together with the pianist Pascal Amoyel have received the highest musical awards : Cannes Classical Award, Diapason d'Or, "Choc" of Le Monde de la musique, etc. She also received a Victoire de la musique classique in 2002 and has been decorated as a "Chevalier de l'Ordre des Arts et des Lettres".

Together with the pianist Pascal Amoyel and the director Jean Piat, she created in 2005 the theatral concert "Block 15".

== Critical reaction ==
Among the artists of her generation, Emmanuelle Bertrand is one of the cellists who impressed me much. Her interpretation fully satisfied me for the transparency of her sound, her rhythmic strictness, her technical perfection, the brio of her playing. I do not hesitate to claim that she is a true revelation to me.

— Henri Dutilleux.

== Recordings ==
Works for solo cello. Works by Henri Dutilleux (Trois strophes sur le nom de SACHER), Hans Werner Henze (Serenade), George Crumb (Sonata), György Ligeti (Sonata), Nicolas Bacri (Suite No. 4). Radio France. Harmonia Mundi, HMN 911699, 2000.

Le violoncelle parle (The cello speaks). Works by Benjamin Britten (Suite for solo cello No. 3 Op. 87), Gaspar Cassado (Suite for solo cello), Pascal Amoyel (Itinerance), Zoltán Kodály (Sonata for solo cello Op. 8). CD and DVD (le violoncelle parle, a Christian Leble film). Harmonia Mundi, HMN 902078, 2011.
