= Sonata for Solo Cello (Crumb) =

- by George Crumb
- Composed: 1955
- Dedication: Vivian Crumb
- Performed: March 15, 1957
- Published: 1958
- Movements: 3

The Sonata for Solo Cello was written by the American avant-garde composer, George Crumb, in 1955. As one of Crumb's earlier works, it is heavily influenced by the works of Paul Hindemith and Béla Bartók.

== Structure ==
This piece is divided into three movements. The first movement, Fantasia, begins with plucked chords, strumming downwards, then alternates between these chords and a bowed melody. This comprises the A section. The fantasia follows a ternary form.

The second movement, entitled Tema Pastorale con variazioni, consists of a theme followed by three variations. The first variation is very similar to the theme, but with steady eighth notes and many meter changes. The second variation is played completely pizzicato, again with many changes of meter. The third variation is much more lyrical than the first two, and strays from the theme much more than the other variations. The second movement ends with a muted repetition of the beginning of the theme.

The third movement, entitled Toccata, begins with a slow introduction, which grows to a high F sharp before cascading into the body of the movement. This Toccata consists mainly of stacked minor chords, but also has numerous references to the theme of the first movement.

The entire sonata is approximately 10 1/2 minutes (630 s) long.

== History ==
The sonata was dedicated to Crumb's mother Vivian. It was first performed on 15 March 1957, and published in 1958.
