= Sonata for Solo Cello (Kodály) =

1915 composition for solo cello by Zoltán Kodály

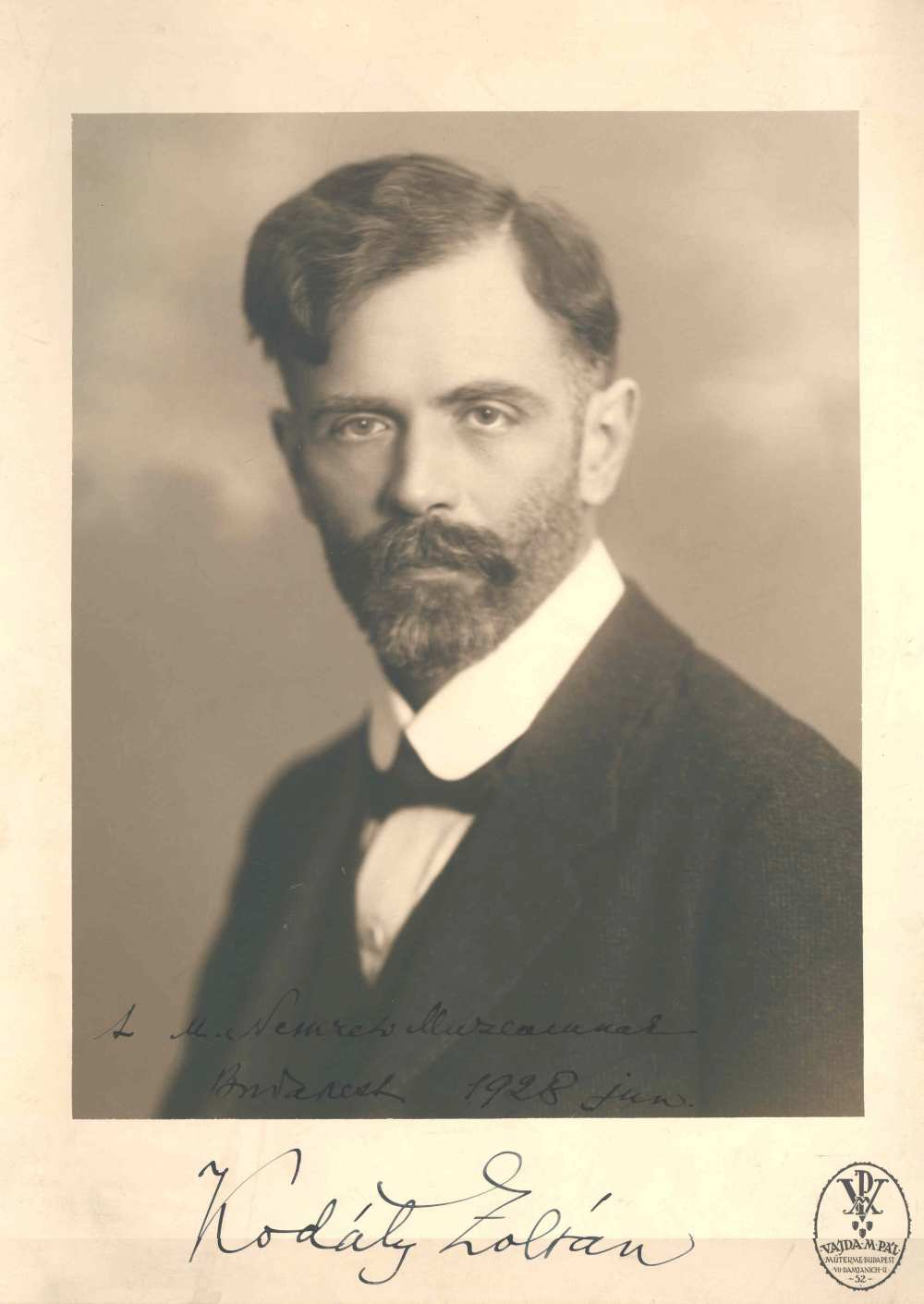
Zoltán Kodály in 1928

The Hungarian composer Zoltán Kodály wrote his Sonata for Solo Cello in B minor, Op. 8, in 1915. It was first performed in 1918 and published in 1921.

It is among the most significant works for solo cello written since Johann Sebastian Bach's Cello Suites. It contains influences of Debussy and Bartók, as well as the inflections and nuances of Hungarian folk music.

== Structure ==
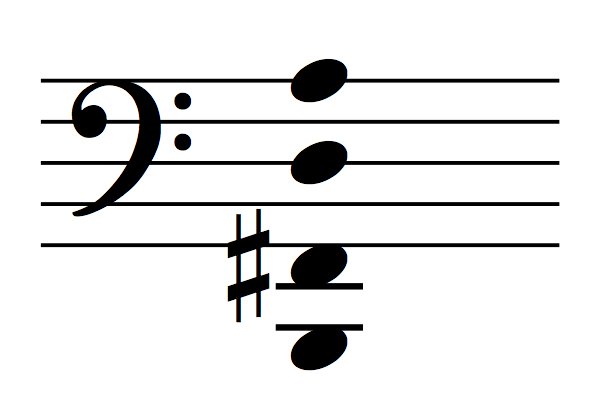
Scordatura used in the Sonata for Solo Cello. The upper two strings remain the same as in normal tuning, while the lower strings are tuned down one semitone. The piece wavers between B minor and B major, and Kodály used the tuning to extend the instrument's tonal, dynamic and expressive range.

The solo sonata is in three movements:

1. Allegro maestoso ma appassionato
2. Adagio con gran espressione
3. Allegro molto vivace

== Premiere ==
The sonata was written in 1915 but its premiere was delayed due to World War I. It was premiered by Jenő Kerpely (1885–1954; sometimes seen as Eugène de Kerpely) in Budapest on 7 May 1918. Kerpely was the cellist of the Waldbauer-Kerpely Quartet, which had premiered the first four string quartets by Bartók. It was published by Universal Edition in Vienna in 1921.

== Recognition ==
Kodály himself predicted that "in 25 years no cellist will be accepted who has not played it". Indeed, less than 40 years later, in 1956, the sonata was a set piece for the Casals Competition in Mexico City. The performance of the sonata by George Neikrug (1919–2019) in his debut at the New York Town Hall in 1947 was the first American performance of the work for many years.

== Recordings ==
János Starker first played the sonata for Kodály at the age of 15, in 1939, then again in 1967 shortly before the composer's death. Kodály told Starker: "If you correct the ritard in the third movement, it will be the Bible performance." Starker recorded it four times (1948, 1950, 1957 and 1970), the 1948 78-rpm recording winning a Grand Prix du Disque.
