= String sextet repertoire =

Compositions for six string instruments

Among the repertoire for the standard string sextet (2 violins, 2 violas, and 2 cellos) are the following works. The works are ordered by the surname of the composer.

Afanasyev, Nikolai

- String Sextet

Barvinsky, Vassily

- String Sextet (1914)

Bečan, Nejc (1984)

- Clownology (The Jester, Pierrot – the sad Clown, The Circus Clown)

Berezovsky, Nikolai

- String Sextet No. 1
- String Sextet No. 2

Boccherini, Luigi

- 6 String Sextets, Op. 23 (1776)

Borodin, Aleksandr

- String Sextet in D minor

Børresen, Hakon

- String Sextet in G major, Op. 5 (1901)

Brahms, Johannes

- String Sextet No. 1 in B♭ major, Op. 18 (1860)
- String Sextet No. 2 in G major, Op. 36 (1864–65)

Bridge, Frank

- String sextet in E♭ major (1906–13)

Busch, Adolf

- String Sextet

Cissell, Luke

- String Sextet No. 1 (2019)
- String Sextet No. 2 (2019)

Davidov, Alexei

- String Sextet in E♭ major Op.12

Davydov, Karl

- String Sextet Op.35 (1879)

Dohnányi, Ernst von

- String Sextet W080 (1893/6/8)

Antonín Dvořák

- String Sextet A major, Op. 48, (B. 80) (1878)

Gade, Niels

- String Sextet in E♭ major, Op. 35

Geviksman, Vitali

- String Sextet (1960)

Glass, Louis

- String Sextet, Op.15

Glière, Reinhold

- String Sextet No. 1, Op. 1 (1900)
- String Sextet No. 2, Op. 7 (1902)
- String Sextet No. 3, Op. 11 (1904)

Hofmann, Heinrich

- String Sextet in E minor, Op. 25 (published 1874)

Holbrooke, Joseph

- String Sextet "Henry Vaughan" in D major, Op. 43/16 (1902)

Indy, Vincent d'

- Sextet for Strings in B♭ major, Op. 92

Kapp, Artur

- String Sextet (1951)

Koechlin, Charles

- Le portrait de Daisy Hamilton, Op. 140

Koessler, Hans

- String Sextet in F minor (published 1902)

Korndorf, Nikolai

- Mozart Variations for string sextet (1990)

Korngold, Erich

- String Sextet in D, Op. 10

Ledenev, Roman

- Elegiac Sextet for strings Op. 30 (1982)

Lewandowsky, Max

- String Sextet in C minor, Op. 5

Martinu, Bohuslav

- String Sextet H. 224 (1932)

Merikanto, Aarre

- String Sextet (1932) (reconstructed by Paavo Heininen, 1993)

Mosonyi, Mihály

- String Sextet in C minor

Mozart, Wolfgang Amadeus (sort-of):

- Grande Sestetto Concertante (1808 transcription of the Sinfonia Concertante for violin, viola and orchestra)

Penderecki, Krzysztof

- Ciaccona in memoriam Giovanni Paolo II (Ludwig) (2005)

Piston, Walter

- String Sextet

Rääts, Jaan

- String Sextet, Op. 98 (1997)

Räihälä, Osmo Tapio

- Blaze ("Roihu" for six cellos) (2014)

Raff, Joachim

- String Sextet in G minor, Op. 178 (1872)

Reger, Max

- String Sextet in F major, Op. 118

Rimsky-Korsakov, Nikolai

- String Sextet in A major (1876)

Rubinstein, Anton

- Sextet for strings in D major Op. 97 (1876)

Schoenberg, Arnold

- Verklärte Nacht (Transfigured Night), Op. 4 (1899)

Schulhoff, Erwin

- Sextet for strings (1920–24)

Spohr, Ludwig

- String Sextet in C major, Op. 140 (1848)

Stainlein, Louis Comte de

- String Sextet in G major, Op. 20

Stanchinsky, Aleksei

- Sextet for strings

Strauss, Richard

- Sextet for strings from the opera Capriccio

Tchaikovsky, Pyotr

- Souvenir de Florence for string sextet, Op. 70 (1890)

Vasks, Pēteris

- Spring Sonata for string sextet (1987)

Waterhouse, Graham

- String Sextet, Op. 1 (1979/2013)

Wilm, Nikolai von

- String Sextet Op. 27

Wuorinen, Charles

- String Sextet (1989)

== See also ==
- List of triple concertos for violin, cello, and piano
- String instrument repertoire
- List of solo cello pieces
- List of compositions for cello and piano
- List of compositions for cello and orchestra
- List of double concertos for violin and cello
