= String sextet =

Music composition for six instruments

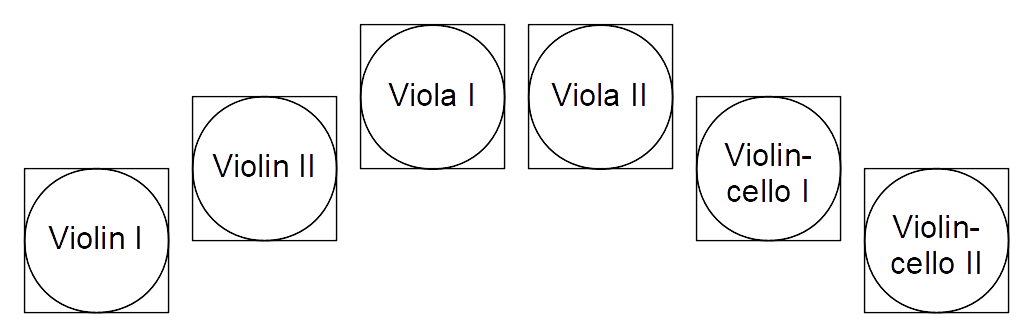
Example ensemble layout

In classical music, a string sextet is a composition written for six string instruments, or a group of six musicians who perform such a composition. Most string sextets have been written for an ensemble consisting of two violins, two violas, and two cellos.

== Notable string sextets ==
Among the earliest works in this form are the nine string sextets Op. 23 by Luigi Boccherini, written in 1776. Other notable string sextets include the String Sextets Op. 18 and 36 by Brahms, Dvořák's Op. 48, Tchaikovsky Souvenir de Florence, Op. 70, Schoenberg's Verklärte Nacht, Op. 4, Erich Wolfgang Korngold Op. 10, Erwin Schulhoff's String Sextet of 1924, and Charles Wuorinen's String Sextet of 1989.

== Less usual combinations ==
More unusual combinations for a string sextet:

- three violins, viola and two cellos: Ferdinand David (1810–1873), op. 38, Gaetano Brunetti (1744–1798), op. 1, Eugene Goossens (1893–1962), op. 37
- three violins, two violas and cello: Jan Brandts Buys (1868–1933), op. 40
- two violins, two violas, cello, double bass: Ignaz Pleyel (1757–1831) B.261, and others
- two violins, viola, two cellos, double bass: including works by Auguste Franchomme (1808–1884) and Ignacy Feliks Dobrzyński (1807–1867)

== Selected list of string sextets ==
- Luigi Boccherini (1743–1805) String Sextets, Op. 23 (1776)
- Alexander Borodin (1833–1887) String Sextet in D minor (2 movements) (1860/61)
- Hakon Børresen (1876–1954) Sextet in G major, Op. 5 (1901)
- Johannes Brahms (1833–1897)
  - String Sextet No. 1 in B♭ major, Op. 18 (33')
  - String Sextet No. 2 in G major, Op. 36 (33')
- Frank Bridge (1879–1941) String Sextet (1906–1912) (27')
- Karl Davydov (1838–1889) Sextet, Op. 35 (1880) dedicated to Leopold Auer
- Ignacy Feliks Dobrzyński (1807–67) Sextet in E♭ major, Op.39 (1845) (for 2 violins, viola, 2 cellos & bass)
- Ernő Dohnányi (1877–1960) String Sextet in B♭ major (1893, revised 1898) (27')
- Antonín Dvořák (1841–1904) String Sextet in A major, Op. 48, B. 80 (31')
- Iván Erőd (1936–2019)
  - Serenade for string sextet, Op. 45 (1983)
  - 2nd String Sextet, Op. 68 (1996)
- Eduard Franck (1817–1893)
  - String Sextet No. 1 in E♭, Op. 41 (1882)
  - String Sextet No. 2 in D major, Op. 50 (1894)
- Niels Gade (1871–1890) Sextet in E♭ major, Op. 44 (1865)
- Louis Glass (1864–1936) Sextet in G major, Op. 15 (1893)
- Reinhold Glière (1875–1956)
  - Sextet No. 1 in C minor (1898)
  - String Sextet No. 2 in B minor, Op. 7 (1904)
  - String Sextet No. 3 in C major, Op. 11 (1904)
- Heinrich Hofmann (1842–1902) Sextet Op. 25 (1874)
- Joseph Holbrooke (1878–1958) Sextet in D, Op. 43 (1924)
- Vincent d'Indy (1851–1931) String Sextet in B♭ major, Op. 92 (1927)
- Mauricio Kagel (1931–2008) String Sextet (1953, rev. 1957)
- Hans von Koessler (1853–1926) Sextet in F minor (1902)
- Erich Wolfgang Korngold (1897–1957) String Sextet in D major, Op. 10 (1917) (33')
- Arnold Krug (1849–1904) Sextet in D major, Op. 68
- Max Lewandowsky (1874–1906) Sextet, Op. 5 (1904)
- Bohuslav Martinů (1890–1959) String Sextet, H. 224 Paris, 1932 (15-16')
- Mihály Mosonyi (1815–1870) String Sextet in C minor (32')
- Per August Ölander (1824–1886) String Sextet (1876?)
- Walter Piston (1894–1976) String Sextet (1964) (18')
- Joachim Raff (1822–1882) Sextet in G minor, Op. 178 (1872)
- Max Reger (1873–1916) Sextet in F major, Op. 118 (1910)
- Friedhelm Rentzsch (born 1955) String Sextet (1981) (15')
- Nikolai Rimsky-Korsakov (1844–1908) String Sextet in A major (30')
- Paul Rosenbloom (born 1952) String Sextet (1978) (30')
- Anton Rubinstein (1829–1894) Sextet in D major, Op. 97
- Peter Schickele (born 1935) String Sextet (1990) (26')
- Arnold Schoenberg (1874–1951) Verklärte Nacht (Transfigured Night), Op. 4 (1899) (29')
- Erwin Schulhoff (1894–1942) String Sextet (1924) (21')
- Salvatore Sciarrino (born 1947) Sestetto (2003) (22')
- Louis Spohr (1784–1859) String Sextet in C major, Op. 140 (1848) (24')
- Richard Strauss (1864–1949) from the Opera Capriccio, Op. 85 (1942) (10')
- Pyotr Ilyich Tchaikovsky (1840–1893) Souvenir de Florence, Op. 70 (35')
- Graham Waterhouse (born 1962) String Sextet op. 1 (1979–2013)
- Nicolai von Wilm (1834–1911) Sextet in B minor, Op. 27 (1898)
- Ermanno Wolf-Ferrari (1876–1948) Sextet in C minor (1894-5)
- Charles Wuorinen (1938–2020) String Sextet (1989)

== See also ==
- String sextet repertoire – Compositions for six string instruments
- Sextet – Musical group that consists of 6 people
- String trio – Music written for three string players
- String quartet – Musical ensemble of four string players
- String quintet – Musical piece for five string players
- String octet – Music composition for eight instruments
