= Solo (music) =

Performance by a single musician

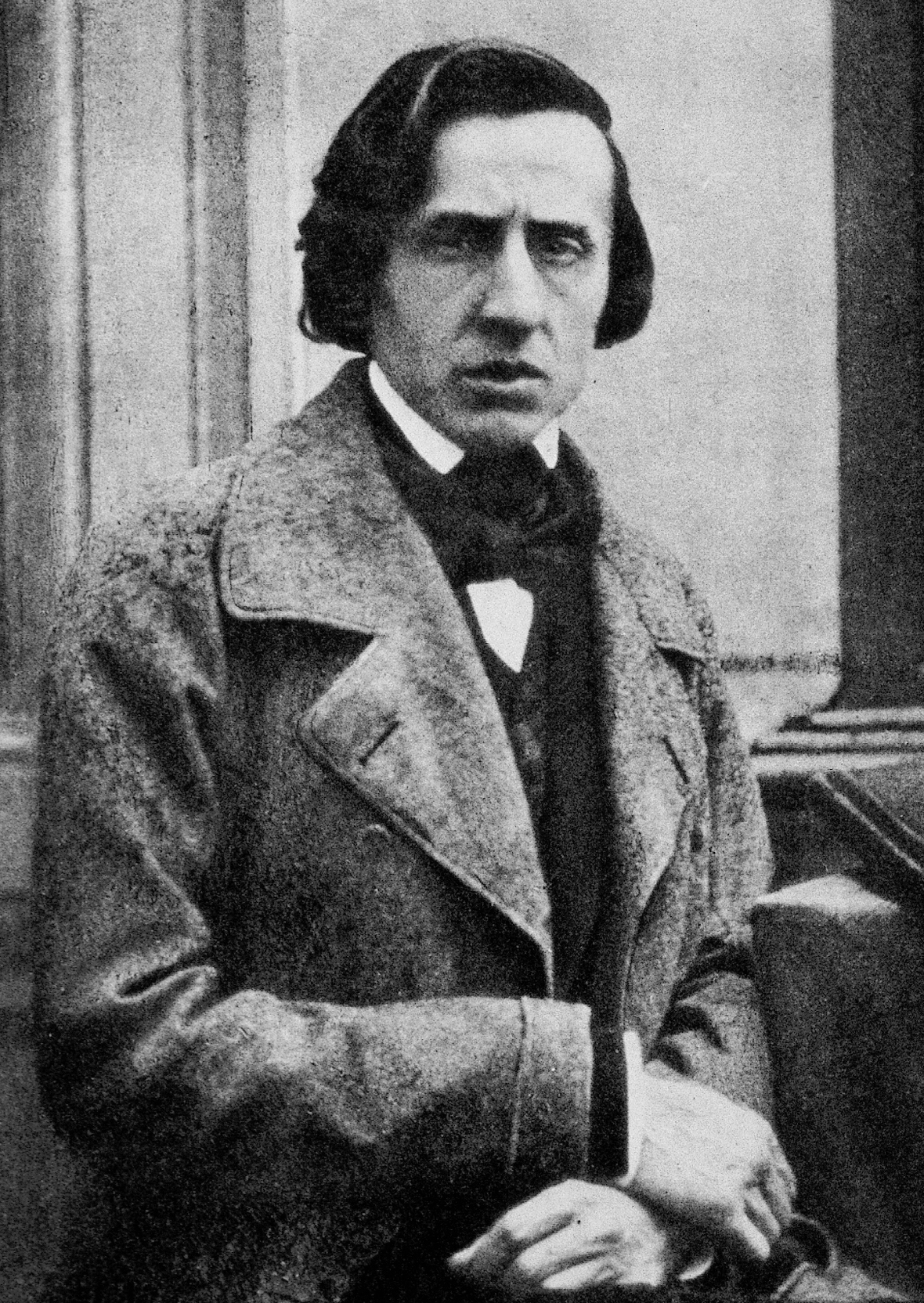
Frederic Chopin, soloist and composer.

In music, a solo (Italian for 'alone') is a piece or a section of a piece played or sung featuring a single performer, who may be performing completely alone or supported by an accompanying instrument such as a piano or organ, a continuo group (in Baroque music), or the rest of a choir, orchestra, band, or other ensemble. Performing a solo is "to solo", and the performer is known as a soloist.

The plural is soli or the anglicised form solos. In some contexts these are interchangeable, but the Italian form soli tends to be restricted to classical music and mostly either the solo performers or the solo passages in a single piece. Furthermore, the word soli can be used to refer to a small number of simultaneous parts assigned to single players in an orchestral composition. In the Baroque concerto grosso, the term for such a group of soloists was concertino.

In popular music, an instrumental solo is often used during a break or bridge to add interest and variety to a part of the song without lyrics.

== History ==
=== 18th century ===
In the Baroque and Classical periods, the word solo was virtually equivalent to sonata, and could refer either to a piece for one melody instrument with (continuo) accompaniment, or to a sonata for an unaccompanied melody instrument, such as Johann Sebastian Bach's sonatas for violin alone.

== See also ==
- Category:Solo music
- Cadenza
- Cello solo
- Concerto
- Drum solo
- Guitar solo
- Piano solo
- Tutti
- Violin solo
- Virtuoso
