= String instrument repertoire =

Set of available musical works for string instruments

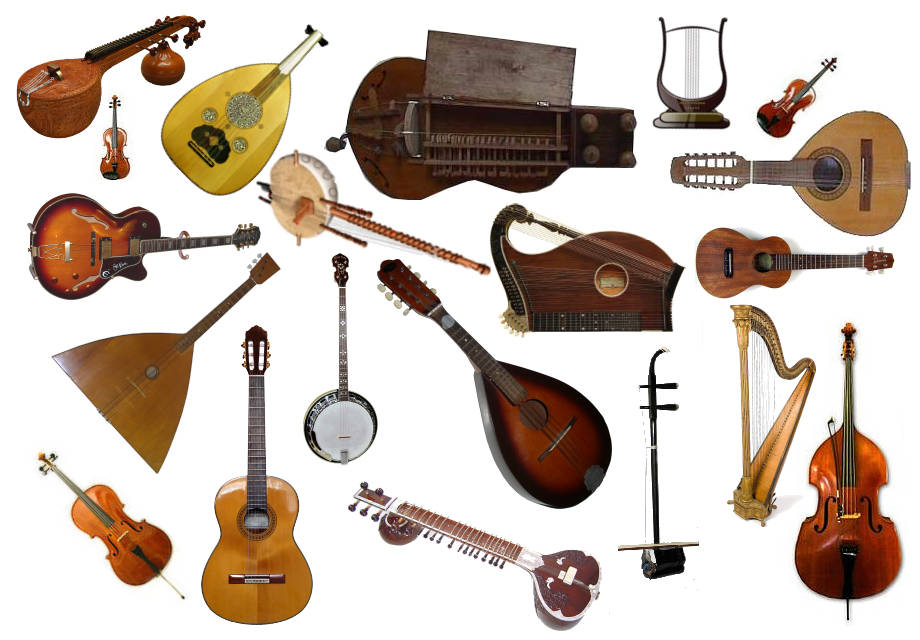
Selection of stringed musical instruments

This is a list of pages with repertoire for string instruments.

== Solo instruments ==
- Violin:
  - Violin solo
  - Violin and piano
  - Violin concertos
  - Violin duo
- Viola:
  - Viola solo
  - Viola and piano
  - Viola concertos
- Cello:
  - Cello solo
  - Cello and piano
  - Cello ensemble pieces
  - Cello concertos
- Double bass:
  - Double bass solo
  - Double bass and piano
  - Double bass concertos
- Guitar:
  - Guitar solo
  - Guitar duo
  - Guitar concertos
- Harp:
  - Harp solo
  - Harp concertos
- Harpsichord:
  - Harpsichord solo
  - Harpsichord concertos
- Piano:
  - Piano solo
  - Piano left-hand
  - Piano duo
  - Piano concertos
- Multiple solo instruments:
  - Double concerto for violin and cello
  - Triple concerto for violin, cello, and piano

== Chamber music ==
- Strings duos
- String trios
- String quartet
- String quintet
- String sextet
- String octet
- String decet
- Piano trio
- Piano quartet
- Piano quintet
- Piano sextet
