= Theodor Kirchner =

German pianist and composer (1823–1903)

- Kirchner, in the mid-19th century
- Born: Fürchtegott Theodor Kirchner; 10 December 1823; Neukirchen, Erzgebirgskreis, Saxony, German Confederation
- Died: 18 September 1903 (aged 79); Hamburg, German Empire
- Burial place: Ohlsdorf Cemetery
- Education: Conservatorium der Musik, Leipzig
- Occupations: Pianist; organist; composer; arranger; music educator
- Years active: 1843–1890
- Era: Romantic
- Notable work: Compositions
- Style: Classical; chamber

Fürchtegott Theodor Kirchner (10 December 1823 – 18 September 1903) was a German pianist and composer and pianist of the Romantic era.

== Biography ==
Kirchner was born at Neukirchen, near Chemnitz, and at the age of eight, was already an accomplished pianist and organist. From 1838 to 1842, he studied in Leipzig under Julius Knorr (piano) and Karl Ferdinand Becker (organ and theory). Kirchner subsequently was a pupil of Johann Gottlob Schneider in Dresden and attended the Leipzig Conservatory for a short time. In 1843, he became organist in Winterthur, Switzerland, on the recommendation of Mendelssohn. He remained there for nearly 20 years, but travelled much in Germany, befriending Robert and Clara Schumann and Brahms. Clara Schumann was very fond of him, though she wrote that "in his character there is no stability", and it appears they had a discreet affair in the early 1860s. In 1862, Kirchner moved to Zurich as the director of the subscription concerts there. This appointment lasted only three years.

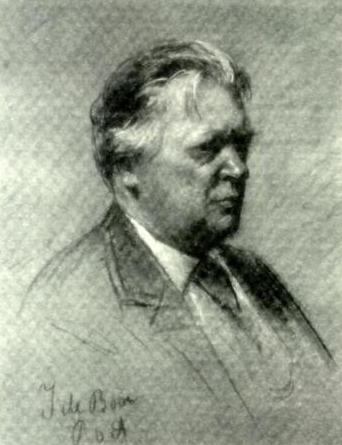
Pastel portrait of Kirchner by Julie de Boor, 1898

From 1862 to 1872, Kirchner taught in the music school at Zurich. He was married in 1868, but the marriage was not a success. After a spell as organist in Zurich, from 1870, he moved to Meiningen in 1872 to become court pianist; he was made director of the Conservatory in Würzburg the next year, serving until 1875. From 1876 to 1883, he lived in Leipzig, then taught score-reading in Dresden until 1890. In 1884, Brahms, Hanslick, Gade, Grieg and Hans von Bülow raised 30,000 marks to enable Kirchner to pay off his debts. In 1890, he abandoned his wife and family and moved to Hamburg, where he was looked after by a former pupil. Two strokes left him paralysed in 1894, and he became completely blind in his last years. He died in Hamburg on 18 September 1903, at the age of 79.

Kirchner enjoyed the friendship and admiration of many leading composers of the 19th century, including Mendelssohn, Robert Schumann (who wrote approvingly of him in Neue Zeitschrift für Musik), Brahms, Liszt, Wagner, Dvořák, and Grieg. Yet, he was unable to maintain a successful career, apparently due to a disorderly way of life which included extravagant spending and an addiction to gambling.

== Compositions and arrangements ==
Kirchner was a gifted arranger whose transcriptions include the realization of Brahms's first and second string sextet as piano trios; he also made the vocal score of Brahms's German Requiem and solo piano arrangements of the third and fourth sets of Hungarian Dances and the Liebeslieder Waltzes. As a composer, he was an intense romantic lyricist and a natural miniaturist—he is credited with having written over 1000 piano pieces (mainly collected in cycles), of which many are only a minute or so in duration—a kind of 19th-century forerunner of Webern's Bagatelles. His waltzes (opus 23, composed in 1876) are dedicated to Brahms, and the suite of "characteristic pieces" (Nachtbilder, opus 25) quotes Brahms's song "Wie bist du, meine Königin". There are also some organ pieces and songs and a few choral and chamber works, but no orchestral music at all, though his friend Heinrich Schulz-Beuthen made an orchestral suite out of some of his piano pieces. He was especially influenced by Robert Schumann's music, as in his Neue Davidsbündlertänze, Op. 17 (1874).

Kirchner's works have been republished by Amadeus in Winterthur since 1975.

== See also ==
- List of compositions by Theodor Kirchner
