= Heinrich Schulz-Beuthen =

German composer

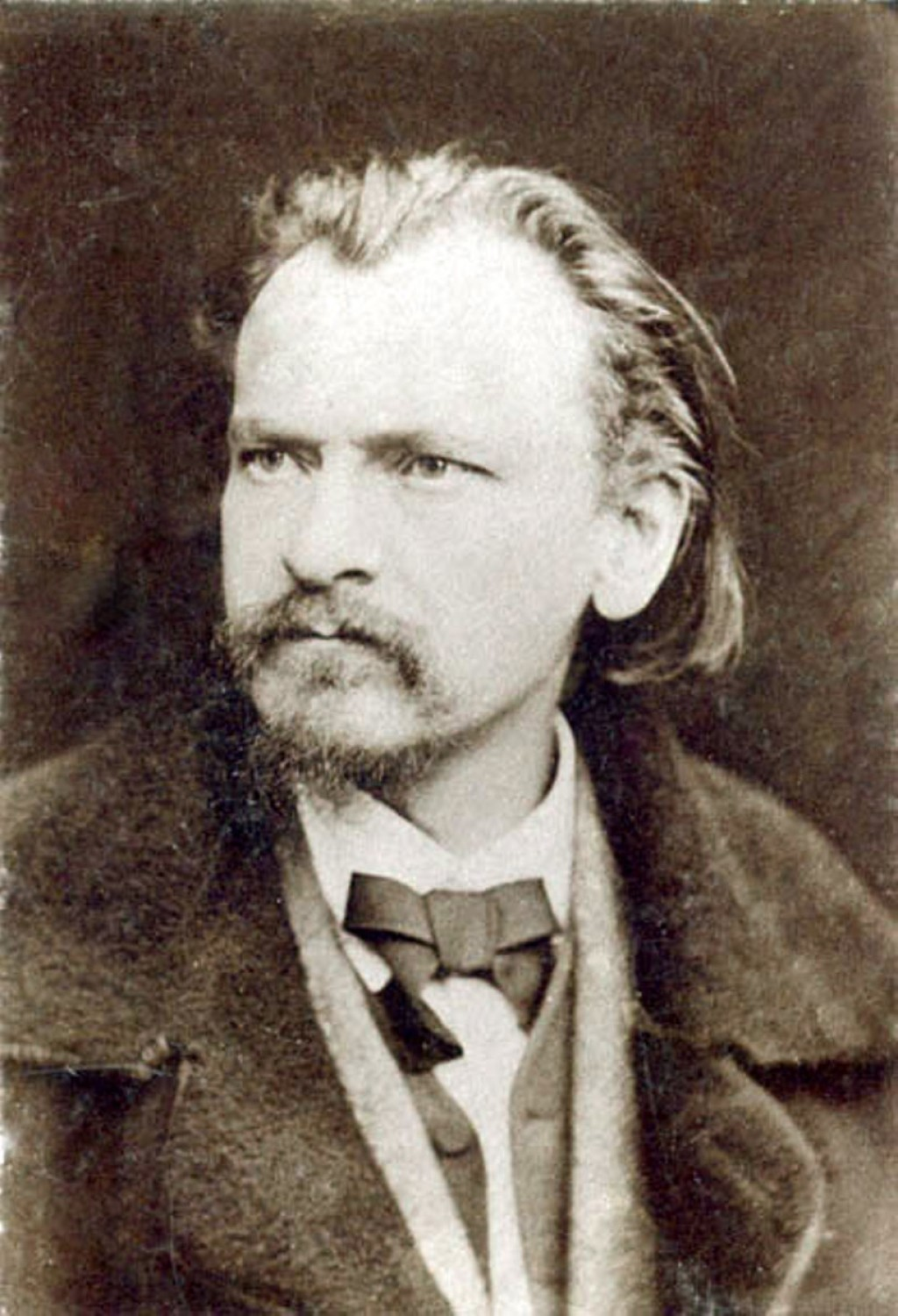

Heinrich Donatien Wilhelm Schulz-Beuthen (19 June 1838 in Beuthen, Upper Silesia (now Bytom, in Poland) – 12 March 1915 in Dresden) was a composer of the high Romantic era.

== Life ==
His original surname was Schulz: it was not unusual for people with such common surnames to add the name of their home town to distinguish themselves from others, as Schulz-Beuthen did at some point early in his career. He was intended for the profession of a chemist, and studied chemistry at the University of Breslau, but his drive to write music was greater. From 1862 to 1865 he studied with Ignaz Moscheles and Carl Reinecke at the Leipzig Conservatory, where Edvard Grieg and Johan Svendsen were among his fellow students; he also studied privately with Carl Riedel. Finding Leipzig's classicism uncongenial to his more romantic temperament, after his graduation Schulz-Beuthen left Germany for Switzerland, where he taught composition in Zurich from 1866 to 1880. In Switzerland he met Richard Wagner, the novelist Gottfried Keller, and was befriended by Mathilde Wesendonck. He also became friends with the composer Theodor Kirchner, an important member of the Schumann-Brahms circle, and created an orchestral cycle out of arrangements of some of Kirchner's piano pieces. Following a nervous breakdown (the details of which are not precisely known) Schulz-Beuthen returned to Germany; he was unable to compose for several years, but resumed his teaching activities in Dresden, where he lived – except for a short period spent in Vienna, 1893-95 – from 1881 until his death on 12 March 1915. His last years were spent in an asylum.

== Works ==
Schulz-Beuthen was a copious composer: his works include five operas, of which the first, Der Zauberschlaf, after a play by Mathilde Wesendonck, combined the stories of Sleeping Beauty and Cinderella and may well be the first example of the "fairy tale opera" which became a popular genre in the late 19th century at the hands, most notably, of Humperdinck. Unfortunately the music is lost, as are many other of Schulz-Beuthen's works. He wrote no fewer than ten symphonies (of which the first and last remained incomplete). Symphony No. 6 was inspired by Shakespeare's King Lear; he initially wrote incidental music to the play, later using the material for a symphony with men's chorus. He also wrote symphonic poems founded on such subjects as Schiller's Wilhelm Tell, Grillparzer's Des Meeres und der Liebe Wellen, and Böcklin's painting Isle of the Dead. (Schulz-Beuthen's treatment, one of his last works, is almost exactly contemporary with Sergei Rachmaninoff's well-known tone-poem on the same subject.) Other compositions included a Requiem, scenes from Goethe's Faust, a piano concerto, a wind octet, string quintet and trio, choral works, numerous songs, piano pieces and so on.

He had some distinguished admirers, including Franz Liszt, and contemporary critics sometimes found his music daringly modern: however, these judgements were passed mainly on works that are no longer available for examination. The bulk of Schulz-Beuthen's music was never published, and it is believed that most of his manuscripts were destroyed in the fire-bombing of Dresden in 1945. Nevertheless, enough was printed during his lifetime, or has come to light in recent years, to indicate a composer of considerable gifts.

== Discography ==
- Heinrich Schulz-Beuthen, Piano Music, Kirsten Johnson, piano, Guild GMCD 7277
- Hermann Goetz and Heinrich Schulz-Beuthen, Piano Music, Kirsten Johnson, piano, Guild GMCD 7282
