= String octet =

Music composition for eight instruments

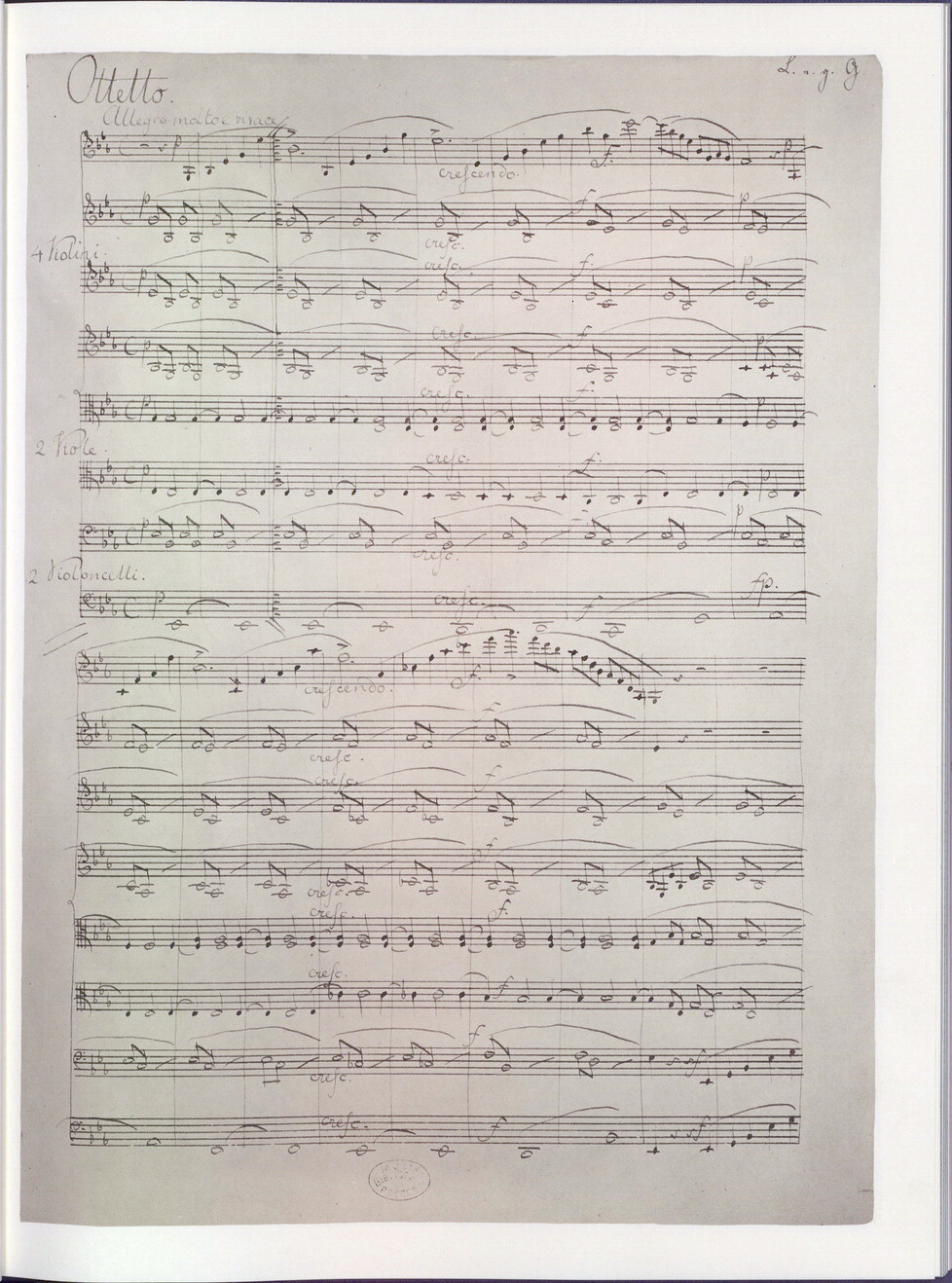
First page of the autograph manuscript score of Mendelssohn's String Octet

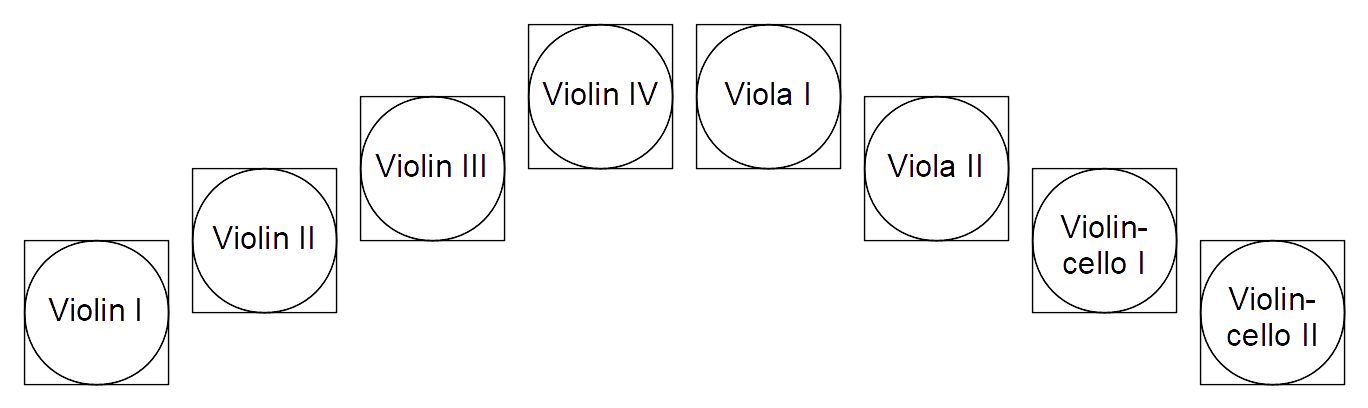
One possible ensemble layout

A string octet is a piece of music written for eight string instruments, or sometimes the group of eight players. It usually consists of four violins, two violas and two cellos, or four violins, two violas, a cello and a double bass.

== Notable string octets ==
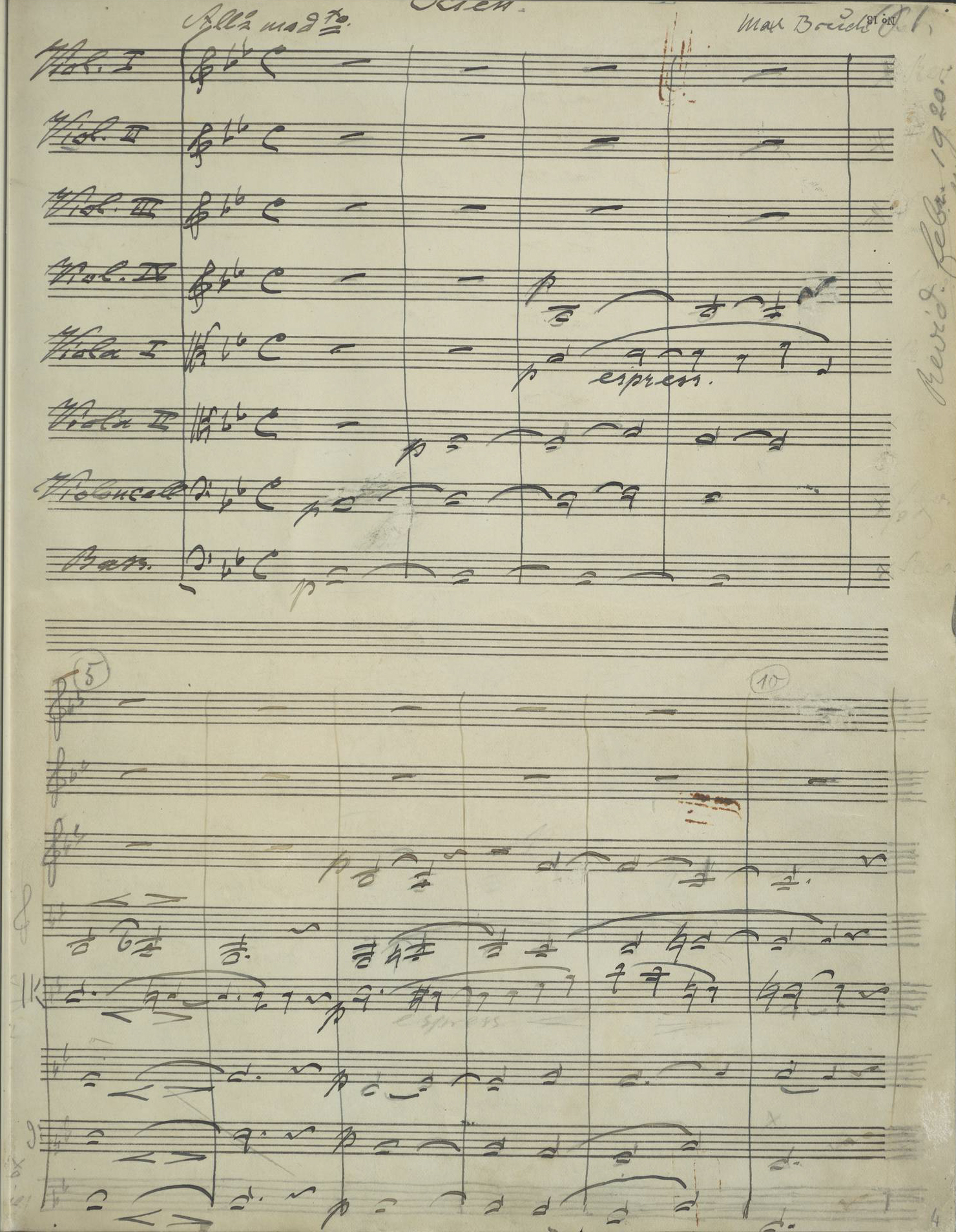
First page of the autograph manuscript score of Bruch's String Octet

Most frequently performed string octets include:

- Felix Mendelssohn – Octet, Op. 20
- Max Bruch – String Octet in B♭ major (with bass replacing the second cello)

Other string octets include:

- Airat Ichmouratov – Octet for strings in G minor "Letter from an Unknown Woman"
- Luciano Berio – Korót (eight cellos)
- Sylvano Bussotti – Poésies à Maldoror (eight cellos)
- George Enescu – Octet in C major, Op. 7
- Niels Gade – String Octet in F major, Op. 17
- Reinhold Glière – String Octet in D Major, Op. 5
- Cristóbal Halffter – Fandango (eight cellos)
- Gordon Jacob
  - Suite (eight violas)
  - Cello Octet (eight cellos)
- Tomás Marco – Miró (eight cellos)
- Darius Milhaud – Octet for Strings, Op. 291
- Arvo Pärt
  - Fratres (version for eight cellos)
  - L'abbé Agathon (eight cellos)
- Joachim Raff - String Octet Op. 176
- Osmo Tapio Räihälä – Swarm
- Steve Reich – Cello Counterpoint (eight cellos)
- Kaija Saariaho – Neiges (eight cellos)
- Gunther Schuller – Hommage a Rayechka (eight cellos)
- Peter Sculthorpe – Chorale (eight cellos)
- Dmitri Shostakovich – Two Pieces for String Octet
- Giovanni Sollima – Violoncelles, vibrez! (eight cellos)
- Louis Spohr – Double Quartets Op. 65, 77, 87, 136
- Johan Svendsen – String Octet in A major, Op. 3

== See also ==
- String trio – Music written for three string players
- String quartet – Musical ensemble of four string players
- String quintet – Musical piece for five string players
- String sextet – Music composition for six instruments
- Violin octet – String instrument family
