= List of solo violin pieces =

This is a non-exhaustive list of pieces for solo violin. See also the entries on violin and the List of compositions for violin and orchestra and list of compositions for violin and piano.

Ordering is by surname of composer.

== A ==
- Anonymous
  - Spanish Ballad (Romance, transcription for violin solo by Ruggiero Ricci)
  - Klagenfurt Manuscript (collection of 96 short pieces from c. 1685)
- Joseph Achron
  - Dans l'intimité, Op. 19 (1909) (1. Improvisation; 2. Plaisanterie musicale sur l'air populaire 'Oh, du lieber Augustin')
- Miguel del Aguila
  - Cutting Limes, for solo violin
- Georges Aperghis
  - The Only Line, for solo violin
- Lera Auerbach
  - par.ti.ta, I-X, for violin solo (2007)

== B ==
- Grażyna Bacewicz
  - Sonata (No. 0) for solo violin (1929) -early work, no number-
  - Sonata No. 1 for solo violin (1941)
  - Sonata No. 2 for solo violin (1958)
  - Four Caprices for Violin Solo
  - Polish Caprice (1949)
- Johann Sebastian Bach
  - 3 Sonatas and 3 Partitas, for solo violin:
    - Sonata No. 1 in G minor, BWV 1001
    - Partita No. 1 in B minor, BWV 1002
    - Sonata No. 2 in A minor, BWV 1003
    - Partita No. 2 in D minor, BWV 1004
    - Sonata No. 3 in C major, BWV 1005
    - Partita No. 3 in E major, BWV 1006
  - Fantasia and Fugue in G minor, BWV 542 (transcription for violin solo by Tedi Papavrami, 2010)
  - Toccata and Fugue in D minor, BWV 565 (transcription for violin solo by Bruce Fox-Lefriche)
- Thomas Baltzar
  - Preludes and dances for solo violin
- Béla Bartók
  - Sonata for solo violin, Sz. 117, BB 124 (1944) (I. Tempo di ciaccona; II. Fuga (Risoluto, non troppo vivo); III. Melodia (Adagio); IV. Presto)
- Bruno Bartolozzi
  - "Variazioni" per violino solo (1957)
  - "Due studi" for violin
- George Benjamin
  - "Three Miniatures", for solo violin (2001):
    - 1. A Lullaby for Lalit
    - 2. A Canon for Sally
    - 3. Lauer Lied
- Paul Ben-Haim (b. Paul Frankenburger)
  - Sonata in G major, for violin solo
- Luciano Berio
  - Sequenza VIII, per violino solo (1976)
- Charles Auguste de Bériot
  - 10 Studi o Capricci, Op. 9 -ded. Baillot-
  - 6 Etudes brillantes pour le violon avec accompagnement de Piano (ad libitum), Op. 17
  - 3 Caprices for Violin, Op. 36
  - 3 Etudes caracteristiques, Op. 37 (1. Le Tourbillon; 2. L’Angelus; 3. La Sauterelle)
  - 9 Studies, for violin solo (1. Allegro agitato; 2. Allegro moderato; 3. Moderato; 4. Energico; 5. Melody: Largo; 6. Gulnare: Andantino; 7. March: Moderato; 8. Allegro vivace; 9. In imitation of the old masters: Moderato)
  - 12 Scènes ou Caprices, Op. 109 (1. La Separation; 2. La Polka; 3. Le Lezard; 4. Le Depart; 5. La Fougue; 6. La Banniere; 7. Le Caprice; 8. Saltarella; 9. La Reine; 10. Marche Russe; 11. L'inquietude; 12. La Consolation)
  - 12 Etudes Caractéristiques, Op. 114
  - 60 Etudes de Concert, Op. 123
  - Prélude ou Improvisation, for violin solo, Op. post.
- Lennox Berkeley
  - Introduction and Allegro, for Solo Violin (1949) -edited by Ivry Gitlis-
- Charles Harold Bernstein
  - Rhapsodie Israélienne, for solo violin (1984) -dedicated to Ivry Gitlis-
  - Romantic Suite, for solo violin (1984) (I. A huit heure; II. La commande; III. Presto ma non troppo; IV. Poème trascendental)
- Heinrich Ignaz Franz Biber
  - Passacaglia in G minor -Rosary Sonata No.16-
- Carlo Bignami
  - 12 Capricci per violino solo (c.1948)
- Rainer Bischof
  - Hawa Nashira Acht Variationen für Violine solo, op. 31 (1991)
- Alexander Blechinger
  - Stimmungen für Violine Solo Op. 94
- Ernest Bloch
  - Suite No. 1, for solo violin (1958) (I. Prelude; II. Andante tranquillo; III. Allegro; IV. Andante; V. Allegro energico)
  - Suite No. 2, for solo violin (1958) (I. Energico deciso; II. Moderato; III. Andante; IV. Allegro molto; V. Mélodie. Moderato)
  - Nigun (arranged for solo violin by Jorge Bosso)
- Emil Bohnke
  - Solosonate Op. 13 Nr. 1 (1924)
  - Präludium und Ciacona Op. 15 Nr. 2 (1924)
- William Bolcom
  - Suite No. 1, for solo violin (1977) -to Sergiu Luca- (1. Prelude; 2. Perpetuum mobile; 3. Valse obsédée; 4. Sarabande; 5. Presto possibile)
  - Suite No. 2, for solo violin (2011) -to Gil Shaham- (1. Morning music; 2. Dancing in place; 3. Northern Nigun; 4. Lenny in spats; 5. Tempo di gavotte; 6. Barcarolle; 7. Fuga malinconica; 8. Tarantella; 9. Even music)
  - Suite No. 3, for solo violin (2018) -commissioned by the "International Violin Competition of Indianapolis"- (in 7 movements)
- Csiky Boldizsár
  - Passacaglia (Thema with Variations) for Solo Violin
- Nimrod Borenstein
  - Quasi una Cadenza for solo violin, Op. 26 (2002)
  - Kaddish for solo violin, Op. 78 (2018)
- Stephen Brown
  - Suite No. 1 for solo violin "Takkakaw Falls" (2003/04)
  - Four Romances and a Lunch, 5 movements for solo violin (2005)
  - Suite No. 2 for solo violin "There Was a Lady in the East" (2007)

== C ==
- John Cage
  - "Cheap Imitation" (1977)
  - "Chorals" (1978) -from Erik Satie's Douze petits chorals-
  - "Eight Whiskus" (1985)
  - "One^{6}" (1990)
  - "One^{10}" (1992)
  - (32) "Freeman Etudes":
    - Book 1 & 2, (Etudes No. 1-16) (1980)
    - Book 3 & 4, (Etudes No. 17-32) (1990)
- Bartolomeo Campagnoli
  - Divertissements, per violino solo
  - 30 Preludes (in all keys), per violino solo (rev./ed. H.Wessel)
- Julian Carrillo
  - Sonata No.1 para violin solo en Mi menor "a Paganini" (1939)
- Elliott Carter
  - "Four Lauds", for solo violin:
    - I. Statement – Remembering Aaron (1999)
    - II. Riconoscenza per Goffredo Petrassi (1984)
    - III. Rhapsodic Musings (2000)
    - IV. Fantasy – Remembering Roger (1999)
  - Cadenza for First Violin, in: String Quartet No. 2 (1959)
- Luke Cissell
  - Infinite Progress (2014)
- Azio Corghi
  - Petit Caprice (style Offenbach), per violino solo (1992)
- Gloria Coates
  - Sonata, for solo violin (2000) (I. Prelude; II. Fantasia; III. Berceuse; IV. Hornpipe)
- John Corigliano
  - "The Red Violin" Caprices, for solo violin (1999)
  - "Stomp", for solo violin (2010) -employs scordatura tuning-
- John Craton
  - Sonata for Solo Violin (2007)

== D ==
  - Bergamasques (2013)
- Edison Denisov
  - Sonata for violin solo (1978)
- Joël-François Durand
  - Roman for violin solo (1982)
- Melissa Dunphy
  - Kommós (2011)

== E ==
- Gottfried von Einem
  - Solosonate für Violine, Op. 47
- Anders Eliasson
  - "In medias" for violin solo (1971)
- George Enescu
  - "Airs Dans Le Genre Roumain", for solo violin (1926)
  - "Fantaisie Concertante", for solo violin (1932: arr. Sherban Lupu)
  - "The Fiddler", for solo violin (ed. Sherban Lupu)
  - "Prélude à l'unisson", for solo violin (1st movement from "Suite No. 1 for Orchestra" in C major Op. 9)
  - "Sarabande", for solo violin (ed. Sherban Lupu)
  - "Ménétrier", for solo violin (1st movement from "Impressions d'enfance" Op. 28 (1940))
- Heinrich Wilhelm Ernst
  - 6 Études à plusieurs parties (6 Polyphonic Studies / 6 mehrstimmige Studien) for Violin Solo (publ. 1864):
    - 1. in F major
    - 2. in A major
    - 3. in E major
    - 4. in C major
    - 5. in E♭ major
    - 6. Variations de concert sur l’air irlandaise The Last Rose of Summer, in G major
  - Grand Caprice on Schubert's Der Erlkönig, D. 328, Op. 26 (1854) -transcription for solo violin-
- Iván Erőd
  - Drei Stücke für Violine solo, Op. 27 (1979)
  - "GeburtstagsPRÄSENT dem treuen Freund GErHArD", o.Op. (2007)

== F ==
- Sebastian Fagerlund
  - Materie for solo violin
- Luboš Fišer (1896–1967)
  - Sonata for solo violin "In memoriam Terezin" (1981)
- Federigo Fiorillo (1755–1823)
  - 36 Études ou caprices pour violon, Op.3
- Urs Joseph Flury (b. 1941)
- Richard Flury (1896–1967)
  - 10 Capricen für solo violine (1950/52) (1. Allegro molto; 2. Prestissimo; 3. Andantino; 4. Allegro; 5. Moderato; 6. Allegro moderato; 7. Allegro; 8. Vivace; 9. Allegro; 10. Vivace)
- Urs Joseph Flury (b. 1941)
  - Sonate für Violine solo (1976) (1. Fantasia; 2. Interludium; 3. Habanera; 4. Perpetuum mobile)
- Jean Françaix (1912–1997)
  - Theme and 8 Variations, for violin solo (1980) -dedicated to Mikhail Goldstein-
- Joel Phillip Friedman
  - Uncle Hokum's Fiddle for solo violin (2013), Grey Bird Music
- Dai Fujikura
  - "Samarasa" for solo violin (2010)

== G ==
- Antonio García
  - Your room at midnight (2018)
- Francesco Geminiani
  - Violin Solo Sonata in B♭ major (ed. Mario Corti) (I. Adagio, con fantasia; II. Vivace; III. Affetuoso; IV. Giga. Allegro)
  - Violin Solo in C major
- Robert Gerhard
  - Chaconne for solo violin (1959)
- Vittorio Giannini
  - Violin Solo Sonata No. 1 (1940) -dedicated to Ruggiero Ricci- (I. Praeludium con bravura; II. Cantabile; III. Allegro)
- Philip Glass
  - "Strung Out", for solo amplified violin (1967)
  - "Knee Play 2", violin solo from Einstein On The Beach
  - Partita for solo violin (2010/11) -dedicated to Tim Fain- (I. Opening; II. Dance 1; III. Chaconne, Part 1; IV, Morning Song; V. Chaconne, Part 2; VI. Dance 2; VII. Evening Song)
- Benjamin Godard
  - Sonata No. 1 for violin solo in B minor, Op. 20
  - Sonata No. 2 for violin solo in A minor, Op. Posth.
- Jorge Grundman
  - Terezin Through the Eyes of the Children (2012)
  - Shoah for Solo Violin and Sacred Temple (2016): (I. Yom HaShoah; II. Ghetto Warszawskie; III. Terezín Through the Eyes of the Children; IV. Babi Yar; V. Bergen-Belsen; VI. The Last Breath)

== H ==
- George Frideric Handel
  - Allegro in G major for solo violin, HWV 407 (c. 1738)
- Edward W. Hardy
  - "Mama, now I can breathe", for solo violin (2020) (dedicated to George Floyd)
  - Evolution, for solo Violin (2019) (inspired by the Evolution of Black Music)
  - Nevermore for solo violin (2018) (first movement from "Three Pieces Inspired by Edgar Allan Poe")
  - Swans at the Shore, for solo violin (2017) (from the production of "Lake of Sorrows")
  - Odette and Siegfried’s First Dance, for solo violin (2017) (from the production of "Lake of Sorrows")
  - Making the Perfect Dress, for solo violin (2017) (from the production of "Lake of Sorrows")
  - Ship at Sea, for solo violin (2016) (from the production of "The Pearl Diver")
  - The Lovers Dance, for solo violin (2016) (from the production of "The Pearl Diver")
  - The Woodsman (Musical Score), for solo violin (2012) (from the production of "The Woodsman")
- Karl Amadeus Hartmann
  - Sonata No. 1, for solo violin (1927) (I. Toccata. Sehr lebhafte Achtel; II. Ruhige Viertel, sehr fliessend; III. Verrückt schnell, unschön spielen!!; IV. Breit!! Mit viel Ausdruck; V. Fuge (Toccata). Heiter, burschikos)
  - Sonata No. 2, for solo violin (1927) (I. Langsam, breite Achtel. Sehr lebhaft und kräftig; II. Variationen über eine rhythmische Idee:...; III. Sehr langsame Achtel mit viel Empfindung; IV. Fuge. Sehr wild und roh im Vortrag (schnelle...)
  - Suite No. 1, for solo violin (1927) (I. Canon. Lebhaft; II. Fuge. Munter!; III. Rondo. Nicht zu schnell; IV. Dreiteilige Liedform. Breit; V. Ciaccona: Lebhaft)
  - Suite No. 2, for solo violin (1927) (I. Lebhaft; II. Fliessend; III. Stürmisch; IV. Jazz Tempo, sehr robust. Presto)
- Hans Werner Henze
  - Sonata for violin solo (1977)
- Kenneth Hesketh
  - Les Grandes Plaines du Jour for solo violin (2005)
- Paul Hindemith
  - Sonata for Solo Violin (No. 1) in G minor, Op. 11/6 (1917/18) (I. Mäßig Schnell; II. Siziliano, Mäßig bewegt; III. Finale, Lebhaft)
  - Sonata for Solo Violin (No. 2), Op. 31/1 (1924) (I. Sehr lebhafte Achtel; II. Sehr langsame Viertel; III. Sehr lebhafte Viertel; IV. Intermezzo, Lied ganz leise und zart su spielen; V. Prestissimo)
  - Sonata for Solo Violin (No. 3), Op. 31/2 (1924) (I. Leichte bewegte Viertel; II. Ruhig bewegte Achtel; III. Gemächliche Viertel; IV. 5 Variationen über das Lied "Komm, lieber Mai" v.Mozart. Leicht bewegt)
- Gilad Hochman
  - Variations for violin solo (2003)
  - Moment Before... for violin solo (2005)
- Heinz Holliger
  - Trema (1981, rev. 1983)
  - Souvenirs de Davos -No. 2 for solo violin- (1999/2000)
  - Soli, for violin (2000/01)
  - Souvenirs trémaësques, version for violin (2000, rev. 2009)
  - Ri-Tratto, for violin (2011)
  - Drei kleine Szenen, für Violine solo (2014)
- Arthur Honegger
  - Sonata for solo violin (1940)
- Peter Hristoskov
  - Suite for Solo Violin No. 1, Op. 7 -dedicated to Igor Bezrodny-
  - Suite for Solo Violin No. 2, Op. 13 -dedicated to Vladimir Avramov-
- Jenő Hubay
  - 6 Etudes for the Development of Bow Technique -pedagogical work-, Op.63 (1896)
  - 6 Etudes for the Development of Left-Hand Technique -pedagogical work-, Op.64 (1896)
  - 10 Concertant Etudes (Tíz koncertetűd), Op.89 (1900)
- Jordan Hunt
  - Two, Alone for Solo Violin (2022)
- David Hush
  - Sonata for Violin Solo (1976)
  - Shir Eres (Lullaby) (1993)
  - Lachash (Incantation) (1995)
  - Sephardic Song (2003)

== I ==
- Jacques Ibert
  - Caprilena, for solo violin (1950/51)

== J ==
- Joseph Joachim
  - Scottish Melody, for solo violin
- André Jolivet
  - Suite rhapsodique (1965), pour violon seul [1.Preludio; 2.Aria I; 3.Intermezzo; 4.Aria II; 5.Finale]

== K ==
- Ejnar Kanding (b. 1965)
  - Berge des Urleids (1998–99), solo violin & live electronics (using Max software)
- Aram Khachaturian
  - Sonata-Monologue, for unaccompanied violin (1975)
- Giselher Klebe
  - Sonate No. 1 für Violine Solo
  - Sonate No. 2 für Violine Solo (1955)
- Richard Rudolf Klein
  - Meditation (on the theme: Veni Creator Spiritus)
- Ernst-Lothar von Knorr
  - Partita für Violine solo in G minor (1946)
- Fritz Kreisler
  - Recitative and Scherzo-Caprice Op. 6, for solo violin (1910)
  - Study on a Choral “in the style of Johann Stamitz”, in G major, for solo violin (publ. 1930)
  - Austrian Imperial Hymn "Gott erhalte unseren Kaiser" (transcribed for solo violin by Kreisler, 1915)
- Ernst Krenek
  - Sonata No. 1 for solo violin, Op. 33 (1925)
  - Sonata No. 2 for solo violin, Op. 115 (1948)
- Rodolphe Kreutzer
  - 42 Studies or Caprices for the Violin (publ. 1796; ed./rev. Edmund Singer, 1894)

== L ==
- Ana Leira Carnero
  - Adagio for Solo Violin (2022)
- Yury Levitin
  - Variations on a Theme by Glinka (collaborative work – 11 Variations by leading Soviet composers on "Vania's Song" from the Opera "Ivan Susanin". One Variation each by Dmitri Kabalevsky, Eugen Kapp, Andrei Eshpai, Rodion Shchedrin, Georgi Sviridov and Yury Levitin; two by Vissarion Shebalin; and three by Dmitri Shostakovich), Op.45 (1957)
- Franz Liszt
  - Sonata in B minor (transcription for solo violin by Noam Sivan, 2007)
  - Mephisto Waltz No. 1 "Der Tanz in der Dorfschenke", S. 514 (LW A189) for violin solo (arr. Nathan Milstein)
- Pietro Locatelli
  - "The Harmonic Labyrinth", 24 Caprices (Cadenzas from 12 Violin Concertos "Il Labirinto armonico" Op.3)
- Charles Martin Loeffler (1861–1935)
  - Danse bizarre, pour violon seul (1851)
- Theo Loevendie
  - Dance (1986)

== M ==
- Bruno Maderna
  - "Widmung" (1967)
  - "Pièce pour Ivry" (1971) (dedicated to Ivry Gitlis)
- Riccardo Malipiero
  - "Hommage II" (1987) (hommage to Rodolfo Lipizer)
- Jean Martinon
  - Sonatina No. 5, for solo violin, Op.32/1 (1942)
  - Sonatina No. 6, for solo violin (1958)
- Donald Martino
  - Romanza (2000)
  - Sonata (2003)
- Gerardo Matos Rodríguez
  - "La Cumparsita" (arrangement for solo violin by Vicente Zito; edited by Ruggiero Ricci)
- Nicola Matteis
  - 2 Fantasie
- Peter Maxwell Davies
  - Sonata for violin alone (2013)
- Pavle Merkù
  - Calmo espressivo, per violino solo
- Ernst Hermann Meyer
  - 6 Preludes for solo violin (1966/1973):
    - No.1 – Allegro
    - No.2 – Adagio
    - No.3 – Allegro assai
    - No.4 – Andantino liberamente
    - No.5 – Allegro
    - No.6 – Andante sempre un poco rubato
- Darius Milhaud
  - "Sonatina pastorale" for violin solo, Op.383 (1960)
- Nathan Milstein
  - Paganiniana (Variations)
  - Mephisto Waltz (freely arranged from Franz Liszt's Mephisto Waltz No.1 "Der Tanz in der Dorfschenke" S.514)
- Konstantin G. Mostras
  - Esquisse No.2 (published in The Strad magazine, 2006)
  - Caprice (Recitativ and Toccata), for violin solo
- Fred Momotenko
  - Eneato, for solo violin or viola (2003)
- Alexander Müllenbach
  - Capriccio per Niccolò Paganini, for solo violin (1994)
- Missy Mazzoli
  - Dissolve, O my Heart (2010)

== N ==
- Pietro Nardini
  - 30 Caprices for solo violin, IPN 2 (Ed. Andreas Moser, 1925) -from the Berlin State Library, Manuscript No.15861-
- Lior Navok
  - In Memoriam (Yizkor), (2023)
- Carl Nielsen
  - Praeludium og Tema med Variationer, Op. 48, FS.104 (1923)
  - Preludio e Presto, Op. 52, FS.128 (1927/28)

== O ==
- Giovanni Ocio
  - Bagatella per ogni sorta di instrumento in chiave di sol (1901)

== P ==
- Niccolò Paganini
  - 24 Caprices for solo violin, in the form of études (dedicated: Alli Artisti) Op.1, MS 25 (1818 ant.)
  - "Duo merveille", Sonata for solo violin, in C major MS 6 (1805/9)
  - Introduction and variations on "Nel cor più non mi sento" from La molinara by Giovanni Paisiello, MS 44 (1827) -also with guitar accompaniment-
  - "Capriccio" (Andante) in G major, MS 54 (1828)
  - "God Save The King" Variations on the English national anthem, Op.9, MS 56 (1829)
  - "Caprice d'adieu" (a.k.a. Farewell Caprice – dedicated: A mon ami M. E. Eliason), MS 68 (1833c)
  - 60 Variations on the Genoese folksong "Barucabà" Op.14, MS 71 for violin solo -also with guitar accompaniment- (1835) (Part I: Thema, in A major, with 20 Variations | Part II: Thema, in C major, with 20 Variations | Part III: Thema, in D major, with 20 Variations)
  - "Valtz" for violin solo, MS 80
  - "Inno patriottico" (Patriotic hymn), Allegro and 6 Variations in A major, MS 81 -also with guitar accompaniment-
  - "Tema variato", Theme and 7 Variations in A major, MS 82
  - "Sonata" for solo violin in A major, MS 83
  - 4 Studies, for solo violin
  - 6 Preludes, for solo violin
- Gérard Pape
  - "Le Fleuve du Désir IV" (1994–2002)
- Hilda Paredes
  - "Permutaciones", for solo violin (1978)
- Krzysztof Penderecki
  - Cadenza, for solo violin or viola (1984)
  - Capriccio, for solo violin (2008)
- Mario Peragallo (1910–1996)
  - Piece from "Emircal" (1980) for violin and tape (violin plays 3 lines)
- Paolo Pessina (b.1969)
  - Divertimento Op.3 for violin solo (1994) (I. Preludio; II. Ciaccona; III. Capriccio; IV. Danzante; V. Variazioni: Thema – Var.I-XIV – Fuga)
  - Suite No.1 for solo violin
  - Suite No.2 in D minor, a violino solo senza basso (2010/11) (I. Prelude; II. Double en Courant; III. Saraband; IV. Valse perdu; V. Rigodon)
  - Suite No.3 for solo violin
- Goffredo Petrassi
  - Elogio per un'ombra, per violino solo "per Alfredo Casella venticinque anni dopo" (1971) (I. In tempo adagio; II. Quasi presto; III. Libero, quasi adagio)
- Astor Piazzolla
  - 6 Tango Etudes, for violin (or flute) solo
- Johann Georg Pisendel
  - Sonata in A minor, for solo violin (1730)
- Hermann Markus Preßl
  - "YLOP", für Geige allein (1992) -experimental-
- Sergei Prokofiev
  - Sonata for solo violin in D major, Op. 115 (1947) (I. Moderato; II. Andante dolce. Tema con variazioni; III. Con brio. Allegro precipitato)
- Zoltan Paulinyi
  - Entre Serras e Cerrado (1995)
  - Flausiniana (1996)
  - Abstrato (2003)
  - Acalanto No. 1 (2003)
- Gerhard Präsent
  - Sonata regina per S.F. (1987)

== Q ==
- Manuel Quiroga
  - Estudio
  - (6) Etudes-Caprices:
    - No.1 (1936)
    - No.2 (1937)
    - No.3 (1939)
    - No.4 (1941)
    - No.5 (1942)
    - No.6 (1942)
  - 9 variaciones sobre el capricho núm. 24 de Paganini (1928)
  - 12 variaciones sobre el capricho núm. 24 de Paganini (1942)

== R ==
- Sergei Rachmaninoff
  - Prelude in C♯ minor, Op.3 No.2 (transcription for Violin Solo by W.H. Reed)
  - Prelude in G minor, Op.23 No.5 (transcription for Violin Solo by Ernst Richard Schliephake, 1993)
- Behzad Ranjbaran
  - Caprice No.1 (1995)
- Einojuhani Rautavaara
  - Variétude, Op.82 (1975)
- Max Reger
  - (4) Violin solo Sonatas, Op.42 (1900)
    - No.1 D minor (I.Allegro energico; II. Adagio con gran expressione; III. Scherzo. Prestissimo assai; IV. Fuge. Allegro energico)
    - No.2 A major (I. Allegro con grazia; II. Andantino; III. Prestissimo. Scherzando)
    - No.3 B minor (I. Pesante. Allegro; II. Canon. Andante semplice; III. Gigue. Prestissimo; IV. Vivacissimo à la Capriccio)
    - No.4 G minor (I. Sostenuto – Fuge. Allegro energico; II. Scherzo. Allegretto con grazia; III. Chaconne. Andante con moto)
  - Prelude and Fugue for Violin, A minor, Oh.Op. (1902)
  - (7) Sonatas for Violin Solo, Op.91 (1905)
    - No.1 A minor (I. Grave; II. Vivace; III. Andate sostenuto; IV. Allegro energico)
    - No.2 D major (I. Allegro moderato; II. Larghetto; III. Vivacissimo)
    - No.3 B♭ major (I. Allegro moderato; II. Scherzo. Prestissimo; III. Vivace)
    - No.4 B minor (I. Allegro energico; II. Larghetto; III. Vivace; IV. Allegro energico)
    - No.5 E minor (I. Allegro moderato; II. Con moto; III. Larghetto; IV. Allegro energico)
    - No.6 G major (I. Allegro commodo; II. Allegretto; III. Andante; IV. Vivacissimo)
    - No.7 A minor (I. Allegro energico; II. Scherzo. Vivace; III. Chaconne. Grave)
  - (8) Preludes, Fugues and Chaconne, for Solo Violin, Op. 117 (1909/12)
    - No.1 B minor
    - No.2 G minor
    - No.3 E minor
    - No.4 G minor (Chaconne)
    - No.5 G major (on themes by J.S. Bach)
    - No.6 D minor
    - No.7 A minor
    - No.8 E minor
  - (6) Preludes and Fugues for Solo Violin, Op.131a (1914)
    - No.1 A minor
    - No.2 D minor
    - No.3 G major
    - No.4 G minor
    - No.5 D major
    - No.6 E minor
  - Prelude for Violin solo in E minor, Oh.Op. (1915)
- Ruggiero Ricci
  - "Jeux interdits" Romance (arranged: from Anonimous)
  - "Recuerdos de la Alhambra" for violin solo (transcription from: Francisco Tarrega)
  - "La Cumparsita", Tango for solo violin (transcription from: Gerardo Matos Rodríguez / arranged by Vicente Zito / edited by Ricci)
- Max Richter
  - Berlin by Overnight (2008)
- George Rochberg
  - Caprice Variations, for violin solo (1970) (50 Variations on Paganini's 24th Caprice)
- Steven Rochen
  - A Piece of PI for Solo Violin (2008)
- Pierre Rode
  - 24 Caprices for solo violin (24 Caprices, plus some basic exercises), Op.22
- Joaquin Rodrigo
  - Capriccio, para violìn solo (1944)
- Johan Helmich Roman
  - Assaggi a violino solo
- Friedrich Wilhelm Rust
  - Sonata (No.1) for Violin Solo (I. Grave; II. Fuga; III. Gigue; IV. Chaconne; V. Gigue (reprise); VI. Courante)
  - Sonata No.2 for Violin Solo, in B♭ Major (I. Lento; II. Fuga; III. Aria – Double I, II, III, IV – Aria; IV. Bourrée; V. Couplet; VI. Gigue)
- Steve Rouse
  - Diamonds, for Violin solo (1989)
- Oleksii Rybak
  - Suite for Violin solo (2020)

== S ==
- Kaija Saariaho
  - ... de la Terre (1991), with electronics
  - Nocturne (1994)
  - Frises (2011), with electronics
  - Sense (2015)
  - Bon Vent (2018)
- Émile Sauret
  - 20 Grandes Études, Op.24 (1884)
  - 12 Artistic Etudes, Op.38 (1888)
  - 24 Études-Caprices, Op.64 (1902/03)
  - Suite for Violin solo, Op.68 (1907)
  - Cadenza to Paganini Violin Concerto No.1 in D major, Op.6 (1st mov.)
  - Cadenza to Mozart Violin Concerto No.4, K.218
  - Cadenza to Tartini "Devil's Trill" Sonata
- Marian Sawa
  - Lajkonik (2003)
  - Cadenza (2003?)
- Léon de Saint-Lubin
  - Adelaide de Beethoven transcrite en forme d'etude -to H.Vieuxtemps- (1848)
  - 6 grands Caprices ou Etudes, Op.8 for solo violin (new edition by Jenő Hubay)
  - 6 Exercises amusants en forme de Caprice, Op.41 for solo violin (1837)
  - 6 Grand Caprices, Op.42 for solo violin (new edition by Jenő Hubay, 1910)
  - (24) Etudes-Caprices dans les 24 tons de la gamme, for solo violin
  - Fantaisie sur un thême de Lucia di Lammermoor de Donizetti (on sextet "Chi mi frena in tal momento"), in D major Op.46 for solo violin (1844)
  - Thême Original et Etude de Sigismund Thalberg, Op.45a for solo violin
  - Variations sur un Thème de Haydn, Op.1 for solo violin (1818)
- Timothy Salter
  - "Oration" for solo violin
- Domenico Scarlatti
  - 12 Keyboard Sonatas (transcribed for solo violin by Tedi Papavrami, 2005/06):
    - in A minor, K. 54 (L. 241)
    - in D minor, K. 32 (L. 423)
    - in F minor, K. 466 (L. 118)
    - in F minor, K. 481 (L. 187)
    - in C minor, K. 11 (L. 352)
    - in E major, K. 380 (L. 23) "Cortège"
    - in B minor, K. 87 (L. 33)
    - in D minor, K. 141 (L. 422)
    - in G minor, K. 426 (L. 128)
    - in F minor, K. 185 (L. 173)
    - in D minor, K. 9 (L. 413), "Pastorale"
    - in B♭ major, K. 332 (L. 141)
- Franz Schubert
  - Eight Ländler in F♯ minor for solo violin, D 355 (1816)
  - Nine Ländler in D major for solo violin, D 370 (1816)
  - Eleven Ländler in B♭ major for solo violin, D 374 (1816?)
- Otakar Ševčík
  - 40 Variations faciles pour le violon, Op.3 (1893)
  - 6 Czech Dances and Airs, Op.10 -ded. Jan Kubelík- (1900)
  - Elaborate Studies on Wieniawski's 2nd Violin Concerto, Op.17 (1929)
  - Analytical Studies for Brahms' Violin Concerto, Op.18 (1930)
  - Elaborate Studies and Analysis bar to bar to P.I. Tschaikowsky, Op.35 Concerto in D Major with revised solo voice and complete piano score, Op.19
  - Elaborate Studies and Analysis bar by bar to N. Paganini Allegro-Concerto I, in D-Major with revised solo voice and complete piano score, Op.20
  - Analytical studies for Mendelssohn's Violin Concerto, Op.21 (1931)
- Hansheinz Schneeberger
  - Sonata (1942), for solo violin, dedicated to Walter Kägi
- Alfred Schnittke
  - Fuga, for solo violin, -Moderato- (1953)
  - "Prelude in memoriam Dmitri Shostakovich", for violin and tape (1975)
  - "A Paganini", for solo violin, -Andante- (1982)
- Erwin Schulhoff
  - Sonata for Solo Violin (1927) (I. Allegro con fuoco; II. Andante cantabile; III. Scherzo. Allegro grazioso; IV. Finale. Allegro risoluto)
- Laura Schwendinger
  - Sonata for solo violin (1995)
- Salvatore Sciarrino
  - 6 Capricci for solo violin (1975/76)
    - No.1 – Vivace
    - No.2 – Andante
    - No.3 – Assai agitato
    - No.4 – Volubile
    - No.5 – Presto
    - No.6 – Con brio
- Roger Sessions
  - Sonata for solo violin (1953)
  - Passacaglia (for Antoine Tamestit)
- Rodion Shchedrin
  - "Echo Sonata", for solo violin (1984) -written for the 300th Anniversary of J.S. Bach's birth. First performance on 27 June 1985 in Cologne by Ulf Hoelscher-
  - "Balalaika", for violin solo (1997) -for Maxim Vengerov. First performance on 29 March 1999 in Budapest by Maxim Vengerov-
  - "Variations and Theme", for violin solo (1998) -composed for the 4th International Violin Competition "Leopold Mozart" in Augsburg. First performance on 21 November 1999 in Augsburg-
  - "Duo", for violin solo (2000)
  - Gypsy Melody (2006)
- Alexander Shchetynsky
  - Sonata for solo violin (2009)
- Bright Sheng
  - The Stream flows (1991)
- Christian Sinding
  - Suite in D minor, for solo violin Op.123
- Camillo Sivori
  - 12 Études-Caprices, for solo violin Op.25
- Nikos Skalkottas
  - Sonata for solo violin, AK 69 (1925) (I. Allegro furioso, quasi presto; II. Adagietto; III. Allegro ritmato; IV. Adagio quasi recitativo – Allegro molto moderato – Adagio quasi recitativo)
- Richard Strauss
  - Daphne-Etude op.AV.141 (Etude G-Dur nach einem Motiv aus "Daphne")
- Igor Stravinsky
  - "Elegy", for solo violin/viola (Élégie), in G minor (1944) -to Germain Prevost, violist of Quatuour Pro Arte; in memory of the ensemble's leader Alphonse Onnou-

== T ==
- Eric Tanguy
  - "Sonata breve", for violin solo (1999)
- Francisco Tarrega
  - "Recuerdos de la Alhambra" for violin solo (transcription by Ruggiero Ricci)
- Giuseppe Tartini
  - 50 Variations on a Gavotte by Corelli (ed. Ruggiero Ricci)
  - 30 Sonate "piccole" per violino solo (from "Padua manuscript", 1750/55):
    - Sonata No.1, in G major (I. Molto andante; II. Allegro cantabile; III. Allegro; IV. Giga)
    - Sonata No.2, in D minor (I. Siciliana; II. Allegro; III. Allegro affettuoso)
    - Sonata No.3, in D Major (I. Andante cantabile; II. Allegro; III. Giga; IV. Allegro assai)
    - Sonata No.4, in C major (I. Andante cantabile; II. Allegro assai; III. Grave; IV. Presto)
    - Sonata No.5, in F major (I. Andante cantabile; II. Allegro; III. Allegro assai; IV. "Il tormento di questo cuore")
    - Sonata No.6, in E minor (I. Andante cantabile "senti lo mare"; II. Allegro cantabile; III. Giga)
    - Sonata No.7, in A minor (I. Adagio; II. Allegro; III. Tema con variazione; IV. [Allegro assai])
    - Sonata No.8, in G minor (I. Andante; II. Allegro; III. Affettuoso; IV. Allegro assai)
    - Sonata No.9, in A major (I. Largo andante; II. Allegro; III. Allegro; IV. Allegro assai; V. Menuet)
    - Sonata No.10, in B♭ major (I. Largo; II. Allegro; III. Subito affettuoso; IV. Menuet)
    - Sonata No.11, in E major (I. Andante cantabile; II. Allegro; III. [Siciliana]; IV. Menuet; V. Allegro assai)
    - Sonata No.12, in G major (I. Tasso; II. Grave "Il tormento di quest'anima"; III. Canzone Veneziana; IV. "Quanto mai felici siete"; V. Tema con Variazioni)
    - Sonata No.13, in B minor, B.h1 (I. Andante; II. Allegro assai; III. Giga: Allegro affettuoso)
    - Sonata No.14, in G major, B.G4 (I. Andante cantabile; II. Allegro assai; III. Allegro; IV. Aria del Tasso)
    - Sonata No.--, in G major, B.G3 (VI. Allegro; VII. Allegro arpeggio)
    - Sonata No.15, in C major, B.C2 (I. Andante cantabile; II. Allegro; III. Giga; IV. Menuet; V. Allegro)
    - Sonata No.16, in D major, B.D2 (I. Andante cantabile; II. Allegro assai; III. Aria del Tasso; IV. Furlana)
    - Sonata No.17, in C major, B.C3 (I. Andante cantabile amatissimo; II. Allegro battute sciolte; III. Allegro assai; IV. Gravi -per CSolfaut-; V. Giga)
    - Sonata No.18, in D major, B.D3 (I. Andante cantabile; II. Allegro assai; III. Siciliana. Andante; IV. Menuet 1 & 2; V. Aria: Allegro assai)
    - Sonata No.19
    - Sonata No.20
    - Sonata No.21
    - Sonata No.22
    - Sonata No.23
    - Sonata No.24
    - Sonata No.25
    - Sonata No.26 (27th in sequence)
    - Sonata No.27 (later hand sketches in "Padua Manuscript")
    - Sonata No.28 (later hand sketches in "Padua Manuscript")
    - Sonata No.29 (later hand sketches in "Padua Manuscript")
    - Sonata No.30 (later hand sketches in "Padua Manuscript")
- Georg Philipp Telemann
  - Twelve Fantasias, TWV 40:14–25 (1735)
    - No.1 in B♭ major (I. Largo; II. Allegro; III. Grave; IV. Si replica l'Allegro)
    - No.2 in G major (I. Largo; II. Allegro; III. Allegro)
    - No.3 in F minor (I. Adagio; II. Presto; III. Grave; IV. Vivace)
    - No.4 in D major (I. Vivace; II. Grave; III. Allegro)
    - No.5 in A major (I. Allegro: II. Presto; III. Allegro; IV. Andante; V. Allegro)
    - No.7 in E♭ major (I. Dolce; II. Allegro; III. Largo; IV. Presto)
    - No.8 in E major (I. Piacevolumente; II. Spirituoso; III. Allegro)
    - No.9 in B minor (I. Siciliana; II. Vivace; III. Allegro)
    - No.10 in D major (I. Presto; II. Largo; III. Allegro)
    - No.11 in F major (I. Un poco vivace; II. Soave; III. Da capo un poco vivace; IV. Allegro)
    - No.12 in A minor (I. Moderato; II. Vivace; III. Presto)
- Jesús Torres
  - "Chacona" (2004), for solo violin
- Joan Tower
  - "Platinum Spirals" (1976), for violin
  - "String Force" (2010), for solo violin
  - "Second String Force" (2015), for solo violin
- Eduard Tubin
  - Sonata for solo violin, ETW 57 (1962)
  - Suite on Estonian Dance Pieces, for violin solo, ETW 58
- Erik Tulindberg
  - Polonoise and five variations, for solo violin

== V ==
- Flausino Vale
  - 26 Prelúdios Característicos e Concertantes para Violino Só:
    - No.1 "Batuque", Allegro – Presto, in G major (Jacinto de Méis, 1922)
    - No.2 "Suspiro d'alma", Andante. Tempo rubato, in C major (Francisco Chiafitelli, 1923)
    - No.3 "Devaneio", Allegretto, in A major (Raul Laranjeira, 1924)
    - No.4 "Brado íntimo", ---, in A major (José Martins de Mattos, 1924)
    - No.5 "Tico-Tico", Allegretto, in G minor (Marcos Salles, 1926)
    - No.6 "Repente", Allegro, in A major (Torquato Amore, 1924)
    - No.7 "Marcha funebre", ---, in G minor (Ernesto Ronchini, 1927)
    - No.8 "Sonhando", Allegro – Moderato, in G major (Leonidas Autuori, 1929)
    - No.9 "Rondó doméstico", Allegro, in G major (Edgardo Guerra, 1933)
    - No.10 "Interrogando o destino", Moderato, in C minor (Zino Francescatti, 1933)
    - No.11 "Casamento na roça", Allegro, in G major (Oscar Borgerth, 1933)
    - No.12 "Canto da inhuma (I)", Allegro (sem bravura. Mimoso), in G major (Nicolino Milano, 1933)
    - No.13 "Asas inquietas", Allegretto, in E minor (Ernest N. Doring, 1933)
    - No.14 "A Porteira da fazenda", Allegro, in A major (Heitor Villa-Lobos, 1933)
    - No.15 "Ao pé da fogueira", Allegro comodo, in D major (Agnelo França, c.1935) – transcribed by Jascha Heifetz for violin and piano
    - No.16 "Requiescat in pace", Andantino in G major (Sra. Mãe Augusta de Campos Vale, c.1935/39)
    - No.17 "Viola destemida", Allegro, in G major (Ruggiero Ricci, 1939)
    - No.18 "Pai João", Allegretto, in G major (Jascha Heifetz, 1939)
    - No.19 "Folguedo campestre", Allegro, in E♭ major (Francisco Mignone, 1933)
    - No.20 "Tirana riograndese", Allegretto, in G minor (Renato Almeida, 1930s)
    - No.21 "Preludio da vitória", Allegretto, in D minor (Paulina D'Ambrosio, 1930s)
    - No.22 "Mocidade eterna", Allegro, in A minor (Orlando Frederico, 1940s)
    - No.23 "Implorando", Barcarolla, in A major (Cláudio Santoro, 1924)
    - No.24 "Viva São João", Allegro, in E♭ major (Isaac Stern, 1940s)
    - No.25 "A mocinha e o papudo" (Henryk Szeryng, 1940s)
    - No.26 "Acalanto", Andantino, in G major (Esteban Eitler, 1940s)
  - Variações sobre a canção "Paganini", for violin solo (from Operetta "Paganini" by Franz Lehár – dedicated to Jascha Heifetz)
- Franz von Vecsey
  - Preludio e Fuga in C minor (1914 – dedicated to Jenő Hubay)
- Giuseppe Verdi
  - "Celeste Aida" (transcription for Violin Solo by Ernst Schliephake, 1993)
- Henri Vieuxtemps
  - "6 Études de concert", Op.16 (pub. 1845; ed. Jenő Hubay)
    - No.1 in G minor (Allegro moderato)
    - No.2 in G major (Moderato)
    - No.3 in D major (Allegretto)
    - No.4 in E♭ major (Allegro ma non troppo)
    - No.5 in C major (Adagio, non troppo)
    - No.6 in E major (Adagio – Allegretto – Più lento – Tempo I°)
  - "3 Cadenzas" to Beethoven's Violin Concerto, Op.61 (1854)
  - "36 Études", for violin and piano or for violin solo, Op.48 -Op.2 posthumous; dedicated to the Conservatoire de Paris- (1881)
  - "6 Morceaux" pour violon seul suivis d'un Capriccio pour alto seul, Op.55 -Op.9 posthumous- (pub.1883)
    - No.1 Andante
    - No.2 Moderato
    - No.3 Prélude (dedicated to violinist Léon Reynier)
    - No.4 Tempo di minuetto
    - No.5 Andante
    - No.6 Introduction et fugue: Adagio cantabile
    - No.7 Capriccio "Hommage à Paganini", for viola solo
  - "Divertissement" pour violon seul, Op.61 -Op.15 posthumous; dedicated to violinist Lambert Massart- (pub.1883)
- Johann Joseph Vilsmayr
  - Six Partitas (Artificiosus Concentus pro Camera)
- Giovanni Battista Viotti
  - "Duetto a un violino solo... per il suo amico Cherubini", WV:23 (15.III.1821 / rev. Pietro Spada, 1984)

== W ==
- Rodney Waschka II
  - "Xuan Men", for violin solo (1991)
  - "Day Ut Ia Pobrusa", for violin solo (2009)
- Melia Watras (b.1969)
  - "Luminous Points", for violin solo (2013)
- Mieczysław Weinberg (Moisei Vainberg)
  - Sonata No.1 for violin solo, Op.82 (1964) (I. Adagio – Allegro – Adagio; II. Andante; III. Allegretto; IV. Lento; V. Presto)
  - Sonata No.2 for violin solo, Op.95 (1967) (I. Monody: Allegro moderato -; II. Pauses: Andantino grazioso -; III. Intervals: Presto agitato -; IV. Remarks: Andantino non tanto -; V. Accompaniment: Allegretto leggiero -; VI. Invocation: Lento affettuoso -; VII. Syncopations: Vivace marcato)
  - Sonata No.3 for violin solo, Op.126 (1979) (one movement work, in seven sections)
  - from 24 Preludes for cello solo Op.100 (1969): Nos. 1 & 2 (arr. by Gidon Kremer for violin solo)
- Stanley Weiner (1925–1991)
  - Caprices (13) for solo violin "Homage to Violinists" (1957/60) [ed. Schott, 1962]:
    - No.1 to Yehudi Menuhin (Un poco lento e rubato)
    - No.2 to Joseph Szigeti (Un poco lento)
    - No.3 to Nathan Milstein (Scherzando)
    - No.4 to Arthur Grumiaux
    - No.5 to Henryk Szeryng (Allegro con fuoco)
    - No.6 to Louis Persinger (Un poco lento)
    - No.7 to Isaac Stern (Molto vivace)
    - No.8 to Ivan Galamian
    - No.9 to Zino Francescatti
- Johann Paul von Westhoff
  - 6 Partitas for solo violin
  - Suite in A major, for solo violin (1683)
- Henryk Wieniawski
  - "L’École Moderne", (9) Études-Caprices for Violin Solo, Op.10 (1854)
    - No.1 Le Sautillé (Presto)
    - No.2 La Vélocité (Allegro vivace)
    - No.3 L'Étude (Moderato)
    - No.4 Le Staccato (Allegro gioioso)
    - No.5 Alla Saltarella (Scherzando)
    - No.6 Prélude (Allegro moderato)
    - No.7 La Cadenza (Largo)
    - No.8 Le Chant du bivouac (Allegro marziale)
    - No.9 Les Arpéges – Variations sur l'Hymne autrichien (Thème. Andante — Var.I — Var.II effect: 'sons harmoniques' — Var.III effect: 'pizzicato main gauche' Poco più lento)
    - addendum: No.10 Exercices en trilles
  - (8) Etudes-Caprices, Op.18 -with 2nd violin- (1862; ed. Jenő Hubay)
    - Book I (1–4):
      - No.1 Moderato – Allegro moderato – con fuoco – Tempo I°
      - No.2 Andante – Agitato e vigoroso – Tempo I° – Adagio
      - No.3 Allegro moderato
      - No.4 Tempo di Saltarella, ma non troppo vivo
    - Book II (5–8):
      - No.5 Praeludium. Allegretto scherzando
      - No.6 Andante ma non troppo – Presto – Allegro non troppo
      - No.7 Andante non troppo
      - No.8 Allegro risoluto
- Randal Woolf
  - I’ve Got No Axe To Grind**
- Charles Wuorinen
  - "The Long and the Short" (1969)
  - "Violin Variations" (1972)

== X ==
- Yannis Xenakis
  - "Mykka(s)" -dedicated to Ivry Gitlis- (1972)

== Y ==
- Eugène Ysaÿe
  - 6 Sonatas for Solo Violin, Op.27 (1923):
    - No.1 in G minor "to Joseph Szigeti" (I. Grave; II. Fugato; III. Allegretto poco scherzoso; IV. Finale. Con brio)
    - No.2 in A minor "to Jacques Thibaud" (I. Obsession. Prelude; II. Malinconia; III. Danse des Ombres. Sarabande; IV. Les furies)
    - No.3 in D minor "to Georges Enescu" (Ballades. Lento molto sostenuto – Allegro in tempo giusto e con bravura)
    - No.4 in E minor "to Fritz Kreisler" (I. Allemanda; II. Sarabande; III. Finale)
    - No.5 in G major "to Mathieu Crickboom" (I. L'Aurore; II. Danse rustique)
    - No.6 in E major "to Manuel Quiroga" (Habañera. Allegro giusto non troppo vivo)
  - Essai sur le mécanisme moderne du violon (13 Preludes), Op.35
  - Etude Posthume
- Isang Yun
  - "Koenigliches Thema" for violin solo (1976)
  - "Li-Na im Garten", 5 Pieces for violin solo (1984/85)
  - "Kontraste", 2 Pieces for violin solo (1987)

== Z ==
- Bernd Alois Zimmermann
  - Sonata for Violin (1951) (I. Präludium. Andante sostenuto; II. Allegro moderato, risoluto; III. Toccata. Allegro moderato)
- Maciej Żołnowski
  - Sonata I (2014)
  - Sonata II (2014)
  - Sonata III (2014)
- John Zorn
  - Goetia
  - Passagen

== See also ==
- Violin sonata
- String instrument repertoire
