= List of compositions by Theodor Kirchner =

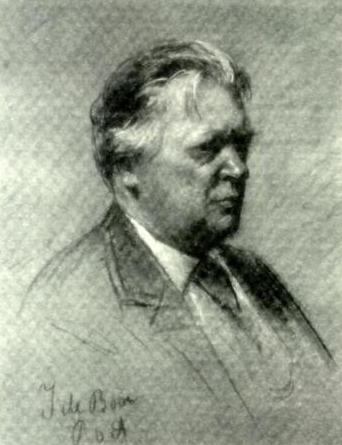
Pastel portrait of Kirchner by Julie de Boor, 1898

This article presents a list of compositions by Theodor Kirchner (1823–1903).

== Piano ==
=== Piano solo ===
- Zehn Klavierstücke, Op. 2
- Grüße an meine Freunde, Op. 5
- Albumleaves, Op. 7
- Scherzo, Op. 8
- 16 Preludes, Op. 9
- Skizzen, Op. 11
- Adagio quasi Fant, Op. 12
- Lieder ohne Worte, Op. 13
- Neun Fantasiestücke, Op. 14
- Kleine Lust- und Trauerspiele, Op. 16
- Neue Davidsbündlertänze, Op. 17
- Legenden, Op. 18
- Zehn Klavierstücke nach eigenen Liedern, Op. 19
- Aquarellen, Op. 21
- Acht Romanzen, Op. 22
- 12 Waltzes, Op. 23
- Still und bewegt, Op. 24
- Nachtbilder, Op. 25
- Album, Op. 26
- Six Caprices, Op. 27
- Notturnos, Op. 28
- Aus meinem Skizzenbuch, Op. 29
- Studien und Stücke, Op. 30
- Im Zwielicht, Op. 31
- Aus trüben Tagen, Op. 32
- Ideale, Op. 33
- Seven Waltzes, Op. 34
- Game Material (14 easy Piano Pieces), Op. 35
- Fantasien am Klavier, Op. 36
- Vier Elegien, Op. 37
- 12 Etudes, Op. 38
- Dorfgeschichten, Op. 39
- Verwehte Blätter, Op. 41
- Mazurkas, Op. 42
- Four Polonaises, Op. 43/1
- Polonaise, Op. 43/2
- Blumen zum Strauß, Op. 44
- Sechs Stücke für Klavier, Op. 45
- 30 Kinder- und Künstlertänze, Op. 46
- Federzeichnungen, Op. 47
- Sechs Humoresken, Op. 48
- New Album Leaves: 2 Character Pieces, Op. 49
- An Stephen Heller, Op. 51
- Ein neues Klavierbuch, Op. 52
- Florestan und Eusebius, Op. 53
- Zweites Scherzo, Op. 54
- New Scenes of Childhood, Op. 55
- Fruhlingsgruß, Op. 56
- Plaudereien am Klavier, Op. 60
- Charakterstücke, Op. 61
- Miniaturen, Op. 62
- Gavotten, Menuetten und lyrische Stücke, Op. 64
- 60 Preludes, Op. 65
- Lieblinge der Jugend, Op. 66
- Five Sonatines, Op. 70
- 100 kleine Studien für Klavier, Op. 71
- Quiet Songs and Dances, Op. 72
- Romantische Geschichten, Op. 73
- Alte Erinnerungen, Op. 74
- Neun Stücke für Klavier, Op. 75
- Reflexes, Op. 76
- Polonaise, Op. 77/1
- Waltz, Op. 77/2
- Länder, Op. 77/3
- Les Mois de l'Année, Op. 78
- Eight Pieces for Piano Solo, Op. 79
- Albumblätter (Neue Folge), Op. 80
- Gedenkblätter, Op. 82
- Bunte Blätter, Op. 83
- Eight Nocturnes, Op. 87
- Aus der Jugendzeit, Op. 88
- Zwölf Fantasiestücke, Op. 90
- Confidences, Op. 96
- Wolkenbilder, Op. 100
- Memoryleave, Op. 101
- Waltz, Op. 104
- 36 rhythmische und melodische Etüden, Op. 105
- Vorbereitungsstudien, Op. 106
- Deutsche Walzer
- Bilder aus Osten von Robert Schumann, Transcription for Solo Piano
- Spanische Tänze von Sarasate for Piano
- 2 Danses italiennes
- Danses hongroises de J. Brahms
- Diana und Mars
- Liebeslieder Walzer von Johannes Brahms, Transcriptions for Solo Piano
- Lieblinge der Jugend
- 10 Lieder von Frédéric Chopin, Transcriptions for Solo Piano
- Morceau melancolique
- 5 Petits Preludes
- Stücke für Enkel
- Tempo de Valse
- Walzer von Tchaikovsky from the Serenade for String Orchestra, Transcription for Solo Piano

=== Piano, four hands ===
- Zwölf Originalkompositionen for Piano, Four hands, Op. 57
- Zwei Märsche for Piano, Four hands, Op. 94
- Alte Bekannte im neuen Gewande for Piano, Four hands

=== Two pianos ===
- Variationen über ein eigenes Thema for Two Pianos, Op. 85
- Seven Waltzes for Two Pianos, Op. 86

== Organ ==
- 13 Orgelkompositionen for Organ

== Chamber music ==
=== Violin and piano ===
- Schlummerlied und Romanze for Violin and Piano, Op. 63
- 12 Fantasiestücke for Violin and Piano, Op. 90
- Albumblatt for Violin and Piano

=== Cello and piano ===
- Eight Pieces for Cello and Piano, Op. 79

=== Piano trio ===
- Ein Gedenkblatt for Piano Trio, Op. 15
- 15 Kindertrios for Piano Trio, Op. 58
- 12 Novelleten for Piano Trio, Op. 59
- Zwiegsang for Piano Trio, Op. 83/1
- Humoreske for Piano Trio, Op. 83/2
- Romanze for Piano Trio, Op. 83/3
- Scherzino for Piano Trio, Op. 83/4
- Novellette for Piano Trio, Op. 83/5
- Lied ohne Worte for Piano Trio, Op. 83/6
- Barcarola for Piano Trio, Op. 83/7
- Serenata for Piano Trio, Op. 83/8
- Erzählung for Piano Trio, Op. 83/9
- Mädchenlied for Piano Trio, Op. 83/10
- Capriccio for Piano Trio, Op. 83/11
- Abenmusik for Piano Trio, Op. 83/12
- Two Terzette for Piano Trio, Op. 97
- Two Terzette for Piano Trio, Op. 99
- Serenade in E Major for Piano Trio
- Kleines Trio for Piano Trio
- Six Pieces in Canonic Form for Piano Trio (after Robert Schumann's Op. 56)
- Humoresque for Piano Trio

=== Piano quartet ===
- Piano Quartet in C Minor, Op. 84

=== String quartet ===
- String Quartet in G Major, Op. 20
- Nur Tropfen for String Quartet

=== Other ===
- Two Pieces for Violin and Organ, Op. 91
- Two Pieces for Cello and Organ, Op. 92

== Choral music ==
- Vier Gedichte von Goethe, Op. 69
- Volkslieder, Op. 93
- Die heilige Nacht
- Schweizers Heimweh

== Lieder ==
- Zehn Lieder, Op. 1
- Mädchenlieder, Op. 3
- Vier Lieder, Op. 4
- Funf Lieder, Op. 6
- Zwei Könige, Op. 10
- Drei Gedichte, Op. 40
- Sechs Lieder, Op. 50
- Liebeserwachen, Op. 67
- Nähe des Geliebten, Op. 68
- Sechs Lieder, Op. 81
- Ich wandere durch die stille Nacht, Op. 95
- Heinrich in Canossa, Op. 102
- Ein schöner Stern geht auf, Op. 103
- Bitten
- Bitte weil auf mir
- Du wundersüsses Kind
- Ich hab im Traum geweint
- Singe, weine, bete
- Wiegenlied Eia Popeia
