= Souvenir de Florence =

String Sextet by Tchaikovsky

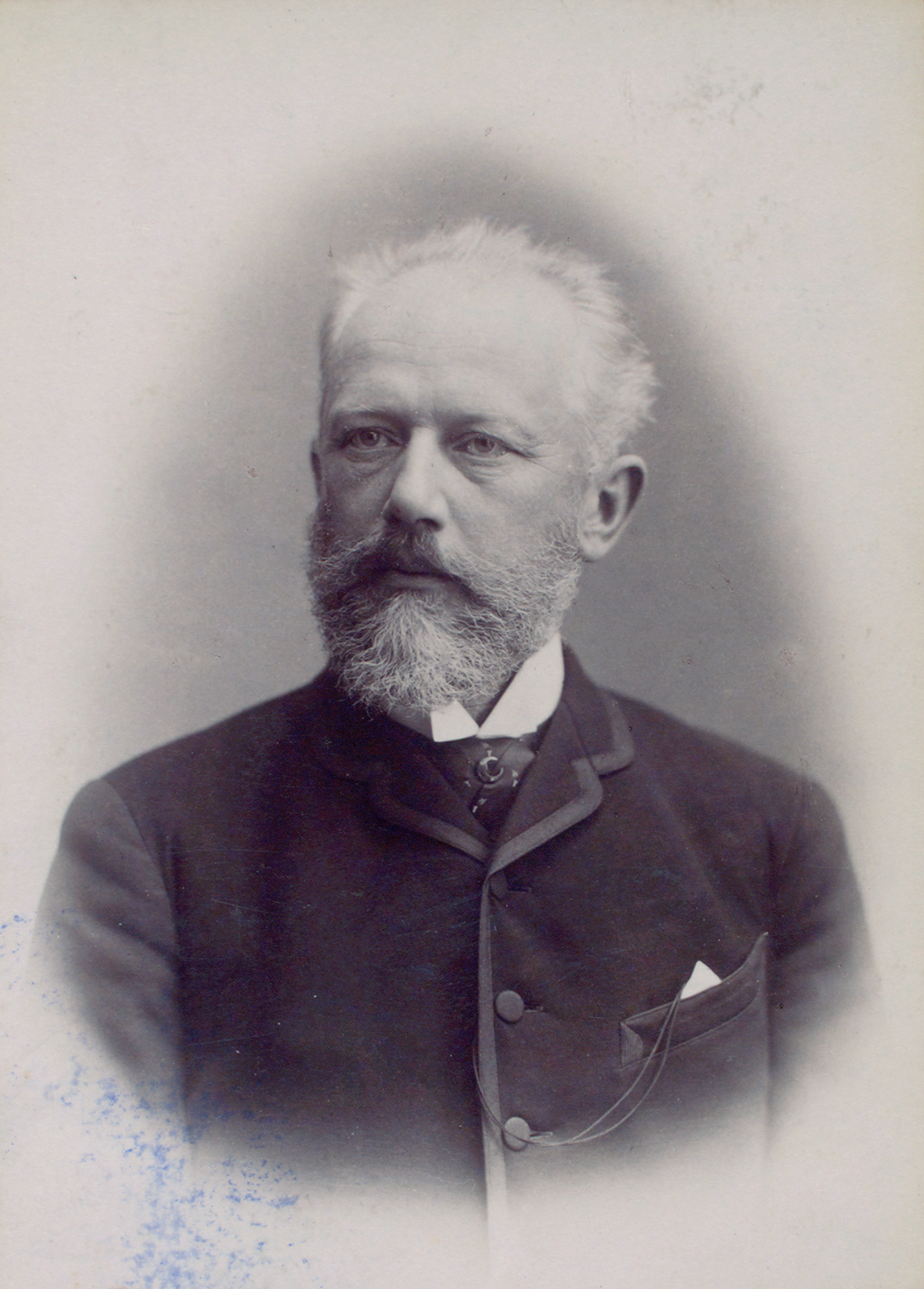
Pyotr Ilyich Tchaikovsky, c. 1888

The String Sextet in D minor "Souvenir de Florence", Op. 70, is a string sextet scored for two violins, two violas, and two cellos composed in the summer of 1890 by Pyotr Ilyich Tchaikovsky. The work, in the traditional four-movement form, was titled "Souvenir de Florence" because the composer sketched one of the work's principal themes while visiting Florence, Italy, where he composed The Queen of Spades. Tchaikovsky dedicated the work to the St. Petersburg Chamber Music Society in response to his becoming an Honorary Member.

The work was premiered on 10 December 1890 in Saint Petersburg. The work was revised between December 1891 and January 1892, before being premiered in 1892. It is the only string sextet by the composer.

== Music ==
III. Allegretto moderato
The third movement, performed by the United States Army Band

The sextet has four movements:

1. Allegro con spirito (D minor, approx. 11:00)
2. Adagio cantabile e con moto (D major, approx. 10:00)
3. Allegretto moderato (A minor, approx. 6:00)
4. Allegro con brio e vivace (D minor – D major, approx. 7:00)

The first movement is in sonata form and, without introduction, presents a rather violent yet melodic first theme in D minor. The second theme, in the dominant major key of A major, is much calmer; it flows from the first theme almost effortlessly and then proceeds into the development and recapitulation, which concludes with a quick coda.

The slow movement, in D major, has a very innocent, romantic theme initially stated by the first violin with pizzicato accompaniment before being taken up by the cello. Following interruption by an interlude for all of the instruments, the theme returns for a repeat of the first section.

The last two movements, with their distinctly Russian and folk-like melodies and rhythms, greatly contrast with the preceding two.

== Performance history ==
Short list of notable performances of Souvenir de Florence.

- Saint Petersburg, Russian Empire: 6 December 1892
- Moscow, Russian Empire: 15 December 1892
- New York, United States: 13 January 1893, conducted by Anton Seidl at Carnegie Hall.

== Arrangements ==
This work has also been arranged for string orchestra, including one example by Yuli Turovsky.

Excerpts from the score were used in the 2005 ballet Anna Karenina, choreographed by Boris Eifman.
