= Octet (Bruch) =

String octet by Max Bruch (1920)

String Octet
- by Max Bruch
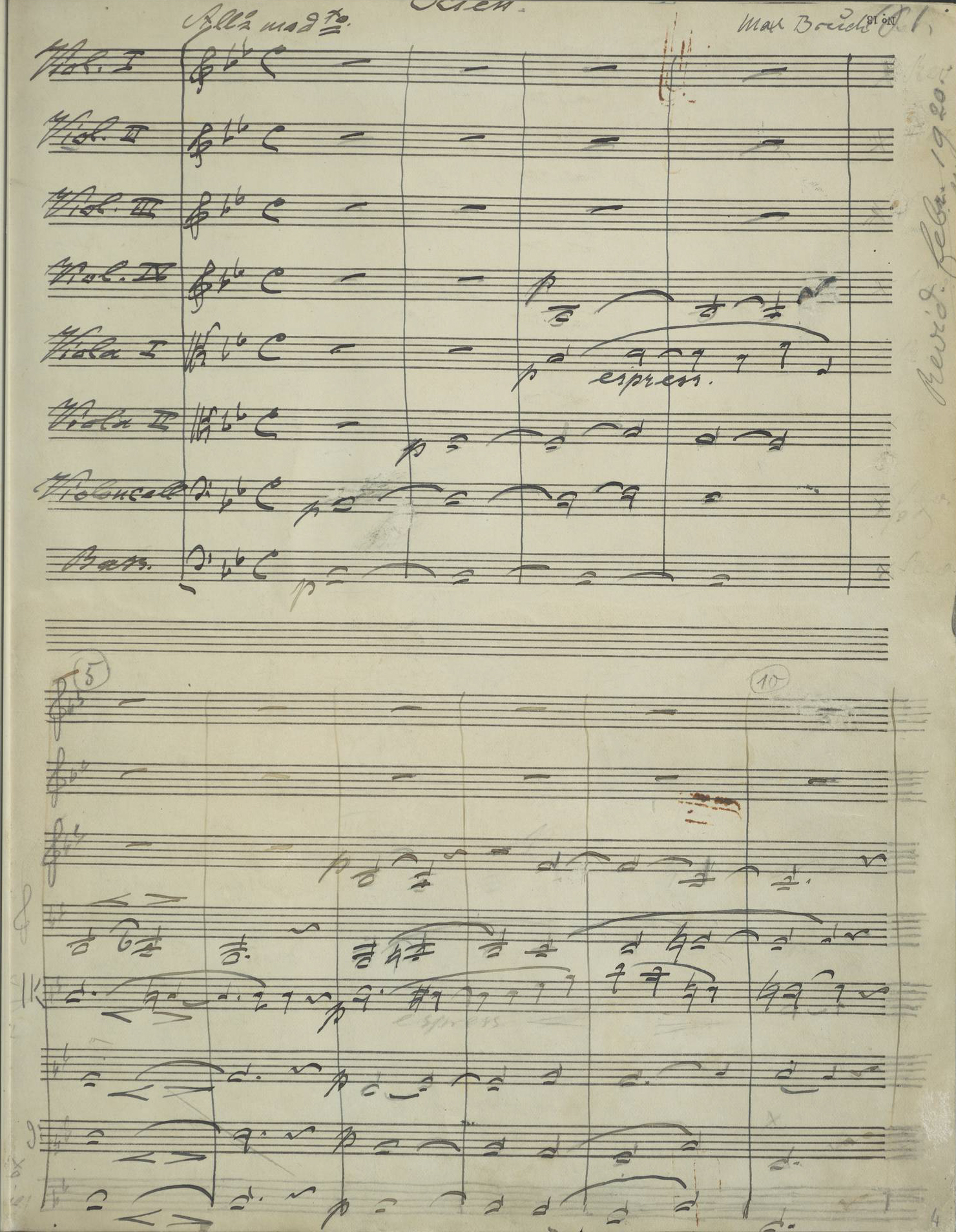
- First page of manuscript
- Key: B♭ major
- Composed: 1920
- Dedication: Willy Hess
- Published: 1996
- Duration: 22 minutes
- Movements: three
- Scoring: four violins; two violas; cello; double bass

Premiere
- Date: 16 July 1937
- Location: Daventry (BBC broadcast)

The String Octet in B♭ major, Op. posth., was composed by Max Bruch for four violins, two violas, cello and double bass. Completed in 1920, the year of his death, it is his last work and would not be published until 1996. The work is also known under the name Concerto for String Orchestra (Octet).

== Background ==
The octet was written following a period of depression caused by the death of his wife Clara and the general dire state of defeated Germany. Unsatisfied with an earlier string quintet in B♭ major that was written in the first three months of 1919, Bruch reworked the string quintet into an octet in 1920. Shortly after its completion, his health deteriorated further, and he died on 2 October.

Bruch dedicated the octet to his friend Willy Hess, a professor at the Royal Manchester College of Music. Hess, who had the autograph scores in his possession, played through the work with his students, and in 1936 ceded the performing rights to Bruch's eldest son Max Felix and his daughter-in-law Gertrude. Handwritten copies of the parts made by Gertrude have been discovered in the BBC Music Library, though it is unclear how they got there. The parts were incorrectly allocated the opus number 97.

The work was premiered in a live BBC broadcast from Daventry on the National network on 16 July 1937. Despite it being the first performance of a work by a famous composer, no mention was given in The Listener or the press. Only a short paragraph appeared in the Radio Times: "Max Bruch, whose Violin Concerto in G minor is known to all violinists, and whose Kol Nidrei is equally familiar to cellists, was made an Honorary Doctor of Music in the University of Cambridge, and all his life he was very proud of this distinction. He had a great admiration for Scottish and Welsh folk music, of which he published several arrangements for male and mixed choruses. Bruch died in 1920. His String Octet, which is receiving its first performance this afternoon, is still in manuscript. It was dedicated to Professor Willy Hess, of the Manchester Royal College of Music, who owned the performing rights until he ceded them about a year ago to Max Bruch's son and daughter-in-law."

For decades after the broadcast, nothing was heard of the work until Bruch's biographer Christopher Fifield began looking for it. The manuscript, which had been placed in the care of the Berlin-based publisher Rudolf Eichmann, turned up in the Austrian National Library in Vienna, where it is still held today. The work was first published by Simrock in 1996.

== Structure ==
External audio
- Performed by the Ulf Hoelscher Ensemble
- I. Allegro moderato
- II. Adagio
- III. Allegro molto

The work is classical in structure, though it omits the conventional scherzo. It bears some similarity to Mendelssohn's String Octet, particularly in the structure of the first movement and the character of the third movement, which has much of Mendelssohn's "infectious exuberance". The two works differ in instrumentation however: Bruch replaced a second cello with a double bass.

It consists of three movements:

1. Allegro moderato
2. Adagio
3. Allegro molto

=== I. Allegro moderato ===
The first movement is held in sonata form and begins with a slow introduction, in which the viola takes the lead:

It is followed by an Allegro moderato section that makes use of a dramatic first theme and a lyrical second theme, ending with a coda.

=== II. Adagio ===
The Adagio opens with a cantabile theme in the dark key of E♭ minor in the first violin over rhythmic accompaniment in the other strings:

The second section, marked Andante con molto di moto, features a brighter second theme in major that has been called the "highlight of the work":

A march-like passage is followed by a reprise of the second theme, before ending quietly.

=== III. Allegro molto ===
The final movement exhibits characteristics of a scherzo, in a playful and triumphant spirit. In defiance to the circumstances of composition, it seems to express the hope that Bruch himself harbored even during his final illness: to regain enough strength to revisit some of the places of his youth. It opens with tremolos throughout the strings:

In a second section, the cello introduces a more noble melody:

The first theme is reprised in a grand fashion, driving the octet to a sweeping coda.

== Reception ==
Lucy Miller Murray remarks that "one cannot help but wonder why this splendid work has been so overlooked except to note that it appeared in the heyday of the Second Viennese School and at the edges of Serialism." Violinist Julia Fischer has championed the piece, calling it "one of the most beautiful works ever" and "insanely romantic and incredibly fun".

== Recordings ==
Year	Artists	Label	I	II	III	Ref
1998	Ulf Hoelscher Ensemble	CPO	Length: 11:20	Length: 7:12	Length: 6:20	
2004	Kodaly Quartet, Auer Quartet, Zsolt Fejérvári	Naxos	Length: 10:35	Length: 7:41	Length: 6:23	
2013	Liviu Prunaru, Tharice Virtuosi	Claves	Length: 11:14	Length: 7:39	Length: 6:43	
2017	Nash Ensemble	Hyperion	Length: 10:04	Length: 6:20	Length: 5:44	
