= String Sextet No. 1 (Brahms) =

1860 composition by Johannes Brahms

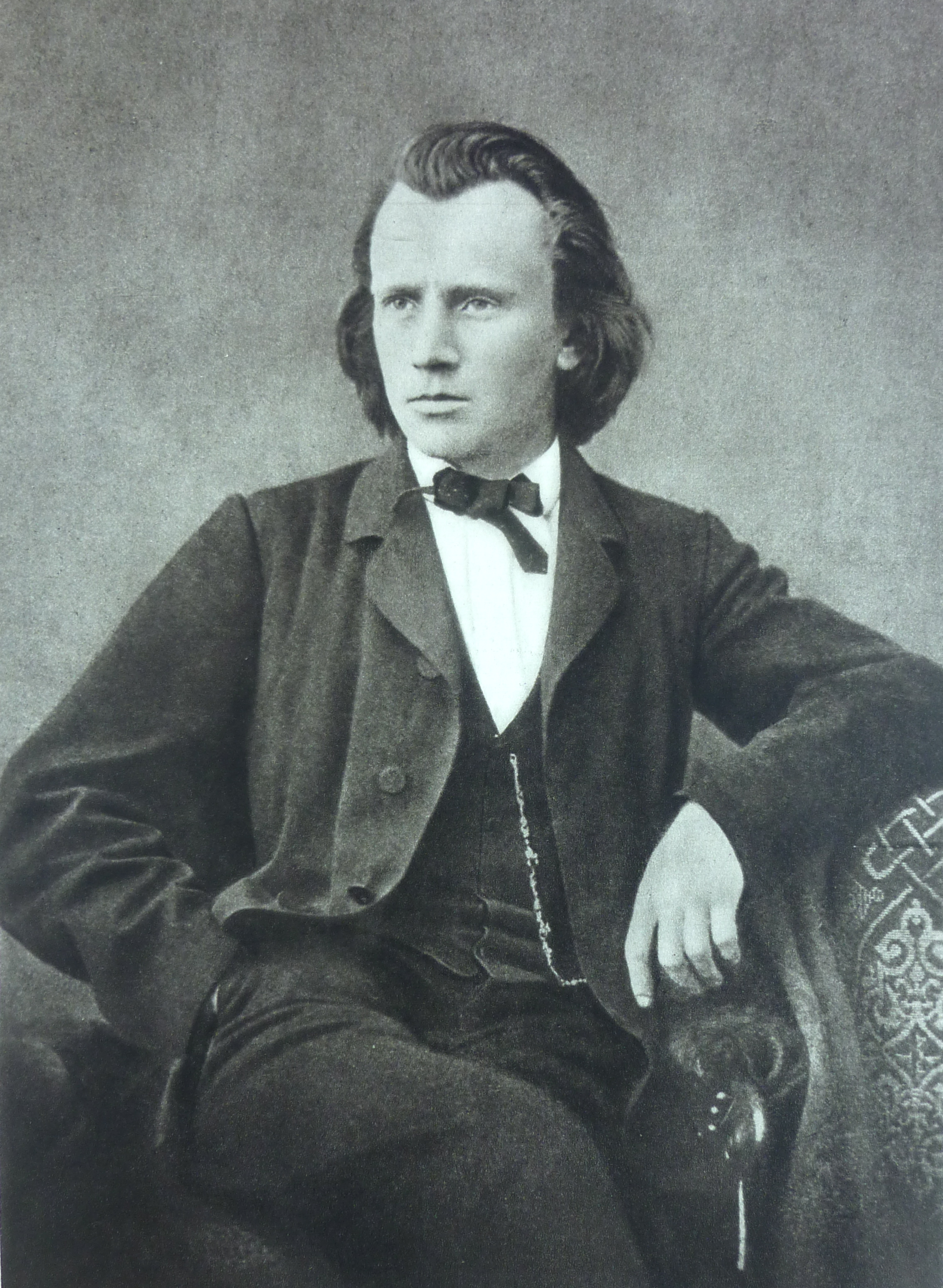
Johannes Brahms c. 1866

The String Sextet No. 1 in B♭ major, Op. 18, was composed in 1860 by Johannes Brahms and premiered 20 October that year in Hanover by an ensemble led by Joseph Joachim. It was published in 1862 by the firm of Fritz Simrock.

== Music ==
The sextet is scored for two violins, two violas, and two cellos.

The sextet has four movements:

1. Allegro ma non troppo, in 3/4 time
2. Andante, ma moderato, in D minor and 2/4 time (and in variation form)
3. Scherzo: Allegro molto in F major and 3/4, with a central Animato trio section
4. Rondo: Poco allegretto e grazioso, in 2/4

The outlines of the main themes of the first movement and finale are similar (the first four notes of the cello theme of the first movement are almost identical with those of notes two to five of the finale, and there are other similarities more easily heard).

In the same year of its composition, Brahms transcribed the second movement for solo piano, dedicating the arrangement to Clara Schumann.

== Sextet chronology ==
There are earlier string sextets by Luigi Boccherini (two sets of six each). However, between Boccherini and Brahms, very few for string instruments without piano seem to have been written or published, whereas within the decades following Brahms's two examples, a number of composers, including Antonín Dvořák, Peter Ilyich Tchaikovsky, Joachim Raff, Max Reger, Arnold Schoenberg, and Erich Wolfgang Korngold, all wrote string sextets.

Those few examples of such sextets that appeared between the Boccherini and the Brahms include a sextuor à deux violons, deux violes, violoncelle & basse from the 1780s (still later than the 1776 or so of Boccherini's Op. 23) by Ignaz Pleyel, Ignacy Feliks Dobrzyński's Op. 39 in E♭ (with double-bass, and published in 1848), Louis Spohr's sextet in C major (Op. 140) of 1848, and the sextet in D minor (with double bass) by Aloys Schmitt of 1852 (one other possible exception is the sextet of Ferdinand David – published in 1861 and possibly performed in 1860.)

== Popular culture ==
This sextet was used as soundtrack by French director Louis Malle in the 1958 movie The Lovers. The sextet's second movement is featured in the Star Trek: The Next Generation episode "Sarek". The second movement is also featured in "The Day of the Devil", an episode of Inspector Morse, and in the 2001 French-Austrian film The Piano Teacher.
