= Flausino Vale =

Flausino Rodrigues Valle, better known as Flausino Vale (Barbacena, Minas Gerais, 6 January 1894 – Belo Horizonte, 4 April 1954) was a Brazilian violinist/composer. Although he was a lawyer, he was a major researcher on Brazilian folk music. He was professor of History of Music at the Conservatório Mineiro de Música. Like Paganini, he had composed an album of 26 Preludes for solo violin in a Brazilian landscape style.

== Biography ==
Flausino Vale was son of Francisco Hermenegildo Rodrigues Valle and Augusta Campos Valle. He was born in Barbacena, a small city in Minas Gerais State. He never left Brazil and made few journeys to Rio de Janeiro during the first half of the 20th century.

Flausino Vale foi um compositor com idéias próprias. Autodidata e desbravador, ele conhecia perfeitamente o repertório musical de todas as épocas. Dominava com facilidade as composições para violino de Bach, Beethoven, Paganini e dos compositores da escola franco-belga. Além de ser advogado, jornalista, poeta, escritor e professor de história da música.

== Recordings ==
- (1994/95) Flausino Vale: Prelúdios característicos e concertantes para violino só (Jerzy Milewski) — Prefeitura Municipal de Barbacena / FUNDAC
  - (1999) Reissued in Acervo Funarte series
- (2011) Flausino Vale e o violino brasileiro (Cláudio Cruz) — Clássicos CLA019
