= String Sextet No. 2 (Brahms) =

Chamber ensemble composition by Johannes Brahms

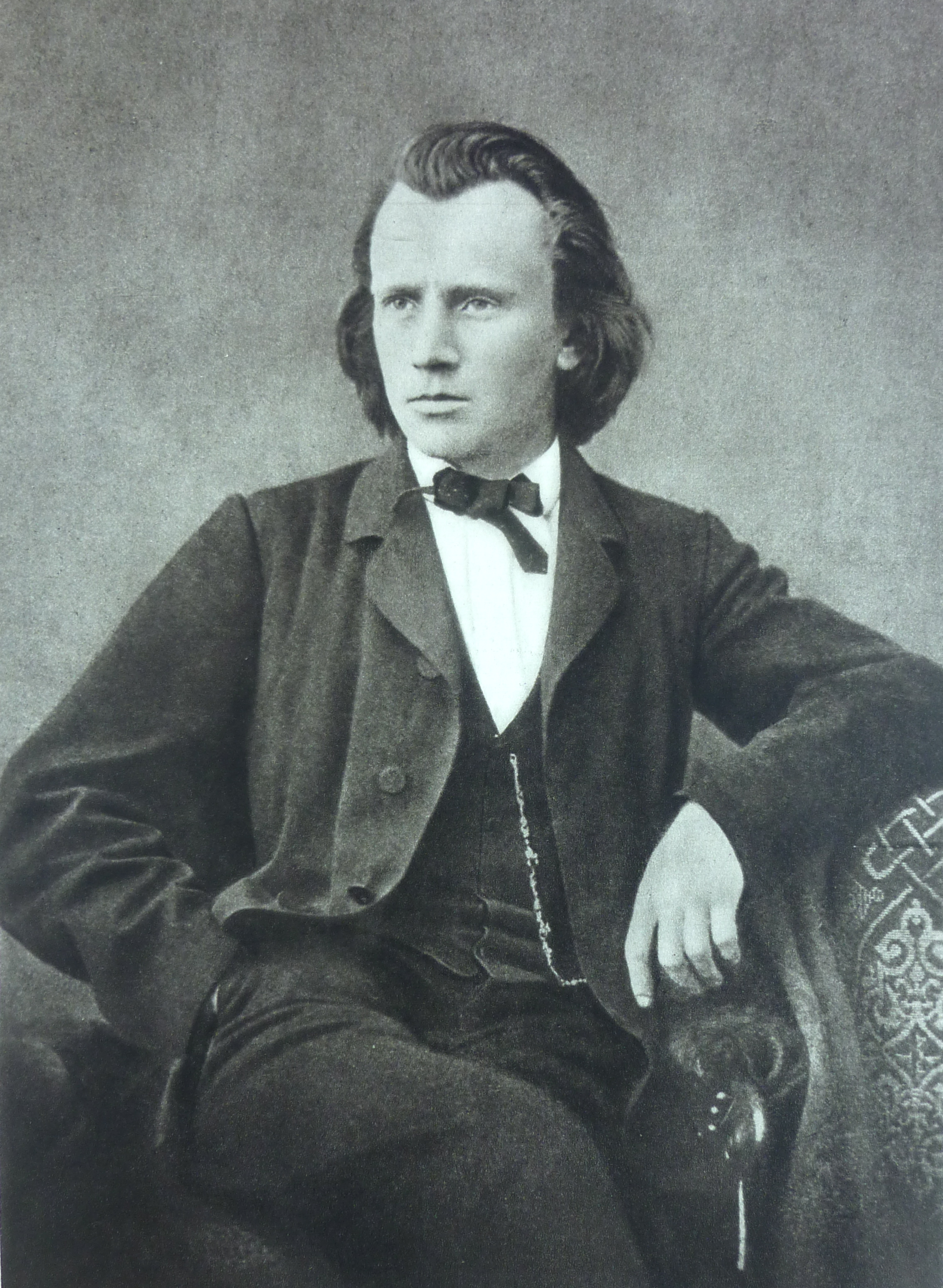
Johannes Brahms c. 1866

Johannes Brahms' String Sextet No. 2 in G major, Opus 36 was composed during the years of 1864–1865 (although it drew on material from earlier times) and published by the firm of Fritz Simrock. It was first performed in Boston, Massachusetts on October 11, 1866, with the European premiere following the next month in Zurich.

The work is scored for two violins, two violas, and two celli, and has four movements:

1. Allegro non troppo (G major)
2. Scherzo – Allegro non troppo – Presto giocoso (G minor)
3. Adagio (E minor)
4. Poco allegro (G major)

Brahms did most of the composition in the comfortable country surroundings of Lichtental, near Baden-Baden. The sextet includes a reference to the first name of Agathe von Siebold (to whom he had been briefly engaged some six years previously) in the first movement, bars 162–168, with the notes a-g-a-h-e.

The sextet is characterized by the exotic-sounding opening of its first movement, by innovative chord structures, and by its many contrasts, both technical and melodic.

== Arrangements ==
Brahms himself arranged the work for piano four-hands. Theodor Kirchner arranged it for piano trio. Swedish composer Kurt Atterberg arranged the sextet for string orchestra in 1939.

== Popular culture ==
The first movement of this sextet is prominent in the last sequence of Bertrand Blier's 1979 film Buffet froid.
