= Roy Hage =

Lebanese-American operatic tenor

- روي الحاج
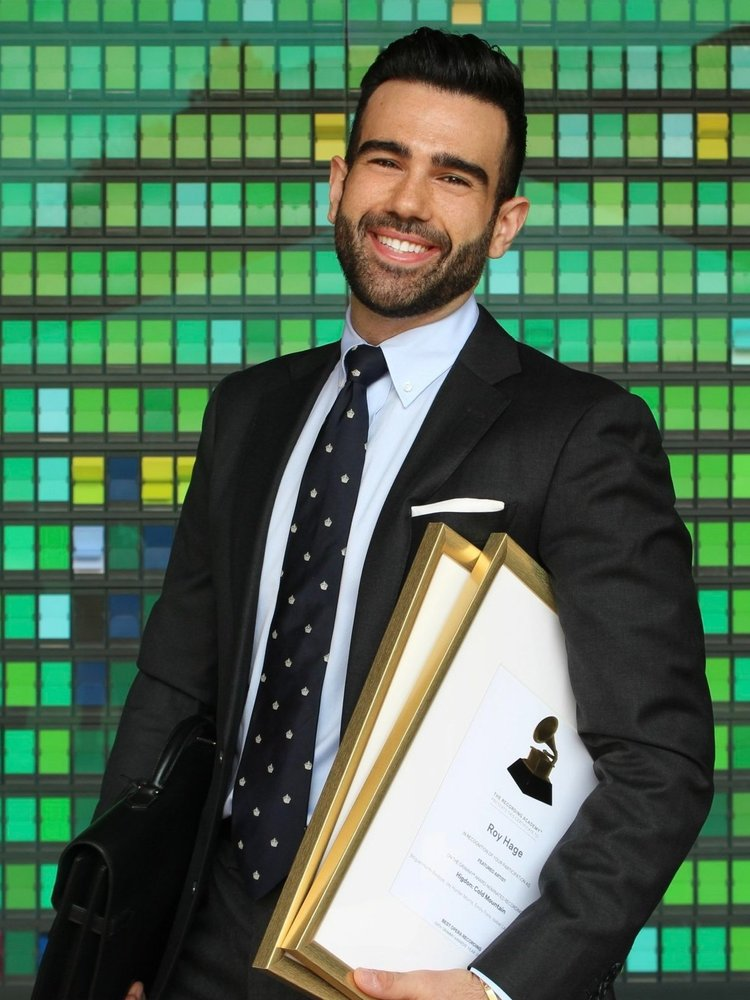
- Roy Hage in 2021 wearing a suit and tie, smiling in front of Stanford Graduate School of Business' Monument to Change
- Pronunciation: ɹɔɪ haʒ
- Born: New York City American
- Education: Stanford Graduate School of Business; Academy of Vocal Arts; Curtis Institute of Music; Yale University; Oberlin Conservatory; Interlochen Arts Academy

Roy Hage (Arabic: روي الحاج) is a Lebanese–American operatic tenor who attended Curtis Institute of Music and who performs in the United States and Lebanon. In 2013, Hage premiered the chamber version of Pulitzer Prize winner Steven Stucky's The Stars and the Roses. He created the role of Reid (Georgia Boy) in Jennifer Higdon's opera, Cold Mountain, whose recording of the Santa Fe Opera premiere was nominated for two Grammy Awards in 2017. Most recently, he performed the role of Lensky in Heartbeat Opera's production of Eugene Onegin.

== Career ==
Roy Hage has performed with ensembles including the Cleveland Orchestra, the Philadelphia Orchestra, the St. Louis Symphony Orchestra, New Jersey Symphony Orchestra, and Columbus Symphony Orchestra and has worked with conductors including Yannick Nezet-Seguin, Corrado Rovaris, Sir Richard Bonynge, Vladimir Ashkenazy, George Manahan, Caren Levine, Rossen Milanov, Xian Zhang, David Robertson, and Michael Christie.

In the United States, Hage has appeared in productions with Opera Philadelphia, Santa Fe Opera, Opera Theatre of Saint Louis, Heartbeat Opera, and Maryland Lyric Opera, among others, and festivals including the Aspen Music Festival, Chautauqua Music Festival, and Miami Music Festival.

== Premieres ==
- Steven Stucky: The Stars and the Roses (chamber version)
- Peter Ash: The Golden Ticket
- Jennifer Higdon: Cold Mountain (World and East Coast premieres)
- Theodore Morrison: Oscar (East Coast premiere)
- Kurt Rohde: “Three Minutes with Ned”
- Jonathan Bailey Holland: “Must All Then Amount to But This"
- Julia Pajot: "Demain dès l'aube"

== Selected roles ==
- Title role in Roméo et Juliette
- Title role in The Tales of Hoffmann
- Title role in Pélleas and Mélisande
- Title role in The Rake's Progress
- Title role in Candide
- Title role in La Clemenza di Tito
- Il Duca in Rigoletto
- Ruggero in La Rondine
- Nemorino in L'elisir d'amore
- Rinuccio in Gianni Schicchi
- Alfredo in La Traviata
- Le Chevalier des Grieux in Manon
- Le Chevalier de la Force in Dialogues des Carmélites
- Vaudemont in Iolanta
- Jeník in The Bartered Bride
- Ein Soldat in Der Kaiser von Atlantis
- An Italian Tenor in Capriccio
- Ein Tanzmeister in Ariadne auf Naxos
- Tamino in Die Zauberflöte
- Second Jew in Salome
- Arturo in Lucia di Lammermoor
- First Armored Man in Die Zauberflöte
- Gastone in La Traviata
- Goffredo in Rinaldo
- Reid (Georgia Boy) in Cold Mountain
- Home Guard Scout in Cold Mountain
- Horus in The Rose Elf
- The Beloved in The Rose Elf
- Oompa Loompa in The Golden Ticket
- Judge Danforth in The Crucible
- Sir Philip Wingrave in Owen Wingrave
- Prison Chaplain in Oscar
- Paul in Love Sick
