= Concerto for Orchestra No. 1 (Stucky) =

Composition by Steven Stucky

The Concerto for Orchestra No. 1 is a concerto for orchestra by the American composer Steven Stucky. The work was commissioned by the Philadelphia Orchestra with contributions from Johnson & Higgins for the bicentennial of the United States Constitution. It was composed from September 1986 through April 1987 and premiered October 27, 1988, with the Philadelphia Orchestra performing under conductor Riccardo Muti.

The piece was a finalist for the 1988 Pulitzer Prize for Music, losing to William Bolcom's 12 New Etudes for Piano. Stucky later won the award in 2005 for his Concerto for Orchestra No. 2.

== Structure ==
The work has a duration of roughly 30 minutes and is composed in three movements:

1. Allegro
2. Adagio
3. Comodo

== Reception ==
Aaron Keebaugh of the Boston Classical Review described it as "a piece that deserves to be heard more often" and wrote, "Listening to this piece is like experiencing the best influences of twentieth-century music. Jagged rhythms à la Bartók fuse with precision-cut Stravinskian phrases, and the work's commodious textures recall Lutosławski's own Concerto for Orchestra." Donal Henahan of The New York Times also compared the music to that of other 20th-century composers and gave the work lukewarm praise, remarking, "Orchestration is a strong point of Mr. Stucky. At least, he shows a welcome awareness of the need for contrasts in sonority and intensity. At first hearing, however, his piece left an impression of restlessness and fragmentation, of music waiting to be born."
