= Son et lumière =

Son et lumière is French for "sound and light", and may refer to:

- Son et lumière (show), a sound and light show
- "Son et Lumiere" (song), song by The Mars Volta on the album De-Loused in the Comatorium
- Son et lumière (composition), symphonic poem by Steven Stucky
- Son et Lumière (company), French television production company responsible for the series Engrenages, shown in English as Spiral
