= Gabriel Jenks =

American composer of concert music (born 1981)

Gabriel Jenks (born 1981) is an American composer of concert music who has taught at Yale School of Music, Mannes School of Music, and the Indiana University Jacobs School of Music.

== Biography ==
Gabriel Jenks was formerly known as Han/Hannah Lash. Some of his earlier music appears under those names.

Gabriel Jenks was born in Alfred, New York, USA on November 22, 1981, under the name Hannah Lash. He began his studies in music during early childhood, and continued to pursue music throughout his education. Jenks obtained a bachelor's degree in composition from the Eastman School of Music in 2004, a performance degree from the Cleveland Institute of Music in 2008, a PhD from Harvard University in 2010, and an Artist Diploma from the Yale School of Music in 2012. His primary teachers include Martin Bresnick, Bernard Rands, Julian Anderson, Steven Stucky, Augusta Read Thomas, and Robert Morris.

Jenks was appointed to the composition faculty of the Yale School of Music in 2013. During the 2013–14 season, Jenks served as Composer in Residence with the Alabama Symphony Orchestra, as well as being the Sound Investment Composer with the Los Angeles Chamber Orchestra. In 2016, Jenks composed new works for pianist Lisa Moore and loadbang for a Portrait Concert at Columbia University's Miller Theatre. In 2017–2018, Jenks' Piano Concerto No. 1 “In Pursuit of Flying” was given its premiere performances by Jeremy Denk and the Saint Paul Chamber Orchestra; the Atlantic Classical Orchestra debuted Facets of Motion for orchestra, and Music for Nine, Ringing was performed at the Music Academy of the West School and Festival. In 2018–2019, Paul Appleby and Natalia Katyukova gave the world premiere of Songs of Imagined Love, a song cycle commissioned by Carnegie Hall. Jenks' chamber opera, Desire, premiered at Columbia's Miller Theatre in October, 2019. Jenks is an accomplished harpist and often performs his own music on the harp. His Concerto for piano and harp was premiered in November 2019 by the Naples Philharmonic. In August 2020, Hub New Music premiered Jenks' The Nature of Breaking, with Jenks performing harp. And in November 2021, Jenks premiered his double harp concerto, The Peril of Dreams, with the Seattle Symphony and its principal harpist Valerie Muzzolini. Michael Schell wrote: "[Jenks'] 45-minute work manages to avoid the clichés and sentimentality to which harp music often succumbs".

In 2022, Jenks was appointed associate professor of music in Composition at the Jacobs School of Music at Indiana University.

Jenks' works have been commissioned by orchestras such as the Los Angeles Philharmonic, the Los Angeles Chamber Orchestra, the Alabama Symphony Orchestra, the American Composers Orchestra, the Minnesota Orchestra, and the Saint Paul Chamber Orchestra. His chamber music has been commissioned and performed by the JACK Quartet, the Da Capo Chamber Players, the Arditti Quartet, the Jupiter Quartet, loadbang, and Hub New Music, among others. His music has been presented in such venues as Carnegie Hall, the Walt Disney Concert Hall, (Le) Poisson Rouge, Tanglewood Music Center, Aspen Music Festival and School, the Great Lakes Chamber Music Festival, New York City Opera's VOX, and the Art Institute of Chicago.

Jenks' awards and honors include a Fromm Foundation Commission, a fellowship from Yaddo Artist Colony, the Naumburg Prize, the ASCAP Morton Gould Young Composer Award, a Charles Ives Scholarship (2011) and Charles Ives Fellowship (2016) from the American Academy of Arts and Letters, the Barnard Rogers Prize, and the Bernard and Rose Sernoffsky Prize.

Jenks' music is published by Schott.

== Selected works ==
Orchestral

- Music for Loss
- God Music Bug Music
- Hush
- Facets of Motion
- Forestallings
- Double Concerto
- Fault Lines (flute concerto)
- The Peril of Dreams

Chamber

- Total Internal Reflection (string quartet)
- Frayed (string quartet)
- Four Still (string quartet)
- Glockenliebe (three glockenspiels)
- C (piano and vibraphone)
- Filigree in Textile (harp and string quartet)
- Octet: Selves (violin consort or string orchestra)
- Folksongs (piccolo, percussion, harp)
- Subtilior, Lamento (flute, clarinet, piano, percussion, violin, cello)
- Friction, Pressure, Impact (cello and piano)
- Three Movements for Horn Trio (violin, horn, piano)
- The Nature of Breaking (harp and ensemble)
- Leander and Hero (wind quintet)

Choral

- Requiem Pro Avibus Mortuis (SATB choir plus alto and countertenor soloists)

Vocal/Dramatic

- Desire (chamber opera)
- Blood Rose (alto, countertenor, string quartet)
- Stoned Prince (male vocalist/actor, trumpet, trombone, bass clarinet)
- Violations (soprano, alto, countertenor, two pianos, two vibraphones, electronics)
- Songs of Imagined Love (piano and voice)

Solo

- Stalk (harp)
- Etudes, book 1 (piano)
- Secrets (trumpet and electronics)
- Silvers (“loeboe”)
