= Études (Ligeti) =

Set of études by György Ligeti

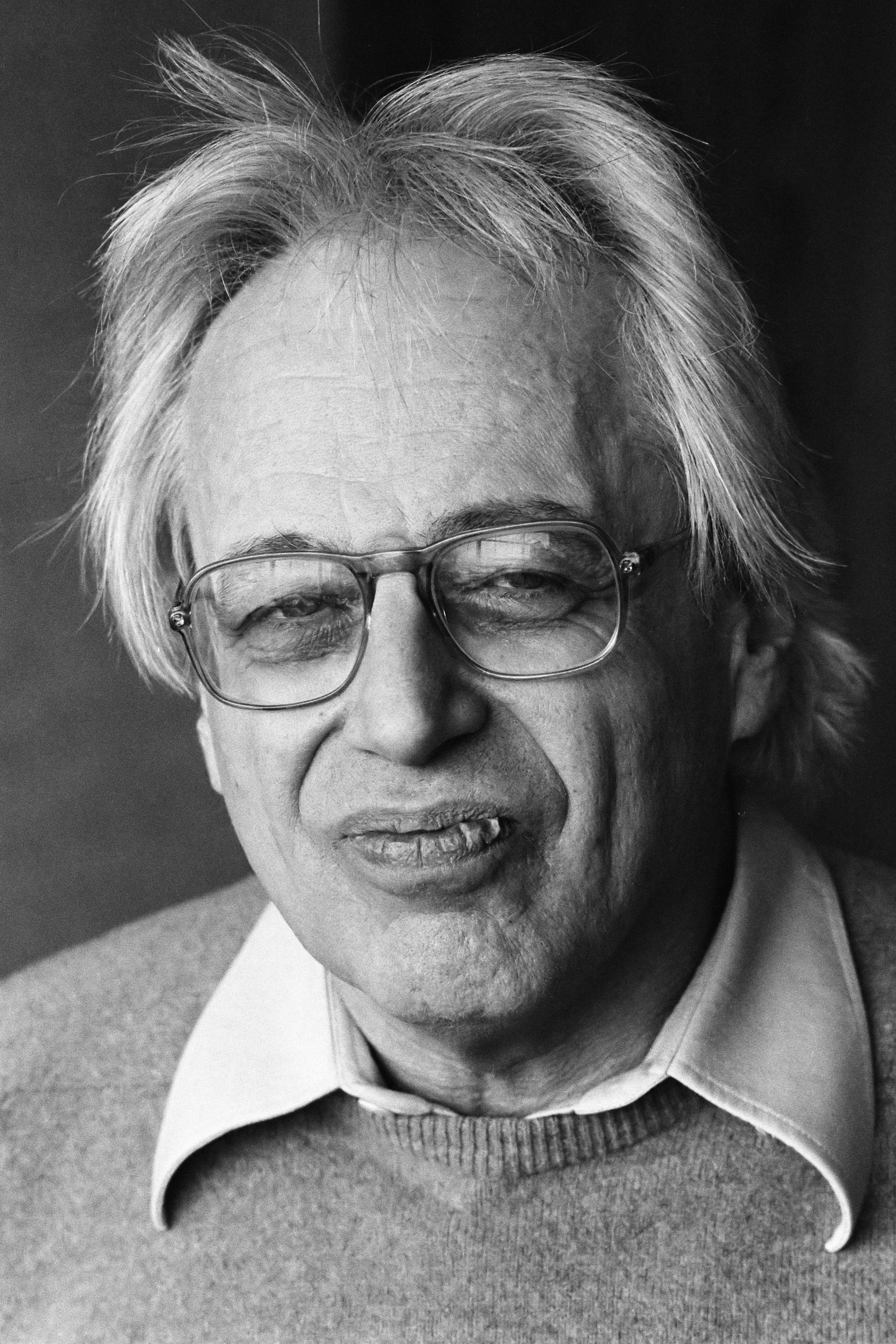
György Ligeti in 1984

The Hungarian composer György Ligeti composed a cycle of 18 études for solo piano between 1985 and 2001. They are considered one of the major creative achievements of his last decades, and one of the most significant sets of piano studies of the 20th century, combining virtuoso technical problems with expressive content, following in the line of the études of Frédéric Chopin, Franz Liszt, Claude Debussy, and Alexander Scriabin but addressing new technical ideas as a compendium of the concepts Ligeti had worked out in his other works since the 1950s. Pianist Jeremy Denk wrote that they "are a crowning achievement of his career and of the piano literature; though still new, they are already classics.".

== Scope of the work ==
There are 18 études arranged in three books or Livres: six Études in Book 1 (1985), eight in Book 2 (1988–1994), four in Book 3 (1995–2001). Ligeti's original intention had been to compose only twelve Études, in two books of six each, on the model of the Debussy Études, but the scope of the work grew because he enjoyed writing the pieces so much. Though the four Études of Book 3 form a satisfying conclusion to the cycle, Book 3 is in fact unfinished—Ligeti certainly intended to add more, but was unable to do so in his last years, when his productivity was much reduced owing to illness. The Études of Book 3 are generally calmer, simpler, and more refined in technique than those of Books 1 and 2.

=== Titles ===
The titles of the various études are a mixture of technical terms and poetic descriptions. Ligeti made lists of possible titles and the titles of the individual numbers were often changed between inception and publication. He often did not assign any title until after the work was completed.

== The 18 études ==
=== Book 1 ===
1. Désordre. Molto vivace, vigoroso, molto ritmico, = 63
  A study in fast polyrhythms moving up and down the keyboard. The right hand plays only white keys while the left hand is restricted to the black keys. This separates the hands into two pitch-class fields; the right hand music is diatonic, the left hand music is pentatonic. This étude is dedicated to Pierre Boulez.
2. Cordes à vide. Andantino rubato, molto tenero, = 96
  Simple, almost Satie-esque chords become increasingly complex. These chords are built primarily from fifths, reminiscent of open strings, hence the title. This étude is also dedicated to Pierre Boulez.
3. Touches bloquées. Vivacissimo, sempre molto ritmico – Feroce, impetuoso, molto meno vivace – Feroce, estrepitoso – Tempo I
  Two different rhythmic patterns interlock. One hand plays rapid, even melodic patterns while the other hand 'blocks' some of the keys by silently depressing them. This is the last étude Ligeti dedicated to Boulez.
4. Fanfares. Vivacissimo, molto ritmico, = 63, con alegria e slancio
  Melody and accompaniment frequently exchange roles in this polyrhythmic study which features aksak-influenced rhythms and an ostinato in 8/8 time, dividing the bar of 8 eighth notes into 3+2+3. This étude contains a bar where pppppppp (8 ps) is used. This ostinato is also used in the second movement of Ligeti's Horn Trio. This étude is dedicated to Volker Banfield.
5. Arc-en-ciel. Andante con eleganza, with swing, ca. 84
  The music rises and falls in arcs that seem to evoke a rainbow. This étude is dedicated to Louise Sibourd.
6. Automne à Varsovie. Presto cantabile, molto ritmico e flessibile, = 132
  Its title, Autumn in Warsaw, refers to the Warsaw Autumn, an annual festival of contemporary music. Ligeti referred to this étude as a "tempo fugue". A study in polytempo, it consists of a continuous transformation of the initial descending figure – the "lamento motif" as Ligeti called it – involving overlapping groups of 3, 4, 5, 6, 7, 8, ending up at the bottom of the keyboard. This étude is dedicated to Ligeti's Polish friends.

=== Book 2 ===
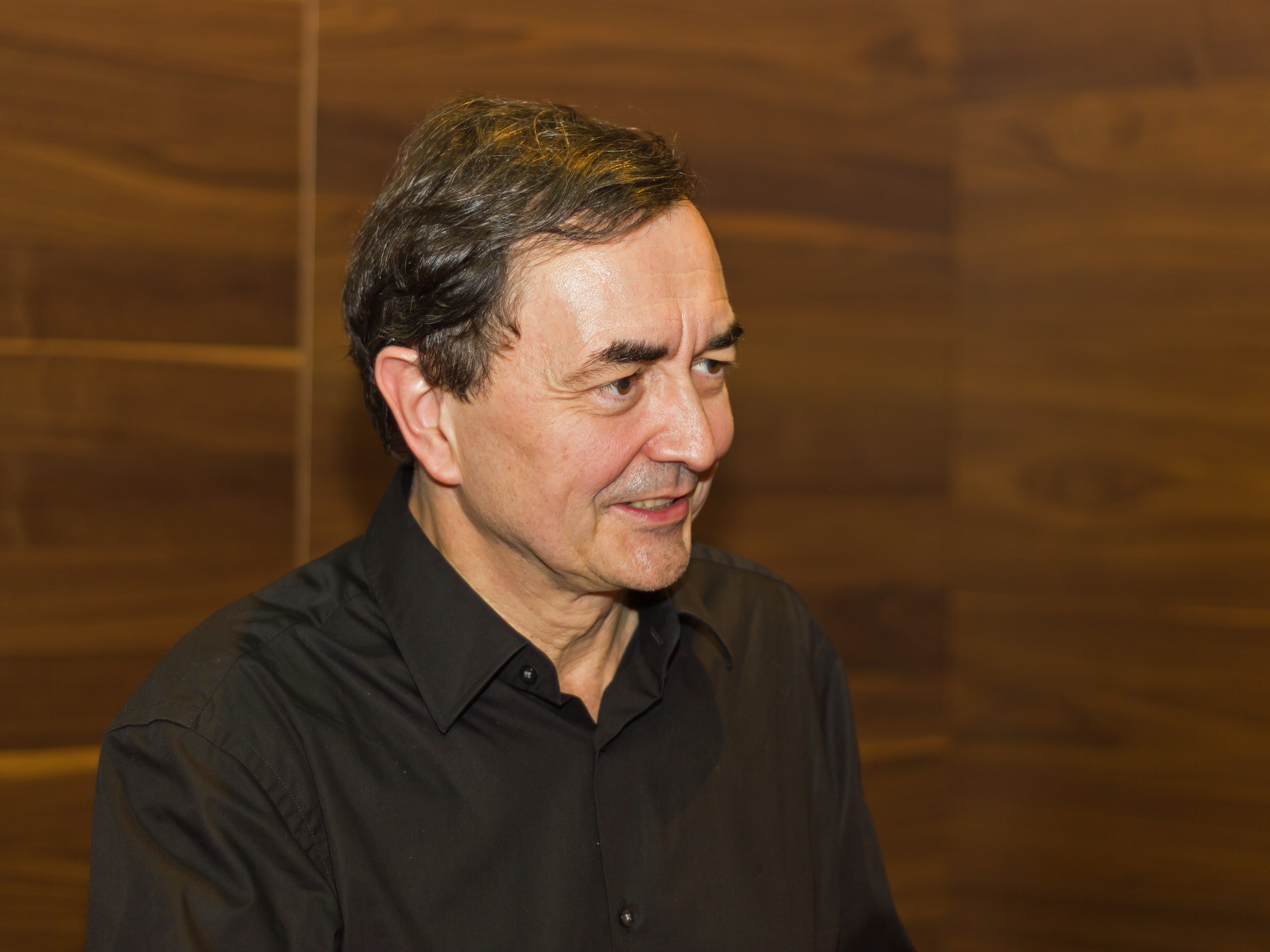
Two of the études are dedicated to pianist Pierre-Laurent Aimard

7. Galamb Borong. Vivacissimo luminoso, legato possible, = 40 or faster – semplice, da lontano
  The title sounds Javanese, reflecting the piece's inspiration in gamelan music, but in fact both words are actually Hungarian and mean roughly "melancholic pigeon". As in Désordre, the two hands play complementary scales; in this case, they each play one of the two whole-tone scales. This étude is dedicated to Ulrich Eckhardt.
8. Fém. Vivace risoluto, con vigore, = 30 ( = 180, . = 120)
  The title is the Hungarian word for metal. Based on chords of the open fifth, with short, irregular, asymmetrically grouped melodic fragments playing off one another. This étude is dedicated to pianist Volker Banfield.
9. Vertige. Prestissimo sempre molto legato, = 48
  Widely-separated hands use chromatic scales to create the effect of endless, falling movement, and ends with a diminuendo to pppppppp (8 ps). This étude is dedicated to composer Mauricio Kagel. Ligeti did not complete another étude for three years after finishing Vertige.
10. Der Zauberlehrling (The Sorcerer's Apprentice). Prestissimo, staccatissimo, leggierissimo
  A dancing melodic line is kept in perpetual motion by irregularly dispersed staccato accents. This étude is dedicated to pianist Pierre-Laurent Aimard.
11. En Suspens. Andante con moto, = 98
  Six beats per bar in the right hand, four in the left hand, irregular phrase-lengths and accents in both, weave an ethereal and rather jazz-like web of harmony. This étude is dedicated to composer György Kurtág.
12. Entrelacs. Vivacissimo molto ritmico, = 100 ( = 65)
  Criss-crossing rhythmic patterns, increasing in dynamics as they traverse the keyboard from left to right, creating up to seven different metrical layers. This étude is dedicated to pianist Pierre-Laurent Aimard.
13. L'escalier du diable (The Devil's Staircase). Presto legato, ma leggiero, = 30
  A hard-driving toccata that moves polymetrically up and down the keyboard featuring an ascending chromatic-scale motif then turns into an impression of bells ringing in different registers and times, and a passage marked at ffffff (6 fs) that progresses to a ffffffff (8 fs) with notes marked with three accents (>) and three marcato (∧). At more than five minutes in duration, this is the longest étude of the set. It is dedicated to pianist Volker Banfield.
14. „Coloana infinită“ (Infinite Column). Presto possible, tempestoso con fuoco, = 105
  The étude is named for Constantin Brâncuși's sculpture of the same name, a repetitive series of expanding and contracting pyramidal shapes, and features loud, ascending chord-sequences that overlap giving the impression of constant upward motion. This étude is dedicated to Vincent Meyer. This piece is a revised version of the etude later published as No. 14A: „Coloana fără sfârșit“ (see Related Works below).

=== Book 3 ===
15. White on White. Andante con tenerezza, = 52
  A white-key study except for the very end, beginning with a serene canon and with a whirling fast middle section. This étude is dedicated to Étienne Courant.
16. Pour Irina. Andante con espressione, rubato, molto legato, = 72 – Allegro con moto, sempre legato, = 152 – Allegro vivace – Molto vivace
  Another étude with a gentle beginning, becoming more and more frenetic due to the introduction of progressively shorter note-values and additional pitches. The étude is dedicated to Irina Kataeva.
17. À bout de souffle (Out of Breath). Presto con bravura
  A manic two-part canon that ends abruptly with slow pianissimo chords. This étude is dedicated to mathematician Heinz-Otto Peitgen.
18. Canon. Vivace poco rubato – Prestissimo
  A short canon between the hands, played once vivace and then a second time presto impossibile, with a slow quiet chordal canon to finish with. This étude is dedicated to Fabienne Wyler.

=== Related works ===
Étude No. 14A: „Coloana fără sfârșit“ (Column without End) was the first version of Etude 14 but was judged too physically demanding for a human player, so Ligeti recomposed it, changing the harmonic structure as he reduced the number of pitches in each hand. Subsequently the original form was arranged as a separate étude for player-piano by Jürgen Hocker, but some pianists have in fact played it.

The single piano piece L'arrache-cœur (1994) was apparently originally intended to be Étude No. 11 but did not become part of the cycle.
