= Concerto Mediterraneo =

Composition by Steven Stucky

The Concerto Mediterraneo is a concerto for classical guitar and orchestra by the American composer Steven Stucky. The work was completed in April 1998 and was written to commemorate the life of the Greek guitarist Sophocles Papas. It was first performed on September 17, 1998, at the Joseph Meyerhoff Symphony Hall in Baltimore by the guitarist Manuel Barrueco and the Baltimore Symphony Orchestra under the conductor Günther Herbig.

== Composition ==
=== Background ===
Stucky was approached to compose the concerto as a tribute to the guitarist Sophocles Papas at the request of Papas's daughter, Elizabeth Papas Smith, and Dr. Solomon H. Snyder, a former student of Papas. Stucky began work on the piece in late 1997, composing the third movement during a stay along the Italian Riviera. He subsequently wrote the finale and introductory movements in Ithaca, New York, and completed the work on April 8, 1998.

=== Structure ===
The Concerto Mediterraneo has a duration of roughly 20 minutes and is composed in four movements:

1. Serenata
2. Interludio
3. Ciaccona notturna
4. Finale

=== Instrumentation ===
The work is scored for solo guitar and an orchestra comprising two flutes, two oboes, two clarinets, two bassoons, two French horns, trumpet, trombone, timpani, two percussionists, harp, and strings.

== Reception ==
Reviewing the world premiere, Pierre Ruhe of The Washington Post lauded the concerto, writing:

The 20-minute, four-movement piece rarely raises its voice above an inviting, relaxed mezzo forte. Modernist techniques in the score blend with the often lovely guitar lines and soft-edged support from the orchestra. These exquisite phrases suited Manuel Barrueco, the lightly amplified soloist, just fine. He savored the delicate and fragile touches, although much of the piece seemed unidiomatic for the guitar. Single notes and runs up the fingerboard sometimes made it sound like it could be comfortably transcribed for another instrument. Despite the title one could imagine an Asian influence in the concerto. It's a work well worth hearing again.

Stephen Wigler of The Baltimore Sun was more critical, however, calling it "disappointing" and remarking, "Stucky tried to provide Barrueco with opportunities for intimacy in the first two movements by presenting the guitar in chamber-music-like settings and even in duets with other instruments. Unfortunately, it was often the scoring for the other instruments that kept the ear in anticipation." Despite this criticism, Wigler added:

My response might change upon repeated exposure to the work. I found the third movement, whose Italian subtitle translates as "nocturnal chaconne," compelling in its logic and more intriguing than earlier movements in the ways it set the guitar against the orchestra. And the composer's perpetual motion final movement provided many opportunities for Barrueco to display his remarkable virtuosity.
