= Charles Rosen =

American pianist and writer on music

Rosen in 1973 on a tour of Southern Africa (Note: Photo dedicated to Hans Adler.)

Charles Welles Rosen (May 5, 1927 – December 9, 2012) was an American pianist and music critic. He is remembered for his career as a concert pianist, for his recordings, and for his many writings. He won the National Book Award for Arts and Letters for The Classical Style.

== Life and career ==
=== Youth and education ===
Charles Rosen was born in New York City on May 5, 1927, to a Russian-Jewish immigrant couple, Irwin Rosen, an architect, and Anita Rosen (née Gerber), a semiprofessional actress and amateur pianist.

Rosen began his musical studies at age 4 and at age 6 enrolled in the Juilliard School. At age 11 he left Juilliard to study piano with Moriz Rosenthal, and with Rosenthal's wife, Hedwig Kanner. Rosenthal, born in 1862, had been a student of Franz Liszt. Rosenthal's memories of the 19th century in classical music were communicated to his pupil and appear frequently in Rosen's later writings. (For instance, in Critical Entertainments, Rosen offers a memory from Rosenthal concerning how Brahms performed on the piano; specifically that he "rolled" chords upward, starting with the bass note.) Every year from the ages of three to twelve, Rosen heard Josef Hofmann play, and he later suggested that Hofmann had a greater influence on him than Rosenthal. (Note: In an interview published in the June 2007 edition of the BBC Music Magazine, Rosen recalled having played for Leopold Godowsky at age seven; Godowsky asked Rosen what he would like to be when he grew up, and, to Godowsky's amusement, Rosen answered, "I want to be a pianist like Józef Hofmann." In the same interview Rosen named Arturo Toscanini as a great influence.)

Rosen's family background was not a wealthy one. The Guardian editor Nicholas Wroe interviewed Rosen in his old age, and reported:

His father had lost his job during the depression and "things were pretty tough for a while". The family moved from Washington Heights to a ho[me] in the then less fashionable Upper West Side, where Rosen still lives. Because money was so short Rosen's parents arranged a contract with the Rosenthals not to pay them for Charles's tuition, but instead to give them 15% of his earnings as a pianist until the age of 21. "As I didn't make my debut in New York until I was 23, it was not a very satisfactory deal. But when I made my first recording I took some money to Hedwig [Kanner] Rosenthal, who was very surprised because she had been teaching me for 13 or 14 years at that stage."

At age 17, Rosen enrolled at Princeton University, where he studied French, and also took courses in mathematics and philosophy. When he graduated in 1947, he was offered a fellowship of $2,000 to continue at Princeton in the French graduate program. He completed a PhD in 1951 with a dissertation on the poetry of Jean de La Fontaine under E.B.O. Borgerhoff. While in graduate school he roomed with his fellow student Michael Steinberg, who also went on to become a classical-music critic and renowned scholar in his own right. On a Fulbright fellowship, Rosen then went to Paris to continue to examine the relationship between poetry and music in sixteenth-century France.

Rosen attained his status as a musical scholar with very little classroom training. Although the New Grove Dictionary of Music and Musicians refers to him as a student of the musicologist Oliver Strunk, Rosen never formally studied musicology with Strunk or anyone else. (Note: Rosen, Charles, "Τα μόνα προβλήματα της μουσικής είναι ...όλα τα υπόλοιπα." (The only problems of music are... all the rest) Interview by Paris Konstantinidis. Highlights, 35, Athens, July–August 2008, 152–154) Rosen's extensive knowledge of music appears to have arisen partly from a culturally rich family background, and partly from reading. As Wroe reported:

Through the Rosenthals, Rosen was connected to the New York musical scene. ... [He] says that by the time he went to Princeton, he knew all the music department socially. "So that made me too proud to take a degree in music, which I thought would be too easy. I sound like a snotty bastard, which I might have been, but I really did know more music as an undergraduate than the postgraduate students."

Ivan Hewett suggests that a major temptation of Rosen's 1947 fellowship offer was that it offered him time to practice and to read extensively in the Princeton library.

=== Launching his musical career ===
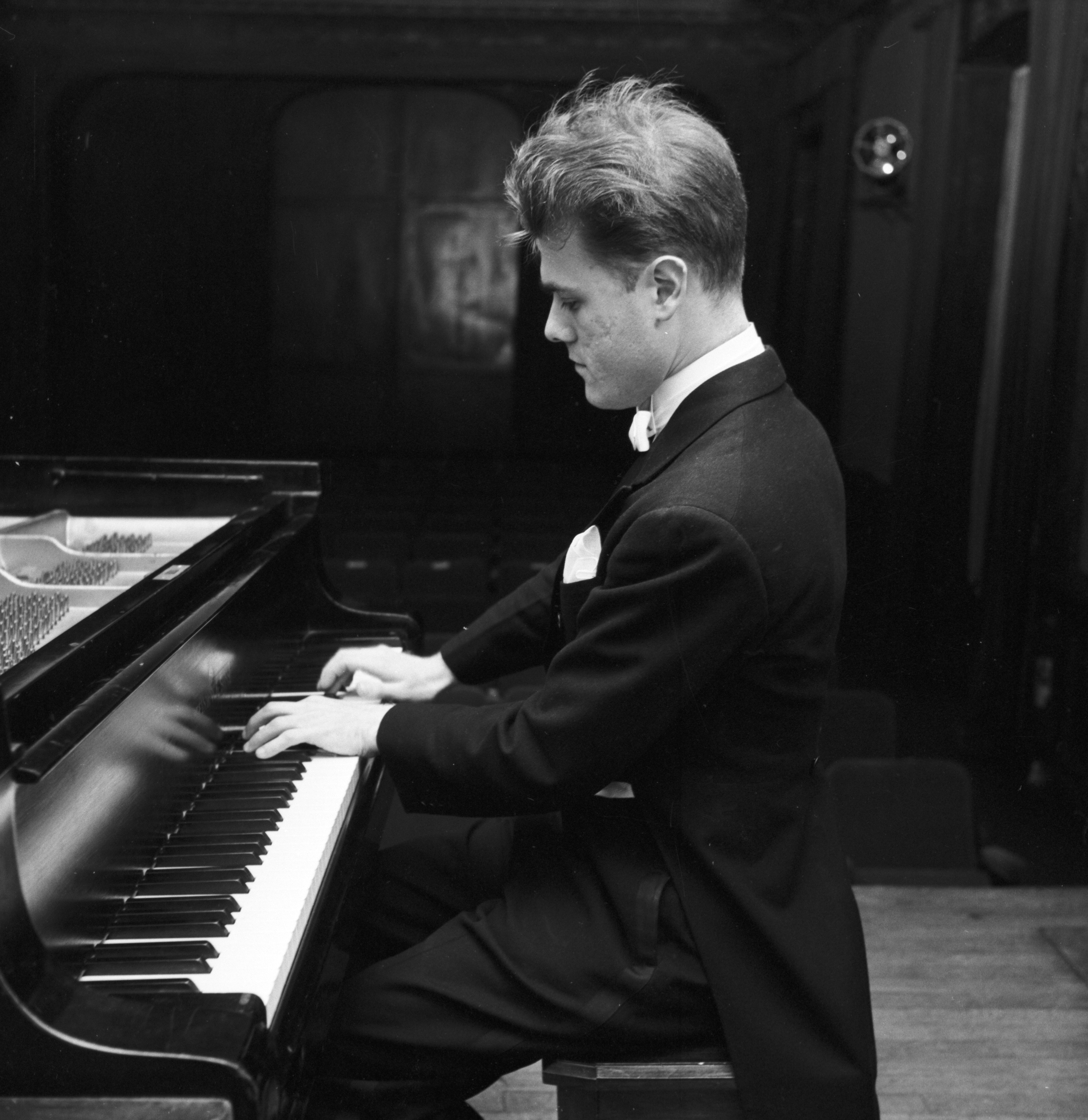
At the piano

The year 1951 was a busy one for Rosen: he completed his French Literature Ph.D., gave his first piano recital, and made his first recordings, of works by Martinu and Haydn. His career as a pianist made progress only slowly at first, and he traveled to Paris on a Fulbright scholarship to study the relationship between poetry and music in 16th-century France. In 1953 he moved to the Massachusetts Institute of Technology to teach French. He described this period to Nicholas Wroe:

I suppose I could have stayed on as an academic, but I never intended to do anything but play the piano. The only time I taught was when my playing would only support me for half a year, but I could only get a full-time job. So I taught French at MIT Monday to Wednesday, but Thursday through Sunday I was a pianist. In 1955, after two years there, I got an offer from Columbia Artists Management and so I resigned.

The Columbia offer initiated his successful career as a concert pianist: Rosen appeared in numerous recitals and orchestral engagements around the world. Musicologist Stanley Sadie reviewed his pianism as follows:

As a pianist, Rosen is intense, severe and intellectual. His playing of Brahms and Schumann has been criticized for lack of expressive warmth; in music earlier and later he has won consistent praise. His performance of Bach's Goldberg Variations is remarkable for its clarity, its vitality and its structural grasp; he has also recorded The Art of Fugue in performances of exceptional lucidity of texture. His Beethoven playing (he specializes in the late sonatas, particularly the Hammerklavier) is notable for its powerful rhythms and its unremitting intellectual force. In Debussy his attention is focussed rather on structural detail than on sensuous beauty. He is a distinguished interpreter of Schoenberg and Webern.

Rosen made a large number of recordings, including recording various 20th century works at the invitation of their composers:

- Igor Stravinsky: Movements for Piano and Orchestra
- Elliott Carter: Double Concerto for Harpsichord and Piano with Two Chamber Orchestras
- Pierre Boulez: complete works for piano

In 1955, he recorded six Scarlatti's sonatas and Mozart's sonata K. 333 on the historical Siena Piano.

His recordings include earlier literature such as Debussy's Études (1958), Schumann's works for solo piano, Beethoven's late sonatas and Diabelli Variations, and Bach's Art of Fugue and Goldberg Variations. (Note: In the cited BBC interview, Rosen noted that he refused to perform the last-named work complete in concert, expressing a belief that it was intended for home study and cannot be played as Bach would have intended except in solitude, for personal pleasure.)

=== Career as a writer and teacher ===
Rosen's career as an author and scholar began only when he had passed the age of 40. Nicholas Wroe narrates how he started writing:

Rosen released his first Chopin recording in 1960. It included one of the late nocturnes, opus 62 no 1 ... Rosen says he wasn't entirely happy with the recording, but he was even more disappointed with the sleeve note, which described the nocturne as "staggering drunken with the odour of flowers". "I had many thoughts about the piece," he says. "That was not one of them. So I started writing the sleeve notes myself. People liked them and after a while a publisher took me to lunch. Before he even offered me a drink he said he would publish whatever I'd like to write. Eventually it led to many books and articles. But to begin with I wrote just to keep nonsense off my record sleeves."

In 1970 Rosen wrote his first column for The New York Review of Books—a scathing review of the then-current edition of the Harvard Dictionary of Music. (Note: Reprinted in Critical Entertainments.) His association with the magazine continued for the rest of his life. A number of his books collect essays and reviews he wrote for the Review.

In 1971, Rosen published his first and most famous book, The Classical Style. This work was highly successful, winning a National Book Award; and initiated a long series of books.

At various points in his career Rosen took positions as a university professor. His early stint teaching French at MIT is mentioned above. His later teaching was in music, in part-time or visiting positions offered to Rosen after he had achieved fame in his scholarly work. At Harvard University he held the Charles Eliot Norton Chair of Poetics in 1980/1981; the public lectures he gave there served as the basis of The Romantic Generation. He taught one academic quarter per year at the University of Chicago from 1985 to 1996. He taught at Stony Brook University starting in 1971, the University of Oxford (1988) and the Royal Northern College of Music.

Even after the scholarly phase of his career had set in, Rosen continued to perform as a pianist for the rest of his life.

He gave his last lecture on April 18, 2012, in the series Music in 21st-Century Society, at the Barry S. Brook Center for Music Research and Documentation of the CUNY Graduate Center.

Rosen died of cancer on December 9, 2012, in New York City, aged 85. His collection of scores and manuscripts was donated to the Music Department of the Graduate Center, City University of New York.

== Books and other writings ==
Rosen was the author of many acclaimed books about music, among them:

- The Classical Style (1971), his most famous work, which analyzes the nature and evolution of the style of the Classical period as it was developed by Haydn, Mozart and Beethoven. Rosen revised the work in 1997, leaving most of the text intact but adding a second chapter on Beethoven and a preface addressing comments on the first edition.
- Sonata Forms (1980), which is in some ways a follow-up to The Classical Style, is an intensive analysis of the primary musical form used in the classical era. Rosen wrote the work when his intended contribution to the New Grove on sonata form was rejected by the editors; he enlarged the article he had written into book form.
- The Romantic Generation (1995), which is centered on the early generation of Romantic composers, including Chopin, Liszt, Schumann, Mendelssohn, and Berlioz.
- Beethoven's Piano Sonatas: A Short Companion (2001), which gives general background on these famous works as well as sonata-by-sonata advice for performers.
- Critical Entertainments: Music Old and New (2001), a compilation of essays originally published in magazines and scholarly journals, mostly The New York Review of Books. It covers a variety of topics, including Oliver Strunk; the work of various composers; the status of contemporary music, and the "New Musicology".
- Piano Notes: The World of the Pianist (2002), an account of the concert pianist's world, addressed to the general reader. It covers piano technique, the instrument itself, the culture of piano performance, and the repertoire for the instrument.
- "Schubert's inflections of Classical form", a chapter of the Cambridge Companion to Schubert.

Rosen also published in other areas of the humanities: Romanticism and Realism: The Mythology of Nineteenth-Century Art, and Romantic Poets, Critics, and Other Madmen.

=== Aspects of Rosen's writing ===
In the introduction to Critical Entertainments, Rosen stated that his main goal in writing about music was "to increase the listener's engagement with the music". Alluding to the unhappy sleeve note for Chopin's nocturne opus 62 no 1 mentioned above, he wrote:

A Chopin recording I made ... had some notes that quoted James Huneker on one of the late nocturnes, which claimed that it "staggered drunken with the odor of flowers." This was not my view of the work ... Huneker's style is an invitation to the listener to dream, to dissipate attention into reverie. The writing about music that I prefer – and the performances of it, as well – fix and intensify the listener's attention. When I hear music, I prefer to lose myself in it, not drift outside in my own personal world with the music as a decorative and distant background. (Note: Critical Entertainments pp. 1–2)

In pursuing this goal, Rosen often appealed to technical aspects of musical description, including the theories of harmony and musical form. In a New Yorker blog post, Jeremy Denk rhapsodically describes this aspect of Rosen's work:

My favorite, life-changing parts of The Classical Style are the blow-by-blow accounts of great passages of music in the wonkiest of terms. He delves into the exposition of Mozart's piano concerto in E-flat, K. 271, showing how each new idea fulfills various needs raised by the last, while leaving others still open: a continuous game of symmetry and asymmetry, expectation and fulfillment, hiding beneath the innocent surface. ... Charles insists on addressing the notes; but he shows us how behind the notes are felt needs, requirements, laws of how things ought to be—a whole system of judgment, of taste, of meaning. ... The book ... occasionally feels like a page-turner, a thriller: these three geniuses—Haydn, Mozart, Beethoven—building on each other's discoveries, like scientists almost, creating unprecedented inventions, invoking a golden era of form meeting content.

Another goal of the work is to set each composer's work in its historical and cultural background, describing the forms of composition that served as a musical background for a composer in his formative years and then illuminating his contributions. For example, Rosen largely sees Beethoven in the context of the Classical-period tradition from which he emerged, rather than anachronistically as a forerunner of the later Romantic movement. Indeed, Rosen makes a strong case that the Romantic movement in music emerged from a rejection of the principles on which Beethoven composed; and that the veneration the Romantics held for Beethoven was in some ways an impediment to their best work.

Rosen was unafraid to make strong generalizations about the music he studied; i.e. he frequently pointed out aspects of the music claimed to be invariably or almost invariably present. Here are examples.

The first section of a sonata exposition always has an increasingly animated texture. (Sonata Forms, p. 238)

The opening of a work by Mozart is always solidly based [i.e., in the tonic key], no matter how ambiguous and disturbing its expressive significance, while the most unassuming first measures of a quartet by Haydn are far more unstable, more immediately charged with a dynamic movement away from the tonic. (The Classical Style, 186)

In this respect Chopin is one of the least pianistic of composers: a change of harmony [= a passage repeated later in a piece in a different key] that makes the original figuration exceedingly awkward does not lead him to change the figuration, and he always refuses to adapt his musical thought to the convenience of the hand. (The Romantic Generation, p. 364)

From time to time Rosen wielded his pen as a rapier, skewering other authors. He generally expressed his criticisms with a dose of wit, mixing damnation with faint praise, (Note: Jeremy Denk makes this point (as well as the one in the previous paragraph) thus: "He is rarely shy about the broad assertion, or about the perfect poison insult, delivered with a smile.") as in the following discussion of a contribution by Richard Taruskin to a volume on historically informed performance:

Taruskin writes brilliantly and at the top of his voice, and his most crushing arguments are often reserved for opinions that no one really holds. He asserts: "To presume that the use of historical instruments guarantees a historical result is simply preposterous." No doubt. Still, Taruskin beats his dead horses with infectious enthusiasm, and some of them have occasional twitches of life. (Note: Critical Entertainments p. 204)

Such passages were balanced by a fair amount of praise and appreciation (if not systematic citation) of others' work.

Rosen's prodigious memory for facts occasionally failed him, letting elementary factual errors creep into his work. Sometimes he would apologize for the errors in reprinted editions, retaining them in the text as a sort of self-reprimand. Thus chapter 7 of Critical Entertainments, a reprinted essay, begins with an appended comment:

At the opening of the following essay, the mistake of calling Joseph II the emperor Franz Joseph is so egregious that I have let it stand in the text in the hope that the public humiliation will make me more careful in the future. Several readers wrote to signal other mistakes…

=== Critical assessment ===
The musicologist Mark DeVoto has written of Rosen:

Charles Rosen was a comprehensive musician, an outstanding pianist and one of the best writers on music ever. The scope of his knowledge was immense, and its depth showed on every page of his many and various books and articles, from The Classical Style to The Romantic Generation to Sonata Forms, and even to books on Schoenberg and Elliott Carter. Today's students and knowledgeable music lovers return to Rosen's writings again and again, not only to read about the great composers and their works, but to comprehend them historically and as components of the literary and dramatic traditions, which Rosen knew thoroughly.

== Awards and honors ==
- For The Classical Style: the U.S. National Book Award in category Arts and Letters.
- Elected to the American Academy of Arts and Sciences (1974).
- Elected to the American Philosophical Society (1995)
- For The Romantic Generation: the Otto Kinkeldey award of the American Musicological Society (1996).
- Honorary doctorates from the University of Cambridge and Durham University.
- For his recording of the complete piano works of Boulez: the Edison Prize (Netherlands).
- For his recordings of the late Beethoven piano sonatas and of the Diabelli Variations: Grammy Award nominations.
- A National Humanities Medal, awarded by President Obama February 13, 2012, in a ceremony in the East Room of the White House.
- An opera entitled The Classical Style was created in his honor by librettist Jeremy Denk and composer Steven Stucky. It was premiered at the Ojai Music Festival, June 13, 2014.

== Bibliography ==
- The Classical Style (1971, 2nd expanded ed., 1997, New York: Norton): ISBN 0-393-31712-9
- Schoenberg (1976, Fontana Modern Masters)
- The Musical Languages of Elliott Carter (1984, Washington, D.C.: Music Division, Research Services, Library of Congress)
- Romanticism and Realism: The Mythology of Nineteenth-Century Art (with Henri Zerner; 1985, New York: Norton): ISBN 0-393-30196-6
- Sonata Forms (2nd ed., 1988, New York: Norton): ISBN 0-393-30219-9
- The Frontiers of Meaning: Three Informal Lectures on Music (1994, New York: Hill and Wang): ISBN 1-871082-65-X
- Arnold Schoenberg (1996, Chicago: University of Chicago Press): ISBN 0-691-02706-4
- The Romantic Generation (1995, Cambridge: Harvard University Press): ISBN 0-674-77934-7
- Romantic Poets, Critics, and Other Madmen (2000, Cambridge: Harvard University Press): ISBN 0-674-77951-7
- Beethoven's Piano Sonatas: A Short Companion (2001, New Haven: Yale University Press): ISBN 0-300-09070-6
- Critical Entertainments: Music Old and New (2001, Cambridge: Harvard University Press): ISBN 0-674-00684-4
- Piano Notes: The World of the Pianist (2002, Free Press): ISBN 0-7432-4312-9
- Variations on the Canon, edited by Robert Curry et al. (2008, University of Rochester Press): a collection of essays by noted scholars and musicians, published on the occasion of Rosen's 80th birthday. It contains writings on Rosen's critical methods (and other topics), a previously unpublished essay by Rosen himself, and concludes with listings of all his recordings and published writings up to the date of publication.
- Music and Sentiment (2010, New Haven: Yale University Press): ISBN 0-300-12640-9
- Freedom and the Arts: Essays on Music and Literature (2012, Cambridge: Harvard University Press)
- The Joy of Playing, the Joy of Thinking: Conversations About Art and Performance. [Interviews with Catherine Temerson, translated from the French by Catherine Zerner.] (2020, Cambridge: Harvard University Press): ISBN 9780674988460
