= The Classical Style =

Book by Charles Rosen

The Classical Style: Haydn, Mozart, Beethoven
- Author: Charles Rosen
- Language: English
- Published: April 21, 1971 (Viking Press)
- Publication place: United States
- Media type: Print
- Pages: 467 (first edition)
- ISBN: 0393317129

The Classical Style: Haydn, Mozart, Beethoven is a book by the American pianist and author Charles Rosen. The book analyses the evolution of style during the Classical period of classical music as it was developed through the works of Joseph Haydn, Wolfgang Amadeus Mozart, and Ludwig van Beethoven.

The Classical Style was first published on April 21, 1971, by Viking Press. Rosen later revised the work, complete with a new chapter, an updated preface, and a companion CD specifically recorded for the new edition. This second version was published through W. W. Norton & Company in 1998.

== Reception ==
The Classical Style has been critically lauded since its publication. In the original The New York Times review, Edward T. Cone called it a "thoughtful and illuminating study" and "a book for which both musicians and music-lovers should be grateful."

The book won the 1972 National Book Award for Arts and Letters. It is still the only book on music to win the award.

== Legacy ==
In 2014, the pianist Jeremy Denk (as librettist) and the composer Steven Stucky created the comic opera The Classical Style in honor of the work. The piece premiered June 13, 2014 at the Ojai Music Festival.
