= Rhapsodies for Orchestra =

Rhapsodies for Orchestra is a single-movement orchestral composition by the American composer Steven Stucky. The work was jointly commissioned by the New York Philharmonic and the BBC for the philharmonic's European tour in August and September 2008. The piece had its world premiere August 28, 2008, in Royal Albert Hall at The Proms, with the New York Philharmonic performing under conductor Lorin Maazel.

== Composition ==
In approaching Stucky with the commission for a new piece, Maazel suggested to Stucky that the composition be "something rhapsodic". Stucky later wrote, "I ran to the dictionary for help. The more I thought about the words rhapsody and rhapsodic—words I would never have chosen to describe my music—the more I realized that boundaries are meant to be pushed, and that an external, even foreign stimulus like 'rhapsodic' could be just the ticket to push mine." Stucky further described the composition in the score program notes, writing:

The resulting work is rhapsodic in two senses. It has a freely developing form, as if improvised, and it trades in ecstatic, fervent forms of expression. Although it is in one continuous movement, Rhapsodies is titled in the plural because it unrolls as a series of rhapsodic episodes, usually triggered by a single player whose ardent phrases gradually "infect" his neighbors until soon a whole section of the orchestra is sounding ecstatic. A solo flute (appassionato) draws other high woodwind voices in one by one, until they create a riotous mass of sound. A solo English horn (cantando, fervente) recruits clarinet, bass clarinet, bassoon, and more, until its whole neighborhood has broken into song, too. Solo horn and trumpet (nobile) launch still another outbreak, now among the brasses. Meanwhile, behind each of these episodes of rhapsodizing flows calmer, supporting music elsewhere in the orchestra, serving as a backdrop. Unrelenting fervor can only be borne for so long. Eventually, the orchestra lapses, spent, into a quiet coda, where the intense experiences that have come before can be recollected in tranquility.

== Reception ==
Reviewing the December 2011 Chicago premiere, music critic John von Rhein praised Rhapsodies for Orchestra, writing, "In a series of interlocking episodes, the solo flute, English horn, horn and trumpet found themselves echoed and mimicked by other instruments and groups. Swirls of orchestral color were infused with quirky rhythmic vitality. Van Zweden and the CSO brought the 10-minute piece to life most enjoyably." Katie Womack of the Dallas Observer similarly praised the piece at its Dallas premiere, commenting, "The dynamics of this piece range from intimate to bombastic and the juxtaposition of those extremes created some stunning sounds in the Meyerson. At only ten minutes, Stucky's Rhapsodies left me wanting more." Anthony Tommasini of The New York Times also lauded the work, remarking:

The piece begins with a crackling outburst of pungent chords before a fidgety solo flute initiates the first rhapsody. In one striking episode a piercing brass choir sets off a bevy of creeping chords and curious patterns of rising scales. Throughout this urgent, sometimes dizzying and continually surprising piece, there is an orchestral background of calmer sustained harmonies and undulant riffs. But the calmness is deceptive. Things are always stirring.

Jeffrey Gantz of The Boston Globe was more critical, describing the piece as "a series of ecstatic outbursts in which one instrument essays an idea and others take it up." Gantz added that it "worked out better in theory than in practice, though I liked the section in which the viola crooned over the orchestra’s 12-note ostinato." Likewise, Lawrence A. Johnson of the Chicago Classical Review called it "not one of Stucky’s more essential pieces" and noted that "Stucky’s debt to Witold Lutosławski [was] at times glaringly evident." Music critic Carla Rees similarly opined:

The concept of a rhapsody gave the work an element of freedom, with quasi-improvisatory material evolving in a chain-like development. This was a well crafted work, making use of a wide range of orchestral colours and creative orchestration. My only slight reservation was the overall conservatism of the musical language. There was little here to break down boundaries, and in that respect, this was a ‘safe’ commission which would not ruffle any feathers.
