= Jeu de timbres =

Jeu de timbres is a single-movement orchestral composition by the American composer Steven Stucky. The work was commissioned by the National Symphony Orchestra and completed in late 2003. It was premiered in January 2004, with the National Symphony Orchestra performing under conductor Leonard Slatkin.

== Composition ==
Jeu de timbres has a duration of roughly four minutes. It was originally commissioned by the National Symphony Orchestra as an encore piece for a 2004 French music festival. Therefore, Stucky drew inspiration for the piece from the music of such Impressionist composers as Claude Debussy and Maurice Ravel—even directly quoting an unspecified Ravel piece near the end of the composition. The title Jeu de timbres loosely translates from the French language to "play of colors" and is a regular French phrase for the keyboard glockenspiel, which is occasionally featured in the piece.

== Reception ==
Allan Kozinn of The New York Times praised the piece, describing it as "packed with shimmering string and woodwind textures yet with a changeability and bite that are among the most recognizable hallmarks of Mr. Stucky’s music." However, James Roy MacBean of Berkeley Daily Planet was slightly more critical, opining that it "jammed a vast variety of orchestral colors into too small a musical space to do anything noteworthy." Reviewing a 2014 performance with the San Francisco Symphony, music critic Kevin Chen remarked that the work "truly elicited a visual response, as [conductor] Valcuha and the orchestra brought almost a film-score atmosphere to the hall. Ultimately, the piece drew a few early standing ovations and whistles, and it was noted that the glockenspiel player in particular seemed to be having a lot of fun."
