= August 4, 1964 =

Oratorio by Steven Stucky

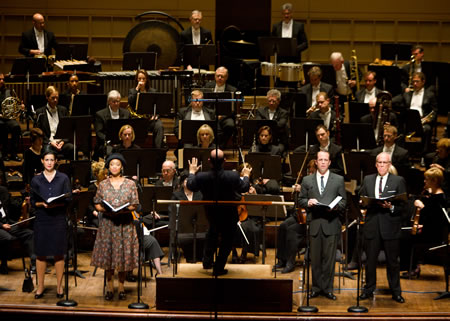
The Dallas Symphony Orchestra presenting the premiere of August 4, 1964.

August 4, 1964 is an oratorio for mezzo-soprano, soprano, tenor, baritone, choir, and orchestra written by the American composer Steven Stucky with a libretto by Gene Scheer. It was commissioned by the Dallas Symphony Orchestra in honor of the centennial of the birth of 36th U.S. President Lyndon B. Johnson. The piece premiered September 18, 2008, at the Morton H. Meyerson Symphony Center in Dallas, with conductor Jaap van Zweden leading mezzo-soprano Kelley O'Connor, soprano Laquita Mitchell, baritone Robert Orth, tenor Vale Rideout, the Dallas Symphony Chorus, and the Dallas Symphony Orchestra. The work specifically follows the events of August 4, 1964 during Johnson's presidency, including the Gulf of Tonkin incident and the discovered bodies of three murdered civil rights workers in Neshoba County, Mississippi.

The piece was nominated for the 2013 Grammy Award for Best Classical Contemporary Composition.

== Composition ==
Librettist Gene Scheer based the text of August 4, 1964 on various diaries, letters, news reports, and other historical documents regarding the day's events. The work explores its narrative from two perspectives: those of the grieving mothers of James Chaney and Andrew Goodman, and those of Johnson and Secretary of Defense Robert McNamara in the Oval Office. On the inspiration for the work, Stucky recalled:

I was 14 years old in 1964, at the time of these events. I was a junior high school student in Texas when John F. Kennedy was assassinated in Dallas in 1963 and it was only a year later that the incidents in Mississippi and Vietnam occurred. I felt very close to and conflicted about these events. When Gene sent me his idea for the opening of the libretto – in which the mothers of Chaney and Goodman sing “It was the saddest moment of my life: August 4, 1964, the day they found my son’s body” – I knew not only that I could compose this piece but that I had to!

The piece is scored for choir, orchestra, and four vocal soloists cast in historic roles:

- Mrs. Goodman, mezzo-soprano
- Mrs. Chaney, soprano
- President Lyndon B. Johnson, baritone
- Secretary of Defense Robert S. McNamara, tenor

=== Structure ===
A performance of August 4, 1964 lasts approximately 70 minutes. The work is composed in twelve movements:

1. The Saddest Moment
2. Historians
3. Oval Office 1
4. I Wish to Be a Part of that Fight
5. The Secret Heart of America
6. Oval Office 2
7. Elegy
8. Letter from Mississippi
9. Oval Office 3
10. August Fourth
11. Had We Known
12. What is Precious is Never to Forget

== Reception ==
Reviewing the world premiere of August 4, 1964, James R. Oestreich of The New York Times praised the piece as "a complex tribute to a complex man with a deeply divided legacy" and added, "Mr. Scheer created a tapestry of overlapping streams of consciousness, and Mr. Stucky responded with a varied, colorful and mercurial score." Alex Ross of The New Yorker said of the work, "In Stucky’s piece, formidable vocal and instrumental resources are marshalled to evoke, in a virtuosically eclectic style, the passions and flaws of a monumental figure." Paul Kirby of Theater Jones further elaborated:

Sheer's libretto includes poetry of Stephen Spender, as well as recollections from various historical sources. He presented the composer with certain problems: some sections based on historical records, while necessary to tell the story, were prosaic and dry (one is rarely called upon to set a presidential agenda or cabinet meeting to music). Stucky solved this problem brilliantly in several places (though not all) by creating overlapping statements by the soloists or by the chorus, which gave them the proper musical impetus. In another place, Sheer's juxtaposing of the ideas of the death of sons (in Mississippi and then immediately "so many sons" in Vietnam) was extremely effective.

Scott Cantrell of The Dallas Morning News was notably more critical. Despite calling Stucky "a master of orchestral writing," Cantrell ultimately described the vocal writing as "serviceable, but often stilted" and said of the work, "It’s a strange pièce d’occasion, and too expensive with the demanding solo and chorus parts to attract many other performances. The money and efforts might have gone to something promising more of an afterlife."
