= Symphony (Stucky) =

The Symphony by the American composer Steven Stucky is a four-movement symphony for orchestra. The work was jointly commissioned by the New York Philharmonic and the Los Angeles Philharmonic. It was composed from January through July 2012 and premiered September 28, 2012, at the Walt Disney Concert Hall in Los Angeles, with conductor Gustavo Dudamel leading the Los Angeles Philharmonic. The work had its New York City premiere November 29, 2012, with Alan Gilbert leading the New York Philharmonic.

== Composition ==
The symphony has a duration of approximately 20 minutes and is composed in four connected movements:

1. Introduction and Hymn
2. Outcry
3. Flying
4. Hymn and Reconciliation

Stucky had previously written four other symphonies, but has since withdrawn all of them, saying, "I wrote two when I was a little boy, and I have no idea what unholy mash-up those were. Then I wrote a symphony when I was a senior in college, and then one for my doctoral thesis, and I'm sure those have been completely expunged from the record." He therefore remarked "It was not sensible to call this piece Symphony No. 5" and elected to simply title the new work "Symphony." Stucky also described the piece as "old fashioned" and said, "It has recognizable themes which come back. That links it to the traditional form." The work is dedicated to the flutist Mimi Stillman.

== Reception ==
Reviewing the New York City premiere, Anthony Tommasini of The New York Times praised the accessibility of the Symphony and called it "a fairly modest piece, a 20-minute, colorfully orchestrated work in four parts, played without break." Despite giving the piece an overall positive review, Tommasini nevertheless opined, "Mr. Stucky perhaps achieved his goal of writing a graspable symphony too well. I was engrossed in the work right through, and Mr. Gilbert drew an exciting performance from the orchestra. But the music may give away its secrets too readily."
