= Spirit Voices =

Concerto by Steven Stucky

Spirit Voices is a concerto for percussion and orchestra in seven movements by the American composer Steven Stucky. The work was jointly commissioned by the Singapore Symphony Orchestra and the Aspen Music Festival for percussionist Evelyn Glennie. It was first performed by soloist Evelyn Glennie the Singapore Symphony Orchestra under conductor Lan Shui November 14, 2003.

== Composition ==
=== Structure ===
Spirit Voices has a duration of roughly 22 minutes and is composed in seven movements:

1. Jiu huang ye: Con forza
2. Bean nighe: Largo notturno
3. Ellyllon: Vivace
4. Te Mangoroa: Largo
5. Coyote: Energico
6. Tengu: Allegro di molto
7. Wah'Koh - Tah: Sereno, luminoso

=== Style and inspiration ===
Stucky described the meaning behind the title and the mythological inspiration for Spirit Voices in the score program notes. He wrote:

This work takes its inspiration from the diversity of spirits and other supernatural forces from cultures around the world who manifest their presence through sound. The Irish banshee (cousin to the Scots bean nighe of my second movement) is one well-known example, but there are countless others. However, Spirit Voices borrows only the names and general behaviors of the seven spirits and gods used for its seven movements; the music itself does not borrow from these original cultures but instead comes purely from my own imagination.

The seven movements are thus named after various mythological creatures from cultures around the world, including the Jiu huang ye (Malaysia), the Bean nighe (Scotland), the Ellyllon (Wales), Te Mangoroa (Māori), the Coyote (Navajo), the Tengu (Japan), and the Wah’Kon-Tah (various Native American traditions).

== Reception ==
Richard Whitehouse of Gramophone wrote, "Spirit Voices (2003) may open with a feisty solo cadenza but thereafter the relationship between percussion and orchestra is of the subtlest, with Stucky’s depiction of deities drawn from Oriental, Celtic and Amerindian cultures merging into a sequence as evocative as it is restrained." Andrew Druckenbrod of the Pittsburgh Post-Gazette called the piece "a remarkable percussion concerto" and added, "The powerful work concluded with a profound statement of the Native American Great Spirit treated perhaps the only way possible, with complete silence at the end. The audience, previously abounding with coughing, was rapt and no one uttered a sound for nearly a minute."

== Discography ==
A recording of Spirit Voices, performed by Evelyn Glennie and the Singapore Symphony Orchestra under conductor Lan Shui, was released April 27, 2010, through BIS Records and features Stucky's other orchestral works Pinturas de Tamayo and the Concerto for Orchestra No. 2.
