= Dreamwaltzes =

Dreamwaltzes is an orchestral composition by the American composer Steven Stucky. The work was commissioned by the Minnesota Orchestra for their annual Sommerfest series with support from the Jerome Foundation. The piece was completed in April 1986 and its world premiere was given by the Minnesota Orchestra under the direction of Leonard Slatkin on July 17, 1986. It is dedicated to the violinist Sonya Monosoff and Carl Pancaldo. The piece brought Stucky to prominence in the contemporary classical community and remains one of his most popular compositions.

== Composition ==
Dreamwaltzes is composed in a single movement and has a duration of approximately 15 minutes.

=== Background ===
Stucky described his initial inspiration for the piece in the score program notes, writing, "Since the management of the orchestra suggested that the new piece have some connection with the Viennese theme of the Sommerfest concerts, I found myself daydreaming about the waltz, and about Viennese composers like Schubert, Brahms, Mahler, and Berg, all of whom treated the waltz seriously in their music." He continued, "Dreamwaltzes is a public version of those daydreams: an orchestral fantasy of about fifteen minutes, based closely on fragments of real Viennese waltz music."

Dreamwaltzes quotes three such waltzes in successive episodes. The first waltz referenced is one of Johannes Brahms's Liebeslieder Waltzes, Op. 52, No. 8. The second waltz is one of Brahms's Sixteen Waltzes, Op. 39, No. 6. The third waltz is from Richard Strauss's comic opera Der Rosenkavalier. The composer wrote, "From time to time these originals float briefly to the surface. The three waltz episodes are surrounded by slower music forming an introduction, interludes, and a coda; this slower music, too, sometimes alludes to Rosenkavalier." Stucky continued:

But in Dreamwaltzes the past proves elusive; the waltz music is always slipping away almost as soon as it has begun. The point is clearest in the crucial third episode. Here, after a gradually evolving, accelerating development, the orchestra seems just on the point of reentering fully the late nineteenth century in some grand, unrestrained waltz music—when suddenly the whole affair collapses, and we are back in our own time. A composer in the late twentieth century can admire the waltz from a distance, but he cannot make it his own.

=== Instrumentation ===
The work is scored for an orchestra consisting of three flutes (2nd and 3rd doubling piccolo), three oboes (3rd doubling cor anglais), three clarinets (3rd doubling bass clarinet), two bassoons, contrabassoon, four horns, four trumpets, three trombones, tuba, timpani, three percussionists, piano (doubling celesta), harp, and strings.

== Reception ==
Dreamwaltzes has been praised by music critics. Reviewing the West Coast premiere by André Previn and the Los Angeles Philharmonic, Martin Bernheimer of the Los Angeles Times wrote, "Stucky stitched together some familiar hesitant phrases, a few instantly recognized fanfares, motivic fragments made quizzical by unfulfilled harmonic allusions. Sometimes the wittily quoted sources proved self-explanatory. Sometimes they remained coy about their identity. In any case, the 15-minute exercise emerged as a clever, affectionate collage that puts some old stylistic skeletons through provocative new paces." He added, "Dreamwaltzes left little doubt that past-tense creativity, when applied with craft and imagination, can be amusing as well as engaging." Mark Kanny of the Pittsburgh Tribune-Review similarly wrote, "It takes a familiar approach, seeing elements of old music through a modern lens. Fragments of waltzes by Johannes Brahms and Richard Strauss exist in a modern sound world. The old harmonies don't hold. The instrumentation has a modern edge in place of romantic plush."

John Rockwell of The New York Times was more critical of the piece, however, remarking, "Dreamwaltzes belongs to that already slightly tired notion of a look backwards from a modernist perspective - or, if you shuffle your categorical cards differently, a post-modernist perspective." Rockwell continued:

In this case, Mr. Stucky has taken three Vienna-linked waltzes by Brahms and Richard Strauss (oddly, both of them German, not Austrian) and allowed them to color and occasionally peer through a veil of more contemporary harmonic texture. The trouble is - even in comparison with other such works, like Jacob Druckman's Prism or, less familiarly, Pauline Oliveros's Bye Bye Butterfly - that the new material sounds anonymous and the older material remains too deeply buried. The best bit came at the end, as Mr. Stucky played with Strauss's anticipatory fragments before the final, dreamlike duet in Der Rosenkavalier.
