= The Stars and the Roses =

Three-movement composition

The Stars and the Roses is a three-movement composition for tenor solo and orchestra set to the poetry of Czesław Miłosz by the American composer Steven Stucky. The work was commissioned by the Berkeley Symphony, for which Stucky was then composer-in-residence. It was first performed on March 28, 2013 by the tenor Noah Stewart and the Berkeley Symphony under the conductor Joana Carneiro. The work was rewritten by Stucky in a chamber arrangement of the piece that premiered on October 18, 2013 by the Curtis 20/21 Contemporary Music Ensemble and tenor Roy Hage. The piece is dedicated to Stucky's wife Kristen.

== Composition ==
The Stars and the Roses has a duration of roughly 15 minutes and is composed in three movements:

1. Happiness
2. The Sun
3. The Bird Kingdom

=== Background ===
Stucky began composing a set of orchestral songs for the tenor Noah Stewart at the suggestion of the conductor Joana Carneiro, then music director of the Berkeley Symphony. Stucky chose to base the piece on three poems by Czesław Miłosz, writing in the score program notes, "I chose poems by Czesław Miłosz because I love his work, and because he was a Berkeley resident for many years." Stucky added:

Rather than the dark, melancholy poems of the war years, I gravitated toward lyrical texts expressing happiness and acceptance. These, it seemed to me, fit the medium of tenor with orchestra and the artistic personalities of Carneiro and Stewart. The first two texts call for a kind of tenderness and intimacy that strongly appealed to me, while "The Bird Kingdom" invited a brilliant, scherzo-like treatment.

== Reception ==
Reviewing the world premiere, Joshua Kosman of the San Francisco Chronicle called the piece "a short but lushly expressive suite of three orchestral songs" and wrote, "The Stars and the Roses needed no help in making its effect felt. With its poignant, resourceful orchestral writing and clarion text-setting, the piece illuminates Milosz's poetry (in English translation) in a subtle but evocative way." Jeff Dunn of the San Francisco Classical Voice similarly lauded, "The orchestration is the immediate strong point of the piece, but unlike the in-your-face symphony, Stucky's motivic content and progression may require repeated listenings for its subtleties to become manifest."

== Chamber Version ==
Stucky rewrote the piece in chamber arrangement for the Curtis 20/21 Contemporary Music Ensemble and the Curtis Composer-in-Residence Program, with funding from the Musical Fund Society. The work was premiered on October 18, 2013 by the Curtis 20/21 Contemporary Music Ensemble featuring Patrick Williams (flute), Slavko Popovic (clarinet), Shannon Lee (violin), Arlen Hlusko (cello), Kate Liu (piano), Ted Babcock (percussion) and tenor Roy Hage at Curtis Institute of Music with Stucky in attendance. The chamber version of the piece is scored for Flute, Clarinet in Bb, Percussion:, Vibraphone, Glockenspiel, Marimba (4 1/3 octaves), Bass Drum, Piano, Solo Tenor, Violin, Violoncello.
