= Siena Piano =

Italian piano

- Other names: Immortal Piano; Harp of King David
- Classification: Chordophone

Related instruments
- Piano, Fortepiano

Musicians
- Camille Saint-Saëns, Franz Liszt, Charles Rosen

The Siena Piano, also called the Immortal Piano and the Harp of King David, is a piano constructed at the beginning of the 19th century that became famous in the 1950s for its remarkable sound and its unusual history. Its timbre is similar to both a piano and a harpsichord. Legend has it that it was partially built with wood from the pillars of the Temple of Solomon, because of its excellent sound and it being the spiritual descendant of the Harp of David. Most critics say it is best for playing Mozart, Scarlatti and Debussy.

== History ==
In 1799, Sebastian Marchisio, a harpsichord maker in Turin, Italy began constructing the piano, but died before it was completed.

His family completed the first build and it was later given as a wedding gift to Marchisio's granddaughter. Several modifications later it appeared at the Paris World's Fair in 1867. It was then given as a wedding present by the city of Siena to the future king Umberto I of Italy, after which it fell into Nazi possession.

Following the defeat of the Germans by the British in the Battle of El Alamein, 1942, the British found the piano, all plastered up, in a desert in North Africa. It was then used by some British entertainers who toured camps and sang for the wounded. It found a home at a Tel Aviv piano workshop belonging to Avner Carmi Yanowsky by way of an Israeli merchant.

Carmi renovated the piano and he tried it out with several renowned musicians on tour in Israel. Pianist Pnina Salzman gave the first public recital of the Siena piano in Israel, a concert organized under the sponsorship of Prime Minister David Ben-Gurion, on the day of the declaration of Israel's independence. The piano then toured Europe finally finding its way to the United States, where it was shown at Steinway Hall and used for recordings. During this time the piano was extensively repaired again and again, the ancient crumbling sounding board giving way due to its age. During these times Sohmer Piano Company also decided to help Carmi with the repairs for over a year. Marie-Jose de Savoia, after listening to the piano, gave her patronage for the piano to be played at a concert for the United Nations International Year of the Child in Jerusalem.

Carmi and his wife wrote a book about the piano titled The Immortal Piano. His daughter finally sold it in 1996 to a private collector for $1 million. The most recent owner, who lived in the town of Caesarea, put the instrument up for auction in 2020.

=== From the notes of Gregor Benko ===
Avner Carmi had, in fact, achieved a near-legendary status among piano technicians and tuners in the New York area; this was for his amazing abilities in restoring and tuning pianos, if not for his tall tales. Carmi’s heart was in Israel, but he was a presence in New York City. At that time there was a huge, multi-story used piano store on Manhattan’s West 23rd Street named Brodwin Pianos. (At one time Carmi lived in the Chelsea Hotel, down the street from the piano store.) He bought the heavily carved, ornate upright piano from the store’s manager, the owner Harry Brodwin’s son-in-law, Hy Myerson, sometime in the 1940s. Myerson made no claims about Siena, Liszt, or anything else. It was a highly carved old piano, Italian style, and he sold old pianos all day, every day. Extravagantly carved old upright pianos with anachronistic decorations are not that rare—recently the “Neo-Zapotec” piano went on display in Los Angeles.

In secret, Carmi restored the piano, altering its sound but never allowing anyone to look inside. It was not known just how he achieved its unusual timbre, described by Harold Schonberg in a 1955 review as “… twangy—something like a harpsichord with deep lungs that can sustain a tone …” Specific details of his elaborate deception could become even more absurd when Carmi extolled its virtues in person. For the print media, for instance, he would tell of the “legends” that existed about the piano, stating that it was known as “La arpa de Re Davide (King David’s Harp)”—but in person he could be much less continent, confiding that the piano’s soundboard had embedded in it a sliver of wood that was, miraculously, an actual fragment of a pillar that was part of King Solomon’s temple. To one piano technician he further claimed that the wooden fragment had originally been part of the soundboard of King David’s harp. Carmi’s deception leaned heavily on a thick layer of fake Jewish lore, overlaid with an almost Catholic-like obsession with relics, perhaps similar to stories of fragments of the true cross. He set about promoting his false saga, approaching several pianists to become involved. By 1955 Charles Rosen had made a disc of Mozart and Scarlatti on the Siena piano, and further LPs were issued with pianists Grace Castagnetta, Kathryn Deguire, Anatole Kitain, and Marisa Regules. Ivan Davis (b. 1932) recorded this one selection on the piano about 1960.

== Problems with the "legend" ==
In an interview given in 2011 in Fanfare magazine, classical pianist Jerome Lowenthal described Avner and Hannah Carmi’s book The Immortal Piano as ghostwritten and as a mostly "fake story." Lowenthal is part of the Carmi family through his marriage to Avner Carmi’s niece, Ronit Amir, who was the daughter of Miriam Carmi, Avner's sister. Lowenthal confirms that Carmi was in the Jewish Brigade when he found the Siena piano, and the Siena piano is indeed the piano that had been given to then-Crown Prince Umberto. But Lowenthal states Avner Carmi was raised an orphan, making a complete fabrication of Carmi's story of a concert pianist grandfather who made it his lifelong quest to find the Siena piano. Lowenthal had himself played the Siena piano, and found it played "...like a Greek monster. The treble was very, very sweet and the bass had these long, pedal-like sounds, and the middle was a little bit like a harpsichord. It didn’t correspond to any historical instrument." Lowenthal further points out that since Carmi built everything in the piano except for the case, the sound has nothing to do with Siena or Jerusalem. The piano was rebuilt by Carmi in Queens, New York, where his obsession with it ruined his family's life, causing him to eventually leave his embittered family and return to Israel.

== Description ==
The Siena piano is an upright piano with dual pedals whose wood carvings are characteristic of early 19th century Italy. The finishing touches and decorations on the piano were put on by Sebastian Marchisio's great-grandson, one of Italy's most famous craftsmen at the time, Nicomedo Ferri and a cousin. They engraved laughing, dancing, playing cherubs and other designs such as harps, pipes, faces and lions. Portraits of Händel, Mozart, Aretino, Cherubini and Gluck were also made. The front face of the underbody has a bas-relief panel decorated with arabesques with a large laurel wreath in the middle of which is a harp of David surrounded by two griffins. On the lid the creators of the piano are written in Italian - Fratelli Marchisio, Turino and Bartalozzi e Ferri, Siena.

Lazare Lévy said of the piano after performing a recital with it, "This is the most astonishing piano I have come across. The works of Couperin and Scarlatti sound as if they had been written especially for the Siena piano. And playing Bach and Mozart is much more interesting than any other piano I've ever played on..." American conductor and radio host David Randolph agreed that the piano sounds like a harpsichord at times and at other times like a lute, harp or guitar. Brazilian composer Heitor Villa-Lobos said "I love the Immortal Piano, its sound and story equally". Artur Schnabel said this is the story of a "pianoman extraordinary, simply falling in love with the King's piano".

== Recordings ==
- The Siena Pianoforte, 1955, six sonatas by Scarlatti and two sonatas by Mozart performed by Charles Rosen, label Counterpoint/ Esoteric, Everest Records Production, CPT 3000/ 53000 (1958), Boston Skyline BSD 131 (1995).
- Bach on the Siena Pianoforte, 1956, five compositions by Bach including the Chaconne transcribed by Busoni, interpreted by Anatole Kitain, label Counterpoint/ Esoteric, Everest Records Production, CPT 53001.
- A Recital of Spanish music on the Siena pianoforte, 1955, compositions by Albéniz, Mompou, Turina and Villa-Lobos by Marisa Regules, label Counterpoint/ Esoteric, Everest Records Production, CPT 53002.
- The Siena Pianoforte, Mozart sonatas and variations on a Gluck theme by Kathryn Deguire, Counterpoint/ Esoteric label, Everest Records Production, CPT 53004.
- Christmas on the Siena Pianoforte, 1965, nineteen Christmas tunes including The Holly and the Ivy and Adeste Fideles interpreted by Grace Castagnella, label Counterpoint / Esoteric, Everest Records Production, CPT 53005.
