= The Classical Style (opera) =

Opera by Steven Stucky

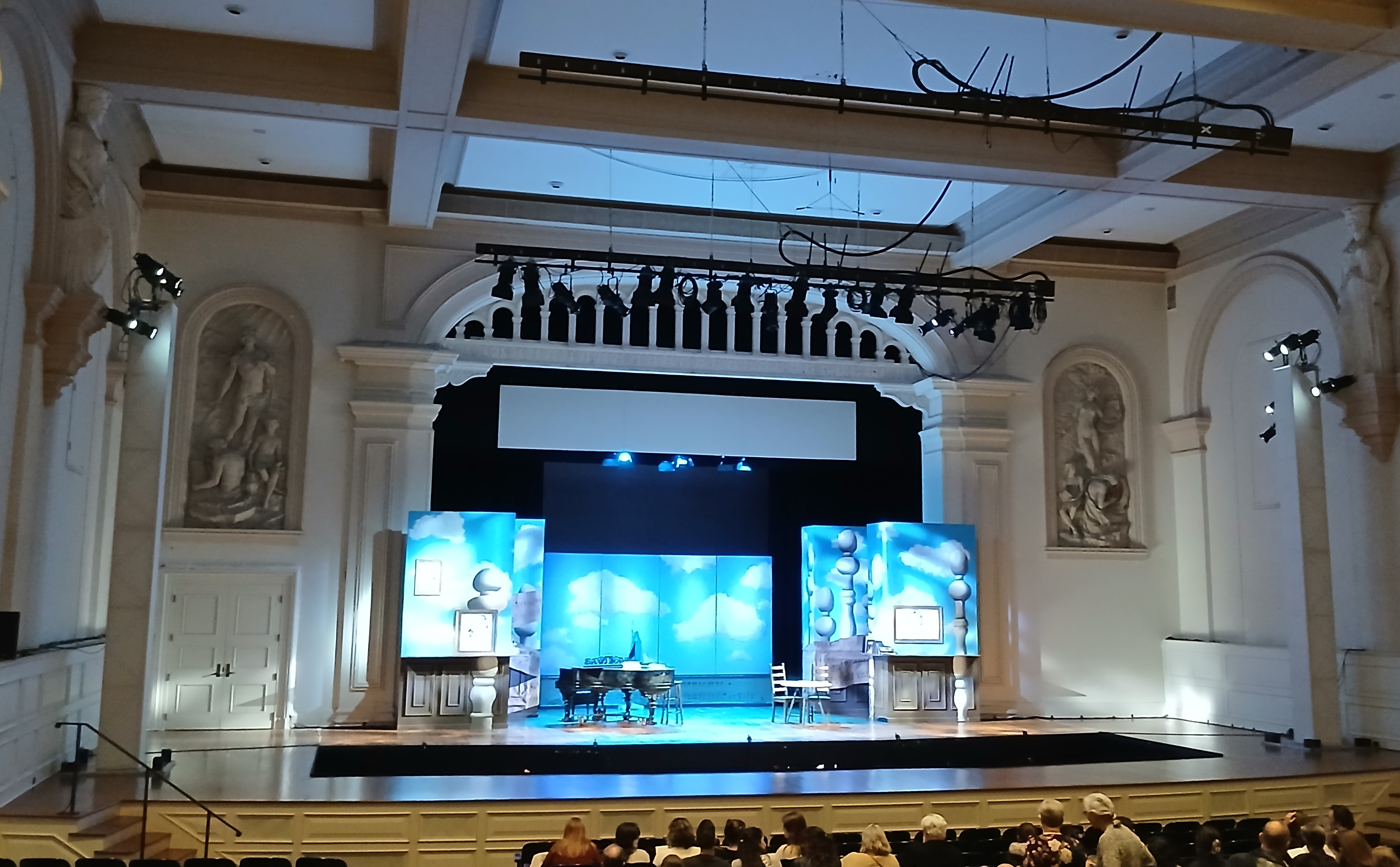
Set for a performance of The Classical Style at Peabody Institute in 2024

The Classical Style: An Opera (of Sorts) is an American comic opera in seven scenes, with music by Steven Stucky and libretto by Jeremy Denk. The opera was a joint commission from the Aspen Music Festival, Carnegie Hall, the Ojai Music Festival, and Ojai North!, and was premiered under the conductor Robert Spano on June 13, 2014 at the Ojai Music Festival in Ojai, California. The opera is inspired by the musicologist and pianist Charles Rosen's 1971 book The Classical Style and thus follows composers Wolfgang Amadeus Mozart, Joseph Haydn, and Ludwig van Beethoven as they descend from heaven into a modern-day classical music climate. The Classical Style was Stucky's last large-scale composition before his death in 2016.

== Background ==
Denk was a longtime friend of the pianist and author Charles Rosen, and had discussed the idea of adapting a comic opera from Rosen's celebrated book The Classical Style. Rosen died in December 2012 before the opera's completion, but had nevertheless given his blessing in time for Denk to proceed with the work.

On the inspiration to write a comic opera, Denk remarked:

Although those of us who perform and love this music like to cultivate an air of seriousness, at times we have to realize there is something ridiculous about the level to which we've subjected this music to consideration, analysis, thought. The opera buffa genre is simply a way of exposing this absurdity, turning music inside out to reflect on itself, with hopefully hilarious and intriguing results.

== Roles ==
Role	Voice type	World premiere cast, June 13, 2014 (Conductor: Robert Spano)
Joseph Haydn, Bartender	tenor	Dominic Armstrong
Wolfgang Amadeus Mozart, Donna Anna	soprano	Jennifer Zetlan
Ludwig van Beethoven, Commendatore	bass-baritone	Ashraf Sewailam
Tristan Chord, Charles Rosen	baritone	Kim Josephson
Henry Snibblesworth	tenor	Keith Jameson
Dominant, Musicologist	mezzo-soprano	Rachel Calloway
Tonic, Don Giovanni, Participant 2	bass-baritone	Aubrey Allicock
Subdominant, Participant 1, Robert Schumann	mezzo-soprano	Peabody Southwell

== Synopsis ==
The opera opens in heaven on the bickering Classical period composers Mozart, Haydn, and Beethoven. Observing present-day Earth, they are dismayed at the seeming decline of classical music and their growing irrelevance. After pulling Rosen's The Classical Style from a bookshelf at random, the three composers decide to descend to Earth to visit the author.

The trio crashes a symposium on sonata form in Manhattan where Rosen is to be speaking. There, a sniveling PhD candidate from the University of California, Berkeley named Henry Snibblesworth breaks the fourth wall of an opera within the opera as he stumbles into a performance of Mozart's Don Giovanni. Snibblesworth's protracted analysis of the music eventually causes Don Juan to lose his lust for Donna Anna and question what to do with his life, leading Snibblesworth to offer Don work (with limited benefits) at Berkeley.

Another subplot leads Mozart, Haydn, and Beethoven to a bar, where they meet the anthropomorphized chords Dominant, Tonic, Subdominant, and Tristan Chord.

The three composers finally meet the eloquent and inquisitive Rosen at his Manhattan apartment. Rather than encourage them of their stature in the face of fleeting relevance, Rosen kindly admonishes the composers, holding that all things must change and that no one can be relevant forever. They accept his response and return to heaven—disappointed, but understanding.

The opera ends with Rosen being visited by the composer Robert Schumann (also descended from heaven), who himself signaled a shift from the Classical era to the Romantic era of classical music.

== Instrumentation ==
The work is scored for an orchestra consisting of two flutes (doubling piccolos), two oboes, two clarinets, two bassoons, two horns, two trumpets, trombone, timpani, percussion, harpsichord (doubling piano and celesta), and strings.

== Reception ==
Reviewing the world premiere, Joshua Kosman of the San Francisco Chronicle lauded The Classical Style as an "exuberantly witty and often touching one-act opera" and wrote, "There has been plenty of musicology written about opera, the brilliant pianist and writer Jeremy Denk points out, but never an opera about musicology. Now he and composer Steven Stucky have rectified that oversight in glorious fashion." Mark Swed of the Los Angeles Times similarly called it an "illuminating, academic, occasionally combative, close study of the musical style of Mozart, Haydn and Beethoven by a brilliant pianist and scholar who died in 2012." Richard Scheinin of the San Jose Mercury News declared it a "winning little opera" and further described it as "gorgeous to hear, and filled with laughs." Reviewing the New York City premiere, Anthony Tommasini of The New York Times wrote, "It’s hard to say what the future holds for The Classical Style. But even those who lack understanding of the rudiments of harmony would surely enjoy it, while also learning something in the most entertaining way." Simon Williams of Opera News also praised the work, saying:

At times the performance veered close to the sophomoric humor of an end-of-year fraternity or sorority review, but it never arrived there. The opera is hugely entertaining, not least because Steven Stucky is a parodist of genius whose knowledge of the language of classical music over the past 250 years is astoundingly detailed and seemingly infinite. The majority of the score is based on the music of the Big Three, and Stucky was clearly most at ease and enjoying himself as he parodied Mozart.

Scott Timberg of Arts Journal was more critical, however, admonishing the work for possessing "an oddly anti-intellectual batch of bad puns and inside jokes" and called it "a missed opportunity." In July 2015 the Aspen Music Festival gave the first-ever complete staging of The Classical Style as part of a double bill with The Cows of Apollo by Christopher Theofanidis and William Hoffman.
