= Silent Spring (composition) =

2011 symphonic poem by Steven Stucky

Silent Spring is a 2011 symphonic poem for orchestra by the American composer Steven Stucky. The piece was written to commemorate the fiftieth anniversary of the environmental science book Silent Spring by Rachel Carson and was commissioned by the Pittsburgh Symphony Orchestra in collaboration with the Rachel Carson Institute at Chatham University. The work was premiered in Pittsburgh on February 17, 2012, with the Pittsburgh Symphony Orchestra conducted by Manfred Honeck.

== Composition ==
Though Silent Spring is composed in a single movement, Stucky fashioned the work into four sections named from Carson's works: "The Sea Around Us" (an eponymously titled book by Carson), "The Lost Woods" (the title of a letter written by Carson), "Rivers of Death" (a chapter title in Silent Spring), and "Silent Spring." Stucky intended these sections to "create an emotional journey from beginning to end without referring specifically to the scientific details."

In the program notes to the score, Stucky commented on the "at once 'abstract' and 'programmatic'" elements of the work, writing:

Rachel Carson's trenchant writing gave us data, marching orders, the heart to do what is right; but, like all great writing, it also gave us the spiritual and psychological space to contemplate our own thoughts about the world around us, about our own place in that world, about our own hopes and fears. Music cannot — should not attempt to — explain, preach, proselytize, comment on real life. Its domain is emotional life, not "real" life. It is non-specific, non-semantic, non-representational. My Silent Spring is the same: a space in which to contemplate one's own fears, hopes, and dreams.

== Reception ==
Reviewing the world premiere, Andrew Druckenbrod of the Pittsburgh Post-Gazette called Silent Spring "a brilliant, if unsettling, work" and declared, "Before I heard this work, which reflects the dire consequences the book outlines, I didn't realize how much I yearned for an instrumental meditation on the state of the environment." Mark Kanny of the Pittsburgh Tribune-Review also lauded the work, especially noting the performance by the Pittsburgh Symphony Orchestra. The New York Times's Allan Kozinn, reviewing the New York City premiere in Carnegie Hall, also praised the piece, writing, "Evoking Carson's argument for conservation in a musical score is a tall order. But Mr. Stucky, the Pittsburgh orchestra's composer in residence (...), typically draws on a vast timbral palette to create vivid textures. And with the title as a prompt, it is easy to hear what he had in mind in this explosive, shape-shifting 17-minute tone poem." Kozinn further remarked:

In his opening passages Mr. Stucky uses low-lying woodwinds and brasses to suggest a primordial soup from which a riot of activity gradually emerges. If the score, with its buzzing brass figures; slow-moving, melancholy string phrases; pillars of commanding, rich-hued chords; and chaotic, swirling woodwind lines had a visual analogue, it might be a Jackson Pollock painting. But just as you begin to think that this spring is anything but silent, Mr. Stucky strips away the brightest layers, and then the softer ones, leaving nothing but a repeating pianissimo bass tone. Mr. Honeck and his players seemed thoroughly comfortable with this complex work, and it would be hard to imagine a more thoughtful or virtuosic reading.
