= Concerto for Two Flutes and Orchestra =

Composition by Steven Stucky

The Concerto for Two Flutes and Orchestra is a composition for two flutes and orchestra by the American composer Steven Stucky. The work was commissioned by the Los Angeles Philharmonic, for which Stucky was formerly composer-in-residence and then New Music Adviser. The piece was composed from October through December 1994 and was given its world premiere in Los Angeles by the Los Angeles Philharmonic under the conductor Esa-Pekka Salonen on February 23, 1995.

== Composition ==
=== Structure ===
The concerto has a duration of roughly 20 minutes and is composed in three movements:

1. Elegy: Largo
2. Games: Allegro giocoso
3. Hymn: Adagio

=== Background ===
Stucky composed the concerto to feature the Los Angeles Philharmonic's principal flutists Janet Ferguson and Anne Diener Giles. In the score program notes, he wrote, "I was attracted not only by their superb artistry, but also by the appealing sonic possibilities of two flutes; most of the time in this concerto the soloists play together, forming a kind of super-flute that affords richer textural and expressive resources than any single instrument."

The first movement is an elegy for Stucky's friend and fellow composer Witold Lutosławski, who died a few months prior to the work's composition. Stucky described his intent, remarking, "the first movement is not so much an expression of grief as it is an homage to the beauty and greatness of spirit Lutoslawski's music embodies, and an attempt to honor him on his own terms by concentrating on the harmonic and melodic aspects of music that he held dear."

Conversely, Stucky described the second movement as "a scherzo in near-perpetual motion, whose materials (including lots of major and minor triads) are playful and sometimes quirky."

The final movement features two parallel musical lines: one emanating from the two soloists and the other coming from the orchestra. The composer further described the movement, writing:

The strings and horns play the "hymn": slow, serious, sustained, lyrical music that climbs during the course of the movement out of the depths of the double basses into the treble regions. At the same time, though, the solo flutes play another music entirely, a fast, capricious "descant" seemingly at odds with its sober surroundings. As the movement goes on, the soloists win more and more of the orchestra over to their livelier music, until by the end the hymn has disappeared entirely, absorbed into the joyful clamor of the descant.

He concluded, "Why 'Hymn'? Partly because the technical structure of the music has something in common with certain medieval church music, but mostly because it expresses hope and praise—inspired in my case not by religious feelings, but by the pleasure of spending my life making music and the privilege of collaborating with great musicians."

=== Instrumentation ===
The work is scored for two flutes and an orchestra consisting of two oboes (2nd doubling cor anglais), two clarinets (1st doubling E-flat clarinet; 2nd doubling bass clarinet), two bassoons, two horns, two trumpets, trombone, timpani, two or three percussionists, piano (doubling celesta), harp, and strings.

== Reception ==
Reviewing the world premiere, Timothy Mangan of the Los Angeles Times described the concerto as "an 18-minute work remarkable for elegant writing and a serious but altogether entertaining manner." He continued:

There is something appealingly immediate about those two flutes out front, plaintively echoing each other in the first movement, "Elegy" (for Lutoslawski); chasing each other around and flirting with the orchestra in the second movement, "Games," and splashing bright spots of color onto the somber, slow-moving canvas of the theme in "Hymn." The orchestra part is colorful--lots of washes and cascades--perhaps nothing startlingly new, but strongly outlined, purposeful.
