= Pinturas de Tamayo =

Composition by Steven Stucky

Pinturas de Tamayo (Pictures of Tamayo) is an orchestral composition in five movements by the American composer Steven Stucky. The work was commissioned by the Chicago Symphony Orchestra, who premiered the work on March 28, 1996, under the conductor Michael Gielen in Symphony Center, Chicago. The piece is inspired by the paintings of the Mexican artist Rufino Tamayo.

== Composition ==
=== Inspiration ===
Stucky recalled his first encounter with the works of the painter Rufino Tamayo in the score program notes, writing:

In April 1991 I visited the Rufino Tamayo Museum in Mexico City. I had never heard of Tamayo, but immediately I found myself drawn to his work, and I stood for a long while, transfixed by his painting La gran galaxia (The Great Galaxy). Indeed, that first encounter with his vibrant, mysterious, deeply human paintings is indelibly fixed in my memory as one of the great artistic experiences of my life.

He continued:

[Tamayo] died in June 1991, only two months after I first saw his work. Since then I have studied as many of his paintings and learned as much about him as I could, and when the Chicago Symphony invited me to write a new work for them, I decided to use the opportunity to pay homage to him in the only way I could, by making my own work of art.

=== Structure ===
The work has a duration of roughly 22 minutes and is composed in five movements named after Tamayo paintings:

1. Amigas de los pájaros (Friends of the Birds): Vivo
2. Anochecer (Sunset): Calmo
3. Mujeres alcanzando la luna (Women Reaching for the Moon): Moderato
4. Músicas dormidas (Sleeping Musicians): Adagio
5. La gran galaxia (The Great Galaxy): Tranquillo

== Reception ==
Reviewing the world premiere, John von Rhein of the Chicago Tribune felt that the work did not live up to Tamayo's art and wrote:

To translate visual into aural art is always a tricky business. Gunther Schuller managed it rather well with his Paul Klee studies but I can't say Stucky's work is anywhere near as compelling. Color reproductions of the five Tamayo paintings are on display in the Grainger Ballroom and, even though poorly reproduced, the comparisons are odious.

Mark Swed of the Los Angeles Times received the piece in a more positive light, however, writing, "Tamayo makes a visual splash, and Stucky responds with a colorful orchestral equivalent." Richard Whitehouse of Gramophone similarly remarked, "Pinturas de Tamayo (1995) draws on the more tangible imagery of Mexican artist Rufino Tamayo, but the music for the most part is hardly less understated – witness the luminous poise of 'Sunset' or the rapt introspection of 'The Great Galaxy' which makes for an unusually thoughtful apotheosis."

== Discography ==
A recording of Pinturas de Tamayo, performed by Evelyn Glennie and the Singapore Symphony Orchestra under the conductor Lan Shui, was released April 27, 2010, through BIS Records and features Stucky's other orchestral works Spirit Voices and the Concerto for Orchestra No. 2.
