= Radical Light =

Radical Light is a single-movement orchestral composition by the American composer Steven Stucky. The work was commissioned by the Los Angeles Philharmonic with contributions from Lenore and Bernard Greenberg. It was premiered October 18, 2007, at the Walt Disney Concert Hall in Los Angeles, with conductor Esa-Pekka Salonen leading the Los Angeles Philharmonic. The title of the piece comes from the poem "He Held Radical Light" by A. R. Ammons.

== Composition ==
Stucky drew inspiration from the music of Jean Sibelius—specifically his Fourth and Seventh symphonies, beside which Radical Light was to be first performed. Stucky wrote of this influence in the score program notes:

Sibelius has been a strong influence on me for many years, and I especially admire his Seventh Symphony as an architectural marvel. Having long wanted to attempt something like that myself, in Radical Light I tried to emulate something about the architecture of that peerless masterpiece: a single span embracing many different tempi and musical characters, but nevertheless letting everything flow seamlessly from one moment to the next - no section breaks or disruptions, no sharp turns or border crossings.

Despite this, Stucky nevertheless remarked that "the actual sound of the music has nothing to do with Sibelius". The work is dedicated to cellist Elinor Frey.

== Reception ==
Lisa Hirsch of the San Francisco Classical Voice lauded the work and noted the influence of Sibelius, remarking, "Stucky says that the direct influence is the structure of the one-movement Seventh Symphony. Radical Light is considerably shorter than that work, but builds organically to a spectacular climax of blazing brass and mad string figuration." Joshua Kosman of the San Francisco Chronicle similarly praised the piece as "encompass[ing] a wealth of moods and orchestral colors" and wrote:

What proved most striking here was the composer's command of harmony, and particularly the way the piece moves deftly in and out of the world of traditional tonality. The densely packed string textures of the opening - more notable for their chilly coloration than any harmonic content - suddenly resolve, in a bit of harmonic legerdemain, to a dark minor chord. The rest of the piece, though shorter and less profusely packed than the Sibelius, works on a similar model. Episodes arrive and vanish again, with formal breaks assiduously blurred, and the result has an almost dream-like logic to it.
