= The Romantic Generation =

Non-fiction book by Charles Rosen

- Author: Charles Rosen
- Genre: Music
- Publication date: 1998

The Romantic Generation is a 1995 non-fiction book by Charles Rosen. In 2011, The Guardian included The Romantic Generation on their list of the 100 greatest non-fiction books.
