= Son et lumière (composition) =

Son et lumière is a symphonic poem by the American composer Steven Stucky. It was commissioned by the Baltimore Symphony Orchestra and composed between June and December 1988. The work was premiered in Baltimore by the Baltimore Symphony Orchestra under conductor David Zinman, May 18, 1989.

== Composition ==
Son et lumière has a duration of roughly 9 minutes. The title translates to "sound and light", which is taken from the eponymous form of nighttime entertainment performed at tourist attractions. In the program notes to the score, Stucky said he "intended [the piece] as an orchestral entertainment whose subject is the play of colors, bright surfaces, and shimmery textures." Stucky further commented on the style of the work, writing:

I tried in this music to recapture the elan and immediacy that regular meters and repetitive rhythms make possible—the sort of thing forbidden during the modernist regime but later restored in the "minimalist" work of composers like John Adams, Steve Reich, and many others. Throughout its brief nine minutes, therefore, the piece is built almost exclusively of short, busy ostinato figures—my attempt, I suppose, to achieve the rhythmic vitality of minimalism, but without giving in to the over-simple harmonic language that sometimes comes with it.

The structure of the piece also roughly follows the sonata form predominantly used in the Classical period of classical music.

== Reception ==
Reviewing the Los Angeles premiere of Son et lumière with André Previn and the Los Angeles Philharmonic, Daniel Cariaga of the Los Angeles Times wrote, "this colorful musical canvas produces fascinating and exotic, and mostly tonal, sounds in imaginative combinations. It is quite attractive, consistently engaging. Written last year for the Baltimore Symphony, the brief tone-poem--one about colors, not emotions--ought to reach and entertain many listeners. It certainly seemed to do that for those at the Music Center Wednesday night." Allan Kozinn of The New York Times also praised the piece, writing, "though only nine minutes long, [it] draws expansively on an orchestra’s resources, particularly its brasses and percussion (though the strings and woodwinds come into their own late in the piece). Minimalist ostinatos propel the piece, but Mr. Stucky has so much going on, in so many layers and usually at contrasting tempos, that his use of repetition seems a secondary concern." Music critic Peter Burwasser called the work "bright" and "propulsive" and said, "Stucky has a Gallic, almost palpable feel for the sonic character of music, even at the expense of narrative shape."
