= Volker Banfield =

German pianist

Volker Banfield (born 9 May 1944, Oberaudorf, Bavaria) is a German classical pianist.

He studied at the Nordwestdeutsche Musikakademie in Detmold, beginning at age 14. Afterward he moved to the United States and studied at the Juilliard School (with Adele Marcus) and at the University of Texas (with Leonard Shure). He then returned to live in Germany and toured extensively. His repertory emphasized late 19th century and 20th century music featuring works by Bartók, Debussy, Messiaen, Prokofiev, Rachmaninoff, and Scriabin. The contemporary composers György Ligeti and Detlev Müller-Siemens have dedicated works to him. He has also become identified with the works of Schumann. He held a professorship at the Hochschule für Musik und Theater Hamburg until 2009.

He recorded four CDs for Wergo, and additional albums for CPO, including a performance of Ferruccio Busoni's Piano Concerto together with the Bavarian Radio Symphony Orchestra which was awarded a Diapason d'Or, and the world-premiere recording of Hans Pfitzner's Piano Concerto.
