= Baltimore Symphony Orchestra =

Symphony orchestra based in Baltimore, Maryland

- Short name: BSO
- Founded: 1916
- Concert hall: Joseph Meyerhoff Symphony Hall
- Music director: Jonathon Heyward
- Website: www.bsomusic.org

The Baltimore Symphony Orchestra (BSO) is an American symphony orchestra based in Baltimore, Maryland. The Baltimore SO has its principal residence at the Joseph Meyerhoff Symphony Hall, where it performs more than 130 concerts a year. In 2005, it began regular performances at the Music Center at Strathmore in Bethesda.

The orchestra's current music director is Jonathon Heyward, since 2023. Marin Alsop, music director from 2007 to 2021, is currently the orchestra's music director laureate.

== History ==
Founded in 1916, the Baltimore SO is the only major American orchestra originally established as a branch of the municipal government. Reorganized as a private institution in 1942, it maintains close relationships with the governments and communities of the city and surrounding counties, as well as with the State of Maryland.

The Baltimore SO's modern history dates from 1965, when Baltimore arts patron Joseph Meyerhoff became president of the orchestra, a position he held for 18 years. Meyerhoff appointed Romanian-born conductor Sergiu Comissiona as music director. He was followed by David Zinman from 1985 to 1998, then Yuri Temirkanov from 2000 to 2006, then Alsop and now Heyward.

In September 2007, Alsop became the 12th music director of the Baltimore SO, having served as music director-designate for the 2006–2007 concert season. The 2005 announcement of her appointment caused controversy, over reports that the orchestra players stated that they had not had enough voice in the search process. The orchestra and Alsop met after the announcement and smoothed over some of their differences. Alsop's contract was subsequently extended in 2009 and in 2013. In February 2020, the Baltimore SO announced that Alsop would conclude her music directorship of the orchestra at the close of the 2020–2021 season, and subsequently to take the title of music director laureate.

In 2016, the Baltimore SO appointed Tonya McBride Robles as vice president and general manager. In February 2017, Peter T. Kjome became president and chief executive officer of the orchestra. During the summer of 2019, the orchestra musicians were locked out, where the labor problems under discussion included the continuing status of the orchestra as a 52-weeks-per-year ensemble. In September 2020, the most recent contract agreement between management and musicians affirmed the 52-weeks-per-year status of the musicians, with pay reductions in the wake of financial losses partly related to the COVID-19 pandemic. In April 2021, the orchestra announced that Kjome is to stand down as its president and CEO after the close of his contract in January 2022. In April 2022, the orchestra announced the appointment of Mark C. Hanson as its next president and chief executive officer, effective 21 April 2022.

In November 2020, the orchestra announced the appointment of James Conlon as its artistic advisor, effective with the 2021–2022 season, for a period of three seasons, an unusual appointment in that Conlon had not conducted the orchestra prior to this announcement. Conlon conducted his first concert with the orchestra in October 2021. The orchestra's current additional conducting staff is as follows:

- Jack Everly: principal pops conductor
- Jonathan Rush: assistant conductor
- Wordsmith: artistic partner

In March 2022, Jonathon Heyward first guest-conducted the orchestra. He returned as guest conductor in April 2022 for a charity concert for Ukraine. In July 2022, the orchestra announced the appointment of Heyward as its next music director, effective with the 2023–2024 season, with an initial contract of 5 years. Heyward is the first conductor of color to be named music director of the Baltimore Symphony Orchestra. In October 2025, the orchestra announced the extension of Heyward's contract as music director through the 2030–2031 season.

== Concert halls/performance venues ==
=== Joseph Meyerhoff Symphony Hall ===
The Joseph Meyerhoff Symphony Hall has been the home of the Baltimore SO since its opening on September 16, 1982. Named for businessman and philanthropist Joseph Meyerhoff, the 2,443-seat hall has undergone renovations in 1990 and again in 2001.

=== The Music Center at Strathmore ===
The orchestra's second home is the 1,976-seat Music Center at Strathmore, located in North Bethesda, Maryland. With the opening of the Music Center at Strathmore in February 2005, the Baltimore Symphony became the nation's first orchestra with year-round venues in two metropolitan areas. As the founding partner and resident orchestra of the Music Center, the Baltimore SO presents 35 performances in the concert hall annually.

In addition to its Baltimore and Strathmore residencies, the orchestra regularly performs in Frederick, its longest continuing run-out concert series, as well as at Chesapeake College in Wye Mills.

== Notable premieres ==
The Baltimore Symphony Orchestra has commissioned several works from American composers, which include:

- Christopher Rouse: Symphony No. 1 (1988)
- Steven Stucky: Son et lumière (1989)
- Stephen Albert: Cello Concerto (1990)
- John Harbison: Symphony No. 3 (1990)
- Philip Glass: Overture for 2012 (2012)
- John Adams: Saxophone Concerto (2013)
- Jonathan Leshnoff: Guitar Concerto, written for guitarist Manuel Barrueco (2014)

== Performances/tours ==
In 1987, the Baltimore SO and its then-music director David Zinman undertook a concert tour of Europe and the Soviet Union. The Baltimore SO was the first American orchestra in 11 years to tour the Soviet Union after cultural relations resumed towards the end of the Soviet war in Afghanistan. Under Zinman the orchestra made its first visits to Chicago and the Midwestern United States in 1990 and to East Asia] in 1994, with subsequent East Asia tours in 1997 and 2002. The Baltimore SO has often appeared at Carnegie Hall, including a February 2008 concert with the New York premiere of Steven Mackey's percussion concerto Time Release with soloist Colin Currie.

== Community outreach ==
The Baltimore SO performs approximately 30 education concerts and open rehearsals each year for more than 60,000 area students in pre-school through 12th grade. Cornerstone initiatives include 'BSO on the Go', a program that brings small groups of Baltimore SO musicians into schools for interactive music education workshops at no cost to the schools, and 'Side-by-Side' concerts, which allow student musicians to rehearse and perform a full-length concert alongside Baltimore SO musicians. Rusty Musicians, a program geared towards adult amateur musicians, allows participants to join the Baltimore SO and perform under its conductor.

=== OrchKids ===
In May 2008, the Baltimore SO began OrchKids, an after-school program to provide music experience and education for youth in Baltimore City's low-income neighborhoods. In collaboration with community partners, it provides music education, instruments, meals and mentorship at no cost to the participants. OrchKids serves more than 400 students from pre-K through fifth grade at Lockerman Bundy Elementary School, New Song Academy, Mary Ann Winterling Elementary School and Highlandtown Elementary/Middle School. OrchKids maintains a faculty of 27 professional working/teaching musicians and academy classroom teachers. Business and community partners include Baltimore City Public Schools, The Peabody Institute, Baltimore School for the Arts, The Family League of Baltimore, University of Maryland Baltimore County and others. Lead funding support was provided by initial gifts of $100,000 from Marin Alsop and $1,000,000 from Rheda Becker and Robert Meyerhoff.

=== BSO Academy ===
The BSO Academy is an annual intensive week-long study program that helps amateur musicians improve the skills through learning and performance with the BSO and its conductor. The Andrew W. Mellon Foundation has provided leadership support for the BSO Academy since 2012.

=== Rusty Musicians ===
Geared towards adult amateur musicians, 'Rusty Musicians with the BSO' is a programme where for one evening, amateur musicians are invited to join members of the Baltimore SO on stage to rehearse and perform selected repertoire led by Marin Alsop. The first 'Rusty Musicians' event was at Strathmore in February 2010, with more than 400 amateur musicians participating. The program was repeated at Joseph Meyerhoff Symphony Hall in September 2010 with nearly 300 adult amateur participants.

=== Youth Orchestra ===
The Baltimore Symphony Youth Orchestras (BSYO), formerly known as the Greater Baltimore Youth Orchestra, came under the umbrella of the Baltimore Symphony Orchestra in 2012. It is made up of five different ensembles, categorized by age group and experience:

- The youth orchestra (YO) is a pre-professional, full orchestra with students typically being of high school age, and it is the most advanced of the four ensembles. It is conducted by Christopher Cicconi.
- The concert orchestra (CO) is a full orchestra for students that are typically of high school age. It is conducted by James Woomert.
- The Philharmonia Orchestra (PO) is a full orchestra for high school and middle school aged students. It was founded in 2024 due to a large number of applicants that year. It is conducted by Liam Cunningham.
- The Repertory Orchestra (RO) is a string ensemble established in 2026. It is conducted by Wesley Thompson.
- The String Orchestra (SO) is an orchestra made up of only string instruments. It is conducted by Wesley Thompson.

==== Applications and auditions ====
Applications to join are opened in March and due in May preceding the upcoming season. The application includes an audition video, which must include a spoken introduction including the applicant's name, instrument, intended ensemble, and what grade the applicant will be in the upcoming fall. This introduction is followed by a solo piece of the applicant's choice and three excerpts provided by the BSYO. Audition videos for percussionists must include a mallet solo and a snare solo, followed by a set of excerpts provided by the BSYO.

==== Rehearsal and performances ====
One season of BSYO lasts from September through May, with three concerts being held in November, March, and May. The BSYO performs at the Joseph Meyerhoff Symphony Hall and, until 2022, at the George Washington Carver Center for Arts and Technology. All five ensembles rehearse on Sundays at different times: the YO from 1:00 to 4:00 pm, the CO from 4:30 to 7:00 pm, the PO from 1:15 to 3:15 pm, the RO from 12:30 to 2:30 pm, and the SO from 3:00 to 4:30 pm, all in Eastern Standard Time.

==== Concerto Competition ====
In each season of the BSYO, an annual Concerto Competition is held for all five orchestras. The winner from each ensemble is invited to perform as a soloist with their respective group on one of the scheduled concerts, usually the third and final concert of the season.

== Broadcasts ==
- XM Satellite Radio: Hosted by XM Classics 110 program director Martin Goldsmith, each program features a full-length BSO concert conducted by Marin Alsop, as well as behind-the-scenes interviews with Alsop and guest artists.
- iTunes Clueless About Classical: Hosted by Marin Alsop, these podcasts take novice listeners behind-the-scenes with the BSO, exploring repertoire, composers, musical concepts and orchestra life.
- NPR's Performance Today: Concerts broadcast across the U.S.
- American Public Media's SymphonyCast: Concerts broadcast across the U.S.

== Recordings ==
- 1962: J.S. Bach: Brandenburg Concerto No. 5 in D; Glenn Gould, pianist. Private recording of a public performance. (Denon/Nippon Columbia, 1989)
- 1978: Pettersson: Symphony No. 8 (Polar)(also released by Deutsche Grammophon 1980)
- 1980: Respighi: Feste Romane; Pini di Roma (Vanguard)
- 1981: Saint-Saëns: Symphony No. 3 in C minor, "Organ" (Silverline)
- 1982: Ravel: Alborada del gracioso; Rapsodie espagnole; Concerto in Piano Left Hand in D major, Leon Fleisher, piano (Vanguard)
- 1984: Brahms (orchestrated/Schoenberg): Quartet for Piano Vox and Strings No. 1, op. 25, Vox
- 1988: Berlioz: Overture to Benvenuto Cellini, op. 23; "Love Scene" from Roméo et Juliette; "Minuet of the Will-o'-the-Wisps" from The Damnation of Faust; "Dance of the Sylphs" from The Damnation of Faust; "Rakóczy March" from The Damnation of Faust; Le Corsaire Overture; "Trojan March" from Les Troyens; "Royal Hunt and Storm" from Les Troyens, Sylvia McNair, soprano; Richard Leech, tenor; Boys from the Choir of St. Michael and All Angels; Boys from the Choir of St. David's Episcopal Church; Baltimore Symphony Chorus (Telarc)
- 1989: Elgar: Cockaigne; Variations on an Original Theme, op. 36; "Enigma Variations", Serenade for Strings; Salut d'amour; "Love's Greeting" (Telarc)
- 1989++: Barber: Concerto for Cello and Orchestra; Britten: Symphony for Cello and Orchestra, Yo-Yo Ma, cello (Sony Classical)
- 1990: Tchaikovsky: Concerto No. 1 for Piano and Orchestra Rachmaninoff: Rhapsody on a Theme of Paganini, Horacio Gutiérrez, piano (Telarc)
- 1990: Tchaikovsky: Symphony No. 4; Romeo and Juliet Overture-Fantasy (Telarc)
- 1990: Schumann: Symphony No. 1, "Spring", Symphony No. 4 (Telarc)
- 1991: Stravinsky: The Firebird Suite (1919 version); Petrushka (1947 version); Fireworks (Telarc)
- 1991: Michael Torke: Green; Purple; Ecstatic Orange; Ash; Bright Blue Music (Argo/London)
- 1991: Berlioz: Roman Carnival Overture; Les Francs-Juges Overture; Symphonie fantastique (Telarc)
- 1991: Schumann: Symphony No. 2; Symphony No. 3 ("Rhenish") (Telarc)
- 1991: Britten: Diversions for Piano Left Hand and Orchestra; Laderman: Concerto for Orchestra, Leon Fleisher, piano (Phoenix USA)
- 1992: Rachmaninoff: Symphony No. 2; "Vocalise"; Sylvia McNair, soprano (Telarc)
- 1992: Barber: Adagio for Strings; Overture to The School for Scandal; First Essay for Orchestra; Music for a Scene from Shelley; Second Essay for Orchestra; Symphony No. 1 (Argo/London),
- 1992: Elgar: Symphony No. 1; Pomp and Circumstance Military Marches Nos. 1 and 2 (Telarc)
- 1992: Christopher Rouse: Symphony No. 1; Phantasmata (Nonesuch)
- 1994: Rachmaninoff: Symphony No. 3; Symphonic Dances (Telarc)
- 1994: Copland: Rodeo; El salón México; Danzón Cubano; Billy the Kid (Argo/London)
- 1994+: Albert: Concerto for Cello and Orchestra; Bartók: Concerto for Viola and Orchestra; Bloch: Hebraic Rhapsody for Cello and Orchestra, "Schelomo", Yo-Yo Ma, cello (Sony Classical)
- 1995: Glinka: Overture to Russlan and Ludmilla; Ippolitov-Ivanov: Caucasian Sketches; Rimsky-Korsakov: Russian Easter Overture; Tchaikovsky: Francesca da Rimini; "Polonaise" from Eugene Onegin, (Telarc)
- 1995: Bernstein: "Mambo" from West Side Story; John Adams – The Chairman Dances; Aaron Jay Kernis – New Era Dance; David Schiff – Stomp; Libby Larsen – Collage-Boogie; John Harbison – Remembering Gatsby; Michael Torke – Charcoal; Robert Moran – Points of Departure; Dominick Argento – "Tango" from The Dream of Valentin; Michael Daugherty – Desi; Christopher Rouse – Bonham (Decca)
- 1996: Michael Daugherty: Metropolis Symphony, Bizarro (Argo/London)
- 1997: Gershwin: Concerto in F; Ravel: Piano Concerto in G major, Hélène Grimaud, piano (Erato Records)
- 1997***: Barber: Violin Concerto; Bloch: Baal Shem; Walton: Violin Concerto, Joshua Bell, violin (Argo/London)
- 1997: Bernstein: Candide overture, "Symphonic Dances" from West Side Story; Fancy Free, Facsimile (Argo/London)
- 1998: John Tavener: The Protecting Veil; Wake Up...and Die, Yo-Yo Ma, cello (Sony Classical)
- 1999**: Beethoven: Concerto for Violin and Orchestra in D major, Op. 61; Serenade for Solo Violin, Strings, Harp and Percussion, Hilary Hahn, violin (Sony Classical)
- 2000: Adolphus Hailstork: Intrada; Done Made My Vow; An American Fanfare; I Will Lift Up Mine Eyes (NPR /BSO)
- 2004: Ives: 'They are there!'; Three Places in New England; Holidays, Baltimore Symphony Chorus (Decca)
- 2007: Stravinsky: The Rite of Spring (iTunes)
- 2007: John Corigliano: Concerto for Violin and Orchestra, The Red Violin, Joshua Bell, violin (Sony Classical)
- 2008: Dvořák: Symphony No. 9 in E minor, From the New World; Symphonic Variations (Naxos)
- 2009*: Bernstein: Mass: A Theatre Piece for Singers, Players and Dancers (Naxos)
- 2009: Mark O'Connor: Americana Symphony; Variations on Appalachia Waltz (OMAC Records)
- 2010: Dvořák: Symphony No. 6 in D major; Nocturne in B major, Scherzo capriccioso (Naxos)
- 2010: Dvořák's Symphony No. 7 in D minor; Symphony No. 8 in G major (Naxos)
- 2010: Gershwin: Rhapsody in Blue; Concerto in F major, Jean-Yves Thibaudet, piano (Decca)
- 2012: Bartók: Music for Strings, Percussion and Celesta; Concerto for Orchestra (Naxos)
- 2012: Mahler: Symphony No. 1, Titan (Naxos)
- 2017: Prokofiev: Romeo and Juliet (Naxos)

(*2010 Grammy Nominee) (**2000 Grammy Nominee) (***1998 Grammy Nominee) (+1995 Two-time Grammy Award Winner) (++1990 Grammy Award Winner)

== Music directors ==
- Gustav Strube (1917–1930)
- George Siemonn (1930–1935)
- Ernest Schelling (1935–1937)
- Werner Janssen (1937–1939)
- Howard Barlow (1939–1942)
- Reginald Stewart (1942–1952)
- Massimo Freccia (1952–1959)
- Peter Herman Adler (1959–1968)
- Sergiu Comissiona (1969–1984)
- David Zinman (1985–1998)
- Yuri Temirkanov (1999–2006)
- Marin Alsop (2007–2021)
- Jonathon Heyward (2023–present)

== Composer in residence ==
- 2026–2027 Jonathan Leshnoff
