= Concerto for Orchestra No. 2 (Stucky) =

2003 composition by Steven Stucky

The Second Concerto for Orchestra is a concerto for orchestra by the American composer Steven Stucky. The work was commissioned by the Los Angeles Philharmonic while Stucky was their composer-in-residence for the inaugural season of the Walt Disney Concert Hall. It was completed in 2003 and was first performed on March 12, 2004, with the conductor Esa-Pekka Salonen leading the Los Angeles Philharmonic. The piece was awarded the 2005 Pulitzer Prize for Music.

== Composition ==
=== Background ===
Stucky conceived the piece as a celebration of his musical influences. Thus, the work freely references passages from many previous classical works. In 2003, Stucky elaborated:

The first movement, for example, echoes a texture from the first movement of Ravel's Piano Concerto in G (the two-handed one), as well as Oliver Knussen's Flourish with Fireworks and in turn the piece Knussen himself was honoring, Stravinsky's Fireworks. Later in the movement, there are admiring glances at orchestral textures from two Sibelius works, En saga and the first movement of the Third Symphony. The second movement, too, has souvenirs from Debussy's La Mer, Brahms's E-flat clarinet (or viola) sonata, Stravinsky's Petrushka, and other works. The finale even borrows briefly from an earlier orchestral work of mine, Son et lumière. [...] What does this all mean for listeners and performers — for the "end users" of the piece? Surely not that they should approach my new concerto as if it were a treasure hunt or a music history lecture, straining to catch musical souvenirs as they go by. (A good way to ruin a concert!) Instead, I hope that knowing something about my private hopes and allegiances can help others feel the security and freedom to listen and play their very best.

Stucky also assigned letters of the alphabet to pitches in order to form a musical code in the first movement. He wrote that the first movement "enshrines essential personal loyalties, using musical code to refer to the Los Angeles Philharmonic, my musical home for almost sixteen years, and to many of the people most important to me there."

=== Structure ===
The Second Concerto for Orchestra has a duration of approximately twenty-five minutes and is composed in three movements:

1. Overture (with Friends)
2. Variations
3. Finale

=== Instrumentation ===
The work is scored for three flutes (second doubling alto flute, third doubling piccolo, three oboes (third doubling English horn), three clarinets (third doubling bass clarinet), two bassoons, contrabassoon, four French horns, four trumpets, three trombones, tuba, timpani, percussion (anvil, bass drum, bongo drums, chimes, Chinese cymbal, glockenspiel, large triangle, Latin cowbells, marimba, snare drum, suspended cymbals, tambourine, tamtam, tom-toms, vibraphone, wood blocks, xylophone, whip), harp, piano, celesta, and strings.

== Reception ==
Mark Swed of the Los Angeles Times called the concerto a "colorful, delight-bringing score" and praised the references to other classical works, commenting, "The strongest impression throughout the concerto — which has a richly expressive, exquisitely tinted variations movement in the center and a rollicking final movement — is of Stucky's sumptuous ease with the orchestra. He makes the transition from Ravel's sound world to Salonen's not only natural but fresh, the way new blooms always are. This is music of eternal springtime." Reviewing the premiere recording by Lan Shui and the Singapore Symphony Orchestra, Richard Whitehouse of Gramophone praised Stucky's "fastidious orchestral sense" and added, "those looking for contemporary music that is approachable but never facile will find undoubted rewards here."

== Discography ==
A recording of the Second Concerto for Orchestra performed by the National Orchestral Institute Philharmonic, conducted by David Alan Miller, was released June 2018 and was nominated for a Grammy Award in the field of "Best Orchestral Performance." An additional recording of the Second Concerto for Orchestra, performed by Evelyn Glennie and the Singapore Symphony Orchestra under conductor Lan Shui, was released April 27, 2010, through BIS Records and features Stucky's other orchestral works Spirit Voices and Pinturas de Tamayo.
