= The Golden Ticket (opera) =

2010 opera by Peter Ash

The Golden Ticket is an opera based on Roald Dahl's classic 1964 book Charlie and the Chocolate Factory by the contemporary American composer Peter Ash, with a libretto by Donald Sturrock. The Golden Ticket was commissioned by American Lyric Theater, Lawrence Edelson, Producing Artistic Director; and Felicity Dahl. It premiered at Opera Theatre of Saint Louis on June 13, 2010, in a co-production between OTSL, Ireland's Wexford Festival Opera, and American Lyric Theater.

== History ==
The Golden Ticket was originally conceived as a project for London's Royal National Theatre, but early workshops initiated by the composer and librettist revealed the challenges of producing an opera under the auspices of a theater company that did not regularly employ classically trained singers. An early concert version of the score was presented by the Manchester Camerata shortly thereafter. This concert was considered by most to be a failure, in part due to the fact that family audiences had expected a fully staged version of Charlie and the Chocolate Factory – not an opera in concert. After receiving funding from the National Endowment for Science, Technology and the Arts in the UK, Ash and Sturrock created a 25-minute recording of excerpts of the opera to promote it to potential producers. In 2006, this recording came to the attention of American Lyric Theater's Producing Artistic Director, Lawrence Edelson, who commissioned the completion of the opera in partnership with Felicity Dahl, widow of Roald Dahl. American Lyric Theater developed the opera over a three-year period, including two extensive workshops in New York City, prior to partnering with Opera Theatre of Saint Louis in 2010 for the world premiere production.

== Musical forces and language ==
The opera is written for a virtuoso chamber orchestra of 23 players, a cast of 12 principal singers, and a chorus of 24 adults with an optional children's chorus. No children's chorus was used in the World Premiere production.

== Role distribution ==
- Charlie Bucket: Treble
- Willy Wonka: Bass Baritone or Baritone
- Mike Teavee: Countertenor
- Veruca Salt: Mezzo Soprano
- Lord Salt: Baritone
- Violet Beauregarde: Coloratura Soprano
- Augustus Gloop: Tenor
- Grandpa Joe: Tenor
- Mr. Beauregarde/Grandpa George: Bass
- Mrs. Gloop/Grandma Georgina: Dramatic Soprano
- Mrs. Teavee/Grandma Josephine: Contralto or Mezzo Soprano
- Candy Mallow/Squirrelmistress: Mezzo Soprano

Chorus solos:

- Floor Manager
- Camera Man
- Herpes Trout
- Marvin Prune
- Miranda Grope
- Salt Worker
- Oompa Loompa

Chorus of gargoyles, townsfolk, Oompa Loompas, and squirrels

== World premiere ==
The World Premiere Production Team and Cast:

- Director: James Robinson
- Conductor: Timothy Redmond
- Scenic Design: Bruno Schwengl
- Costume Design: Martin Pakledinaz
- Choreographer: Seán Curran

A co-production between Opera Theatre of Saint Louis, American Lyric Theater, and Wexford Festival Opera.

- Charlie Bucket: Michael Kepler Meo
- Willy Wonka: Daniel Okulitch
- Mike Teavee: David Trudgen
- Veruca Salt : Jennifer Rivera
- Lord Salt: David Kravitz
- Violet Beauregarde: Tracy Dahl
- Augustus Gloop: Andrew Drost
- Grandpa Joe: Frank Kelley
- Mr. Beauregarde/Grandpa George: Oren Gradus
- Mrs. Gloop/Grandma Georgina: Kristin Clayton
- Mrs. Teavee/Grandma Josephine: Mary Ann McCormick
- Candy Mallow/Squirrelmistress: Jennifer Berkebile

== Subsequent productions ==
The world premiere production is a co-production between Opera Theatre of Saint Louis, American Lyric Theater and Wexford Festival Opera. Wexford has scheduled the European premiere for October 2010. American Lyric Theater is expected to announce additional production plans in late 2010. The Atlanta Opera's production of The Golden Ticket was performed in March 2012.

== Recording ==
The Atlanta Opera production was recorded in March 2012 with the following cast:

- Benjamin P. Wenzelberg – Charlie Bucket
- Daniel Okulitch – Willy Wonka/Mr. Know
- Kristin Clayton – Grandma Georgina/Mrs. Gloop
- Jamie Barton – Grandma Josephine/Mrs. Teavee
- Keith Jameson – Grandpa Joe
- Jason Hardy – Grandpa George/Mr. Beauregard
- Gerald Thompson – Mike Teavee
- Krista Costin – Candy Mallow/Squirrel Mistress
- Abigail Nims – Veruca Salt
- David Kravitz – Lord Salt
- Ashley Emerson – Violet Beauregard
- Andrew Drost – Augustus Gloop
- Gabriel Couret – Floor Manager
- Nathan Munson – Camera Man
- Michael Jones – Herpes Trout
- Lara Longworth – Mrs. Trout
- Chase Davidson – Marvin Prune
- Rebecca Shipley – Miranda Grope
- Megan Mashburn – Salt Worker
- Marc Porlier – Oompa Loompa

Chorus: Michael Arens, Kyle Barnes, Zachary Brown, C. Augustus Godbee, Zachary Heath, Brandon Odom, Stuart Schleuse, Beverly Blouin, Rebecca Blouin, Melissa Fontaine, Jennifer Hamilton, Brishelle Miller, Laura Porlier, Amanda Smolek, Elizabeth Stuk, Laurie Tossing, Michael Gaare, Grant Jones, Stephen McCool, Jason Royal, Iván Segovia

Orchestra: Peter Ciaschini, Helen Kim, William Johnston, Charae Krueger, Lyn DeRamus, James Zellers, Jeana Melilli, Kelly Bryant, David Philipsen, David Odom, John Warren, Jan Baker, Mike Muszynsji, David Bradley, Yvonne Toll, Hollie Lifshey, Jonathan Swygert, Mark McConnell, Richard Brady, Donald Strand, Michael Cebulski, Jeff Kershner, John Lawless, Susan Brady, Michael Spassov

Conductor: Peter Ash

Chorus Master: Walter Huff

Albany Records TROY 1381/2
