= Steven Stucky =

American composer (1949–2016)

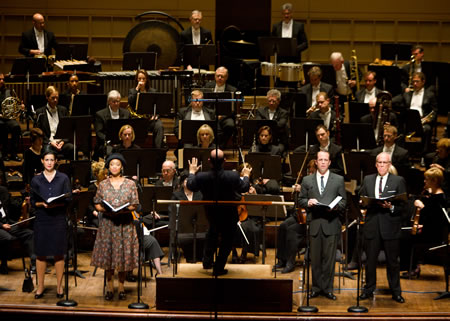
The Dallas Symphony Orchestra presenting the premiere of Steven Stucky's oratorio, August 4, 1964

Steven Edward Stucky (November 7, 1949 − February 14, 2016) was a Pulitzer Prize-winning American composer.

== Life and career ==
Steven Stucky was born in Hutchinson, Kansas. At age 9, he moved with his family to Abilene, Texas, where, as a teenager, he studied music in the public schools and, privately, viola with Herbert Preston, conducting with Leo Scheer, and composition with Macon Sumerlin. At Baylor University, he studied composition with Richard Willis, and conducting with Daniel Sternberg.

He studied composition with Karel Husa at Cornell. Stucky wrote commissioned works for many of the major American orchestras, including Baltimore, Chicago, Cincinnati, Dallas, Los Angeles, New York, Minnesota, Philadelphia, Pittsburgh, St. Louis, and St. Paul.

Steven Stucky was long associated with the Los Angeles Philharmonic, where he was resident composer 1988–2009 (the longest such affiliation in American orchestral history); he was host of the New York Philharmonic's Hear & Now series 2005–09; and he was Pittsburgh Symphony Composer of the Year for the 2011–12 season. For Pittsburgh, he composed Silent Spring, in honor of the 50th anniversary of Rachel Carson's epochal book of the same title. He teamed with the celebrated pianist and author Jeremy Denk to create his first opera, The Classical Style (based on the celebrated book by Charles Rosen), which premiered in June 2014 at the Ojai Music Festival. Other noteworthy compositions by Stucky include the symphonic poem Radical Light (2007), Rhapsodies for Orchestra (2008), the oratorio August 4, 1964 (2008), a Symphony (2012), and his Second Concerto for Orchestra (2003), which won the 2005 Pulitzer Prize for Music. Stucky was an expert on the Polish composer Witold Lutosławski and authored the 1981 study Lutoslawski and His Music. He also was curator of the Philharmonia Orchestra's 2013 centenary celebration of that composer, Woven Words: Music Begins Where Words End. Stucky was the Given Foundation Professor of Composition at Cornell University in Ithaca, New York

There he founded Ensemble X and led it for nine seasons, from 1997 until 2006, while at the same time he also was the guiding force behind the celebrated Green Umbrella series in Los Angeles. He has also taught at Eastman and Berkeley, the latter as Ernest Bloch Professor in 2003. After several earlier teaching and conducting visits, in 2013 he became artist-faculty composer-in-residence at Aspen. In 2014 he became Professor Emeritus at Cornell and joined the composition faculty at Juilliard.

Among the composers who studied with Stucky are Joseph Phibbs, Marc Mellits, Robert Paterson, David Conte, Thomas C. Duffy, Yotam Haber, James Matheson, Steven Burke, Xi Wang, Spencer Topel, Diego Vega, Fang Man, Anna Weesner, Hannah Lash, Andrew Waggoner, Stephen Andrew Taylor, Sean Shepherd, Chris Arrell, Chris Gendall and Jesse Jones.

Steven Stucky taught master classes and served residencies around the world, including Beijing, Shanghai, the Cleveland Institute of Music, the Curtis Institute of Music, Rice University, Lawrence University, the Swedish Collegium for Advanced Study, the Tanglewood Music Center, and many others.

Stucky died of brain cancer at his home in Ithaca, New York on February 14, 2016.

== Compositions ==
=== Orchestral ===
- Kenningar (Symphony No. 4) (1977–78)
- Transparent Things: In Memoriam V.N. (1980)
- Double Concerto (1982–85, rev. 1989), for violin, oboe/oboe d'amore & chamber orchestra
- Voyages (1983–84), for cello & orchestral winds
- Dreamwaltzes (1986)
- Concerto for Orchestra No. 1 (1986–87)
- Son et Lumière (1988)
- Threnos (1988), for wind ensemble
- Angelus (1989–90)
- Anniversary Greeting (1991)
- Impromptus (1991)
- Funeral Music for Queen Mary (after Purcell) (1992), for orchestral winds
- To Whom I Said Farewell (1992, rev. 2003), for mezzo-soprano & chamber orchestra
- Fanfare for Los Angeles (1993)
- Ancora (1994)
- Fanfares and Arias (1994), for wind ensemble
- Fanfare for Cincinnati (1994)
- Concerto for Two Flutes and Orchestra (1994)
- Pinturas de Tamayo (1995)
- Music for Saxophones and Strings (1996)
- Concerto Mediterraneo (1998), for guitar & orchestra
- Escondido Fanfare (1998)
- American Muse (1999), for baritone & orchestra
- Concerto for Percussion and Wind Orchestra (2001)
- Colburn Variations (2002), for string orchestra
- Etudes (2002), concerto for recorder & chamber orchestra
- Spirit Voices (2002–03), concerto for percussion & orchestra
- Second Concerto for Orchestra (2003)
- Jeu de timbres (2003)
- Hue and Cry (2006), for wind ensemble
- Radical Light (2006–07)
- Rhapsodies for Orchestra (2008)
- Chamber Concerto (2009)
- Silent Spring (2011)
- Symphony (2012)

=== Opera ===
- The Classical Style: An Opera (of Sorts) (2013–14), libretto by Jeremy Denk, after the book by Charles Rosen

=== Choral ===
- Spring and Fall: To a Young Child (1972), for a cappella SATB choir
- Drop, drop, slow tears (1979), for a cappella SSAATTBB choir
- Cradle Songs (1997), for a cappella SATB choir
- To Musick (2000), for a cappella men's choir
- Skylarks (2001), for a cappella S.A. & SATB choir
- Whispers (2002), for a cappella SATB soli & SATTBB choir
- Three New Motets (2005), for a cappella double SATB choir (O admirabile commercium, O sacrum convivium, O vos omnes)
- Eyesight (2007), for a cappella SATB choir
- August 4, 1964 (2007–08), for soprano, mezzo-soprano, tenor & baritone soli, SATB choir & orchestra
- The Kingdom of God (In No Strange Land) (2008), for a cappella SATB choir
- Gravity’s Dream (2009), for a cappella SATB choir
- Say Thou Dost Love Me (2012) for a cappella SATB choir
- Take Him, Earth (2012) for SATB choir with chamber orchestra
- Winter Stars (2014) for a cappella SATB choir
- The Music of Light (2015) for double a cappella SATB choir

=== Chamber ===
- Duo (1969), for viola & cello
- Movements (1970), for four celli
- Quartet (1972–73), for clarinet, viola, cello & piano
- Movements III.: Seven Sketches (1976), for flute & clarinet
- Refrains (1976), for five percussion
- Notturno (1981), for alto saxophone & piano
- Varianti (1982), for flute, clarinet & piano
- Boston Fancies (1985), for flute, clarinet, percussion, piano, violin, viola & cello
- Serenade (1990), for wind quintet
- Birthday Fanfare (1993), for three trumpets
- Salute (1997), for flute, clarinet, horn, trombone, percussion, piano, violin & cello
- Ad Parnassum (1998), for flute, clarinet, percussion, piano, violin & cello
- Ai due amici (1998), for chamber ensemble
- Tres Pinturas (1998), for violin & piano
- Nell'ombra, nella luce (1999–2000), for string quartet
- Partita-Pastorale after J.S.B. (2000), for clarinet, piano & string quartet
- Tamayo Nocturne (2001), for chamber ensemble
- Sonate en forme de préludes (2003–04), for oboe, horn & harpsichord
- Meditation and Dance (2004), for clarinet & piano
- Piano Quartet (2005), for violin, viola, cello & piano
- Four Postcards (2008), for wind quintet & marimba
- Piano Quintet (2009–10), for two violins, viola, cello & piano
- Scherzino (2010), for alto saxophone and piano
- Allegretto quasi Andantino (Schubert Dream) (2010), for piano four hands
- Aus der Jugendzeit (2011), for bass-baritone, flute, clarinet/bass clarinet, violin, cello, piano, and percussion
- Rain Shadow (2012), for violin, viola, cello & piano
- Sonata for Violin and Piano (2013)
- Cantus (2015), for 6 players

=== Vocal ===
- Sappho Fragments (1982), for female voice & chamber ensemble
- Two Holy Sonnets of Donne (1982), mezzo-soprano, oboe & piano
- Four Poems of A.R. Ammons (1992), for baritone & chamber ensemble
- To Whom I Said Farewell (1992, rev. 2003), for mezzo-soprano & chamber orchestra
- American Muse (1999), for baritone & orchestra
- Aus der Jugendzeit (2010–11), for baritone & chamber ensemble
- The Stars and the Roses (2013), for tenor & orchestra
- The Stars and the Roses (2013), for tenor & chamber ensemble
- Out of the Cradle Endlessly Rocking (2014), for bass-baritone & piano

=== Solo instrumental ===
- Three Little Variations for David (2000), for solo piano
- Album Leaves (2002), for solo piano
- Dialoghi (2006), for solo cello
- Dust Devil (2009), for solo marimba
- Isabelle Dances (2009–10), for solo marimba
- Sonata for Piano (2014)

=== Arrangements of music by other composers ===
- Noctuelles (Miroirs, No.1) (Maurice Ravel, orch. Stucky 2001) (Theodore Presser Co.)
- Les Noces (Igor Stravinsky, orch. Stucky 2005), for solo voices, SATB. and full orchestra (Chester Music)
- Bucolics (Witold Lutosławski, arr. Stucky 2006), for 9 instruments (Chester Music)
- Eight Songs from the Spanish Songbook (Hugo Wolf, orch. Stucky 2008), for mezzo-soprano & orchestra (Theodore Presser Co.)
- Four songs for the Dolce Suono Ensemble and baritone voice ("Per questa bella mano", "Ruhe sanft" (from Zaide), and "Das Veilchen" by Mozart; "Erlkönig" by Schubert, arr. Stucky 2012) (Theodore Presser Co.)

== Awards ==
- 1974: ASCAP Victor Herbert Prize for composition
- 1975: First Prize, American Society of University Composers Competition
- 1978: Composer Fellowship, National Endowment for the Arts
- 1982: ASCAP Deems Taylor Award (for "Lutoslawski and His Music")
- 1986: John Simon Guggenheim Fellowship
- 1989: Finalist, Pulitzer Prize for Music (Concerto for Orchestra No. 1)
- 1991: Koussevitzky Music Foundation Commission
- 1995: Special Commendation, National Association of Composers USA
- 1997: Bogliasco Foundation Fellowship, Centro Studi Ligure (Italy)
- 1998: Barlow Endowment Commission
- 2001: Aaron Copland Fund for American Music recording grant
- 2002: Goddard Lieberson Fellowship, American Academy of Arts and Letters
- 2003: Bloch Lecturer, University of California at Berkeley
- 2005: Pulitzer Prize for Music for Second Concerto for Orchestra
- 2006: Paul Fromm Composer-in-Residence, American Academy in Rome
- 2006: Elected a trustee of the American Academy in Rome
- 2006: Elected to the American Academy of Arts and Sciences
- 2006: Joined Board of Directors of the Koussevitzky Music Foundation
- 2007: Elected to the American Academy of Arts and Letters
- 2008: Elected Chair of the Board of Directors, American Music Center
- 2011: Elected Vice-Chair of the Board of Directors, New Music USA
- 2011: Composer of the Year, Pittsburgh Symphony Orchestra, 2011/12 season
- 2013: August 4, 1964 Grammy Award nominee for Best Classical Contemporary Composition
- 2013: Brock Commission
