= Peter Ash (composer) =

American classical composer

Peter Ash (born 1961, in DeWitt, Iowa ) is a composer and conductor, best known for his opera The Golden Ticket (based on the Roald Dahl book Charlie and the Chocolate Factory ) and for his work with the London Schools Symphony Orchestra, of which he has been artistic director since 2001.

A graduate of Guildhall School of Music, Ash has conducted the Royal Philharmonic Orchestra, London Sinfonietta, Scottish Chamber Orchestra, Los Angeles Opera (where he conducted the world premiere of Tobias Picker's opera Fantastic Mr. Fox), Lisbon Opera, English Bach Festival and many other ensembles, including the Scharoun Ensemble (composed of members of the Berlin Philharmonic ) at the Salzburg Festival; in 2006, the Hungarian Cultural Centre awarded him its Bartók Prize for his performances of the composer’s music and in particular for a performance of Bluebeard’s Castle.

His first opera, Keepers of the Night, was premiered by the Los Angeles Children’s Chorus in 2007 to critical acclaim. His most recent opera, The Golden Ticket, was premiered by Opera Theatre St Louis in June 2010, repeated at the Wexford Festival Opera in Ireland in October, 2010, then recorded in Atlanta, Georgia in November, 2012, with the composer conducting. Gramophone Magazine praised the release (on the Albany label), saying "Ash's score brims with tuneful and contemporary ingredients, as well as nods to Wagner, Britten, Bernstein and others" and calling it "an uproarious and endearing operatic adventure" He has also published incidental music for Cloud 9 (play) by Caryl Churchill and music for television. His 2009 song cycle Paradox, based on texts by Willa Cather and William Shakespeare, was commissioned by mezzo-soprano Katharine Goeldner, flautist Amy Morris and pianist Michael Heaston for "The Prairie Song Project," and released on CD in 2016. Future projects include a choral work based on Roald Dahl and a third opera.
