= Jeremy Denk =

American classical pianist

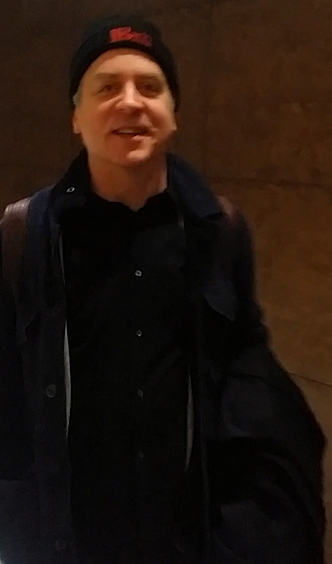
- In Montréal, Québec, Canada, at the MBAM Bourgie Hall
- Born: May 16, 1970 (age 56); Durham, North Carolina, U.S.
- Occupation: Classical pianist

Jeremy Denk (born May 16, 1970) is an American pianist. He was awarded a MacArthur "Genius" Fellowship in 2013, won the Avery Fisher Prize in 2014, and was elected to the American Academy of Arts and Sciences in 2016.

== Early life ==
Denk was born in 1970 in Durham, North Carolina. He did not come from a musical family. After several years in New Jersey, his family settled in Las Cruces, New Mexico, where he grew up. He attended Oberlin College and graduate school at Indiana University Bloomington, where he studied with György Sebők. He also attended the Juilliard School.

== Career ==
Denk has performed throughout the US and Europe in recital and with major symphony orchestras and has toured with Academy of St Martin in the Fields.

Denk's releases from Nonesuch Records include the opera The Classical Style with music by Haydn, Mozart, and Beethoven. He joined his long-time musical partners, Joshua Bell and Steven Isserlis, in a recording of Brahms' Trio in B-major. His previous disc of the Goldberg Variations reached number one on Billboard's Classical Chart. He won Musical America's Instrumentalist of the Year award.

In 2014, Denk served as music director of the Ojai Music Festival, for which, besides performing and curating, he wrote the libretto for a comic opera, The Classical Style, with music by Steven Stucky. The opera was later presented by Carnegie Hall and the Aspen Festival.

Denk is known for his original and insightful writing on music, which Alex Ross praises for its "arresting sensitivity and wit." His writing has appeared in The New Yorker, The New Republic, The Guardian, and on the front page of The New York Times Book Review. His New York Times-bestselling memoir "Every Good Boy Does Fine" published by Random House in the US, and Macmillan in the UK, expands on an essay first published in the New Yorker in 2013.

His original blog, Think Denk, recounts his experiences of touring, performing, and practicing, and was selected for inclusion in the Library of Congress web archives. In 2024, he resumed his blogging on the Substack platform, entitled Denk Again.

In 2012, Denk made his Nonesuch debut with a pairing of masterpieces old and new: Beethoven's final Piano Sonata No. 32, Op. 111, and Ligeti's Études. The album was named one of the best of 2012 by The New Yorker, NPR, and The Washington Post, and Denk's account of the Beethoven sonata was selected by BBC Radio 3's Building a Library as the best available version recorded on modern piano. Denk has a long-standing attachment to the music of American visionary Charles Ives, and his recording of Ives's two piano sonatas featured in many "best of the year" lists.

In 2019, Denk released an album entitled c.1300–c.2000, of piano versions of pieces by composers from circa the years 1300 to 2000. The album was released on Nonesuch Records. He discussed the work on BBC Radio 4's Front Row in March 2019.

Denk made his Edinburgh International Festival debut in August 2019 with a programme of piano works by Bach, Ligeti, Liszt, Berg and Schumann.

He lives in New York City.

== Recordings ==
- November 2002: Brahms and Dvořák Quintets, with Concertante Chamber Ensemble. Meridian Records
- February 2003: Tobias Picker's Piano Concerto No. 2 ("Keys to the City"). Russian Philharmonic. Thomas Sanderling, conductor. Chandos Records
- March 2007: Works for Solo Piano by Leon Kirchner. Sonata No. 2 for Piano. Albany Records
- September 2007: John Corigliano Violin Sonata. Joshua Bell, violin. Sony Records
- April 2009: Gabriel Fauré Violin Sonata. Chausson Concert. Soovin Kim/Jupiter String Quartet. Azica Records
- April 2010: Johannes Brahms: Sonatas for Viola and Piano. Roberto Diaz, Viola. Naxos
- October 2010: Jeremy Denk Plays Ives, which features Charles Ives' Piano Sonatas Nos. 1 and 2, on his Think Denk Media Label
- October 2011: Bach Partitas 3, 4, 6. Azica Records
- January 2012: French Impressions, including sonatas of Franck, Ravel, and Saint-Saëns with violinist Joshua Bell, Sony Classical
- May 2012: Ligeti/Beethoven, including Books I and II of György Ligeti's piano études and Beethoven's Piano Sonata No. 32, Nonesuch Records
- November 2012: American Mavericks, including Henry Cowell's Synchrony and Piano Concerto with Michael Tilson Thomas, SFS Media
- September 2013: J.S. Bach: Goldberg Variations, Nonesuch Records
- February 2019: c. 1300–c. 2000, Nonesuch Records
- September 2021: Mozart Piano Concertos, K.503 in C Major and K.466 in D Minor with Saint Paul Chamber Orchestra, Nonesuch Records
- August 2024: Mendelssohn Piano Trios. Joshua Bell, violin. Steven Isserlis, cello. Sony Classical
- October 2024: IVES DENK. Stefan Jackiw, violin. Nonesuch Records

== Bibliography ==
A partial list of Denk's writings includes:

- Denk, Jeremy (April 8, 2013). "Every good boy does fine : a life in piano lessons". Personal History. The New Yorker. Vol. 89, no. 8. pp. 40–45.
- Denk, Jeremy (2022). Every Good Boy Does Fine; A Love Story in Music Lessons. Random House.
