= List of compositions by Kaija Saariaho =

Kaija Saariaho
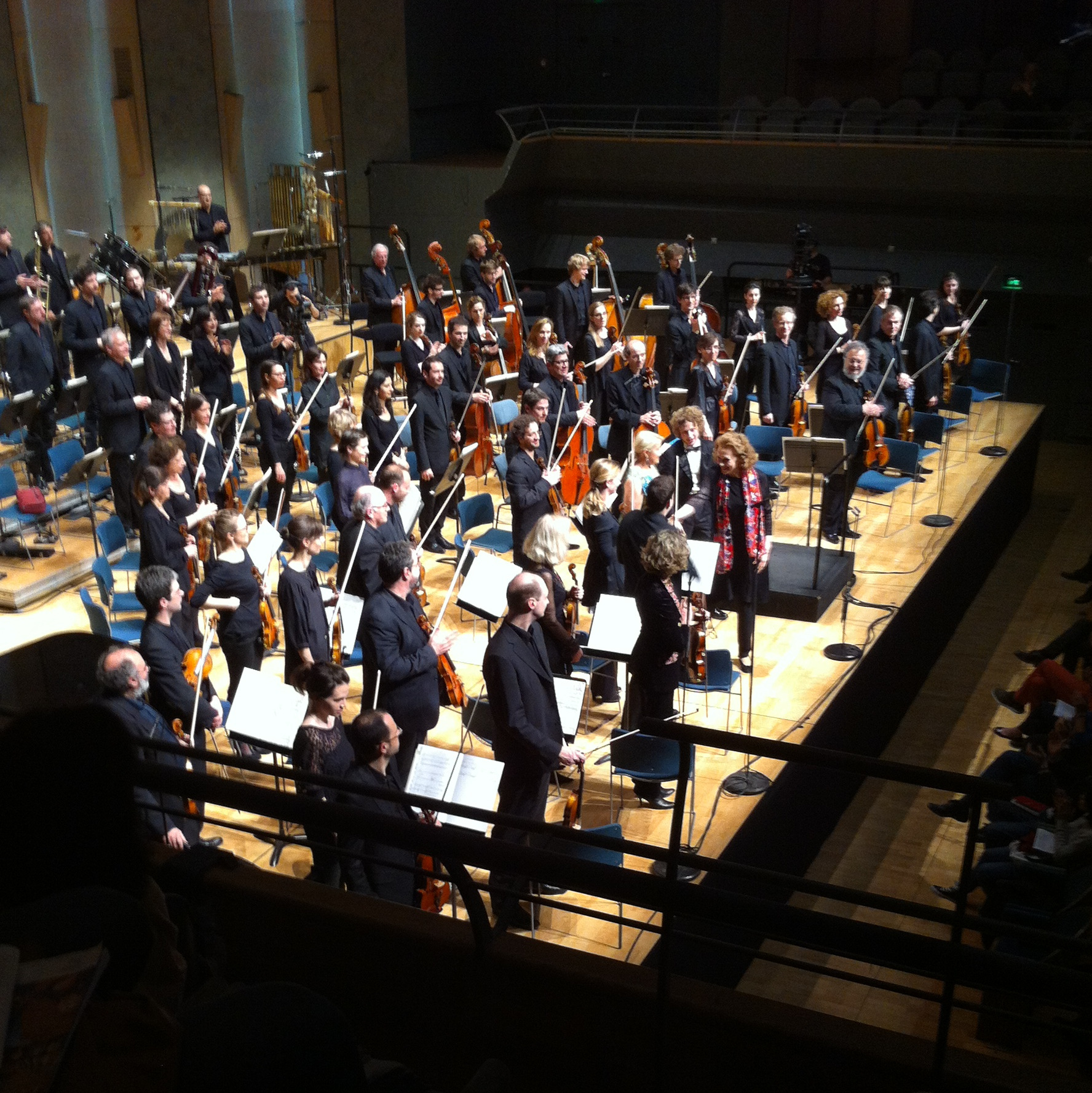
- Saariaho at Cité de la Musique, Paris 2013
- Born: Kaija Laakkonen; 14 October 1952; Helsinki, Finland
- Died: 2 June 2023 (aged 70); Paris, France

This is a list of compositions by Kaija Saariaho.

Saariaho's compositions were published by Chester Music and Edition Wilhelm Hansen.

== Orchestra ==
Title	Year	Duration	Notes
Asteroid 4179	2005	4 min.	
Chimera	2019	1 min.	
Ciel d'hiver	2013	10 min.	
Circle Map	2012	26 min.	for orchestra and electronics
Du Cristal	1989	12 min.	for orchestra and electronics
Forty Heartbeats	1998	3 min.	
Laterna Magica	2008	20 min.	
Lumière et Pesanteur	2009	6 min.	
Nymphéa Reflection	2001	27 min.	for string orchestra
Orion	2002	22 min.	
Song for Betty	2001	5 min.	
Terra Memoria	2009	20 min.	string orchestra version of the 2006 string quartet
Verblendungen	1984	14 min.	for orchestra and tape
Vista	2019	25 min.	
Semafor	2020	14 min.	for sinfonietta

== Soloist(s) and orchestra ==
=== Instrumental ===
Title	Year	Soloist(s)	Duration	Notes
...à la Fumée	1990	alto flute and cello	19 min.	sequel to Du Cristal
Graal théâtre	1994	violin	25 min.	
Aile du songe	2001	flute	18 min.	
D'Om le Vrai Sens	2010	clarinet	35 min.	
Maan varjot	2013	organ	15 min.	
Notes on Light	2006	cello	28 min.	
Trans	2015	harp	20 min.	
HUSH	2023	trumpet	25 min.	premiered posthumously; written for soloist Verneri Pohjola.

=== Vocal ===
Title	Year	Soloist(s)	Duration	Text writer	Language	Notes
Adriana Songs	2006	mezzo-soprano	29 min.	Amin Maalouf	French	
Cinq reflets de L’Amour de loin	2001	soprano and baritone	30 min.	Amin Maalouf	French	
Émilie Suite	2011	soprano	25 min.	Amin Maalouf	French	
Leino Songs	2007	soprano	13 min.	Eino Leino	Finnish	
Mirage	2007	cello and soprano	12 min.	Maria Sabina	English	
Quatre instants	2002	soprano	23 min.	Amin Maalouf	French	orchestral version of the 2002 art songs
True Fire	2014	baritone	25 min.	Ralph Waldo Emerson, Seamus Heaney, trad. Native American, Mahmoud Darwish	English	
Saarikoski-laulut	2020	soprano	15 min.	Pentti Saarikoski	Finnish	orchestral version of the 2017 song cycle

== Large ensemble (7 or more players) ==
Title	Year	Instrumentation	Duration	Notes
Aer	1991	flute, percussion, harp, harpsichord, violin, viola, cello, and electronics	17 min.	
Io	1987	2 flutes (2nd doubling piccolo and alto flute), bass flute, 2 horns, trombone, tuba, percussion, harp, piano, 2 violins, viola, cello, double bass and electronics	17 min.	
Lichtbogen	1986	flute (doubling piccolo and alto flute), percussion, harp, piano, 2 violins, viola, cello, double bass and electronics	17 min.	
Neiges	1998	for 8 or 12 cellos	15 min.	one version available for 8 cellos, one for 12
Solar	1993	flute (doubling piccolo), oboe, clarinet, trumpet, 2 percussionists, harp, 2 pianos, violin, viola, double bass and electronics	18 min.	

== Soloist(s) and large ensemble (7 or more players) ==
=== Instrumental ===
Title	Year	Soloist	Ensemble instrumentation	Duration	Notes
Amers	1992	cello	piccolo, oboe, clarinet, bass clarinet, horn, 2 percussionists, harp, 2 keyboards, and electronics	20 min.	
Graal théâtre	1997	violin	flute (doubling piccolo), oboe, clarinet, bass clarinet, bassoon, 2 horns, trumpet, bass trombone, 2 percussionists, harp, piano, 2 violins, viola, cello, and double bass	25 min.	chamber version of the 1994 orchestra piece
Notes on Light	2010	cello	flute, oboe, clarinet, bassoon, horn, trumpet, trombone, tuba, timpani, 2 percussionists, harp, piano, celesta, 2 violins, viola, cello, and double bass	28 min.	ensemble version of the 2006 orchestra piece
Vers toi qui est si loin	2018	violin	piccolo, harp (optional), 2 violins, viola, cello, and double bass	7 min.	adaptation of the final aria of L'Amour de loin

=== Vocal ===
Title	Year	Soloist	Ensemble instrumentation	Duration	Text writer	Language	Notes
Message pour Gérard	2000	mezzo-soprano	alto flute (doubling piccolo), percussion, harp, violin, viola, cello, and double bass	4 min.	Kaija Saariaho (text collage)	French	
Tempest Songbook	2004	soprano and baritone	original: flute, clarinet, harp, guitar, mandolin, violin, viola, cello, and double bass alternate: recorder, harpsichord, lute, 2 violins, viola, cello, and double bass	21 min.	Shakespeare	English	one version for modern instruments, one for period instruments
Vers toi qui est si loin	2018	soprano	piccolo, harp (optional), 2 violins, viola, cello, and double bass	7 min.	Amin Maalouf	French	adaptation of the final aria of L'Amour de loin

== Works for 2–6 players ==
Title	Year	Instrumentation	Duration	Notes
Aure	2011	violin and viola (or cello)	5 min.	
The Bosun's Cheer	2014	sprechstimme speaker, flute (or violin), cello, and double bass	4 min.	one version for modern instruments, one for period instruments
Calices	2009	violin and piano	10 min.	
Cendres	1998	alto flute, piano, and cello	10 min.	
Ciel étoilé	1999	percussion and double bass	5 min.	
Cloud Trio	2009	violin, viola, and cello	20 min.	
Concordia	2017	violin and cello	20 min.	
Figura	2016	solo clarinet, piano, and string quartet	14 min.	
Gates	1991	flute, harpsichord, cello, and electronics (optional)	10 min.	
Im Traume	1980	cello and piano	10 min.	
Je sens un deuxième coeur	2003	viola, cello, and piano	15 min.	
Light and Matter	2014	piano, violin, and cello	12 min.	
Light still and moving	2016	flute and kantele	12 min.	
Mirrors	1997	flute and cello	4 min.	
New Gates	1996	flute, harp, and viola	12 min.	
Nymphéa	1987	string quartet and electronics	18 min.	
Offrande	2014	organ and cello	7 min.	
Oi Kuu	1990	bass clarinet (or bass flute) and cello	6 min.	
Serenatas	2008	piano, cello, and percussion	14 min.	
Terra Memoria	2006	string quartet	20 min.	
Terrestre	2002	solo flute, percussion, harp, violin, and cello	10 min.	
Tocar	2010	violin and piano	7 min.	
Trois Rivières	1994	percussion quartet and electronics	16 min.	

== Solo works ==
Title	Year	Instrumentation	Duration	Notes
Arabesques et adages	2016	piano	7 min.	
Ballade	2005	piano	6 min., 30 sec.	
Couleurs du vent	1998	alto flute	9 min.	
...de la Terre	1991	violin and electronics	15 min.	
Dolce Tormento	2004	piccolo	5 min.	
Dreaming Chaccone (Variation on the Chiacona of Giuseppe Colombi)	2010	cello		
Duft	2012	clarinet	10 min.	
Fall	1991	harp and electronics	5 min.	
Folia	1995	double bass and electronics	10 min.	
Frises	2011	violin and electronics	20 min.	
Jardin Secret II	1986	harpsichord and electronics	11 min.	
Laconisme de l'aile	1982	flute and electronics	9 min.	
NoaNoa	1992	flute and electronics	10 min.	
Nocturne	1994	violin	6 min.	
Petals	1988	cello and electronics	9 min.	
Prelude	2007	piano	7 min., 30 sec.	
Près	1992	cello and electronics	18 min.	
Sense	2016	violin		
Sept Papillons	2000	cello	10 min.	
Six Japanese Gardens	1994	percussion and electronics	19 min.	
Spins and Spells	1997	cello	7 min.	
Trois Rivières: Delta	2001	percussion and electronics	16 min.	
Vent nocturne	2006	viola and electronics	15 min.	

== Chorus (a cappella and with accompaniment) ==
Title	Year	Instrumentation	Duration	Text writer	Language	Notes
Château de l'âme	1996	solo soprano, SA chorus, and orchestra	22 min.	Kaija Saariaho (text collage)	French	
Echo!	2007	2 sopranos, alto, countertenor, 2 tenors, 2 basses, and electronics	10 min.	Aleksi Barrière	French	
Horloge, Tais-Tois!	2007	original: SA chorus and piano alternate: SA chorus, flute, clarinet, basson, percussion, and strings	3 min., 30 sec.	Aleksi Barrière	French	
Kesäpäivä	2011	SA chorus and 2 percussionists		Aleksi Barrière		
Nuits, adieux	1996	SATB chorus	10 min.	Jacques Roubaud, Honoré de Balzac	French	choral version of the 1991 piece for solo voices
Oltra mar	1999	SATB chorus and orchestra	22 min.	Amin Maalouf, Abou Said	French	
Reconnaissance	2020	SATB chorus, percussion, and double bass	20 min.	Aleksi Barrière		
Tag des Jahrs	2001	SATB chorus and electronics	15 min.	Friedrich Hölderlin	German	
Überzeugung	2001	3 female voices, violin, cello, and crotale (can be played by one of the singers)	2 min.	Friedrich Hölderlin	German	
Nej och inte	1979	female choir a cappella	5 min.	Gunnar Björling	Swedish	
Suomenkielinen sekakuorokappale	1979	solo soprano, solo baritone, mixed choir	9 min.		Finnish	

== Solo voice with up to 6 players ==
Title	Year	Instrumentation	Duration	Text writer	Language	Notes
Ariel's Hail	2000	soprano, flute, and harp	3 min.	Shakespeare	English	
Die Aussicht	1996 1998	original: soprano, flute, guitar, violin, and cello alternate: soprano, flute, piano, and cello	4 min.	Friedrich Hölderlin	German	
Caliban's Dream	1993 1995	original: baritone, clarinet, harp, guitar, mandolin, and double bass alternate: baritone, alto flute, harp, and cello	3 min.	Shakespeare	English	part of The Tempest Songbook
Changing Light	2002 2005 2019	original: soprano and violin alternate: soprano and flute alternate: baritone and cello	6 min.	translated from the Hebrew by Rabbi Jules Harlow	English	
Ferdinand's Comfort	2004	soprano, baritone, flute, harp (or piano), violin, cello, and double bass	4 min.	Shakespeare	English	part of The Tempest Songbook
From the Grammar of Dreams	1988 2002	original: 2 sopranos alternate: soprano and electronics	10 min.	Sylvia Plath	English	
Grammaire des Rêves	1988	soprano, alto, 2 flutes, harp, viola, and cello	11 min.	Paul Éluard (text collage)		
Il pleut	1986	soprano and piano	2 min.	Guillaume Apollinaire	French	
Iltarukous	2000	soprano and piano	3 min.	Eino Leino	Finnish	
Leino Songs	2007	soprano and piano	13 min.	Eino Leino	Finnish	chamber version of the 2007 piece for soprano and orchestra
Lonh	1996	soprano and electronics	20 min.	Jaufre Rudel	Old Occitan	
Luonnon kasvot	2013	voice and piano		Pentti Saarikoski	Finnish	
Mirage	2007	soprano, cello, and piano	12 min.	Maria Sabina	English	
Miranda's Lament	1997 2000	original: soprano, clarinet, harp, viola, and double bass alternate: soprano, flute, harp, violin, andcello	6 min.	Shakespeare	English	part of The Tempest Songbook
Nuits, adieux	1991	SATB and electronics	10 min.	Jacques Roubaud, Honoré de Balzac	French	
Prospero's Vision	2002 2019	original: baritone, clarinet, harp, violin, and double bass alternate: tenor and string quartet	5 min.	Shakespeare	English	part of The Tempest Songbook
Quatre instants	2002	soprano and piano	23 min.	Amin Maalouf	French	
Quatre Messages	1999	2 sopranos, flute, and harp	8 min.	Kaija Saariaho (text collage)	French	
Saarikoski-laulut	2017	soprano and piano	11 min.	Pentti Saarikoski	Finnish	
Sombre	2012	voice, bass flute, percussion, harp, and double bass	18 min.	Ezra Pound	English	
Tag des Jahrs	2006	2 sopranos, mezzo-soprano, countertenor, 2 tenors, bass, and electronics	15 min.	Friedrich Hölderlin	German	arranged by Rachid Safir

== Opera and musical theatre ==
Title	Year	Voices	Orchestra instrumentation	Duration	Librettist	Language	Notes
Adriana Mater	2005	mezzo-soprano, soprano, tenor, bass-baritone, and SATB chorus	large orchestra and electronics	2 hours	Amin Maalouf	French	
L'Amour de loin	2000	soprano, mezzo-soprano, baritone, and SATB chorus	large orchestra and electronics	2 hours	Amin Maalouf	French	
Émilie	2008	soprano	chamber orchestra and electronics	1 hour, 20 min.	Amin Maalouf	French	
La Passion de Simone	2006	soprano solo and SATB chorus	orchestra (or chamber orchestra)	1 hour, 15 min.	Amin Maalouf	French	one version for large orchestra, one for chamber orchestra
Innocence	2018	soprano, tenor, baritone, and SATB chorus	large orchestra	1 hour, 45 min.	Sofi Oksanen, translated by Aleksi Barrière	mainly English (also Finnish, Czech, French, Romanian, Swedish, German, Spanish, and Greek)	
Only the Sound Remains	2015	countertenor, bass-baritone, and SATB ensemble	flute (doubling alto flute and bass flute), percussion, kantele, 2 violins, viola, cello, and electronics	1 hour, 30 min.	inspired by Noh dramas (Always Strong and Feather mantle), translated by Ezra Pound and Ernest Fenollosa	English	

== Music for dance ==
Title	Year	Instrumentation	Duration
Maa	1991	flute, percussion, harp, harpsichord, violin, viola, cello, and electronics	1 hour, 30 min.

== Electronic music ==
Title	Year	Duration
Jardin Secret I	1985	10 min., 48 sec.
Stilleben	1988	
