= Vista (composition) =

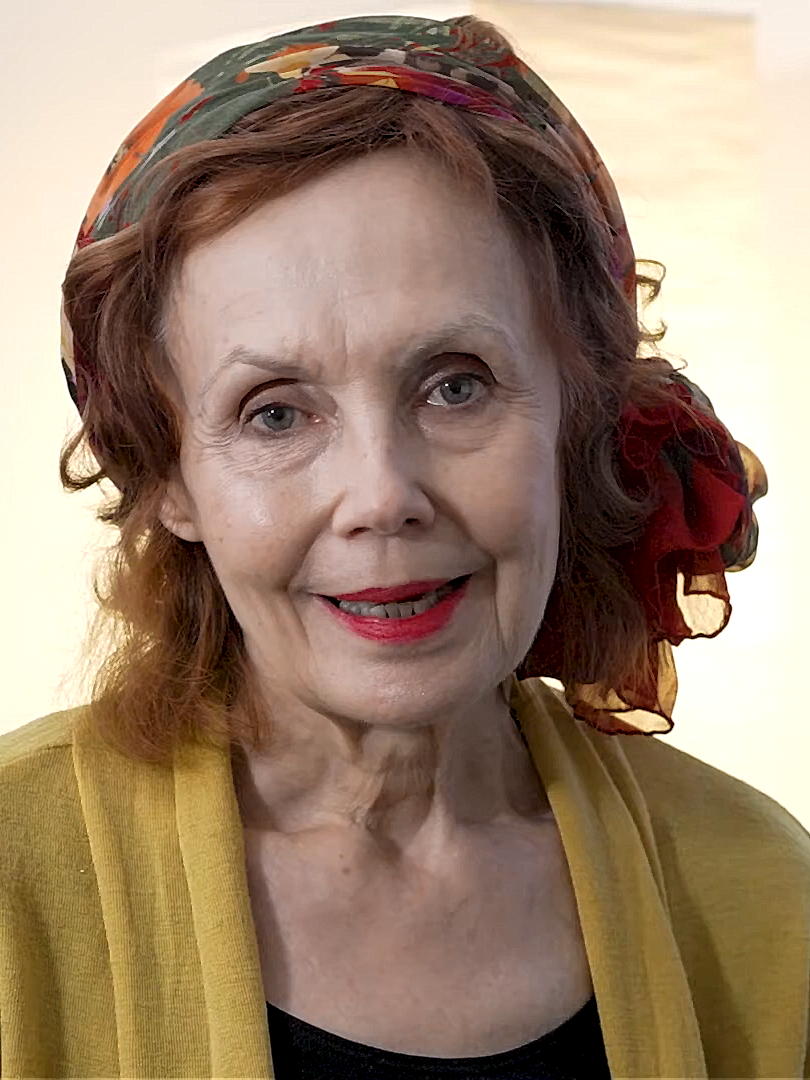
Kaija Saariaho in 2022

Vista is a composition for orchestra written by the Finnish composer Kaija Saariaho. The work was commissioned by the Berlin Philharmonic, the Helsinki Philharmonic Orchestra, the Los Angeles Philharmonic, and the Oslo Philharmonic. The world premiere took place at the Helsinki Music Centre on 12 May 2021 and was performed by the Helsinki Philharmonic Orchestra led by the conductor Susanna Mälkki, to whom the piece is dedicated.

== Composition ==
Vista has a duration of roughly 25 minutes and is cast in two connected movements:

1. Horizons
2. Targets

The piece was inspired by a drive taken by Saariaho from Los Angeles to San Diego following the premiere of her harp concerto Trans in January 2019. In the score program note, she wrote, "I was filled with joy after beautiful performances and enjoying the scenery on my right during the ride. We stopped every now and then to admire the view, and later I realized that most places were called vistas. As I literally also felt that new music was flowing into my mind and opening new kinds of ideas for the piece, I started calling it simply Vista."

=== Instrumentation ===
The work is scored for a large orchestra comprising three flutes (all doubling piccolo), three oboes, cor anglais, three clarinets (3rd doubling E-flat clarinet), bass clarinet, three bassoons (3rd doubling contrabassoon), four horns, four trumpets, three trombones, tuba, timpani, three percussionists, and strings.

== Reception ==
Reviewing the United States premiere of Vista performed by Mälkki and the Los Angeles Philharmonic, Mark Swed of the Los Angeles Times wrote, "Saariaho has a striking visual sensibility. An extraordinary musical colorist, she has a knack for capturing beauty within sound that has brought her a devoted following of entranced fans. The Halloween matinee performance, which I heard Sunday in Walt Disney Concert Hall, proved ethereal and, yes, haunting." Richard S. Ginell of the San Francisco Classical Voice similarly described the piece as "an absorbing new composition."

== See also ==
- List of compositions by Kaija Saariaho
