= Quatre instants =

Songs by Kaija Saariaho

- Song cycle by Kaija Saariaho
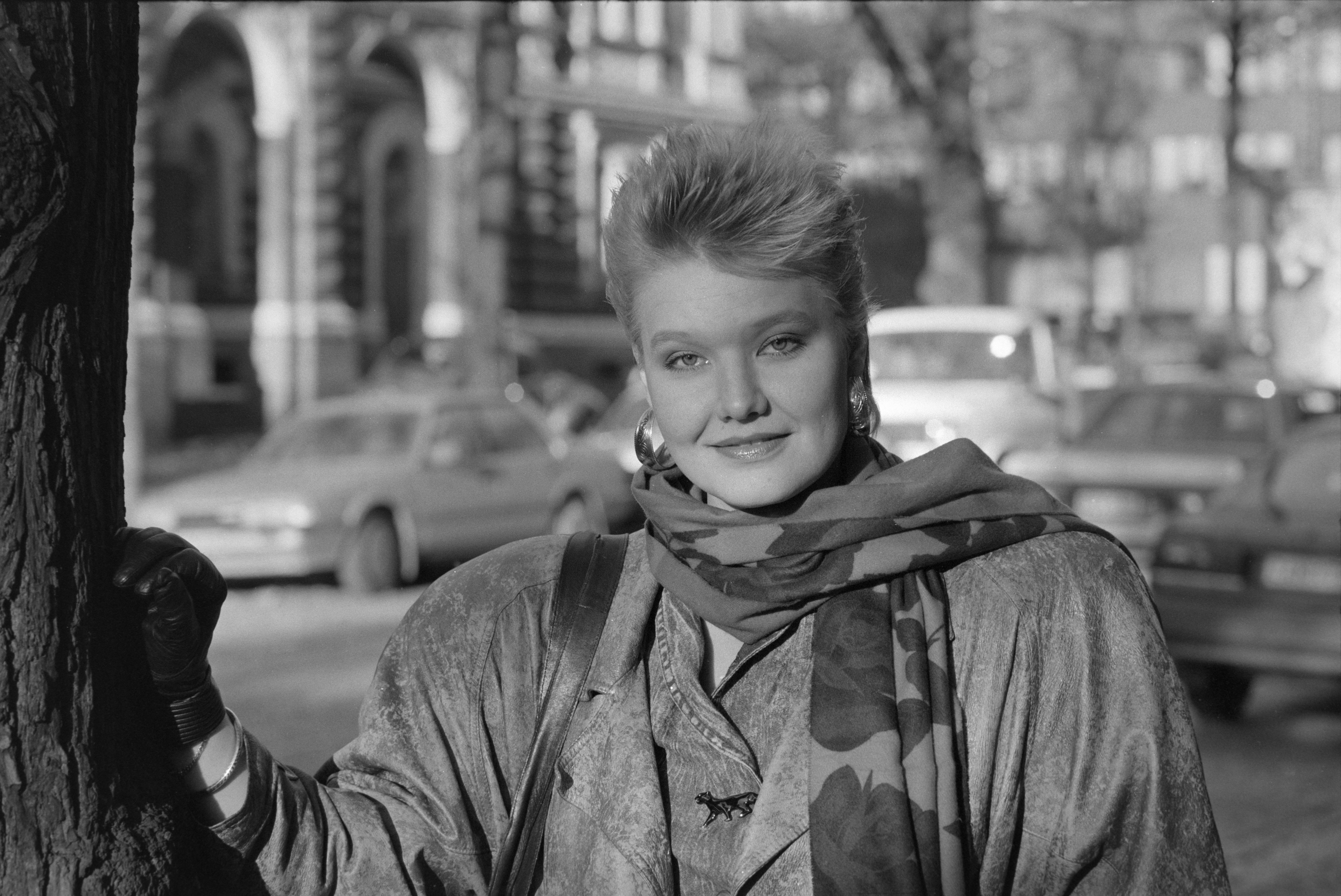
- Karita Mattila, singer and dedicatee, in 1988
- Catalogue: KS 83
- Text: poems by Amin Maalouf
- Language: French
- Composed: 2002
- Dedication: Karita Mattila
- Performed: 2 April 2003: Paris
- Movements: 4
- Scoring: soprano; piano (or orchestra or chamber orchestra)

Quatre instants (Four moments), KS 83, is a group of four songs for soprano and piano composed by Kaija Saariaho to poems in French by Amin Maalouf. The songs were premiered by soprano Karita Mattila , to whom they were dedicated, and pianist Tuija Hakkila in Paris on 2 April 2003. Saariaho also wrote versions for orchestra and chamber orchestra, all published by Chester Music. The work has been described as "a quasi-operatic monologue" in "erotic, extreme territory".

== History ==
The Finnish composer Kaija Saariaho wrote Quatre instants, setting four poems in French by Amin Maalouf to music for soprano and piano. The work was commissioned jointly the Théâtre du Châtelet and the Barbican Centre. It was Saariaho's second collaboration with Maalouf, and lead to a monodrama for Mattila which would become the opera Émilie. The world premiere of the song cycle on 2 April 2003 in Paris was performed by Karita Mattila, to whom the composition is dedicated, and pianist Tuija Hakkila. Mattila then took the songs to a European tour.

In 2002, Saariaho wrote versions of Quatre instants for orchestra and for chamber orchestra. The orchestral version was commissioned by the Finnish Chamber Orchestra Association and the Gewandhaus Orchestra. It was dedicated to Mattila and conductor Jukka-Pekka Saraste, who premiered it on 1 August 2003 at the Tammisaari Music Festival with the Finnish Chamber Orchestra. The version for chamber orchestra was premiered in Paris on 14 February 2017 by soprano Marisol Montalvo and the Secession Orchestra, conducted by Clément Mao-Takacs, as part of the Présences festival of Radio France.

The work was published in all versions by Chester Music.

== Text and music ==
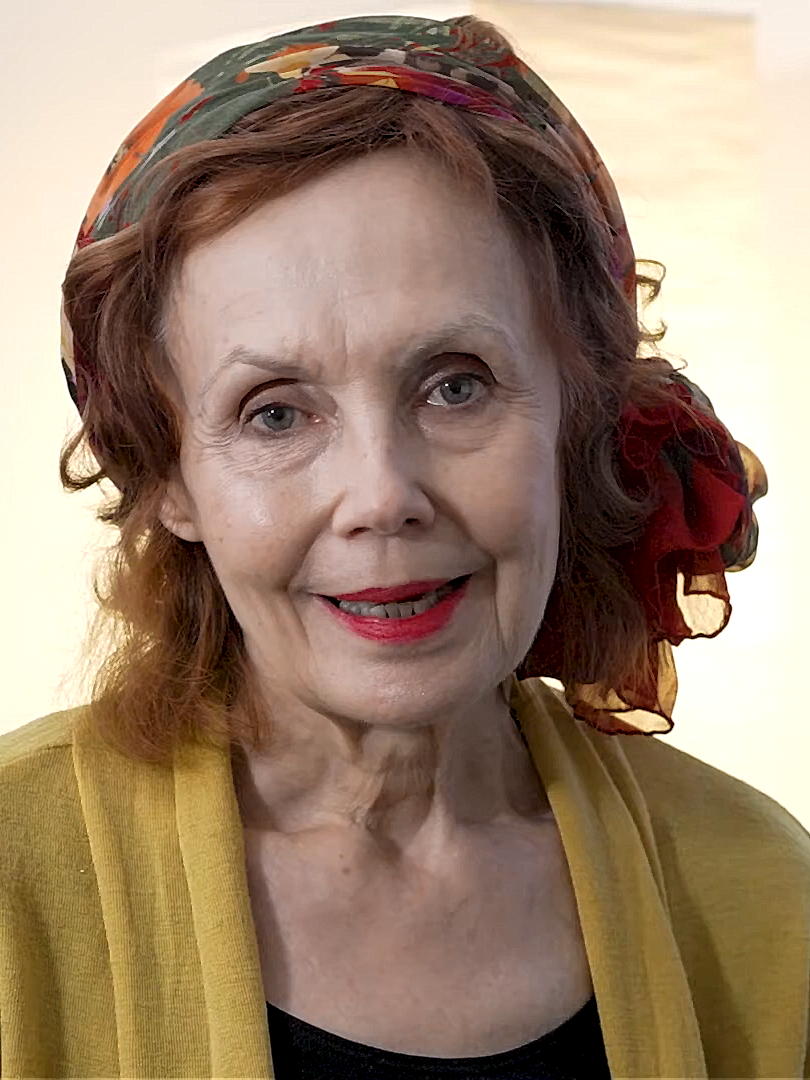
Saariaho in 2022

The poems and movements of Quatre instants are entitled:

1. Attente (Expectation)
2. Douleur (Torment)
3. Parfum de l'instant (Scent of the Instant)
4. Résonances (Echoes)

The duration is given as 25 minutes.

Tim Ashley, writing for The Guardian, described the songs as "a quasi-operatic monologue that plunges into the erotic, extreme territory", describing it as emotions in "erotic anticipation" and "inexplicable sexual terror", to ecstasy, and the piano part as "equally intense, ranging from filigree figurations to explosive outbursts".

== Recording ==
The orchestral version of Quatre instants was recorded, together with Saariaho's Émilie Suite, by soprano Karen Vourc'h and the Strasbourg Philharmonic Orchestra, conducted by Marko Letonja. A reviewer wrote for Gramophone, that the cycle displayed her "genius as a song-writer". He described the last song as "almost Janus-faced" closing the emotional circle inwardly while "outwardly ecstatic".
