= Avanti! Chamber Orchestra =

Finnish ensemble

The Avanti! Chamber Orchestra is a Finnish ensemble that focuses on contemporary music. The ensemble when it performs varies in size from a solo player to a symphony orchestra. Avanti! Chamber Orchestra won the Gramophone Prize with their first recording. The Orchestra also holds a music festival of its own each summer.

== The organization ==
Avanti! Chamber Orchestra was founded in 1983 at the initiative of conductors Esa-Pekka Salonen and Jukka-Pekka Saraste and flautist Olli Pohjola. It is an ensemble that varies in size from a solo player to a symphony orchestra depending on the performance. It does not specialize in a particular genre, but they tend to favor contemporary music. One example of this is HumppAvanti!, a collaboration with musician Timo Hietala, which mixed elements of popular and folk music.

Their first recording earned them the Gramophone Prize from the Finnish Broadcasting Company (YLE).

The orchestra frequently works with leading Finnish conductors and with internationally renowned soloists and conductors such as Heinz Holliger, Oliver Knussen, Ralf Gothoni, Gidon Kremer and Charles Neidich.

From 1994 to 1998 Anssi Karttunen was the artistic director of Avanti! Chamber Orchestra. Since 1998 the artistic director has been Finnish clarinettist Kari Kriikku, who was nominated for the Nordic Council’s Music Prize in 2001.

== Summer Sounds Festival ==
Since 1986, the orchestra has held a music festival of its own every summer in Porvoo called Summer Sounds. For the earliest festivals, various ideas were pooled with eclectic results. There are still traces of the original concept in the unexpected twists in the repertoire.

Since the late 1990s, the festival has invited a different artistic director each year. These have included Barbara Hannigan, Helmut Lachenmann, Oliver Knussen, HK Gruber, Anssi Karttunen, Sakari Oramo, Jukka-Pekka Saraste, Esa-Pekka Salonen, Kari Kriikku, John Storgårds, Magnus Lindberg, Jouni Kaipainen, Hannu Lintu, Kaija Saariaho, Kirmo Lintinen, Seppo Kimanen, and others.

The festival presents chamber music, orchestral concerts and events for children with international soloists and conductors. Every year, the artistic director of the festival invites a foreign guest composer to present his or her work to the Finnish audience.

== Discography ==
- Kriikku, Luoma, Mälkki, Avanti!
- Avanti! presents Humppavanti!
- Wennäkoski, Avanti!
- Kriikku, Avanti!
- Kriikku, Saraste, FRSO, Avanti!
- Oramo, Avanti!
- Avanti! Quartet CD
- Saraste, Avanti!, Bavarian RSO
- Saraste, Avanti!
- Kriikku, Avanti!
- Angervo, Saraste, Salonen, Avanti!
- Saraste, Avanti!
- Waltari, Niemi, Avanti!
- Lintu, Komsi, Avanti!
- Kriikku, Karttunen, Avanti! Kvartetti (eng. Avanti! Quartet)
