= Orion (composition) =

Finnish orchestral composition

Orion is an orchestral composition by the Finnish composer Kaija Saariaho. The work was written in 2002 on a commission from the Cleveland Orchestra. Its world premiere was performed by the Cleveland Orchestra led by conductor Franz Welser-Möst in Cleveland, Ohio, on 23 January 2003. The piece is dedicated to Welser-Möst and the Cleveland Orchestra.

== Composition ==
Orion has a duration of roughly 22 minutes and is cast in three movements:

1. Memento mori
2. Winter Sky
3. Hunter

=== Instrumentation ===
The work is scored for a large orchestra comprising four flutes (3rd doubling alto flute and piccolo; 4th doubling piccolo), four oboes (4th doubling cor anglais), four clarinets, four bassoons (4th doubling contrabassoon), six horns, four trumpets, three trombones, tuba, timpani (2 sets), four percussionists, two harps, piano, organ, and strings.

== Reception ==
David Fanning of Gramophone highly praised the piece, declaring that it "deserves to figure on any short list for orchestral masterpiece of the new millennium." In a more lukewarm review, Tim Ashley of The Guardian compared the piece to the composer's cello concerto Notes on Light, remarking that "both are soft-centred works that throb and thrum appealingly, but lack the underlying toughness of Saariaho's best music."

== See also ==
- List of compositions by Kaija Saariaho
