= Six Japanese Gardens =

1995 composition by Kaija Saariaho

- by Kaija Saariaho
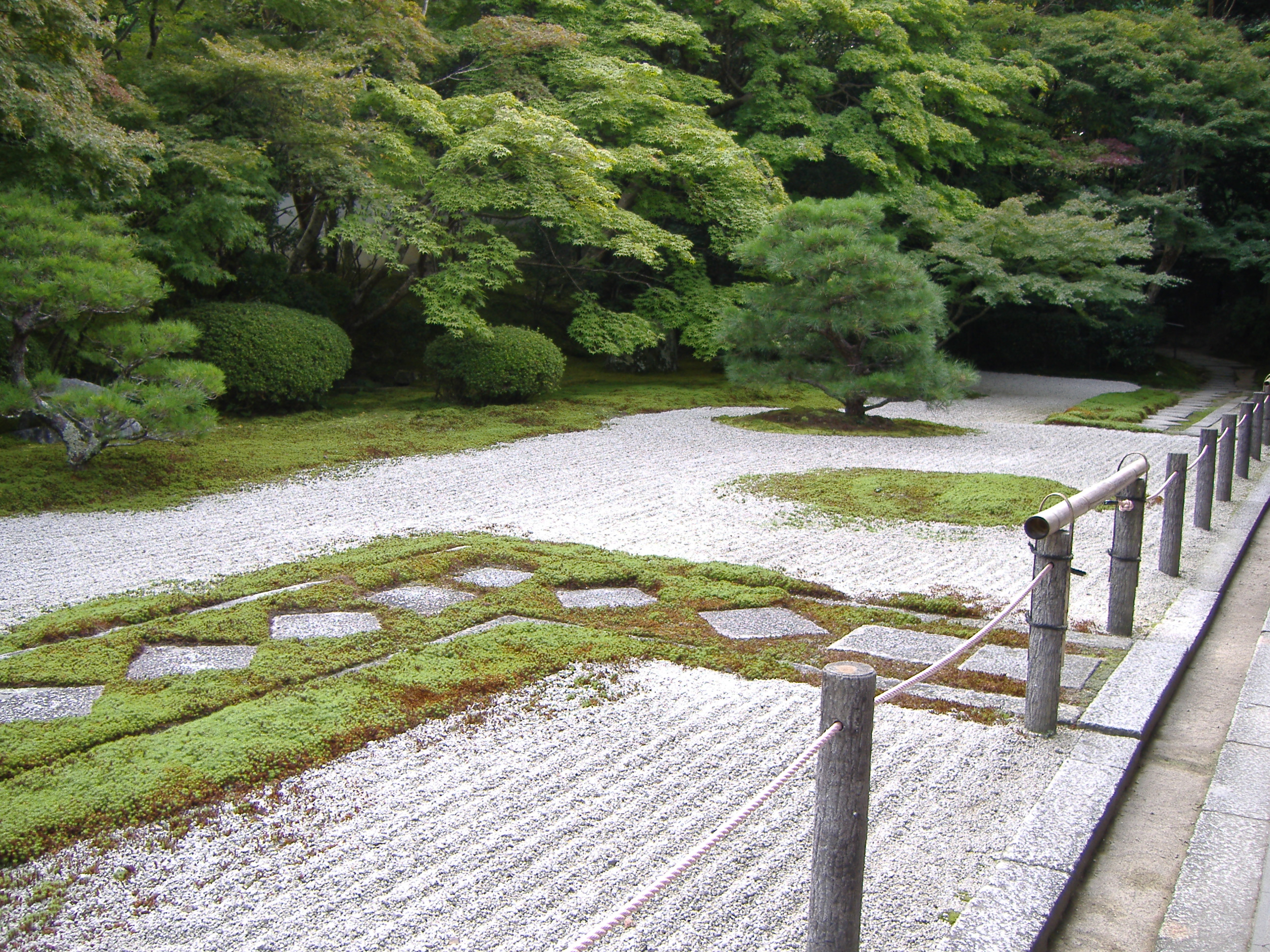
- Tenju-an Garden, Nanzen-ji
- Commissioned by: Kunitachi College of Music
- Composed: 24 September 1993 – 3 May 1995
- Dedication: Tōru Takemitsu
- Publisher: Chester Music
- Movements: 6
- Scoring: Percussion, electronics

Premiere
- Date: 12 July 1995
- Location: Tokyo (by Shiniti Ueno)

Six Japanese Gardens is a 1995 musical work for percussion and electronics by Finnish composer Kaija Saariaho, inspired by her visits to the gardens of Kyoto during the summer of 1993 and her thoughts on rhythm at this time.

== Instrumentation ==
Written for percussionist Shiniti Ueno and as itemized by musicologist Ilkka Oramo, the composition is scored for crotales, suspended cymbal, gongs, log drum, metal plate, tambourine, tam-tam, timpani, triangle, woodblock, and Zen gong, with freer choice of percussion instrument in some sections. Electronics include the filtered voices of crickets and humans, and prerecorded finger cymbals and other percussion.

== Movements ==
Inspired by the Japanese gardens of Kyoto, the composition is in six movements:

1. Tenju-an Garden of Nanzen-ji Temple
2. Many Pleasures (Garden of the Kinkaku-ji)
3. Dry Mountain Stream
4. Rock Garden of Ryoan-ji
5. Moss Garden of the Saiho-ji
6. Stone Bridges

== See also ==
- List of compositions by Kaija Saariaho
- Traditional Japanese instruments
- 100 Soundscapes of Japan
