= D'Om le Vrai Sens =

Clarinet concerto by Kaija Saariaho

D'Om le Vrai Sens (Man's True Sense) is a clarinet concerto by the Finnish composer Kaija Saariaho. The work was jointly commissioned by the Finnish Radio Symphony Orchestra, the BBC, the Fundação Casa da Musica, the Swedish Radio Symphony Orchestra, and Radio France. It was given its world premiere by the clarinetist Kari Kriikku and the Finnish Radio Symphony Orchestra under the conductor Sakari Oramo in Finlandia Hall, Helsinki, on September 8, 2010. The concerto is dedicated to Kari Kriikku.

== Composition ==
=== Background ===
Kaija Saariaho first conceived writing a clarinet concerto in while composing her second opera Adriana Mater in 2006. The composer later wrote, "the clarinet part began to be increasingly soloistic, and I found the instrument was speaking to me in a new way." Despite years of planning, Saariaho did not begin composing the work until the fall of 2009.

The music was inspired by The Lady and the Unicorn, a series of six medieval tapestries that depict the five traditional senses and an additional undefined sixth sense. The first five movements of the concerto are thus named after the five senses they represent: "L'Ouïe" (hearing), "La Vue" (sight), "L'Odorat" (smell), "Le Toucher" (touch), and "Le Goût" (taste). The sixth and final movement is titled "A mon seul Désir" and roughly translates in English as "to my only desire"; though the meaning of eponymous tapestry has been widely interpreted, Saariaho intended the movement to allude "both to the senses and to the true meaning of humankind."

The score uniquely requires the soloist to move about the concert hall during the performance. Saariaho described this decision in the score program notes, writing, "It came as a surprise even to me that the work began to come alive in its space, and that the clarinet – itself a unicorn – plays only some of its music in the soloist's position. This appropriation of space became an inherent element of the work at the composition stage."

=== Structure ===
D'Om le Vrai Sens has a duration of roughly 25 minutes and is composed in six connected movements:

1. L'Ouïe
2. La Vue
3. L'Odorat
4. Le Toucher
5. Le Goût
6. A mon seul Désir

=== Instrumentation ===
The work is scored for a solo clarinet and an orchestra comprising two flutes (1st doubling piccolo, 2nd doubling alto flute), two oboes (2nd doubling cor anglais), two clarinets (2nd doubling E♭ clarinet), bass clarinet, bassoon (doubling contrabassoon), four horns, trumpet, timpani, four percussionists, harp, celesta, and strings.

== Reception ==
D'Om le Vrai Sens has been praised by music critics. Reviewing a recording of the world premiere performance, Guy Rickards of Gramophone wrote:

Cast in six interlinked movements, the concerto (the subtitle renders roughly as 'Man's true sense') explores the five senses as depicted in the medieval tapestry series The Lady and the Unicorn. Hearing, Sight, Smell, Touch and Taste form a chain that resolves in the concluding A mon seul désir (an anagram of the title) in a remarkable synthesis and development of the work's content. Kriikku is invited, Musgrave-like, to move around the auditorium and audience in a live performance and though the recording does not really capture this spatial aspect little musically is lost.

Andrew Clements of The Guardian opined that the piece "has some striking ideas, but couldn't avoid mimsy theatricality either." He specifically criticized the blocking of the soloist, choreographed for that British premiere by Peter Sellars, remarking, "Neither Saariaho's beautifully terraced solo and orchestral writing nor Kriikku's phenomenal playing needed that." The concerto received similarly mixed praise from David Nice of The Arts Desk.
