= Hakkila =

Hakkila may refer to:

- Hakkila, Vantaa, a district of the city of Vantaa
- Tuija Hakkila (born 1959), Finnish pianist
- Väinö Hakkila (1882–1958), Finnish politician
