= Lucy Shelton =

American soprano singer

Lucy Shelton is an American soprano best known for her performance of contemporary music. She graduated from The Putney School in 1961 and Pomona College in 1965.

The only artist to receive the International Walter W. Naumberg Award twice (as a soloist and as a chamber musician), Shelton has performed repertoire from Bach to Boulez in major recital, chamber and orchestral venues throughout the world. A native Californian, Shelton's musical training began early with the study of both piano and flute. After graduating from Pomona College, she pursued singing at the New England Conservatory and at the Aspen Music School, where she studied with Jan de Gaetani.

Shelton has taught at the Cleveland Institute of Music, the New England Conservatory, and Eastman School of Music and at the Tanglewood Music Center. She is currently on the faculties of the Contemporary Performance Program at the Manhattan School of Music, and Yellow Barn and coaches privately at her studio in New York City. She has recorded for Deutsche Grammophon, KOCH International, Marco Polo, Bridge Records, Unicorn-Kanchana and Virgin Classics.

Most recently Shelton performed the role of The Teacher in the premiere of Kaija Saariaho's final opera, Innocence, at the Aix-en-Provence Festival, France, and all subsequent productions in Helsinki, London, Amsterdam, San Francisco and Adelaide, and at the age of 82, in April 2026, she made her Metropolitan Opera debut in the role. In 2024 at she premiered "Lucidity" by Laura Kaminsky with On Site Opera and with the Seattle Opera.
