= Kari Kriikku =

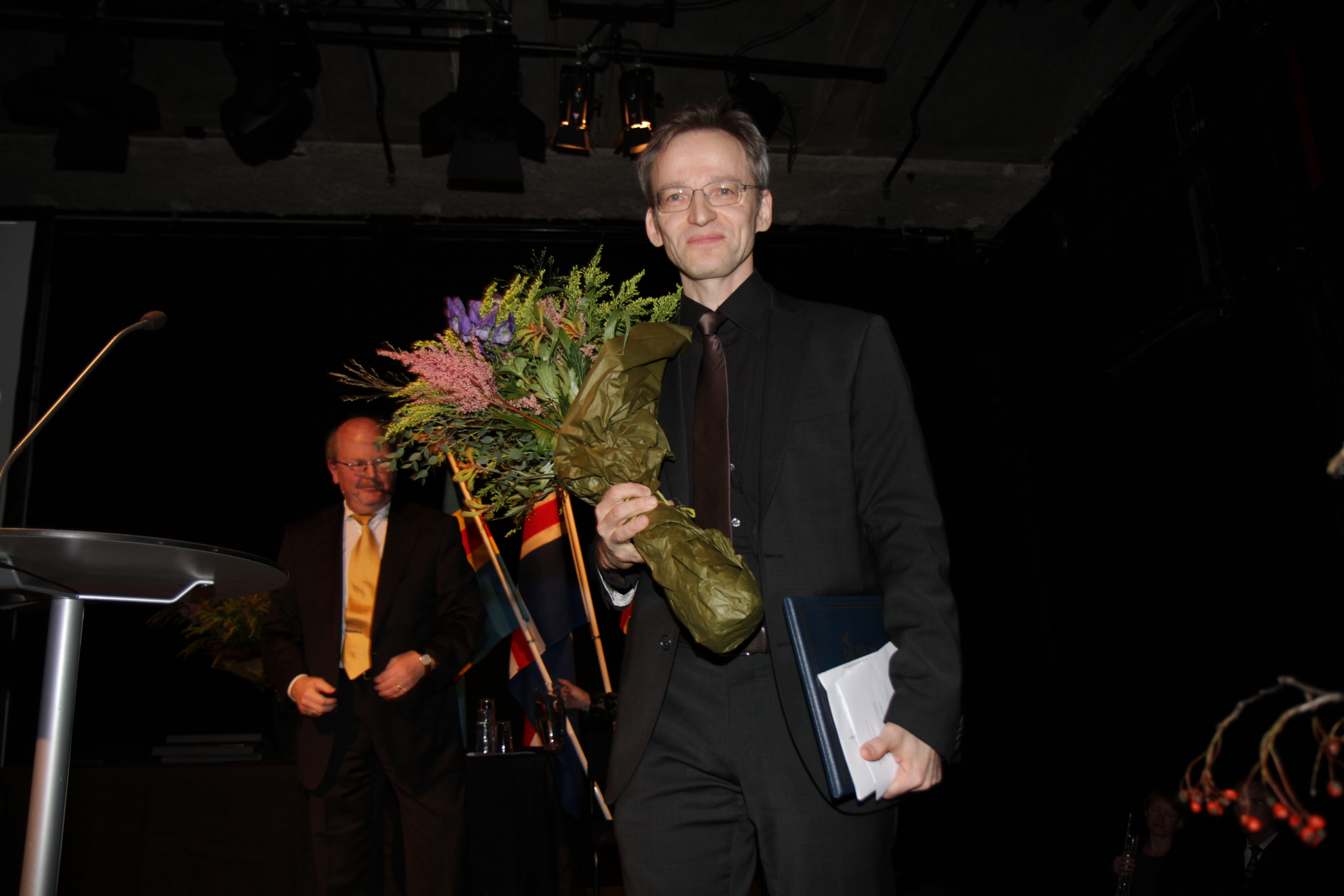
- Kari Kriikku in Stockholm in 2009
- Born: 1960 (age 65–66); Finland
- Education: Sibelius Academy
- Occupation: clarinetist
- Years active: 1980s-present
- Musical career
- Genres: classical; contemporary classical; baroque
- Instruments: clarinet; piano; drums
- Labels: Ondine; Finlandia Records
- Member of: Avanti! Chamber Orchestra

Kari Kriikku (born 1960) is a Finnish classical clarinetist.

Concentrating on contemporary music, Kriikku has served as an interpreter of works for the clarinet by composers such as Olli Koskelin, Vinko Globokar, Kaija Saariaho, Jukka Tiensuu, Jouni Kaipainen, Kimmo Hakola, Esa-Pekka Salonen, Pawel Szymanski, Eero Hämeenniemi, Magnus Lindberg, Michel van der Aa, and Usko Meriläinen.

== Early life ==
Kriikku was born near Seinäjoki, Finland into a musical family. His father was a trumpet player and a pianist; his mothers and sisters played the guitar and piano. Kriikku's first public performance was at a school end-of-term event, during which he and his father performed a piano four hands.

Kriikku left traditional school at age 16 to join the Helsinki Garrison Band, which required him to move into Army barracks. He later studied at the Sibelius Academy in Helsinki. He continued to study with clarinetists Alan Hacker in England, and Leon Russianoff and Charles Neidich in the United States.

== Career ==
Kari Kriikku co-founded the Avanti! Chamber Orchestra in 1983, and has served as the ensemble's artistic director since 1998.

Finnish contemporary classical composer Jukka Tiensuu wrote clarinet and orchestra concerto Puro (1989), and clarinet concerto Missa (2007) for Kriikku.

In 2002, composer Magnus Lindberg wrote his Clarinet Concerto specifically for Kriikku. The United States premiere performance took place in 2010, conducted by Alan Gilbert, with the New York Philharmonic at Carnegie Hall. The performance was praised by The New York Times, and Kriikku was described as "a player of Olympian virtuosity."

Kaija Saariaho wrote the clarinet part of her orchestra concerto D’om le Vrai Sens (2010) for Kriikku to perform. It was inspired by the six-panels of the 16th-century tapestries "The Lady and the Unicorn," with Saariaho conceiving the clarinet as the unicorn.

Kriikku gave the first performance of South Korean composer Unsuk Chin's Clarinet Concerto in Gothenburg, Sweden in 2014. The piece received a mixed review from The Guardian, with music critic Andrew Clements writing, "it doesn’t seem to be the major addition to the clarinet repertoire that, for instance, the concerto that Magnus Lindberg composed for Kriikku in 2002 most certainly is."

In late 2015, Kriikku toured with the New Zealand Symphony Orchestra under guest-conductor Miguel Harth-Bedoya.

Kriikku made his Minnesota Orchestra debut in March 2023, performing Saariaho's D’om le Vrai Sens (2010).

Kari Kriikku plays on Buffet Crampon RC Prestige clarinets.

== Awards ==
His recordings of the concertos of Carl Maria von Weber was voted "best ever" recording by Classic CD and BBC Music Magazine.

In 2006, his recording of Magnus Lindberg's Clarinet Concerto (2002) won both BBC Music Magazine's Award and the Classic FM Gramophone Award.

He was the 2009 winner of the Nordic Council Music Prize: the prize committee wrote, "Kari Kriikku is an extraordinary virtuoso on his instrument, the clarinet. His performance is characterised by flexibility and a positive musician's joy – he is a musician in the best sense of the word."

== Discography ==
Title	Released	Featuring	Label
Crusell: Complete Clarinet Quartets	1989	Avanti! Quartet	Ondine
The Virtuoso Clarinet	1989	Avanti! Chamber Orchestra	Finlandia
Alexander von Zemlinsky: Clarinet Trio, Op. 3 / Max Bruch: Eight Pieces, Op. 83	1991	Matti Hirvikangas (viola), Martti Rousi (cello), Arto Satukangas (piano)	Ondine
Claude Debussy: Rhapsody For Clarinet And Orchestra / Jukka Tiensuu: Puro / Jouni Kaipainen: Carpe Diem!	1991	Finnish Radio Symphony Orchestra, Avanti! Chamber Orchestra, Jukka-Pekka Saraste	Ondine
Magnus Lindberg: ...De Tartuffe / Je Crois / Linea D'Ombra / Ritratto / Zona	1992	Esa-Pekka Salonen (conductor), Anssi Karttunen (cello), Avanti! Chamber Orchestra	Finlandia
Carl Maria von Weber: Clarinet Quintet; Grand Duo Concertante / Felix Mendelssohn: Concert Pieces 1 & 2 for Clarinet, Basset-horn and Piano	1994	New Helsinki Quartet, Osmo Linkola (basset-horn), Arto Satukangas (piano)	Ondine
Klarinetti!	1994	Osmo Linkola, Anna-Maija Korismaa, Kullervo Kojo, Suomalainen klarinettiyhtye	Suomen Kuvalehti Classica
From Scandinavia: Lindberg, Sørensen, Saariaho, Tiensuu	1996	Arditti String Quartet, Jukka Tiensuu	Auvidis, Montaigne
Carl Maria von Weber: Clariner Concertos 1 & 2 / Concertino / Clarinet Quintet	1997	Finnish Radio Symphony Orchestra, Sakari Oramo	Ondine
Avanti!	1997	Avanti! Chamber Orchestra, John Storgårds	Ilmailulaitos
Crusell: Clarinet Concertos	2000	Finnish Radio Symphony Orchestra, Sakari Oramo	Ondine
Kimmo Hakola: Clarinet Quintet / Loco / Capriole	2002	Avanti! Quartet, Anssi Karttunen (cello)	Ondine
A Century of Finnish Chamber Music: Live from the Kuhmo Festival	2002	Various artists	Ondine
W.A. Mozart / Johann Molter: Clarinet Concertos	2005	Tapiola Sinfonietta, John Storgårds	Ondine
Kimmo Hakola: Clarinet Concerto / Verdoyances crépscules / Diamond Street	2005	Finnish Radio Symphony Orchestra, Sakari Oramo	Ondine
Magnus Lindberg: Clarinet Concerto // Gran Duo // Chorale	2005	Finnish Radio Symphony Orchestra, Sakari Oramo	Ondine
A Due	2007	Anssi Karttunen (cello)	Ondine
Jukka Tiensuu: Nemo · Puro · Spiriti	2008	Mikko Luoma (accordion), Avanti!, Susanna Mälkki (conductor)	Alba
Bizarre Bazaar	2009	Tapiola Sinfonietta, Jan Söderblom	Ondine
Jukka Tiensuu - Vie / Missa for Clarinet and Orchestra / False Memories I-III	2010	Helsinki Philharmonic Orchestra, John Storgårds	Ondine
Uljas Pulkkis: Tales of Joy, Passion and Love	2011	Gabriel Suovanen, Hannu Lintu, Tampere Philharmonic Orchestra	Ondine
Saariaho - D'om Le Vrai Sens for clarinet and orchestra / Laterna Magica / Leino Songs	2011	Anu Komsi, Finnish Radio Symphony Orchestra, Sakari Oramo	Ondine
Magnus Lindberg: Chamber Works	2012	Anssi Karttunen (cello), Magnus Lindberg (piano)	Ondine
Brahms-Glanert: Four Serious Songs / Brahms-Berio: Clarinet Sonata No. 1 / Glanert: Weites Land	2017	Michael Nagy (baritone), Helsinki Philharmonic Orchestra, Olari Elts (conductor)	Ondine
