= Vilma Jää =

Finnish singer

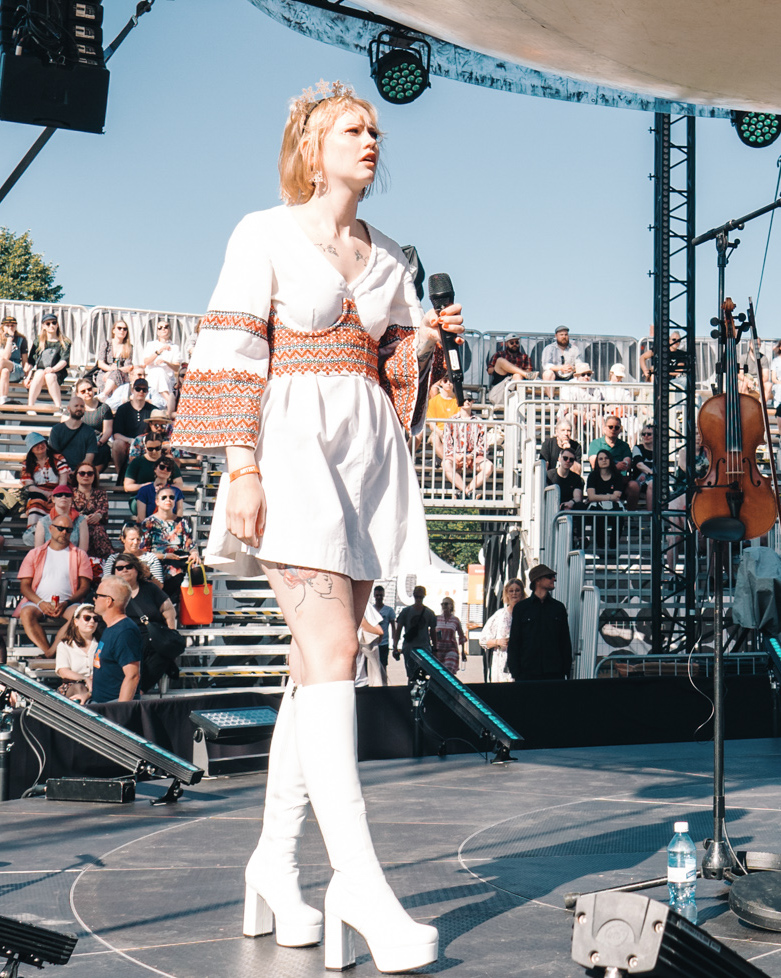
- Born: 20 November 1995 (age 30); Hollola, Päijät-Häme, Finland
- Education: Sibelius Academy (MMus)
- Occupations: Singer, composer
- Years active: 2016–
- Style: Folk, opera, pop
- Website: vilmajaa.fi

Vilma Jää (born 20 November 1995 in Hollola, Finland) is a Finnish singer, composer, and fiddler. A specialist in Finnish folk music, she is best known for her role in the 2021 opera Innocence.

== Career ==
While composing her opera Innocence, the Finnish composer Kaija Saariaho discovered Jää on YouTube and asked her for an audition tape. The two then collaborated to create the role of Marketa, with Saariaho tailoring the music to Jää's voice and technique. Upon the opera's premiere at the Aix-en-Provence Festival in 2021, Jää's performance received wide acclaim. She has reprised the role at the Finnish National Opera, the Dutch National Opera, and the Metropolitan Opera, among others.

Jää's debut album, Kosto, was released in 2023. It combined Finnish folklore with electronic music. On 5 June 2026, Jää's "Manalan Mailla", which was exclusively made for the Control Resonant trailer, premiered.
