= Ernst Kovacic =

Austrian violinist and conductor (born 1943)

Ernst Kovacic (born 12 April 1943 in Kapfenberg, Styria) is an Austrian violinist and conductor.

== Studies ==
Ernst Kovacic studied violin, piano and organ at the University of Music and Performing Arts in Vienna and took composition lessons there. He has been teaching at the university since 1975. In 1971 he won first prize in the violin section of the Maria Canals International Music Competition, and in 1972 he won third prize in the ARD International Music Competition in Munich. Kovacic plays a violin by Giovanni Battista Guadagnini from 1753.

== New music ==
Kovacic is a performer of new music. Contemporary composers such as Ernst Krenek, Friedrich Cerha, Georg Friedrich Haas, Johannes Maria Staud, Beat Furrer, Robin Holloway, Nigel Osborne, Helmut Eder, Iván Eröd, Gerhard Präsent, Kurt Schwertsik, Karlheinz Essl junior, and others have composed works for him.

== Performance collaborations ==
Kovacic has played with ensembles such as the Northern Sinfonia, Britten Sinfonia, Stuttgart Chamber Orchestra, St Paul Chamber Orchestra, Norwegian Chamber Orchestra, Klangforum Wien, Ensemble Modern, Camerata Salzburg, Camerata Bern and the Deutsche Kammerphilharmonie Bremen. Since 2008, he has been the violinist of the Zebra Trio with Steven Dann and Anssi Karttunen.

== Artistic directorships and festivals ==
From 1996 to 1998 Kovacic was artistic director of the Vienna Chamber Orchestra. He has been artistic director of the Leopoldinum Chamber Orchestra in Wrocław since 2007. Together with Beat Furrer, he directs the Impuls seminars for new music in Graz. He is the programme curator of various festivals, including the Brücken festival in Mürztal in Styria and the Leo Festival in Wrocław, Poland.

== Competition jury member ==
In 2022, Kovacec was a member of the jury for the Fritz Kreisler International Violin Competition.

== Selected recordings ==
- World tour with Fritz Kreisler (Camerata Salzburg), 2001 on Preiser Records
- "Schönberg and Beethoven (Wrocław Chamber Orchestra Leopoldinum), 2010 on CD Accord
- "Ernst Krenek : Symphonic Elegy (Leopoldinum Chamber Orchestra), 2009 at Capriccio
- "Holloway: Ancora (Scottish Chamber Orchestra), 2003 at NMC
- "Jean Sibelius : Early Chamber Music Vol. 1, 1994 on Ondine
- Friedrich Cerha: Violin Concerto, ORF Symphony Orchestra, Conductor: Bertrand de Billy col legno 2006
- Bernhard Stevens : Concerto for Violin and Orchestra & Symphony No. 2 ( BBC Philharmonic Orchestra ), 2009 on Meridian Records
- "José Manuel López López : Concerto para piano y orquesta, Concierto para violín y orquesta and "Movimentos para dos pianos y orquesta (German Symphony Orchestra Berlin), 2009 at KAIROS Music Production
- Witold Ludoslawski : Opera Omnia 03, 2011 on CD Accord
- "The Art of Fugue, 2012 on CD Accord
- Hanna Kulenty Music 4, (Leopoldinum Chamber Orchestra) 2011 at Dux
- "Ernst Krenek Works for Chamber Orchestra, Leopoldinum Chamber Orchestra, 2012 Toccata Classics
