= Aleksi Barrière =

French-Finnish writer and stage director (born 1989)

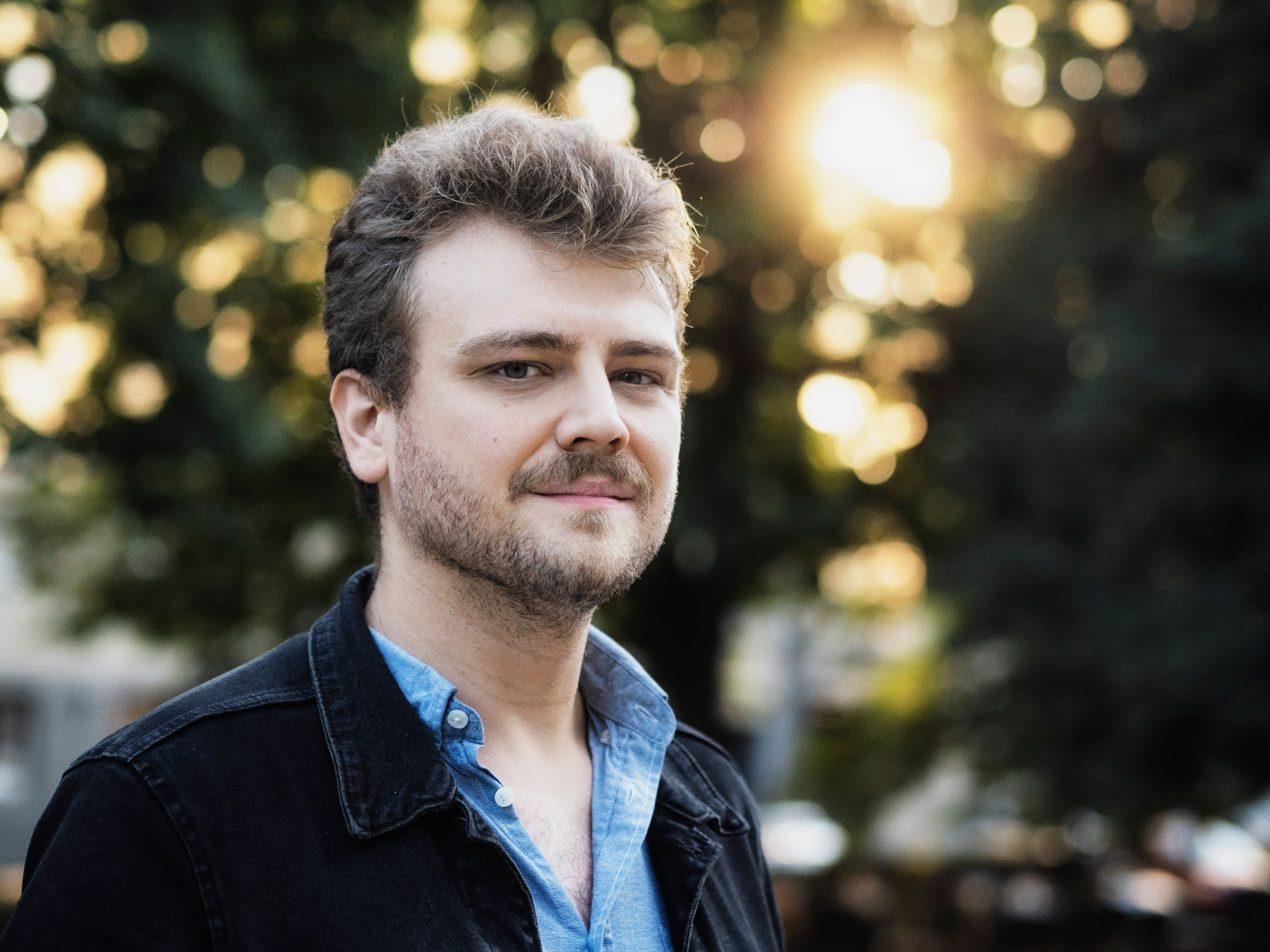
Barrière in Helsinki in 2021

Aleksi Barrière is a French-Finnish writer and stage director born in 1989, known for his work in the field of contemporary music and opera. He was a close collaborator of his mother, Finnish composer Kaija Saariaho, most notably on her final opera Innocence.

== Directing ==
A graduate of the Theatre Faculty of the Academy of Performing Arts in Prague, Barrière is the founder of La Chambre aux échos, a music theatre collective based in Paris. The collective has premiered multiple new works under Barrière's direction and offered new readings of classics of the 20th century, including Igor Stravinsky, Darius Milhaud, Hanns Eisler, Luciano Berio, and Hans Werner Henze. Their performances have been presented to critical acclaim in opera houses and festivals in France, Finland, and multiple other European countries, including at the Finnish National Opera, the Bergen International Festival, and the Venice Music Biennale. La Chambre aux échos has also produced a feature film that is in 2025 in post-production.

Barrière has been a guest director among others at the Hamburg State Opera, Tokyo Bunka Kaikan, Trap Door Theatre in Chicago, and Mannes School of Music, specializing in the creation of new works and considering "collaboration with contemporary composers to be a key element in his work". For Stockholm's Folkoperan he has directed the world premiere of Bogoluchie by Đuro Živković in 2024, praised by Swedish press as "a suggestive and fascinating piece about a broken time".

== Libretti ==
Barrière has written the libretti to multiple operas and musical works, working with composers such as Juha T. Koskinen (including Violences and Earthrise at the Finnish National Opera in 2019 and 2024), Diana Syrse (starting with Connected Identities for the Los Angeles Philharmonic, dubbed "one of the highlights of its CDMX Festival" in 2017), and Outi Tarkiainen (Day of Night, to be premiered at Aalto Theatre in Essen and Finnish National Opera in 2027). His works often take a multilingual form, especially as a tool of intercultural dialogue, and explore contemporary dramaturgies.

He has collaborated on multiple projects with composer Kaija Saariaho, including the song cycle True Fire, the "science-fiction madrigal" Reconnaissance (and multiple other choral works), and the opera Innocence, in which he was involved alongside Sofi Oksanen as co-librettist in charge of the dramaturgy and multilingual libretto. Reconnaissance has been called "a great 21st-century choral piece", "the most important choral work composed on this side of the turn of the millennium", and went on to win a Grammy Award. Innocence, a choral examination of the aftermath of a school shooting, was described as Saariaho's "masterpiece" by The New York Times, and "a monumental achievement, bold and profoundly responsive to contemporary life" by The Guardian.

The influence of Barrière's input has been noted as a major component of Saariaho's last compositional period by scholars. Saariaho's final work, the trumpet concerto HUSH (2023), is based on a text written by Barrière.

== Translations and other work ==
Barrière is the French translator of the collected writings of composer-director Heiner Goebbels, "a reference book that belongs in every library". A specialist of interdisciplinary creation, he has produced academic research on director Peter Sellars, contributed to The Oxford Handbook of Sound and Image in Western Art, lectured on the subject at the University of Chicago and the Académie des Beaux-Arts, and written articles for the Paris Opera, for record labels such as Warner Classics and BIS, and various musical publications.

His translation work into French also includes Jack London's short story "To Build a Fire" in both its versions and a critical edition of two poetry collections by Eeva-Liisa Manner.

== Family ==
Barrière is the son of composers Kaija Saariaho and Jean-Baptiste Barrière.
