= Harp concerto =

Concerto for solo harp and instrumental ensemble

A harp concerto is a type of musical composition composed for a solo harp player accompanied by a large ensemble, such as a concert band or orchestra.

== Notable examples ==
- Elias Parish Alvars
  - Harp Concerto in G minor (Op. 81) (1842)
  - Harp Concerto in E♭ major (Op. 98) (1845)
- Alberto Ginastera
  - Harp Concerto (1956)
- Reinhold Glière
  - Harp Concerto (1938)
- Inglis Gundry
  - Harp Concerto (1973)
- George Frideric Handel
  - Concerto in B♭ major for harp and orchestra, Op. 4, No. 6, HWV 294 (1738)
- Patrick Hawes
  - Highgrove Suite (2010)
- Jennifer Higdon
  - Harp Concerto (2018)
- Anatoliy Kos-Anatolsky
  - Harp Concerto in F minor (1954)
- Wolfgang Amadeus Mozart
  - Concerto for Flute, Harp, and Orchestra, K. 299 (1778)
- Walter Piston
  - Capriccio for Harp and String Orchestra (1963)
- Einojuhani Rautavaara
  - Harp Concerto (2000)
- Henriette Renie
  - Harp concerto in C (1900)
- Joaquín Rodrigo
  - Concierto serenata (1952)
- Nino Rota
  - Concerto per arpa e orchestra (1947)
- Camille Saint-Saëns
  - Morceau de concert for harp and orchestra in G major, Op. 154 (1918)
- Kaija Saariaho
  - Trans (2015)
- Daniel Steibelt
  - Harp Concerto (1807)
- Maurice Thiriet
  - Harp Concerto (1936)
- Heitor Villa-Lobos
  - Harp Concerto (1953)

== See also ==
- List of compositions for harp
