= Petals (composition) =

Petals is a 1988 piece of spectral music composed by Kaija Saariaho for cello and live electronics. It is one of the works studied in the Edexcel syllabus for the A-Level in Music. It has been recorded both by its dedicatee, Anssi Karttunen, on the Finlandia label and by the cellist Wilhelmina Smith on the Ondine label.

== Background ==
In 1982, Saariaho started studying at the Institute de Recherche et Coordination Acoustique/Musical in Paris. She focused her interests on computer-based sound spectrum analysis, electronic music, music combining live performance and electronics and the use of computers in the actual composition of music. Petals was written in 1988 over the course of a few days. It was performed for the first time in Bremen, by the Finnish cellist Anssi Karttunen.

Petals mixes live and electronically processed sounds. The piece plays around with the contrasts between instrumental and electronic/recorded sound and with the expansion of the natural sounds made by conventional instruments so that they can sound like electronics. Petals is deeply inspired by one of her other pieces, Nymphea (Jardin Secret III) (1987) for string quartet and electronics. The name of the piece was derived from this relationship.

== Instrumentation and technique ==
Petals can be performed as a solo for cello uniquely, or with electronic amplification and signal processing. By composing two opposite modes of expression in this piece, Saariaho wants to force the interpreter to stretch their sensibility. The cello writing in this piece uses a variety of different instrumental techniques:

- Normal, sul ponticello, sul tasto, tremolando and flautando bowed playing
- Different bow pressure
- Pizzicato and left-hand pizzicato
- Three different types of glissandi
- Different types of vibrato
- Harmonics
- Trills and mordents
- Double stopping

== Electronics ==
The optional use of the suggested amplification/signal processing set-up clarifies some aspects in regards to the solo cello version. Three main techniques are used in this work:

- Amplification
- Reverberation
- Harmoniser

== Structure ==
Petals does not consist of a fixed structure. The score is presented in a one-stave-per-line layout. This piece relies on two opposite themes which organize it into two contrasting sections: fragile coloristic passages and more energetic events with clear rhythmic and melodic character. The coloristic sections are marked with tempo lento and sempre legatissimo; have harmonics, glissandos and trills; the dynamics are quieter; have long note values and bow pressure is used. On the other hand, the more energetic sections have a higher number of bpm; have microtonal and chromatic runs; have louder dynamics; shorter note values; are rhythmically very complex and make greater use of reverb and harmoniser effects.

== Texture ==
Petals uses three types of textures:

- Monophonic textures
- Two-part textures
- Pedal/Drone textures

== Tonality ==
Kaija Saariaho's intentions did not revolve around pitch organisation in this piece, therefore it is atonal. However, in absence of a key, the idea of a tonic can be heard in some areas of the piece. For example, a low C becomes the center to the ear throughout the staves 17-27.

== Melody ==
Themes and melodic motives aren't used in this piece, however, there are some noticeable features that develop some melodic ideas:

- Microtonal intervals- specifically quarter-tones
- Retrogades
- Sequences

== Rhythm, metre and tempo ==
Tempo is varied throughout the piece and is marked by the terms accelerandi and ritenuti. Some sections have notated tempo, for example 60 bpm during some energetic passages. The lento passages are pulseless, hence, creating contrast between the sections where pulse is evident and the ones where it is not. Dectuplets, syncopations between septuplets and quintuplets and grace notes are used in the metrically active sections. Overall, the rhythms becomes less established along the course of the piece.
