= Clarinet Concerto (Lindberg) =

Composition by Magnus Lindberg

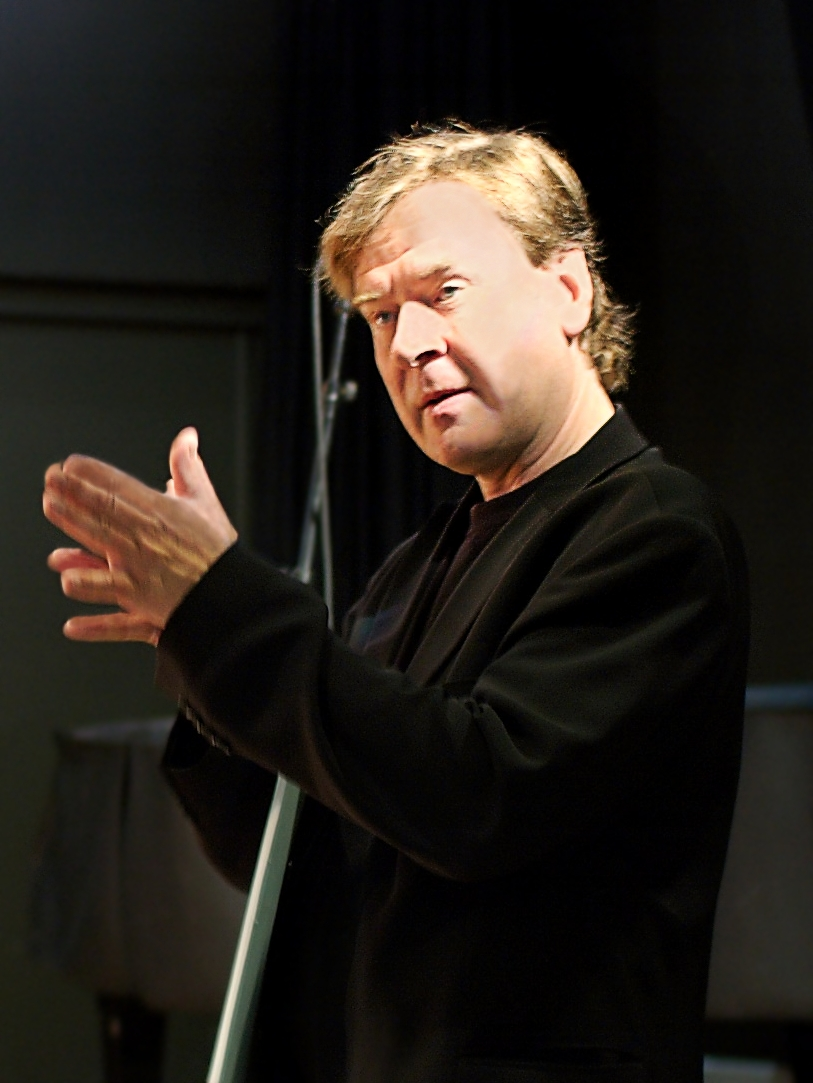
Magnus Lindberg in 2006

The Clarinet Concerto is a composition for solo clarinet and orchestra by the Finnish composer Magnus Lindberg. It was written for the Finnish clarinetist Kari Kriikku. The piece was given its world premiere in Finlandia Hall, Helsinki, on September 14, 2002 by Kari Kriikku and the Finnish Radio Symphony Orchestra under the direction of Jukka-Pekka Saraste. The composition is one of Lindberg's most frequently performed works.

== Composition ==
The concerto is composed in a single movement divided into five sections and has a duration of roughly 28 minutes. It was composed between 2001 and 2002.

=== Instrumentation ===
The work is composed for solo clarinet and a large orchestra comprising two flutes (2nd doubling piccolo), two oboes, cor anglais, two clarinets, bass clarinet, two bassoons (2nd doubling contrabassoon), four horns, three trumpets (3rd doubling piccolo trumpet), three trombones, tuba, timpani, two percussionists, piano (doubling celesta), and strings.

== Reception ==
The concerto has been highly praised by music critics. Calum MacDonald of BBC Music Magazine wrote, "A marvellous vehicle for the amazing virtuosity of clarinettist Kari Krikku, this is a shiny, sophisticated, nostalgic cultural artefact, indubitably contemporary in language yet sensuously easy (tuneful, even) on the ear. It's unafraid to wear its heart on its sleeve; except a tiny doubt subsists whether it has a heart at all, or is just a dazzlingly calculated piece by one of the biggest talents around." Andrew Clements of The Guardian similarly observed, "It is that rare thing, a piece written by one of the leading European composers of our time that manages to be unfailingly approachable and rewarding without making any compromises in its musical language or technique." Rick Schultz of the Los Angeles Times called it "a brilliant blend of traditional and contemporary techniques." Jay Nordlinger The New Criterion further remarked:

Lindberg’s clarinet concerto is in one movement with five sections. Solo instrument and orchestra are strikingly well integrated. The work is rhapsodic, tumultuous, restless. There is lots of percussion, this being a modern work, but the percussion is not without purpose. And the concerto is genuinely exciting, not merely frenetic. The listener occasionally needs a break, a spell of more soothing music, and he gets it: There is a Christmassy stretch, I dare say, even a dose of the Disneyesque. It’s hard to tell whether the composer is mocking or in earnest. He has the clarinet make every sound it can, and probably some it should not. And it was amazing—surprising—to see that the work ends in a warm C major.
