= ...à la Fumée =

Symphonic composition by Kaija Saariaho

...à la Fumée (...Into Smoke) is a symphonic composition by Kaija Saariaho written in 1990, at the age of 38. It is a sequel to her 1989-90 work Du Cristal..., and starts where it ends, with a violoncello solo long trill sul ponticello. Both compositions form the title From Glass Into Smoke, inspired by Henri Atlan's 1979 essay Entre le cristal et la fumée: Essai sur l'organisation de vivant. Unlike Du Cristal..., ...à la Fumée features two soloists, a flute and a cello, which are distorted electronically. Lasting circa 18 minutes, it was premiered in Helsinki on 20 March 1991 by flutist Petri Alanko, cellist Anssi Karttunen and the Finnish Radio Symphony conducted by Esa-Pekka Salonen.

== Discography ==
- Petri Alanko, Anssi Karttunen; Los Angeles Philharmonic – Esa-Pekka Salonen. Ondine, 1993.
