= Sept Papillons =

Composition by Kaija Saariaho

- by Kaija Saariaho
- Period: Contemporary
- Composed: 2000
- Dedication: Anssi Karttunen
- Duration: ca. 10 minutes
- Movements: Seven
- Scoring: Solo cello

Premiere
- Date: 10 September 2000
- Location: Helsinki, Finland
- Performers: Anssi Karttunen

Sept Papillons (French for "Seven Butterflies") is a piece for solo cello by Finnish composer Kaija Saariaho. The piece was commissioned by the Rudolf Steiner Foundation and was premiered on 10 September 2000 by Anssi Karttunen, to whom the piece is dedicated.

== Background and composition ==
Sept Papillons was the first piece that Saariaho wrote after completing her opera L'Amour de loin. She stated that in writing it, she wanted to depart from the musical world of L'Amour de loin to move "to a metaphor of the ephemeral: butterfly". As the title suggests, the piece is made up of seven miniatures, simply entitled "Papillon I", "Papillon II", and so on. The piece lasts about 10 minutes in total.

Sept Papillons was commissioned by the Rudolf Steiner Foundation, and was premiered by Anssi Karttunen in Helsinki, Finland, on 10 September 2000. Saariaho also dedicated the piece to Karttunen, with whom she became friends after they both moved to Paris in the early 1980s.

== Reception ==
The piece has been praised for its use of extended techniques for the cello, such as harmonics, variable bow pressure, and sul ponticello. Its use of melody has also been discussed in an article by James Donaldson. It has been celebrated as one of Saariaho's best works.
