= Innocence (opera) =

2021 opera in five acts by Kaija Saariaho

- Opera by Kaija Saariaho
- Librettist: Sofi Oksanen, translated and adapted by Aleksi Barrière
- Language: English, Finnish, Czech, French, Romanian, Swedish, German, Spanish, Greek
- Premiere: 3 July 2021; Aix-en-Provence Festival

Innocence is an opera in five acts by the Finnish composer Kaija Saariaho. The libretto was written in Finnish by Sofi Oksanen and translated/adapted by Aleksi Barrière.

The opera was co-commissioned by the Aix-en-Provence Festival, the Dutch National Opera, the Finnish National Opera, and the San Francisco Opera. It received its world premiere on 3 July 2021 at the Aix-en-Provence Festival, conducted by Susanna Mälkki and directed by Simon Stone.

The opera tells the intertwined stories of a wedding in 2000s Helsinki and a school shooting ten years earlier, and has been described as a thriller.

== Plot ==
The opera, set in 21st century Helsinki, tells the intertwined stories of the wedding of Tuomas and Stela and a school shooting ten years earlier which killed ten students and one teacher. Before long, it is revealed that the shooter, who has recently been released, was Tuomas's brother. The groom's family has withheld this information from Stela, however, wishing to distance themselves from the event. Tereza, a waitress who was called to work the wedding at the last minute, overhears a conversation about Tuomas's brother; she is the mother of one of the shooting victims, Markéta, who appears throughout the opera as a ghost.

The events of the wedding reception are interspersed with scenes from the school, narrated by the teacher. While all the characters at the wedding are cast as opera singers, the students are all "musical actors", separating them into what Saariaho and Oksanen refer to as "the realm of memories". The shooter is never represented onstage, however, with the opera instead focusing on the aftermath of the tragedy and its effect on the victims.

Throughout the opera, the involvement of the students and of Tuomas in the tragedy is explored. The students' memories reveal that Markéta and others constantly bullied the shooter. One student, Iris, who was a friend of the shooter, pushes back against the others' delusion that this bullying had nothing to do with the shooting; she blames them all for the tragedy.

Tereza eventually breaks her silence, lashing out at Tuomas's mother and demanding an explanation. The family is then forced to explain the tragedy to Stela, who, to their surprise, is prepared to forgive Tuomas. Tuomas, however, explains that he feels personally responsible for the tragedy and unable to escape his past, and so decides to leave Stela. He reveals that he, his brother, and Iris conspired together to plan the shooting, but at the decisive moment Tuomas and Iris got cold feet and the shooter carried out the plan alone, taking full responsibility. The opera concludes with Markéta singing to Tereza plaintively, comforting her and asking her to move on.

== Roles ==
Each character sings in their native language (Finnish, Czech, French, Romanian, Swedish, German, Spanish, or Greek), with communication between characters occurring in English. The role of Markéta, specified merely as a "folk singer" in the score, includes Finnish cow-herding calls and improvised cadenzas. The role was created for and in collaboration with Vilma Jää, a Finno-Ugric folk singer and researcher of herding songs who sang the role in many of the early productions.

Roles, voice types, premiere casts of three versions
Role	Language	Voice type	Premiere cast
The Waitress (Tereza)	Czech	mezzo-soprano	Magdalena Kožená
The Bride (Stela)	Romanian	lyric soprano	Lilian Farahani
The Mother-In-Law (Patricia)	French	coloratura soprano	Sandrine Piau
The Bridegroom (Tuomas)	Finnish/French	tenor	Markus Nykänen
The Father-In-Law (Henrik)	Finnish	baritone	Tuomas Pursio
The Priest	Finnish	bass-baritone	Jukka Rasilainen
The Teacher (Cecilia)	English	singer	Lucy Shelton
Student 1 (Markéta)	Czech/Finnish	folk singer	Vilma Jää
Student 2 (Lilly)	Swedish	singing actor	Beate Mordal
Student 3 (Iris)	French	actor	Julie Hega
Student 4 (Anton)	German	actor	Simon Kluth
Student 5 (Jerónimo)	Spanish	actor	Camilo Delgado Díaz
Student 6 (Alexia)	Greek	actor	Marina Dumont

== Instrumentation ==
The piece is scored for the following orchestra:

Woodwinds

3 flutes (1st and 2nd doubling piccolo, 3rd doubling alto flute)
3 oboes
3 clarinets (3rd doubling bass clarinet)
3 bassoons (3rd doubling contrabassoon)

Brass

4 horns
2 trumpets
3 trombones
1 tuba

Percussion

timpani

Percussion 1: glockenspiel, crotales, 2 woodblocks, suspended cymbal (small), bass drum, maracas, tom-tom

Percussion 2: vibraphone, xylophone, tom-tom, frame drum, snare drum, wood chimes, suspended cymbal (medium)

Percussion 3: marimba, crotales, tam-tam, 2 suspended cymbals (small, large), snare drum, large frame drum, triangle, cowbell, cabasa

Percussion 4: tubular bells, bass drum, snare drum, slit drum, glass chimes, triangle, guiro, woodblock, small finger cymbal with triangle beater, Chinese tom-tom, sizzle cymbal with chain, suspended cymbal (large), bell tree

Keyboards

piano
celesta

Strings

harp

violins I
violins II
violas
cellos
double basses

== Performances ==
Innocence received its premiere on 3 July 2021 at the Aix-en-Provence Festival, with Susanna Mälkki conducting the London Symphony Orchestra and the Estonian Philharmonic Chamber Choir, and directed by Simon Stone. The production was subsequently performed in October–November 2022 at the Finnish National Opera, in April–May 2023 at the Royal Opera House, in October 2023 at the Dutch National Opera,, in June 2024 at San Francisco Opera. It was the headline opera of the 2025 Adelaide Festival, conducted by Clément Mao-Takacs and performed by State Opera South Australia, Adelaide Chamber Singers and the Adelaide Symphony Orchestra, and in March 2025 at the Semperoper in Dresden for its German premiere.

In 2022, the Metropolitan Opera House in New York City announced that they would present Stone's production of the opera. Shortly after Saariaho's death in June 2023, they announced that it would be part of their 2025–2026 season. Upon its first performance there, on 6 April 2026, Saariaho became the first female composer ever to have two operas staged at the Met, after L'Amour de loin, in 2016, the second opera by a woman performed there.

== Reception ==
Innocence has been received well by critics, with Zachary Woolfe of The New York Times calling it Saariaho's "masterpiece". In a five-star review of the opera's London production for The Telegraph, Nicholas Kenyon also referred to the opera as a "modern masterpiece". Richard Morrison of The Times gave the opera four stars, calling it a "visceral, volatile thriller" and commenting on the opera's topicality.

Andrew Clements reviewed the opera somewhat less favorably, giving it three stars in The Guardian. Clements praised the libretto, the production, and the "unfailingly beautiful" orchestral music, but opined that the music (particularly the vocal writing) failed to match the heights of the drama.

Vilma Jää's performance as Markéta, and Saariaho's use of Finnish folk singing techniques for the role, have been particularly praised.

Mälkki has described the work as "one of the most important works of our time", while Simon Rattle compared its importance to that of Alban Berg's Wozzeck.
