= Laterna Magica (composition) =

Laterna Magica (The Magic Lantern) is an orchestral composition by the Finnish composer Kaija Saariaho. The work was commissioned by the Berlin Philharmonic and the Lucerne Festival. Its world premiere was given by the Berlin Philharmonic under the direction of Simon Rattle at the Berliner Philharmonie on August 28, 2009.

== Composition ==
Laterna Magica has a duration of approximately 20 minutes and is cast in a single continuous movement.

=== Background ===
The title of the piece comes from an eponymous autobiography by the Swedish film director Ingmar Bergman. The book caught Saariaho's attention after many years while she was cleaning a bookshelf in August 2007. In the score program note, she wrote, "In time, as I read the book, the variation of musical motifs at different tempos emerged as one of the basic ideas behind the orchestral piece on which I was beginning to work. Symbolising this was the Laterna Magica, the first machine to create the illusion of a moving image: as the handle turns faster and faster, the individual images disappear and instead the eye sees continuous movement." In an interview with Georgia Rowe of the San Jose Mercury News, she further remarked, "He had gotten it as a birthday gift, and he writes of the miracle that happened when he made it go quicker and quicker, until it finally became a moving image. I liked that metaphor: It made me think of different tempi and how we perceive musical material."

Saariaho was also moved by the way Bergman described the different lights captured by his favorite cinematographer Sven Nykvist. The composer incorporated these words into the piece, which are whispered in German by members of the orchestra. In English, the words read, "Gentle, dangerous, dream-like, lively, dead, clear, hazy, hot, strong, naked, sudden, dark, spring-like, penetrating, pressing, direct, oblique, sensuous, overpowering, restricting, poisonous, pacifying, bright light. Light."

=== Instrumentation ===
The work is scored for a large orchestra consisting of three flutes (3rd doubling piccolo and alto flute), three oboes, three clarinets, two bassoons (2nd doubling contrabassoon), six horns, four trumpets, three trombones, tuba, two timpanists, three percussionists, harp, celesta, piano, and strings.

== Reception ==
Joshua Kosman of the San Francisco Chronicle wrote, "'Ingratiating' is a surprising way to describe a work by a composer whose language is often abstract, even austere. Yet Laterna Magica, which draws both its title and some narrative inspiration from the autobiography of the Swedish director Ingmar Bergman, is packed with arresting and oddball inventions." Joe Cadagin of the San Francisco Classical Voice remarked, "In an almost cinematographic manner, Saariaho depicts shifting lighting effects by juxtaposing blocks of sound dominated by various tone colors and acoustic effects similar to Berlioz' use of harmonics. At certain points, the horns emerge in a kind of drooping chorale meant to symbolize the color red. Wind chimes and celeste sparkled on the surface of a shimmering string halo, which required the string section to play almost at the point of inaudibility." Despite this praise, Cadagin said it "nonetheless seemed to lack a clear trajectory" and wrote, "Rather than working together, the two sides of the work make it feel confusingly split — should we sink into the hazy, light-inspired timbres or run with the pounding ostinati? While there are some beautiful moments, Saariaho often gets too absorbed in pure sonic beauty and the orchestral tone colors she has generated."
