= Tuija Hakkila =

Finnish musician

Tuija Hakkila (born 16 January 1959) is a Finnish classical pianist. She studied at the Sibelius Academy and at the Conservatoire de Paris with Jacques Rouvier.

She has performed as soloist, in chamber groups and as accompanist. She is regularly invited to the United States of America, France, Japan, Indonesia, Africa and South America. Tuija Hakkila has recorded several CD, for instance the complete cycle of Mozart keyboard sonatas and a recording with Kaija Saariaho’s chamber music for trio ensembles.

She is also a piano teacher (Professor since 2014) at the Sibelius Academy and an artistic director of music festivals in Finland.
