= Trans (Saariaho composition) =

Harp concerto by Kaija Saariaho

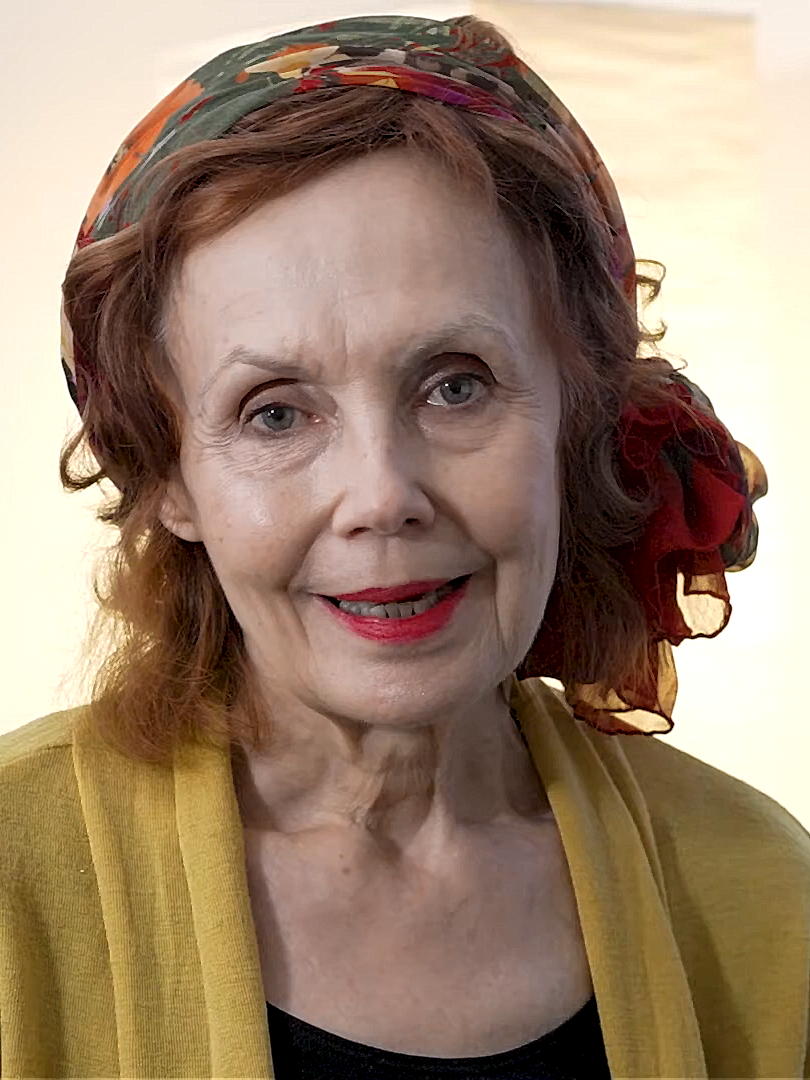
Kaija Saariaho in 2022

Trans is a harp concerto written in 2015 by the Finnish composer Kaija Saariaho. The work was commissioned by the Suntory Foundation for Arts, the Finnish Radio Symphony Orchestra, the Swedish Radio Symphony Orchestra, Tonhalle-Orchester Zürich, Radio France, and the Frankfurt Radio Symphony. The world premiere was performed by the harpist Xavier de Maistre and the Tokyo Symphony Orchestra conducted by Ernest Martínez Izquierdo at Suntory Hall, Tokyo.

== Composition ==
Trans has a duration of roughly 20 minutes and is cast in three movements:

1. Fugitif
2. Vanité
3. Messager

=== Instrumentation ===
The work is scored for a solo harp and an orchestra comprising two flutes (2nd doubling piccolo), oboe, two clarinet, bassoon, four horns, trumpet, two trombones, tuba, timpani, three percussionists, and strings.

== Reception ==
The music critic Steve Moffatt of Limelight praised Trans, remarking that "[Saariaho] skilfully manages a score which never drowns out the harp but preserves the rich orchestral polyphony." Andrew Mellor of Gramophone gave the piece a more lukewarm review, writing, "Saariaho was fascinated by the instrument but her gestural language is relatively small, favouring downward glissandos and cyclic finger-picking," while adding that "[t]he dark corners of the second movement's ('Vanité') orchestral hinterland take us to a more interesting place."

== See also ==
- List of compositions by Kaija Saariaho
