= Maan varjot =

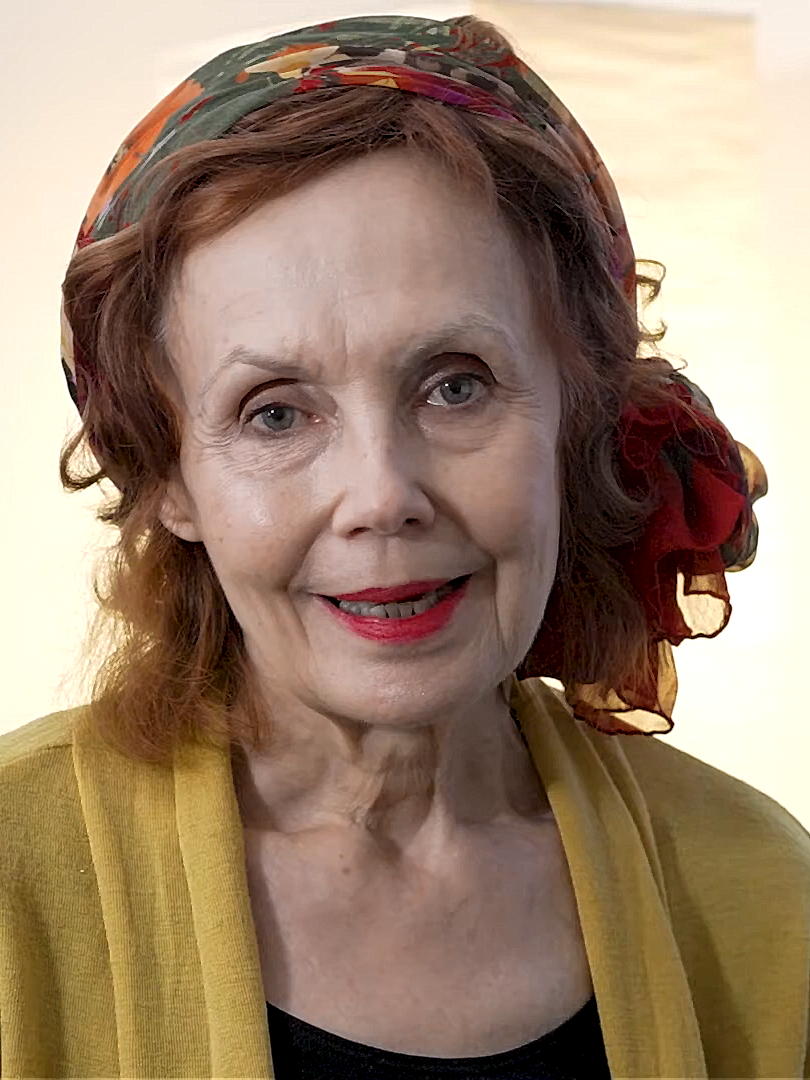
Kaija Saariaho in 2022

Maan varjot (Earth's Shadows) is a composition for solo organ and orchestra by the Finnish composer Kaija Saariaho. The work was jointly commissioned by the Montreal Symphony Orchestra, the Orchestre national de Lyon, Southbank Centre, and the Philharmonia Orchestra. It was first performed in Montreal on May 29, 2014, by the organist Olivier Latry and the Montreal Symphony Orchestra under the conductor Kent Nagano.

== Composition ==
Maan varjot has a duration of approximately 15 minutes and is composed in three numbered movements. Saariaho described the work in the score program notes, writing:

The organ and orchestra are side-by-side as two rich and powerful "instruments" with several common factors which make it easy to create connections between them. But more than the common features, I am interested in the aspects which separate the instruments and give them their own particular identity. For example, the orchestra has a great flexibility which comes from the ability to create micro-tonality, glissandos, rich textures with instrumental noises or delicate multi-layered dynamics. The organ, on the other hand, has the ability to produce rich and very precise textures controlled by only one musician, as well as long sustained notes without the constraints of breathing or the length of a bow. Unlike some other instruments, the organ doesn't need to fight to rise above the orchestra; it can do it any time, effortlessly. But I didn't want to create a duel of decibels, and I don't consider this piece an organ concerto. Rather, it is a work with a prominent solo organ part, some kind of a fruitful and inspiring companionship, in which two strong but civilised personalities can co-exist without having to fight too much for the place in the sun.

The title of the piece comes from Percy Bysshe Shelley's 1821 poem Adonaïs (an elegy to John Keats) and was chosen in memory of the composer's father.

=== Instrumentation ===
The work is scored for solo organ and an orchestra comprising piccolo, two flutes (2nd doubling alto flute), two oboes, cor anglais, two clarinets, E-flat clarinet, two bassoons, four horns, two trumpets, three trombones, tuba, timpani, three percussionists, harp, and strings.

== Reception ==
Maan varjot has received a positive response from music critics. Mark Swed of the Los Angeles Times wrote, "This may not be exactly a return on her part to her organ roots, but the electric energy she brings to the timbre of the organ as well as to the orchestra is a reminder not just of where she came from but also how far she has come." He added, "The central movement held the most earthly colors, the grays and browns of the metallic elements and of the soil. Lush melody found a voice. But radiance again rose in the final section, a mirage of sound effects." Hannah Nepil of the Financial Times also lauded the piece, writing, "Maan varjot is a sophisticated example of Saariaho's work; its shimmering textures and gliding harmonies seem to come from a galaxy far beyond our own, evoking a reel of cinematic images. For large sections, we could be at the bottom of an ocean, in a world of rippling, mysterious shapes and shadows. Then we come up for air to hear what sounds like parts of Messiaen's Turangalîla Symphony put through a blender. Only at this point does the organ let out a real roar, a moment savoured by Latry." Jim Farber of the San Francisco Classical Voice declared it a "superb example" of Saariaho's music, opining, "At times the organ blends into the orchestral fabric as a rumbling, pulsing, growling presence. Then like a magma pool no longer under restraint, it bursts forth in eruptive crescendos of full-voiced magnitude causing tectonic shifts in the orchestral landscape."

Conversely, Andrew Clements of The Guardian called the work "a curious piece" and remarked, "The three movements flit in and out of focus, and the solo writing seems to reference a century's worth of the organ repertoire from Franck, through Reger, to Messiaen and Langlais. Even the Festival Hall's clinical acoustic couldn't really resolve the shifting sonorities of the opening section, and the ambiguities between the microtonal writing for the orchestra and the well-tempered pitches of the organ don't really register as they should."
