= Trap Door Theatre =

American theatre company

- Formation: 1990
- Type: Theatre group
- Location: Chicago, Illinois, United States
- Artistic director: Beata Pilch
- Website: trapdoortheatre.com

Trap Door Theatre is an avant-garde theatre company based in Chicago, United States. Its focus is on European and original experimental material.

== History ==
Trap Door Theatre, founded by Beata Pilch and Sean Marlow, was incorporated in 1990 as a nomadic company touring theatre in Stockholm, Berlin, Zakopane, and Paris. In 1994, Trap Door brought its European tradition to the United States, creating a permanent home for the company in Chicago.

Trap Door Theatre is located in Bucktown in Chicago in a 900-square-foot (84 m^{2}) converted performance space which seats 45.

== Ensemble ==
- Maryam Abdi
- Venice Averyheart
- Dennis Bisto
- Abby Blankenship
- Marzena Bukowska
- Holly T. Cerney
- Gary Damico
- Bill Gordon
- David A. Holcombe
- John Kahara
- Lyndsay Rose Kane
- Anna Klos
- Emily Lotspeich
- Miguel Long
- David Lovejoy (Associate Managing Director)
- Leslie Lund
- Michael Mejia (Company Manager)
- Emily Nichelson
- Beata Pilch (Artistic Director, Co-Founder)
- Chris Popio
- Manuela Rentea
- Ann Sonneville
- Keith Surney
- Nicole Wiesner (Managing Director)
- Bob Wilson
- Carl Wisniewski
- Max Truax (Resident Director)
- Kate Hendrickson (Resident Director)
- Richard Norwood (Resident Light Designer)
- Danny Rockett (Resident Sound Designer)
- Zsófia Ötvös (Resident Makeup Artist)
- Rachel Sypniewski (Resident Costume Designer)
- Milan Pribisic (Resident Dramaturg)
- Michal Janicki (Resident Graphic Designer)

Honorary members include Tiffany Bedwell, Danny Belrose, Antonio Brunetti, Summer Chance, Dani Deac, Ewelina Dobiesz, Kristie Hassinger, Sean Marlow (Co-Founder), Kim McKean, Catherine Sullivan, Andrew Cooper Wasser, Michael Garvey, Bob Rokos, Tiffany Joy Ross, Wesley Walker, Michael S. Pieper, and Krishna Le Fan.

== Notable productions ==
- How to Explain The History of Communism to Mental Patients (March 2016, Romania: May 2016)
- La Bête (March 2015)
- First Ladies (March 2011)
- Beholder (May 2008)
- Nana (December 2002)
- Lebensraum (March 2000)
- Porcelain (March 2001)
- Beholder (May 2008)
- Emma (October 2007)
- The Bitter Tears of Petra Von Kant (September 2006)
- Old Clown Wanted (New York: November 2005; Chicago: November 2005; Romania: May 2007)
- My Liver is Senseless
- AmeriKafka
- The Crazy Locomotive (New York: August 2005; Chicago: June 2005; Romania: May 2007)
- Horses at the Window (March 2009 Romania: May 2009 Virginia, New York: November 2009)
- Me Too, I am Catherine Deneuve (October 2010 Georgia, December 2010 Washington DC, April 2011 France, April 2012)

== Awards and honors ==
Joseph Jefferson Award citations

- Best Original Music (Danny Rockett, How to Explain the History of Communism to Mental Patients)
- Best Actor in a Principal Role (Kevin Cox, La Bête)
- Best Costume Design (Rachel Sypniewski, La Bête)
- Best Original Incidental Music (Ovidiu Iloc, The Word Progress on my Mother’s Lips Doesn’t Ring True)
- Best Actress in a Principal Role (Nicole Wiesner, First Ladies)
- Best New Work (Ken Prestininzi, Beholder)
- Best Ensemble (Nana)
- Best Supporting Actress (Sharon Gopfert, Lebensraum)
- Best Supporting Actor (Eric Johnson, Lebensraum)
- Best Ensemble (Lebensraum)
- Best Ensemble (Porcelain)
