= Hush (Saariaho) =

Trumpet concerto by Kaija Saariaho

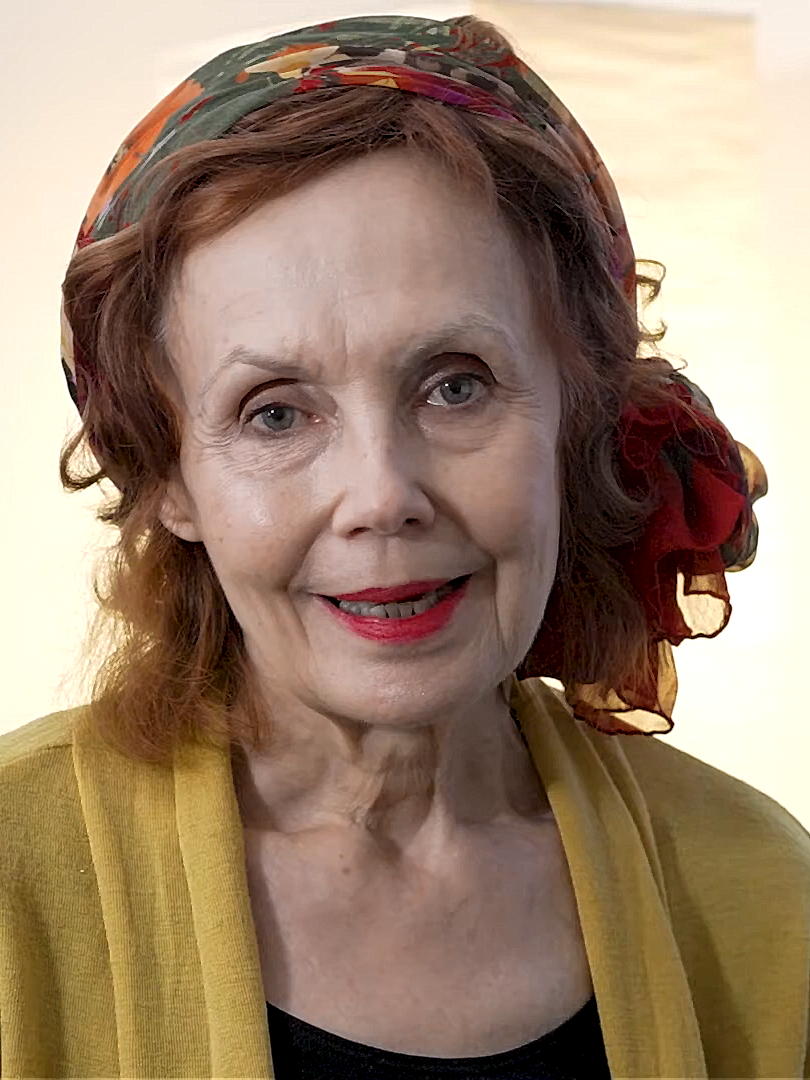
Kaija Saariaho in 2022

The 2023 trumpet concerto Hush (stylized HUSH) is the last completed work by Kaija Saariaho. It was premiered on 24 August 2023 in Helsinki under Susanna Mälkki and with trumpeter Verneri Pohjola.

== Background ==
Saariaho had been diagnosed in February 2021 with glioblastoma, an aggressive brain tumor. The concerto was written during the final stages of her illness. Saariaho was able to complete her final work before she died at the age of 70 in on 2 June 2023. The opus was written for the trumpeter Verneri Pohjola.

The concerto was commissioned by Finnish Radio Symphony Orchestra, Helsinki Festival, Orchestre Philharmonique de Radio France, Los Angeles Philharmonic, Asko|Schönberg, Muziekgebouw aan 't IJ, BBC Radio 3, Lahti Symphony Orchestra and Finnland-Institut. The work was published by Chester Music.

== Structure ==
The concerto is in four movements and lasts 25 minutes.

1. Make the thin air sing
2. Dream of falling
3. What ails you?
4. Ink the silence

Saariaho cites the trumpet parts from her first concerto, Graal Théâtre (1994) for violin and orchestra. The text Not a Knight is from her son Aleksi Barrière.

The first movement is an exposition of the entire material. In the second movement, trumpet glissandi express Saariaho's dreams. The third movement refers to the monthly MRI scans, glissandi and overpressured noises lead to a cadence with shouting. The last movement, Ink the silence, is an "accompanied trumpet solo moving forward through an orchestral landscape".

The trumpet breathes, hums, screams and sings.

== Orchestration ==
Solo trumpet, two flutes doubling piccolo and alto flute, two oboes, English horn, two clarinets, bass clarinet, two bassoons doubling double bassoon, four horns, timpani, three percussion, celesta and strings.

== Performances ==
The premiere took place on 24 August 2023 at Helsinki Music Centre, Helsinki with Verneri Pohjola and the Finnish Radio Symphony Orchestra conducted by Susanna Mälkki.

Further performances:

- 2 and 4 September 2024: Verneri Pohjola, trumpet, Staatskapelle Berlin, Susanna Mälkki, Staatsoper, Berlin
- 24 January 2025: Pohjola, BBC Symphony Orchestra, Sakari Oramo, Barbican Hall, London
- 30 January 2025 to 2 February 2025: Pohjola, Los Angeles Philharmonic, Susanna Mälkki
- 13 February 2026: Pohjola, Orchestre Philharmonique de Radio France, Sakari Oramo, Philharmonie de Paris, Paris
- 9 October 2026: Pohjola, Symphonieorchester des Bayerischen Rundfunks, Matthias Pintscher, Herkulessaal, Munich
- 15 October 2026: Pohjola, Stavanger Symphony Orchestra, Matthew Halls, Stavanger Konserthus, Stavanger
- 22 and 23 October 2026: Pohjola, hr-Sinfonieorchester, Susanna Mälkki, Alte Oper, Frankfurt

== Reception ==
Jari Kallio wrote: "premiere of flickering intensity." Elena Luporini wrote in Bachtrack: "Work of farewell", Nordische Botschaften wrote: "Music composed in the certainty of one's own death, an existential piece."
