= Notes on Light =

Notes on Light is a cello concerto by the Finnish composer Kaija Saariaho. The work was commissioned by the Boston Symphony Orchestra and was first performed at Symphony Hall, Boston on February 22, 2007, by the cellist Anssi Karttunen and the Boston Symphony Orchestra under the conductor Jukka-Pekka Saraste.

== Composition ==
Notes on Light has a duration of roughly 28 minutes and is composed in five movements:

1. Translucent, secret
2. On fire
3. Awakening
4. Eclipse
5. Heart of Light

=== Instrumentation ===
The work is scored for solo cello and an orchestra comprising four flutes (3rd and 4th doubling piccolo and alto flute), two oboes, two clarinets, bass clarinet, two bassoons (2nd doubling contrabassoon), four horns, timpani, four percussionists, harp, celesta, piano, and strings.

== Reception ==
Jeremy Eichler of The Boston Globe, reviewing the world premiere writes: "At work from the start is Saariaho's sensitive ear and highly individual feel for orchestral color, later enhanced by bright splashes of percussion. ... The solo cello, often in stratospheric registers, volleys passionately with the orchestra. Saariaho uses many of her signature extended techniques, including notes purposefully crushed with the bow until they resemble noise." Anthony Tommasini of The New York Times writes about a New York performance: "Though the work is ominous and searching over all, there are strongly contrasting sections, as in the second movement, which erupts into spiraling orchestra riffs and fitful cello outbursts. As always in a Saariaho score, color is primary...", Jochem Valkenburg of NRC Handelsblad in Amsterdam writes about a performance with the Royal Concertgebouw Orchestra: "Saariaho is a wizard with sounds - within three notes, she places the listener in a magical glittering world of sound... These "erratic" tones are characteristic of the piece, and of Saariaho's work in general: not one note is simple - they slide away stretching or volatilising into harmonics."

Reviewing a recording of Notes on Light with Saariaho's Orion, Tim Ashley of The Guardian modestly praised the pieces as "securely done, though both are soft-centred works that throb and thrum appealingly, but lack the underlying toughness of Saariaho's best music." David Fanning of Gramophone similarly opined that it "feels just a fraction long for its material".

Reviewing a performance of Notes on Light for reduced orchestra, Allan Ulrich of the Financial Times writes, "...the soloist broods, rejoices, rhapsodises, laments and establishes a formal contour with a pair of recurring intervals. The descriptive movement titles provide a guide through the work. But this is music that appeals as much to the senses as the intellect." Rebecca Wishnia of the San Francisco Classical Voice said it "develops this orchestral writing to even greater heights" and wrote:

The same restrained touch Saariaho uses in The Tempest Songbook characterizes this work, but because more instruments are involved (in addition to strings, winds, and brass, the 19-person orchestra includes celesta, piano, harp, percussionists, and timpani) the coloristic combinations snowball. The unfolding gesture that closes the third movement and the pulsations of the fourth movement, in particular, are unforgettable. If The Tempest Songbook is too uniform, Notes on Light explodes with contrast; it would take many listens to fully appreciate all that this piece has to offer.
