= Circle Map =

Composition by Kaija Saariaho

For the circle of lands, see T and O map.

Circle Map is a composition for orchestra and electronics by the Finnish composer Kaija Saariaho. The work was jointly commissioned by the Royal Concertgebouw Orchestra, the Boston Symphony Orchestra, the Gothenburg Symphony Orchestra, the Orchestre National de France, the Royal Scottish National Orchestra, and the Stavanger Symphony Orchestra. It was first performed at the Holland Festival in Gashouder, Amsterdam on June 22, 2012, by the Royal Concertgebouw Orchestra under the conductor Susanna Mälkki.

== Composition ==
Circle Map has a duration of 26 minutes and is composed in six movements:

1. Morning Wind
2. Walls closing
3. Circles
4. Days are Sieves
5. Dialogue
6. Day and Night, Music

The electronic element of the work features a recording of Arshia Cont reading the writings of the 13th-century poet and theologian Rumi. The six movements of the piece are thus titled after Rumi's poems, translated to English by John Moyne and Coleman Barks from the book Unseen Rain: Quatrains of Rumi.

=== Instrumentation ===
The work is scored for a large orchestra comprising two flutes (doubling piccolo and alto flute), two oboes, three clarinets (doubling bass clarinet), two bassoons (doubling contrabassoon, four horns, two trumpets, three trombones, tuba, timpani, four percussionists, piano, harp, celesta, strings, and electronics.

== Reception ==
Reviewing the North American premiere in Boston by Juanjo Mena and the Boston Symphony Orchestra, Jeremy Eichler of The Boston Globe regarded Circle Map as "exquisitely drawn" and wrote:

Saariaho's works can occasionally bog down beneath the weight of their own abstraction, but in Circle Map, the straightforward (if mystical) poetic texts unlock the piece and make it one of her most accessible orchestral scores. The first movement titled "Morning Wind" is carried on wisps of woodwind melody; "Circles" overlays brass riffs and myriad small repeating gestures. The final movement, the most striking in its gentle lambent light, imagines what Rumi meant by a "quiet, bright reedsong."

The composition was also praised by David Wright of The Classical Review, who called it "a rich, multilayered work" and wrote, "All the effort and expense involved in mounting such a work paid off handsomely in the performance, which wove a deeply evocative sound-world around verses by the 13th-century poet Rumi, spoken on the electronic track in the original Persian."
