= Adriana Mater =

2006 opera by Kaija Saariaho

- Opera by Kaija Saariaho
- Librettist: Amin Maalouf
- Language: French
- Premiere: 3 April 2006; Opéra Bastille

Adriana Mater is the second opera by the Finnish composer Kaija Saariaho, with a libretto in French by her frequent collaborator, Amin Maalouf. The Opéra National de Paris and the Finnish National Opera jointly commissioned the opera. It received its world premiere at the Opéra Bastille on 3 April 2006 in a production directed by Peter Sellars. The production was dedicated to Gerard Mortier, Artistic Director of the Paris Opera.

The opera's Finnish premiere took place on 23 February 2008 in Helsinki. The opera received its UK premiere in a concert performance on 24 April 2008 and its US premiere took place at the Santa Fe Opera on 26 July 2008 with the singers Monica Groop and Pia Freund in their roles of the Finnish premiere.

Saariaho used memories of her own first pregnancy as part of the inspiration for the opera. Maalouf utilised his memories of being a war correspondent and his awareness of contemporary political and religious conflicts as themes in the opera.

== Roles ==
| Role | Voice type | Paris World Premiere Cast, 7 April 2006, (Conductor: Esa-Pekka Salonen) | Finnish Premiere Cast, 23 February 2008, (Conductor: Ernest Martínez Izquierdo) | American Premiere Cast, 26 July 2008, (Conductor:Ernest Martínez Izquierdo) |
|---|---|---|---|---|
| Adriana | Mezzo-soprano | Patricia Bardon | Monica Groop | Monica Groop |
| Refka, Adriana's sister | Soprano | Solveig Kringelborn | Pia Freund | Pia Freund |
| Yonas, Adriana's son | Tenor | Gordon Gietz | Tuomas Katajala | Joseph Kaiser |
| Tsargo | Bass-baritone | Stephen Milling | Jyrki Korhonen | Matthew Best |
Chorus

== Synopsis ==
The opera is set in the present day, in a crisis zone in an unnamed country. The story reflects on motherhood. Adriana, her son Yonas and her sister Refka are caught in the midst of civil war. Years ago, Tsargo, a soldier from their village, raped the young Adriana, and Yonas was born despite Refka's efforts to prevent her sister having the child. Adriana now anxiously watches Yonas as he grows into a man, and wonders whether he will grow up to be as violent as his father or gentler like his mother.

== Critical reactions ==
"In the TV interview Saariaho named director Sellars as the hero of the performance. Aside from the bitter and violent war events, Sellars has added to the opera a dimension of hope that the conductor herself had not envisaged in the first place.

"One of the principal themes in the opera is the relationship between the main character Adriana and her sister Refka. According to librettist Maalouf, the opera reflects "our world that has gone off the rails" while violent powers are rumbling in the music of the opera, also a poetic level of dream and reverie is present. The intense theme of the work forces the individual to contemplate particularly his or her relationship towards revenge and forgiveness.

"Adriana Mater demonstrates that Kaija Saariaho remains one of the most interesting and imaginative contemporary composers."
