= Émilie (opera) =

- Monodrama by Kaija Saariaho
- Librettist: Amin Maalouf
- Language: French
- Based on: life and writings of Émilie du Châtelet
- Premiere: 1 March 2010; Opéra National de Lyon

Émilie is an opera – specifically a 9-scene, 75-minute monodrama for soprano – by Finnish composer Kaija Saariaho to a libretto by Amin Maalouf. It was written in 2008. Based on the life and writings of Marquise Émilie du Châtelet (1706–1749), the work premiered at the Opéra de Lyon, France, on 1 March 2010, with Finnish soprano Karita Mattila, its dedicatee, in the title role. It recounts the achievements of this mathematician, physicist, and mistress of Voltaire: the first woman to establish an international scientific reputation, with pioneering work in the study of fire.

Billed as the third opera by Saariaho, Émilie is more accurately a sister-piece to the oratorio La Passion de Simone (2006).

In 2020, the opera was performed at the Peabody Conservatory with Australian conductor Leonard Weiss, led by soprano Elizabeth Futral, who premiered the role at Spoleto in 2011.

== Subject ==
The opera Émilíe is based on the actual biography of Émilie du Châtelet, an 18th-century French intellectual in her own right and the mistress of the French philosopher Voltaire. She had a child by a later lover, and the childbirth led to her death. In the plot of the opera, her character's arias are linked to the birth of the child and of her significant scholarship. The soprano soloist is seen in character pregnant and penning new ideas as the opera begins.

The subject of the work depicted in the opera was Éléments de la philosophie de Newton (1738) by Voltaire and Châtelet that helped to popularize the theories and thought of Isaac Newton.

Émilie is one of three "female-centered operas" by Saariaho exhibiting a sonic world that feminist musicologist Susan McClary characterizes as "a 'sensual version of modernism', one in which 'smoldering intensities' of desire find voice."

Since Châtelet was actually tutored in mathematics by leading European scholars and her exceptional skills were thought to influence Voltaire's work, the scenery in the 2008 Opera de Lyon production of the opera featured images of mathematical equations as significant aspects of the set and scenery for the monodrama.

== Reviews ==
One reviewer described it in 2010 as a "blue-stocking monodrama about the tension between intellect and nature." When it came to the Spoleto Festival USA in 2011, James R. Oestreich in The New York Times characterized the title part as "a tour de force for soprano, some 75 minutes of almost continuous vocalization: speech, elevated speech and soaring melodic arcs, some with electronic voice processing to produce ghostly duets." In 2012, a reviewer who attended a performance at the Lincoln Center Festival hailed the opera's "triumphant New York debut".

== Stage productions ==
- 2010: World Premiere Production at the Opéra de Lyon, directed by François Girard, conducted by Kazushi Ōno, starring Karita Mattila.
- 2011: Second Production (US Premiere) at the Spoleto Festival USA, directed by Marianne Weems, conducted by John Kennedy, starring Elizabeth Futral. Reprised in 2012 at the Lincoln Center Festival by the same team, and in 2015 at the Finnish National Opera by conductor André de Ridder and soprano Camilla Nylund.
- 2013: Third Production (Portuguese Premiere) at the Gulbenkian Foundation, directed by Vasco Araújo and André e. Teodósio, conducted by Ernest Martinez Izquierdo, starring Barbara Hannigan.
- 2014: Fourth Production (Austrian Premiere) at the Landestheater Salzburg, directed by Agnessa Nefjodov, conducted by Leo Hussain, starring Allison Cook.
- 2022: Concert Performance (Australian Premiere) presented by the opera company The Cooperative in Sydney, conducted by Joanna Drimatis, with the role of Émilie distributed between five sopranos.
- 2024: Fifth Production (German Premiere, upcoming) at the Staatstheater Mainz, directed by Immo Karaman, conducted by Hermann Bäumer.
