= Anssi Karttunen =

Finnish cellist (born 1960)

Anssi Karttunen (born September 30 1960) is a Finnish cellist. His parents were trade union representative Eeva Karttunen (24.12.1934 - 9.7.2022) and visual artist Hanno Karttunen (4.1.1933 - 31.3.2026).

Karttunen studied at the Sibelius Academy in Helsinki where his teachers were Vili Pullinen and Erkki Rautio. At 17 he moved to London and later to the Netherlands to study privately with William Pleeth, Jacqueline du Pré and Tibor de Machula.

Karttunen's repertoire ranges from the early baroque to living composers and improvisation. He has performed with many orchestras in Europe, Asia, and the Americas, including the Philharmonia, BBC Symphony, Orchestre de Paris, Filarmonica della Scala, RAI Torino, Munich Philharmonic, Royal Concertgebouw Orchestra, NHK Orchestra, Tokyo Symphony, Shanghai Symphony, Hong Kong Sinfonietta, Boston Symphony, Philadelphia Orchestra, Los Angeles Philharmonic, Simón Bolívar Symphony Orchestra, and Filarmónica de Buenos Aires, and at major festivals worldwide.

Karttunen has given world premieres of over 240 works, among them 32 for cello and orchestra. Many composers have dedicated works to him, including Luca Francesconi, Magnus Lindberg, Kaija Saariaho, Esa-Pekka Salonen, Tan Dun, Rolf Wallin, Pascal Dusapin, Fred Lerdahl (Arches), and Betsy Jolas. Karttunen has transcribed over 60 pieces for cello or various chamber ensembles, such as Johannes Brahms's Piano Quintet for string quintet and Händel-Variations for string trio, Robert Schumann's Album für die Jugend for string trio, Cello Concerto for cello and string quartet and for cello and string orchestra.

Karttunen regularly performs with various chamber ensembles, including the Sons of Chipotle with John Paul Jones, the Zebra Trio with violinist Ernst Kovacic and violist Steven Dann, a cello-piano duo with Nicolas Hodges, and the Tres Coyotes with Magnus Lindberg and John Paul Jones.

From 1994 to 1998 Karttunen was the artistic director of the Avanti! Chamber Orchestra. He has been artistic director of the Helsinki Biennale (1995, 1997), the Suvisoitto-festival in Porvoo, Finland (1994-1997) and the Musica Nova Helsinki Festival 2015. He was principal cellist of the London Sinfonietta from 1999 to 2005.

Together with Kaija Saariaho, Jean-Baptiste Barrière and Muriel von Braun, Karttunen created www.petals.org, a nonprofit organisation for distributing music in different forms over the internet.

Since 2008 Karttunen has directed the Creative Dialogue workshop, which he created with Kaija Saariaho, Magnus Lindberg. Creative Dialogue took place first in Santa Fe, NM and Järvenpää, Finland and more recently at Château de Beauchêne, France and Wanantaka Manor, Finland. Karttunen teaches at the Ecole Normale de Musique de Paris.

In 2019 he co-founded the ensemble Sons of Chipotle with John Paul Jones of Led Zeppelin fame. The group premiered with concerts in Seoul, South Korea, and at the Pit Inn in Tokyo, Japan, that year, joined by musicians Jim O'Rourke and Otomo Yoshihide. Sons of Chipotle performed its first U.S. date in March 2024 at the Big Ears Festival in Knoxville, Tennessee.

Karttunen lives in Paris and is married to the Venezuelan-Finnish painter and sculptor Muriel von Braun. He plays a cello by Francesco Ruggeri.
