= Korvat auki =

Korvat auki r.y. (Finnish for "Ears Open") is a Finnish society, founded in 1977 to advocate and import contemporary music and whose work primarily focuses on younger composers. The founders include Kaija Saariaho, Jouni Kaipainen, Magnus Lindberg, Olli Kortekangas, Eero Hämeenniemi, and Esa-Pekka Salonen. The society organizes concerts and seminars. Initiated by the society, two ensembles have been created to perform new music in Finland: Toimii and Zagros.

== Members ==
- Eero Hämeenniemi
- Kaija Saariaho
- Tapani Länsiö
- Olli Kortekangas
- Jouni Kaipainen
- Esa-Pekka Salonen
- Magnus Lindberg
