= Cello Concerto (Salonen) =

Concerto by Esa-Pekka Salonen

The Cello Concerto is a composition for cello and orchestra by the Finnish composer Esa-Pekka Salonen. The work was co-commissioned by the Chicago Symphony Orchestra, the New York Philharmonic, the Barbican Centre, and the Elbphilharmonie. It was completed in 2017 and was first performed by the cellist Yo-Yo Ma and the Chicago Symphony Orchestra under the direction of Salonen on March 9, 2017. The piece is dedicated to Yo-Yo Ma.

== Composition ==
=== Background ===
The Cello Concerto is Salonen's fourth concerto, following his Alto Saxophone Concerto, Piano Concerto and Violin Concerto (composed in 1980, 2007, and 2009, respectively). In the score program notes, Salonen stated that ideas for the piece "can be traced back by at least three decades, but the actual material for the piece was mostly developed in the summer of 2015 when I decided to spend a few months researching for new kinds of textures without a concrete plan how to use them." The second and third movements of the concerto contain quotes especially from the composer's 2010 knock, breathe, shine for solo cello.

=== Form ===
The piece has a duration of roughly 38 minutes and is cast in the traditional three-movement fast–slow–fast concerto form. The first movement bears the informal title of "Chaos to line," about which Salonen remarked, "I like the concept of a simple thought emerging out of a complex landscape. Almost like consciousness developing from clouds of dust." He continued, "This leads to the second semi-cosmological metaphor: a comet. I imagined the solo cello line as a trajectory of a moving object in space being followed and emulated by other lines/instruments/moving objects. A bit like a comet's tail. In musical terms it could be described as a canon but not quite as the imitation is not always literal or precise. The gestus remains however almost identical every time. Sometimes the imitating cloud flies above the cello, sometimes in the very same register. It thins out to two lines and finally to one."

Salonen described the second movement as "very simple in form, more complex in texture." He wrote, "It starts with a wedge-formed cloud [>] and ends with another [<], if one can imagine such a thing. The slow cello arches are looped to create harmony from single lines. Sometimes the loops are dispersed in space. The middle section is a playful duet between the solo cello and the alto flute."

The third movement begins "with a slow, brooding cello solo under the residue of the second wedge-cloud." "The expression," Salonen added, "quickly becomes more extroverted through a series of accelerandi. A rhythmic mantra starts to develop in the congas and bongos. It will appear often later in the course of the movement, mostly in the timpani. This music is often dance-like; sometimes gesticulating wildly, perhaps from the sheer joy of no longer having nothing to do with clouds and processes." The composer concluded, "An acrobatic solo episode leads to a fast tutti section where I imagined the orchestra as some kind of gigantic lung, expanding and contracting first slowly, but accelerating to a point of mild hyperventilation which leads back to the dance-like material. Quixotic solo cello episodes lead to a joyful coda based on the 'lung' music, but now with a solo cello line. Finally the kinetic energy burns itself out gently, the rapid movement slows down and the cello line climbs slowly up to a stratospherically high b-flat, two centimetres to the left from the highest note of the piano."

=== Instrumentation ===
The work is scored for a solo cello and a large orchestra consisting of a piccolo, two flutes (2nd doubling alto flute), two oboes, cor anglais, two clarinets (2nd doubling E-flat clarinet), bass clarinet (doubling contrabass clarinet), two bassoons, contrabassoon, four horns, two trumpets, trombone, bass trombone, timpani, three percussionists, harp, piano (doubling celesta), and strings.

The concerto also uses live electronics: the solo cello is recorded in real time and the recordings are played back via speakers so that the live cello becomes accompanied by a recorded "echo" of itself.

== Reception ==
Reviewing the world premiere in Chicago, John von Rhein of the Chicago Tribune wrote, "The 2017 work [...] plays loosely with traditional concerto form but fills that free-form structure with the kinds of things the CSO's invaluable creative consultant does better than any cellist around. It is as much a showpiece for his stupendous instrumental gift as it is a study in opposing forces — think quiescent clouds of lyricism giving way to punchy hyperactivity, and back again." He added, "Those forces are finally reconciled over the course of the half-hour piece, which ends with Ma climbing to a vertiginous high B flat on the cello's A string, as if he were reaching for the stars. Cosmic imagery — racing comets and the "stylized chaos" of the universe, to quote the composer — in fact plays a central role in Salonen's compositional thinking here, as does throwing prickly technical challenges in the cellist's way and daring him, with a good-natured wink, to surmount them. Which of course he did with amazing nonchalance Thursday." Lawrence A. Johnson of the Chicago Classical Review also praised the work, but noted, "Salonen mentioned in his opening remarks that his Cello Concerto took two years to complete, which is unusually long for him. Indeed, at first hearing Thursday, one got the sense that–despite many attractive qualities–Salonen's concerto has not quite realized its final form."

Reviewing the New York City premiere, Anthony Tommasini of The New York Times lauded the piece, calling it a "restive, cosmic and formidably difficult new Cello Concerto." David Wright of the New York Classical Review was more critical of the work, however, remarking, "...at its New York unveiling, Salonen's new Cello Concerto, with Ma as soloist and the New York Philharmonic led by Alan Gilbert, seemed a work longer on novelty than expression—hardly what one would expect, given the famously passionate and ebullient performer it was composed for." Wright nevertheless added, "Whatever his objectives in a piece, the conductor-composer Salonen can be counted on to write for orchestra with exceptional imagination. This concerto continually surprised and delighted the ear with fresh sounds, from the chugging, twinkling orchestral 'chaos' of the opening pages (reminiscent of the concert's opening piece, John Adams's The Chairman Dances) to the third movement's cello-conga duet between Ma and the Philharmonic's principal percussionist Christopher S. Lamb."
