= Naive and Sentimental Music =

Symphonic work by American composer John Adams

Naive and Sentimental Music is a symphonic work by American composer John Adams. The title of the work alludes to an essay by Friedrich Schiller, On Naïve and Sentimental Poetry, that contrasts a creative personality that creates art for its own sake (the "naïve") versus one conscious of other purposes, such as art’s place in history (the "sentimental"). The composer cites both the slowly developing harmonies of Bruckner's Fourth Symphony and the atmosphere of the Sonoma coastline (where the piece was composed) as inspirations for the work. The piece was co-commissioned by the Los Angeles Philharmonic, the Ensemble Modern, the Vancouver Symphony Orchestra, and the Sydney Symphony Orchestra. It received its first public performance by the Los Angeles Philharmonic conducted by Esa-Pekka Salonen on February 19, 1999. A recording by Salonen and the Los Angeles Philharmonic was subsequently released by Nonesuch Records.

== Structure ==
The piece has a duration of approximately 48 minutes, and has three movements:

1. Naive and Sentimental Music

The first movement opens with a meandering melody over simple chords that subsequently undergoes a variety of symphonic transformations.

2. Mother of the Man

This movement consists of slowly evolving harmonies punctuated by chords from an amplified steel guitar.

3. Chain to the Rhythm

In a minimalistic vein, the last movement uses rhythmic fragments that gradually build up to a thunderous climax.

== Instrumentation ==
The work is scored for 4 flutes (3, 4 double piccolos), 3 oboes (3 doubles English horn), 3 B♭ clarinets (3 doubles bass clarinet 2), bass clarinet, 3 bassoons (3 doubles contrabassoon), 4 horns in F, 4 trumpets, 3 trombones, 2 tubas, amplified steel string guitar, piano, celesta, keyboard sampler, 2 harps, 5 percussion parts (including 3 who are principally mallet players, for a huge variety of percussive instruments: almglocken, high anvil, large bass drum, chimes, small Chinese gongs, crotales, suspended cymbals, glockenspiel, Japanese temple bowls, low gongs, marimba, “ranch” triangles, shaker, large sleigh bells, tam-tam, triangles, vibraphone, and xylophone), and strings.

== Critical reception ==
In his review of the world premiere, Mark Swed, music critic for the Los Angeles Times, praised the work for its grand reach, stating that while stylistically it resembled Adams's earlier works, "Everything is bigger and better". For the New York Premiere, Bernard Holland, music critic for the New York Times, found the piece "Unlovely, yet compelling" in its multiple layers of sound and rhythm. Five years later, in its local premiere with the San Francisco Symphony, Joshua Kosman, music critic for the San Francisco Chronicle, praised the work in its scope and composition, writing that it "takes its rhetoric and sense of scale from the symphonies of Bruckner, Mahler and Sibelius, and its musical content from the nexus of pop melody and old-style minimalism a la Steve Reich". It was nominated for a Grammy Award in 2003 for Best Classical Contemporary Composition.
