= The Orchestra =

The Orchestra may refer to:

- The Orchestra (band), a rock band formed by former members of English bands the Electric Light Orchestra and ELO Part II
- The Orchestra (For Now) (TO(FN)), an English rock band
- The Orchestra (app), an iPad app
- The Orchestra (film), a 1990 animated film by Zbigniew Rybczyński, 1990 Prix Italia winner in category Prix Italia for Arts
- The Orchestra (series), a 1985 comedy series, who stars Julian Joy-Chagrin

== See also ==
- The Orckestra, an English avant-garde jazz and avant-rock ensemble
- Orchestra (disambiguation)
