= Timo Korhonen =

Finnish classical guitarist

Timo Korhonen (born 6 November 1964) is a Finnish classical guitarist and is one of the most distinguished classical guitarists in his generation.

== Short Biography ==
Korhonen gave his debut at 14 in his hometown Rautalampi, Finland. His international career started in 1982 after winning the ARD Music Competition in Munich, Germany. Since 1989 Korhonen has been member of distinguished contemporary music group TOIMII-ensemble. Korhonen has performed over thirty countries and premiered over forty compositions. Korhonen has recorded fifteen albums for Ondine label including his own arrangements of works Solo Violin by Johann Sebastian Bach and Complete recording of Works for Guitar by Heitor Villa-Lobos. Korhonen's recordings have acclaimed several awards and honors.

== Pieces written for and dedicated to Timo Korhonen ==
Kimmo Hakola 1958-: Guitar Concerto, 2008; Leonardo Etudes, Homage á Villa-Lobos, 2007–2008

Toshio Hosokawa 1955-: Voyage IX, "Awakening" for guitar and strings with percussion, 2007

Magnus Lindberg 1958-: Mano a mano for solo guitar, 2004

Toshio Hosokawa 1955-: Serenade for solo guitar, 2003

Herman Rechberger 1947-: Concierto Floral for guitar and orchestra, 1997

Olli Kortekangas 1955-: Arabesken der Nacht for guitar and chamber orchestra, 1995

Leo Brouwer 1939-: Concerto of Helsinki for guitar and orchestra, 1991–1992

Usko Meriläinen 1930-2004: Konsertto kitaralle ja orkesterille, 1991

Jouni Kaipainen 1956-: Tenebrae for solo guitar op 39, 1991

Olli Koskelin 1955-: Far and near for solo guitar, 1990; Tutte le Corde for guitar and tape, 1988–1989

Tauno Marttinen 1912-2008: Harlekiini for violin and guitar, 1986

== Compositions written for and dedicated to Timo Korhonen as member of the TOIMII-ensemble ==
Oliver Knussen 1952-2018: Rough Cut for Toimii, 1996

Magnus Lindberg 1958-: Kiri for clarinet, guitar, cello, percussion, and electronics, 1993; Decorrente for clarinet, cello, guitar, percussion and piano, 1992

Arthur Sauer: Joukahainen's Defeat, 1993

Peter Bengtson 1961-: Festspielmusik II: Gemalte Leiche, 1992

Riku Niemi 1967-: Magnus meets Monk, 1991

== Recordings ==
- Johann Sebastian Bach: Partitas for Solo Violin - arranged for guitar by Timo Korhonen, Ondine ODE 1164-2, 2010
- Johann Sebastian Bach: Sonatas for Solo Violin - arranged for guitar by Timo Korhonen, Ondine ODE 1128-2, 2009
- Magnus Lindberg: Mano a mano 2004; Toru Takemitsu: In The Woods, 1995, Three pieces for Guitar; Hans-Werner Henze: The 1st Sonata on Shakespearean characters for guitar, 1975–76. Ondine ODE 1091-2, 2007
- Heitor Villa-Lobos: Etudes pour la Guitarre, käsikirjoitusversio vuodelta 1928!; Leo Brouwer: Estudios Sencillos 1-20. Ondine ODE 1028-2, 2004
- Ludwig van Beethoven / Francisco Tárrega: "Claro de Luna" (Adagio sostenuto de la Sonata Op. 27 No. 2); Menuet (Septet, Op. 20); Fragmento de la 7a Sinfonía (Allegretto, Op. 92); Marcha fúnebre de la Sonata No. 12 (Op. 26); Scherzo de la Sonata No. 2, Op. 2; Adagio cantabile (Sonata No. 8, Op. 13 ); Tema (Tema con variazioni Op. 20 ); Variación del Septimino (Tema con variazioni, Op. 20); Andante de la Sonata No. 9 ( Op. 47, " Kreutzer " ); Menuet (No. 3, 6 Minuets, WoO 10); Largo con gran espressione ( Sonata No. 4, Op. 7); Richard Wagner / Francisco Tárrega: Tannhäuser Fragmento de la Sinfonía; Marcha de Tannhäuser; Francisco Tárrega / Giuseppe Verdi: Fantasia sobre motivos "La Traviata". Ondine ODE 1013-2, 2003
- Leo Brouwer: Concerto of Helsinki kitaralle ja orkesterille, omistettu Timo Korhoselle; Isaac Albéniz / Leo Brouwer: Suite Ibéria kitaralle ja orkesterille; Lennon–McCartney / Leo Brouwer: From Yesterday to Penny Lane, Seven Songs after Beatles kitaralle ja jousille. Ondine ODE 979-2, 2002
- Kaija Saariaho: "Grammar of Dreams", Adjö for soprano, flute and guitar; Caliban's Dream for baritone, clarinet, mandolin, guitar, harp and doublebass; Die Aussicht for sopranbo, flute, guitar, viola and cello; Anu Komsi, Timo Korhonen and AVANTI!, Ondine ODE 958-2, 2000
- Fryderyk Chopin arr. Francisco Tárrega: Nocturne op. 32/1, Nocturne op. 9/2, Prélude op. 28/7, Prélude op. 28/20, Prélude op.28/15, Mazurka op.33/1, Mazurka op. 24/3, Mazurka op. 33/4, Waltz op.34/2. Miguel Llobet: 10 katalonialaista kansanlaulua. Ondine ODE 903-2, 1997
- Heitor Villa-Lobos: Complete Works for Guitar Vol. 2) Préludes, Sextuor Mystique, Distribuiçao de Flores, Modinha, Bachianas Brasileiras No. 5, Suite Populaire Bresiliénne, Chôros No. 1. with chamber ensemble. Ondine ODE 838-2, 1996
- Heitor Villa-Lobos: Complete Works for Guitar Vol. 1) Introduction aux Chôros for guitar and orchestra, Concerto for guitar and orchestra,12 Etudés. Finnish RSO, Sakari Oramo. Ondine ODE 837-2, 1995
- Fernando Sor: Fantaisie op. 30, Etudes op. 35 II book, Etude op. 31 nr. 23, Fantaisie Villageoise op. 52, Fantaisie Elegiaque op. 59. Ondine ODE 816-2, 1994
- Folk Songs from Spain, Finland and China. Dilbér, soprano and Korhonen, guitar. Ondine ODE 812-2, 1993
- Manuel Ponce: Sonatina Meridional, Théme, Varié et Finale, Sonata No. 3, Variations sur "Folia d'España" et Fugue. Ondine ODE 770-2, 1992
- Francisco Tárrega: Recuerdos de la Alhambra, Capricho Arábe: Federico Moreno Torroba: Suite Castellana, Torija, Sonatina: Isaac Albéniz: Córdoba, Capricho Catalan, Sevilla. Ondine ODE 752-2, 1990
- Leo Brouwer: La Espiral Eterna, Tarantos, Paisaje Cubano con Campanas; Franco Donatoni: Algo, due pezzi per chitarra; Olli Koskelin: Tutte le Corde for guitar and tape; Alberto Ginastera: Sonata op. 47. Ondine ODE 730-2, 1989
- En Sång om Gemenskap, with Carola Häggkvist, voice; live recording from Swedish Television Channel 1 Show Carola så in i Norden, SVT-7402, 1984

== Awards and recognitions ==
- 2009 KlassikHeute "10"
- 2007 Gramophone Recommends
- 2004 KlassikHeute "10"
- 2003 KlassikHeute "10"
- 2003 Cannes Classical Award
- 2002 record of the month April, Classicstoday.com
- 2000 The Finnish Broadcasting Corporation, Record of the Year 2000
- 1990 The Finnish Broadcasting Corporation, Record of the Year 1990
- 1988 Léonie Sonning-Stipendium 1988
- 1986 III-Prize, The Personal Special Prize of the President of the Leo Brouwer and Special Prize for the Best Performance of Latin-American Composition at Havana International Guitar Competition
- 1983 City of Rautalampi Arts Awards 1983
- 1982 The winner (II Prize, no 1st Prize given) at the ARD Music Competition in Munich
