= Anders Hillborg =

Swedish composer (born 1954)

Per Anders Hillborg (born 31 May 1954) is one of Sweden’s leading composers.

== Education ==
Anders Hillborg was born in Sollentuna, and studied composition, counterpoint and electronic music at the Kungliga Musikhögskolan in Stockholm from 1976 to 1982. His teachers were Gunnar Bucht, Lars-Erik Rosell, Arne Mellnäs and Pär Lindgren. An important source of inspiration was Brian Ferneyhough, who was a visiting professor at the time.

== Career ==
Apart from some minor teaching positions, professor in composition at Musikhögskolan i Malmö 1990 and masterclasses, Hillborg has been a freelance composer since 1982. His output is vast and includes orchestral, choir, chamber works as well as film and popular music. An example of his work in the popular realm is his collaboration with Eva Dahlgren, which resulted in the 1995 album Jag vill se min älskade komma från det vilda. The project was first presented at the Helsinki Festival with the Swedish Radio Symphony Orchestra conducted by Esa-Pekka Salonen.

His collaboration with Salonen has resulted in numerous works, including Dreaming River (premiered by the Royal Stockholm Philharmonic Orchestra in 1999); Eleven Gates (2005–06), premiered and commissioned by the Los Angeles Philharmonic; and the large-scale work Sirens, jointly commissioned by the Los Angeles Philharmonic and the Chicago Symphony Orchestra.

Other works include Cold Heat (2010), which was co-commissioned by the Berlin Philharmonic, the Finnish Radio Symphony Orchestra and Tonhalle Orchestra, Zürich Tonhalleorkestern and was premiered in 2011 by the Berliner Philharmonie under David Zinman.

Hillborg has held multiple residential fellowships (2010–11, 2011–12, Fall 2018) at the Swedish Collegium for Advanced Study in Uppsala, Sweden.

As a part of the 2025 Mahler Festival hosted at the Concertgebouw, Amsterdam, Hillborg's orchestral piece Hell Mountain—jointly commissioned by the Royal Concertgebouw Orchestra, Orchestre de Paris, Oslo Philharmonic, and the Chicago Symphony Orchestra—was premiered by Klaus Mäkelä leading the Royal Concertgebouw Orchestra, as a prelude to a performance of Mahler's Symphony No. 1.

== Selected awards ==
- Christ Johnson Prize 1991 and 1997
- International Rostrum of Composers 1992

== Selected works ==
Orchestral

- Clang and Fury (1985–1989)
- Cold Heat (2010)
- Dreaming River (1999)
- Eleven Gates (2005–2006)
- Exquisite Corpse (2002, 2005)
- Flood Dreams (2009)
- Himmelsmekanik (1983–1985)
- King Tide (1999)
- Liquid Marble (1995)
- Beast Sampler (2014)
- Sirens for two sopranos, mixed choir and orchestra (2011)
- Sound Atlas (2018)
- Hell Mountain (2025)

Concertante

- Violin Concerto No. 1 (1991–1992)
- Trombone Concerto (1993)
- Clarinet Concerto Peacock Tales (1999, 2002)
- Piano Concerto (2000)
- Concerto for 2 Trombones and Orchestra (2004)
- Percussion Concerto (2007)
- Flute Concerto (2009)
- Méditations sur Pétrarque for oboe and orchestra (2009)
- Violin Concerto No. 2 (2016)
- Cello Concerto (2020)
- Viola Concerto (2021)

Chamber music

- Musik för 10 altvioliner (Music for 10 Violas) (1987, 1993)
- Hautposaune for trombone and tape (1990)
- Tampere Raw for clarinet and piano (1991)
- Heisenbergminiatyrer for string quartet (2006–2007)

Choral

- Mouyayoum for mixed chorus (1983–1985)
