= Mark Swed =

American music critic (born 1945)

- Born: c. 1945 (age 80–81)
- Education: University of California, Berkeley (BA); Mills College (MA)
- Occupation: Music critic
- Notable credits: Los Angeles Times; Los Angeles Herald Examiner; The Wall Street Journal

Mark Swed (born c. 1945) is a retired American music critic who specialized in classical music. From 1996 until September 2025 he was the chief classical music critic of the Los Angeles Times where his writings made him a two-time finalist for the Pulitzer Prize for Criticism. Prior to his LA Times post, Swed was the chief music critic for the Los Angeles Herald Examiner and The Wall Street Journal, and has contributed other writings to a variety of publications including The Orchestra, an iPad application. He has a particular interest in contemporary classical music.

== Life and career ==
Mark Swed was born c. 1945 and attended the University of California, Berkeley, receiving a Bachelor of Arts in music, and Mills College, receiving a Master of Arts. He was chief music critic at numerous newspapers, including the Los Angeles Herald Examiner, The Wall Street Journal and 7 Days. In addition, he has written other music criticism for a variety of publications, including BBC Music, Gramophone, Musical America, Opera News, Schwann-Opus, Stagebill, The Economist, The New York Times and The New Yorker. Interested in contemporary classical music early on, Swed edited the 20th-century classical music section of The Musical Quarterly from 1992 to 2000. He wrote substantial commentary—described by Grove Music Online as a "book-length text"—for The Orchestra, a well-received iPad application that featured Esa-Pekka Salonen and the Philharmonia Orchestra with autoscrolling and interactive sheet music to numerous orchestral works. He often makes appearances on KCRW, an NPR radio station of Santa Monica College. In 1996, he became the chief classical music critic of the Los Angeles Times, succeeding Martin Bernheimer. Swed is currently engaged in writing a biography of the American composer John Cage.

The recipient of numerous awards, Swed received the 1994 ASCAP Deems Taylor Award, as well as a Letter of Distinction from the American Music Center. The Los Angeles Music Center and the Los Angeles Press Club have also recognized his work. He has been a finalist for the Pulitzer Prize for Criticism twice, in 2007 and 2021. The 2007 nomination is described as being "For his passionate music criticism, marked by resonant writing and an ability to give life to the people behind a performance". For his 2021 nomination, the nomination was "for a series of critical essays that broke through the silence of the pandemic to recommend an eclectic array of recordings as entertainment and solace essential to the moment, drawing deep connections to seven centuries of classical music". He is a fellow at The Los Angeles Institute for the Humanities at the USC Dornsife College of Letters, Arts and Sciences of the University of Southern California.

Swed retired from the Los Angeles Times in September 2026.

== Selected writings ==
- Swed, Mark (1989). Celebrating Twenty Five years 1964–1989. Los Angeles: Music Center of Los Angeles County. OCLC 25427375.

=== Articles ===
- Swed, Mark (October 1988). "John Cage: A Celebration". The Musical Times. 129 (1748): 516–518. doi:10.2307/966687. JSTOR 966687.
- —— (November 1988). "Philip Glass's Operas". The Musical Times. 129 (1749): 577–579. doi:10.2307/966783. JSTOR 966783.
- —— (June 1989). "Schnabel the Composer". The Musical Times. 130 (1756): 332–335. doi:10.2307/966028. JSTOR 966028.
- —— (November 1989). "John Adams". The Musical Times. 130 (1761): 662–664. doi:10.2307/1193777. JSTOR 1193777.
- —— (Spring 1993). "John Cage: September 5, 1912-August 12, 1992". The Musical Quarterly. 77 (1): 132–144. doi:10.1093/mq/77.1.132. JSTOR 742432.
- —— (Summer 1993). "Editor's Note to Philip Glass's "Akhnaten"". The Musical Quarterly. 77 (2): 236–240. doi:10.1093/mq/77.2.236. JSTOR 742556.
- —— (Spring 1994). "Editor's Introduction to "Synergetic Dynamics in John Cage's "Europeras 1 & 2""". The Musical Quarterly. 78 (1): 127–130. doi:10.1093/mq/78.1.127. JSTOR 742496.
- —— (Summer 1994). "Editor's Introduction". The Musical Quarterly. 78 (2): 288–289. doi:10.1093/mq/78.2.288. JSTOR 742544.
- —— (Summer 1995). "Editor's Introduction". The Musical Quarterly. 79 (2): 309–311. doi:10.1093/mq/79.2.309. JSTOR 742248.
- —— (Spring 1996). "Remembering "Modern Music"". The Musical Quarterly. 80 (1): 58–60. doi:10.1093/mq/80.1.58. JSTOR 742528.
- —— (18 November 2020). "Philip Glass and 'Einstein on the Beach': How one opera changed everything". Los Angeles Times.
- —— (8 February 2022). "Appreciation: How George Crumb became one of America's most surprisingly consequential composers". Los Angeles Times.
