= Lachen verlernt =

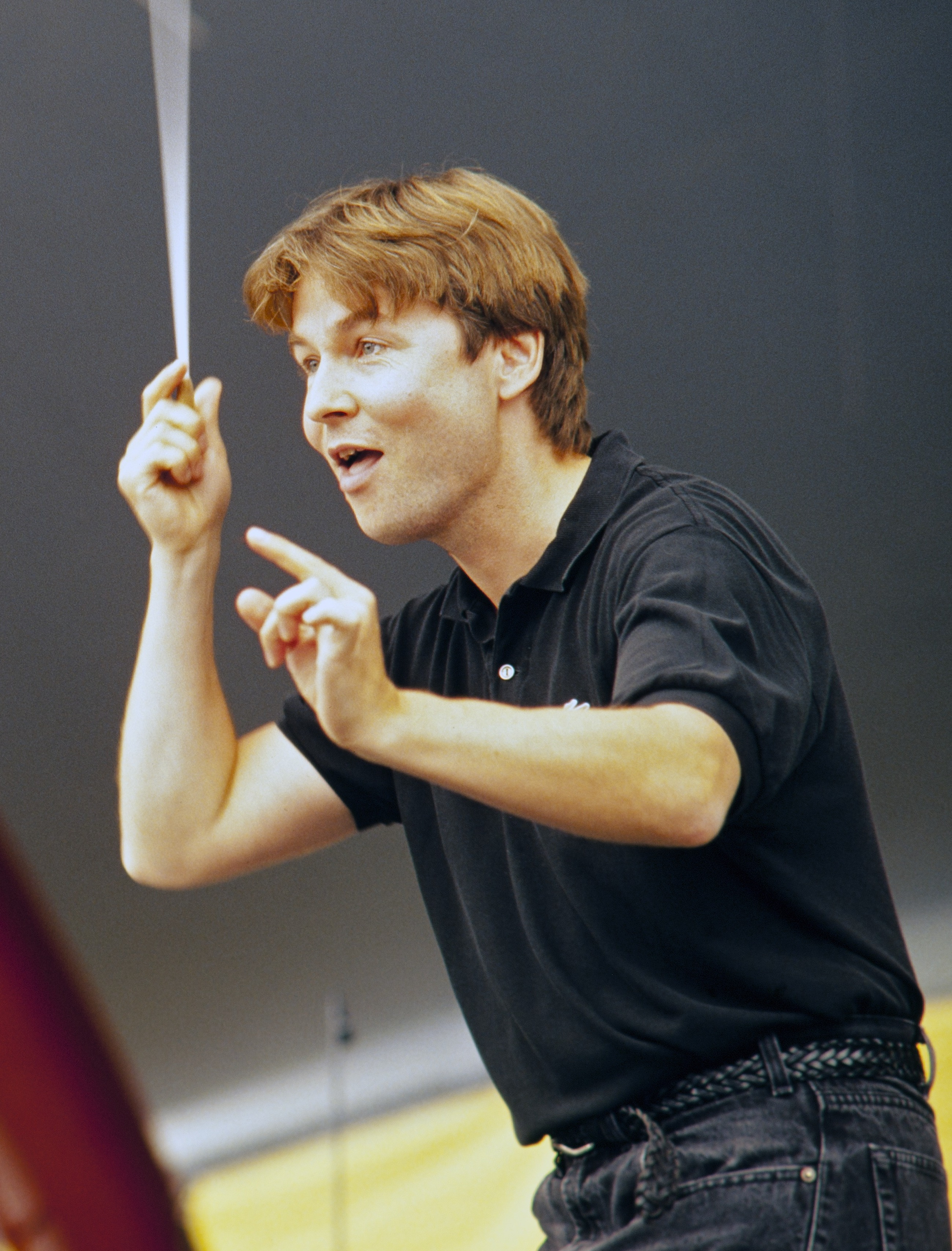
Esa-Pekka Salonen in 1997

Lachen verlernt (Laughing Unlearnt) is a chaconne for solo violin by the Finnish composer Esa-Pekka Salonen. The work was commissioned by the La Jolla Chamber Music Society's SummerFest with additional contributions from Joan and Irwin M. Jacobs. It was written for violinist Cho-Liang Lin, to whom the piece is dedicated. It was first performed by Cho-Liang Lin at the La Jolla SummerFest, La Jolla, August 10, 2002.

== Composition ==
Lachen verlernt is composed in a single movement has a duration of roughly 10 minutes. The title of the piece is a quote from the ninth movement of Arnold Schoenberg's Pierrot Lunaire. Salonen described the title and form of the work in the score program notes, writing:

The title Lachen verlernt (Laughing unlearnt) is a quotation from the ninth movement of Schönberg's Pierrot Lunaire, Gebet an Pierrot (Prayer to Pierrot). The narrator declares that she has unlearnt the skill of laughing and begs Pierrot, the 'Horse-doctor to the soul', to give it back to her. I felt that this is a very moving metaphor of a performer: a serious clown trying to help the audience to connect with emotions they have lost, or believe they have lost. Lachen verlernt is essentially a Chaconne, which in this case means that there is a harmonic progression that repeats itself several times. The harmony remains the same throughout the whole piece; only the surface, the top layer of the music changes.

== Reception ==
Reviewing the world premiere, Mark Swed of the Los Angeles Times called it "an unusually unsettled and dark-seeming tone from a composer whose works have tended to be sunnier. Alone, it says something about our times." Swed continued:

The beginning is sparse, tense, dramatic—long notes sharply cut off with brusque curlicues. What follows is both furious and strangely gorgeous, impressive virtuoso flourishes on open strings, fancy scale work and passages thick with chords. The final, flutey bars are but the hint of laughter regained, just sweet enough to leave a comforting afterglow, especially with Lin's masterful performance evoking the best Bach playing.

Molly Sheridan of NewMusicBox later described the piece as "a little showy, a little classic, a little melancholy, but mostly just written in such a way that it fits together as tightly as an aural jigsaw puzzle."
