= L.A. Variations =

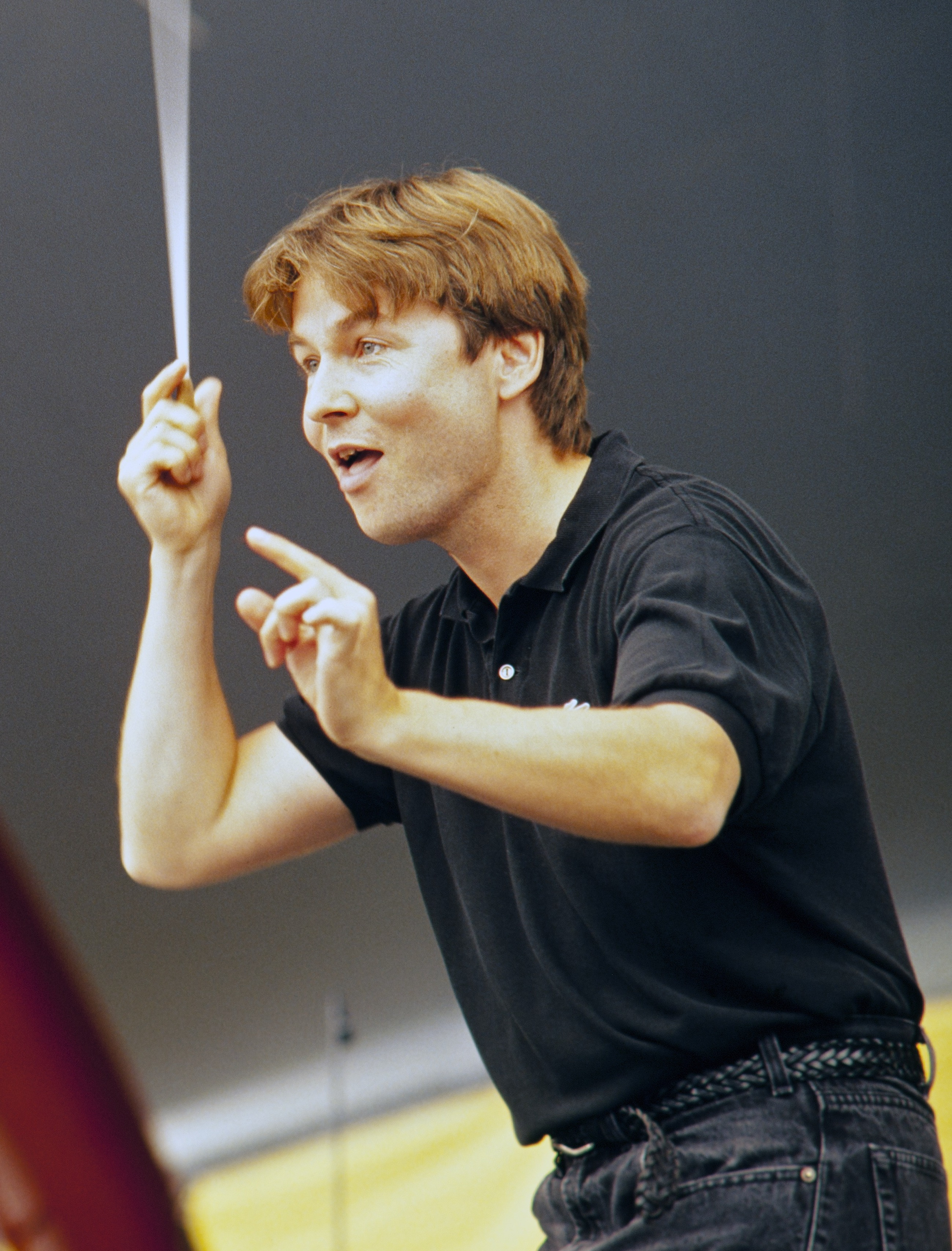
Esa-Pekka Salonen in 1997

L.A. Variations (sometimes stylized as LA Variations) is an orchestral composition by the Finnish composer Esa-Pekka Salonen. The work was commissioned by the Los Angeles Philharmonic, of which Salonen was then music director. It was first performed at the Dorothy Chandler Pavilion in Los Angeles, on January 16, 1997, with Salonen conducting the Los Angeles Philharmonic. The piece is dedicated to the orchestra, about which Salonen remarked, "I wrote LA Variations specifically for the players of the Los Angeles Philharmonic. I'm very proud of the virtuosity and power of my orchestra."

== Composition ==
L.A. Variations is composed in a single movement and has a duration of roughly 19 minutes. The piece is constructed around two hexachords, which together cover all twelve notes of the chromatic scale.

=== Instrumentation ===
The work is scored for an orchestra comprising piccolo, 1 flute, alto flute, two oboes, cor anglais, 2 clarinets (2nd doubling E-flat clarinet), bass clarinet, contrabass clarinet, two bassoons, contrabassoon, four French horns, three trumpets (3rd doubling piccolo trumpet), three trombones, tuba, timpani, three percussionists, harp, celesta, synthesizer, and strings.

== Reception ==
Reviewing the world premiere, Mark Swed of the Los Angeles Times called L.A. Variations "a happy event" and praised Salonen for his "brilliant orchestration." Swed noted the influence of Jean Sibelius and such 20th-century composers as Witold Lutosławski and György Ligeti, but added, "Still, Salonen puts it all together in his own way. There is a rhythm of activity and a love for acrobatic complexities that are his hallmark. And there is the sheer exhilaration of providing at least a thrill a minute during the 19-minute piece from a virtuoso orchestra that he knows intimately." Gramophone was more critical of Salonen's eclecticism, however, writing, "On first listening‚ I found the music here elusively conventional‚ rather as if Salonen’s very orchestral expertise had prevented the tension between compositional idea and performing realisation from sparking something new."

In 2013, Seth Colter Walls of WQXR-FM reflected that the work was "a bold step forward" in Salonen's career as a composer.
