= Nyx (Salonen) =

2011 symphonic poem by Esa-Pekka Salonen

Nyx is a symphonic poem by the Finnish composer Esa-Pekka Salonen. The work was jointly commissioned by Radio France, the Barbican Centre, the Atlanta Symphony Orchestra, Carnegie Hall, and the Finnish Broadcasting Company. It was premiered February 19, 2011, in the Théâtre du Châtelet, Paris, with Salonen conducting the Orchestre Philharmonique de Radio France. The piece is titled after the Goddess Nyx from Greek mythology.

== Composition ==
Nyx is composed in one continuous movement and has a duration of roughly 17 minutes.

=== Background ===
The piece marked Salonen's first purely orchestral composition since his 2005 composition Helix. He commented on the composition of Nyx in the score program notes, writing:

Rather than utilizing the principle of continuous variation of material, as is the case mostly in my recent music, Nyx behaves rather differently. Its themes and ideas essentially keep their properties throughout the piece while the environment surrounding them keeps changing constantly. Mere whispers grow into roar; an intimate line of the solo clarinet becomes a slowly breathing broad melody of tutti strings at the end of the 18-minute arch of Nyx.

He continued:

I set myself a particular challenge when starting the composition process, something I hadn't done earlier: to write complex counterpoint for almost one hundred musicians playing tutti at full throttle without losing clarity of the different layers and lines; something that Strauss and Mahler so perfectly mastered. Not an easy task, but a fascinating one. I leave it to the listener to judge how well I succeeded.

=== Title ===
The piece is titled after the Goddess Nyx from Greek mythology. Salonen wrote of this inspiration:

Nyx is a shadowy figure in Greek mythology. At the very beginning of everything there's a big mass of dark stuff called Chaos, out of which comes Gaia or Ge, the Earth, who gives birth (spontaneously!) to Uranus, the starry heaven, and Pontus, the sea. Nyx (also sometimes known as Nox) is supposed to have been another child of Gaia, along with Erebus. The union of Nyx and Erebus produces Day.

He further remarked:

She is an extremely nebulous figure altogether; we have no sense of her character or personality. It is this very quality that has long fascinated me and made me decide to name my new orchestral piece after her. I'm not trying to describe this mythical goddess in any precise way musically. However, the almost constant flickering and rapid changing of textures and moods as well as a certain elusive character of many musical gestures may well be related to the subject.

=== Instrumentation ===
The work is scored for a large orchestra comprising piccolo, three flutes (doubling piccolo), three oboes, cor anglais, three clarinets, bass clarinet, three bassoons, contrabassoon, four French horns, three trumpets, three trombones, tuba, timpani, three percussionists, harp, celesta (doubling piano), and strings.

== Reception ==
Mark Swed of the Los Angeles Times wrote, "There are, in Nyx, any number of Salonen traits. The big orchestra climaxes vibrated all of Disney. I heard in the dappled instrumental colors a return to a slightly more European feeling in the composer's work. He has certainly not lost interest in Ravel, but there is also a Mahlerian kind of night music at work when grotesque details peek through the thick but transparent textures." Arnold Whittall of Gramophone similarly lauded, "Nyx is a Greek goddess associated with night and Salonen's music is at its best when searching for a nocturnal atmosphere that is not simply drifting nebulously but moving forwards with a dream-like sense of menace and mystery." Lawrence A. Johnson of the Chicago Classical Review called the music "intensely compelling" and described it as "Impressionism on steroids." David Allen of The New York Times remarked, "Arguably, it's most evocative when most tender, as with the delicate flutters given to the piece's protagonist, the principal clarinet ..., or in the way the thick string textures dissolve toward the end, as if awaking from a dream." Joshua Kosman of the San Francisco Chronicle praised Nyx as "far more than the sum of its influences" and called it "a rich and dazzling musical invention, a riotous showcase of ideas that unfolds in vivid and surprising ways".

Conversely, Andrew Clements of The Guardian felt that the composition "only confirms Salonen's position in the middle of the stylistic road."
