= Esa-Pekka Salonen =

Finnish conductor and composer (born 1958)

Esa-Pekka Salonen KBE
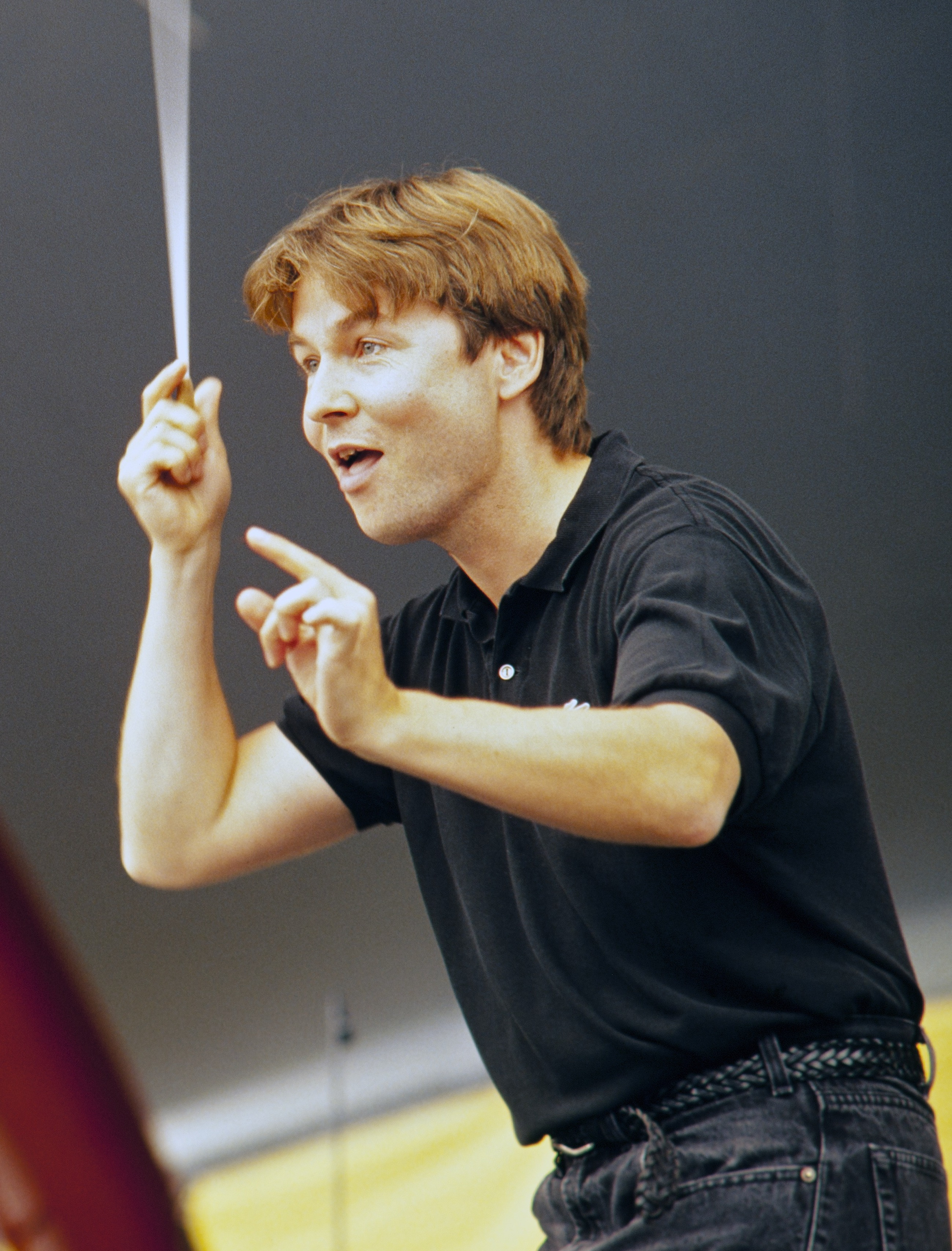
- Salonen in 1997 rehearsing the Helsinki Philharmonic Orchestra
- Born: 30 June 1958 (age 68); Helsinki, Finland
- Occupations: Conductor; composer
- Years active: 1979–present
- Organizations: Los Angeles Philharmonic; Philharmonia Orchestra; Swedish Radio Symphony Orchestra; Orchestre de Paris
- Spouses: Jane Price (m. 1991; div. 2017) Kaarina Gould (m. 2021)
- Children: 3
- Website: esapekkasalonen.com

Esa-Pekka Salonen (pronounced [ˈesɑˌpekːɑ ˈsɑlonen]; born 30 June 1958) is a Finnish conductor and composer. He is the principal conductor designate of Orchestre de Paris and creative director designate of the Los Angeles Philharmonic. He is also conductor laureate of the Los Angeles Philharmonic, Philharmonia Orchestra in London and the Swedish Radio Symphony Orchestra. He was music director of the San Francisco Symphony from 2020 to 2025.

== Life and career ==
=== Early work ===
Born in Helsinki, Finland, Salonen graduated from Helsingin Suomalainen Yhteiskoulu (SYK), one of the top high schools in Finland, in 1977 and then went to study horn and composition at the Sibelius Academy in Helsinki, as well as conducting with Jorma Panula. His conducting classmates included Jukka-Pekka Saraste and Osmo Vänskä. Another classmate on the composition side was the composer Magnus Lindberg and together they formed the new-music appreciation group Korvat auki ("Ears open" in the Finnish language) and the experimental ensemble Toimii (lit. "It works"). Later, Salonen studied with the composers Franco Donatoni, Niccolò Castiglioni, and Einojuhani Rautavaara.

His first experience with conducting came in 1979 with the Finnish Radio Symphony Orchestra, though he still thought of himself principally as a composer; in fact, Salonen has said that he took up conducting primarily to ensure that someone would conduct his own compositions. In 1983, however, he replaced an indisposed Michael Tilson Thomas to conduct a performance of Mahler's Symphony No. 3 with the Philharmonia Orchestra in London on very short notice, without ever having studied the score, and it launched his career as a conductor. He was subsequently principal guest conductor of the Philharmonia from 1985 to 1994.

Salonen was principal conductor of the Swedish Radio Symphony Orchestra from 1984 to 1995. He co-founded the Baltic Sea Festival in 2003 with Michael Tydén and Valery Gergiev. This summer music festival presents new classical music and aims to bring the countries around the Baltic Sea together and to raise awareness of environmental deterioration of the Baltic. It continues to be held annually in one of the region's countries.

=== Los Angeles Philharmonic ===
Salonen made his conducting debut in the United States with the Los Angeles Philharmonic in 1984. He said:

I had no idea what to expect. But the one thing that I didn't expect was when an older player came to talk to me after the first concert and said, "Consider this your future home". Something was going on, because I felt the same. I sensed with an absolute certainty that this orchestra, in whatever way, was going to be a very important part of my life. Always.

In 1989, he was offered the title of principal guest conductor by executive VP Ernest Fleischmann and was to take the orchestra on a tour of Japan; however, controversy ensued when André Previn, the orchestra's music director at the time, was not consulted on either the Principal Guest appointment or the tour, and objected to both. Continued friction between Fleischmann and Previn led to Previn's resignation in April 1989. Four months later, Salonen was named the orchestra's tenth music director, officially taking the post in 1992 and holding it until 2009.

Salonen's tenure with the orchestra began with a residency at the 1992 Salzburg Festival in concert performances and as the pit orchestra in a production of the opera Saint François d'Assise by Olivier Messiaen; it was the first time an American orchestra was given that opportunity. Salonen later took the orchestra on many other tours of the United States, Europe, and Asia, and residencies at the Lucerne Festival in Switzerland, The Proms in London, in Cologne for a festival of Salonen's own works, and in 1996 at the Théâtre du Châtelet in Paris for a Stravinsky festival conducted by Salonen and Pierre Boulez; it was during this Paris residency that key philharmonic board members heard the orchestra perform in improved acoustics and were re-invigorated to lead fundraising efforts to complete construction of Walt Disney Concert Hall.

Under Salonen's leadership, the philharmonic became an extremely progressive and well-regarded orchestra. Alex Ross of The New Yorker said this:

The Salonen era in L.A. may mark a turning point in the recent history of classical music in America. It is a story not of an individual magically imprinting his personality on an institution – what Salonen has called the "empty hype" of conductor worship – but of an individual and an institution bringing out unforeseen capabilities in each other, and thereby proving how much life remains in the orchestra itself, at once the most conservative and the most powerful of musical organisms.

In 2007, Salonen and the orchestra announced the conclusion of his music directorship in 2009, with Gustavo Dudamel taking his place.

Before Salonen's last concert as music director of the Los Angeles Philharmonic on 19 April 2009, the orchestra announced his appointment as its first conductor laureate. In addition, the LA Philharmonic created the Esa-Pekka Salonen Commissions Fund "for the express purpose of supporting the commissioning and performance of new works" as a way to honor his support of contemporary classical music during his tenure as music director. At its inception, it was endowed with $1.5 million.

During Salonen's tenure as music director, the orchestra gave 120 pieces their world or American debuts and commissioned over 54 new works. By the time he stepped down, he had served as music director longer than anyone else in the orchestra's history, leading the orchestra in 973 concerts and 23 tours.

=== Philharmonia Orchestra ===
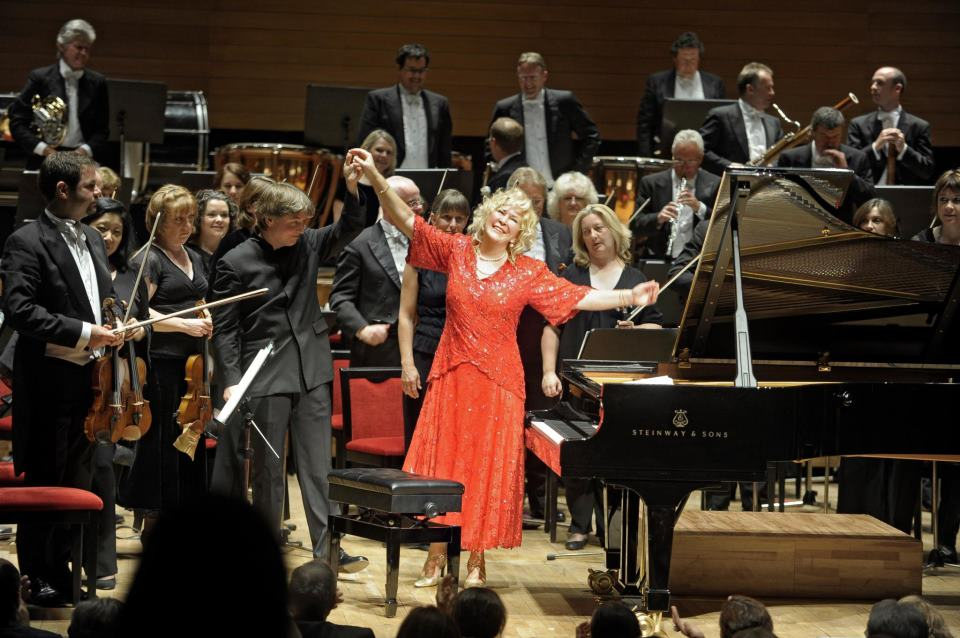
Gülsin Onay with Salonen and the Philharmonia Orchestra in London

In November 2006, the Philharmonia Orchestra announced the appointment of Salonen as principal conductor and artistic advisor at the beginning of the 2008–2009 season. His initial contract was for 3 years. Salonen has conducted several commercial recordings with the Philharmonia, including music of Berlioz and Schönberg. In November 2010, the Philharmonia announced the extension of Salonen's contract to 2014. In September 2013 the orchestra announced the further extension of Salonen's contract through the 2016–2017 season. In December 2018 the Philharmonia announced that Salonen would conclude his principal conductorship of the orchestra after the 2020–2021 season.

Salonen made his Metropolitan Opera conducting debut in November 2009 with the Patrice Chéreau production of Leoš Janáček's From the House of the Dead.

In 2012 his violin concerto written for Leila Josefowicz won the Grawemeyer Award for Music Composition. In March 2014 he was awarded the Michael Ludwig Nemmers Prize in Musical Composition by the Henry and Leigh Bienen School of Music at Northwestern University. The award includes a $100,000 cash prize, a residency of four nonconsecutive weeks at the school over the next two years, and a performance by the Chicago Symphony Orchestra. In the same spring he was also awarded the first creative chair at the Tonhalle Orchester Zürich for the 2014–2015 season. This post included lectures, workshops, but, most significantly, the commissioning of Karawane, a new piece for orchestra and chorus based on Hugo Ball's dada poetry and the performance of nine other Salonen pieces throughout the season.

In autumn 2015 Salonen began a three-season appointment as composer-in-residence of the New York Philharmonic. He serves as an advisor to The Sync Project, a global collaboration seeking to understand and harness music's effect on brain health. In August 2016 Salonen was named the first artist in association with the Finnish National Opera and Ballet.

=== San Francisco Symphony ===
Salonen first guest-conducted the San Francisco Symphony (SFS) in 2004. He returned for guest-conducting appearances in 2012 and 2015. In December 2018 the SFS announced the appointment of Salonen as its next music director, effective with the 2020–2021 season, with an initial contract of five seasons. In March 2024, Salonen announced his departure from the San Francisco Symphony upon the expiration of his contract in 2025, stating that "I do not share the same goals for the future of the institution as the Board of Governors does." Some SFS patrons expressed support for Salonen and displeasure with the board's direction.

=== Orchestre de Paris ===
In September 2025, the Orchestre de Paris announced the appointment of Salonen as its principal conductor, effective with the 2027–2028 season, with an initial contract of five years. Salonen had first guest-conducted the Orchestre de Paris in 1988. In parallel, the Philharmonie de Paris announced the appointment of Salonen to the newly created post of chaire Création et innovation ('creativity and innovation chair'), as of the 2027–2028 season, with an initial contract of five seasons. Also in September 2025, the Los Angeles Philharmonic announced the appointment of Salonen to the new post of creative director, effective in 2026, leading 6 weeks of concerts per year. The orchestra later clarified that the position would be concurrent to the eventual music director hired after Gustavo Dudamel and also to John Adams' role of creative chair, that Salonen would keep his title of conductor laureate, and not be involved in either programming decisions outside his six weeks per season or have any role in filling open chairs within the orchestra.

=== Digital projects ===
Salonen and the Philharmonia Orchestra have worked on multi-disciplinary festivals together, including Woven Words: Music begins where words end to celebrate the centenary of the birth of Witold Lutosławski, Salonen's mentor. They also created the award-winning RE-RITE installation, which was first exhibited in London in 2009 and has since travelled to Portugal, China, Turkey, Germany, and Austria. The digital residency allows members of the public to conduct, play and step inside the Philharmonia Orchestra with Salonen through audio and video projections of musicians performing The Rite of Spring. They followed-up with another installation, Universe of Sound, which was based on Gustav Holst's The Planets, debuted at London's Science Museum, and won the 2012 Royal Philharmonic Society Award for Audiences and Engagement. Salonen and the Philharmonia Orchestra, in partnership with Music Sales Group, Rite Digital, and Touch Press, released a successful iPad app, "The Orchestra". Slate called the interactive tour through orchestral history "the perfect classical music app." In the autumn of 2016 the Philharmonia Orchestra launched a digital takeover of the Southbank Centre, featuring the first major virtual-reality production from a UK symphony orchestra.

=== Apple campaign ===
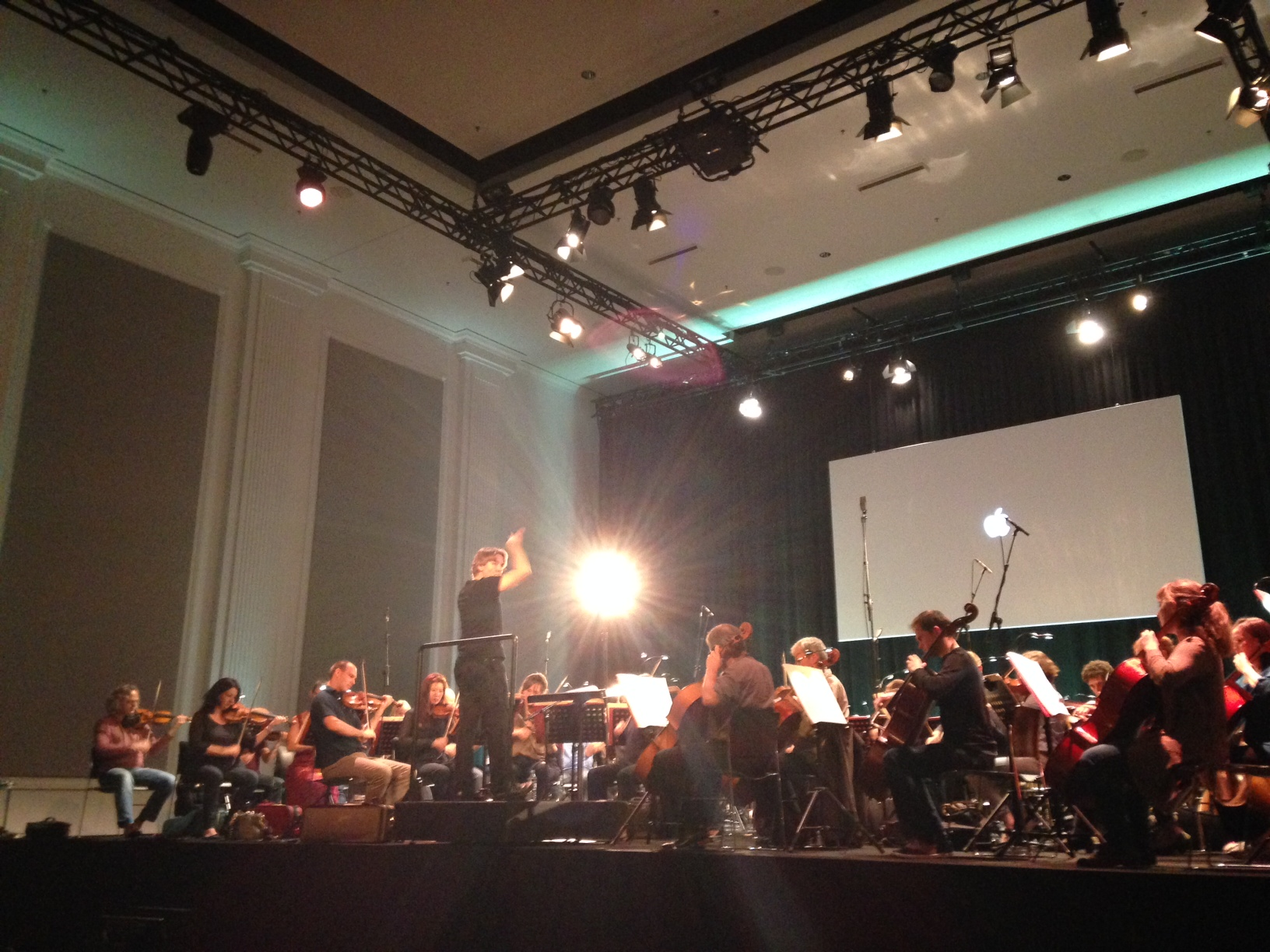
Salonen and the Philharmonia Orchestra perform Lutosławski, Sibelius and Salonen at the Apple Store, Berlin

In 2014 Salonen was part of an international television and web campaign for Apple, promoting iPad Air. The campaign included not only the ad itself, but also discussions with Salonen on classical music, inspiration, and composing. Apple also offered a new and, for a limited time, free recording of Salonen's Grawemeyer prize-winning violin concerto, featuring the violinist Leila Josefowicz and the Philharmonia Orchestra, 20 of Salonen's classical music picks on the iTunes Store classical music page, 15 of Salonen's iPad app picks in the app store, and a guest DJ station on iTunes Radio.

The ad was noted for "the novelty of seeing a contemporary classical composer in a piece of mainstream advertising," for the synchronisation of the video editing with the score, and for the positive portrayal of classical music as compared to its typical pop cultural image. Salonen also led a concert with violinist Leila Josefowicz and the Philharmonia Orchestra in an Apple store in Berlin and spoke about mixing music and technology. It was the first time that a full orchestra had performed in an Apple store.

In the summer of 2015, Salonen spoke on the uses of technology in music education to a group of Apple Distinguished Educators.

=== Personal life ===
Salonen has been married twice. His first marriage was to Jane Price, a former musician with the Philharmonia Orchestra. The couple had three children: daughters Ella Aneira and Anja Sofia, and son Oliver. Salonen and Price separated in 2017 and filed for divorce in June 2018 after 26 years of marriage. Salonen married Kaarina Gould in 2021.

When Igor Stravinsky's former Beverly Hills residence, at 1260 North Wetherly Drive, was put up for sale, Salonen strongly considered buying it. He stated, however, that after visiting the house and noting that indentations from Stravinsky's piano were still visible in the carpet, he was too intimidated by the prospect of trying to compose in the same house where Stravinsky had written such works as Symphony in Three Movements, the Concerto in D for Strings, The Rake's Progress, Orpheus, Agon, the Cantata, and the Mass.

== Honours and awards ==
In April 2010, Salonen was elected a Foreign Honorary Fellow of the American Academy of Arts and Sciences. In May 2010, he was awarded an honorary doctorate degree from the University of Southern California, and later the same day spoke at the graduation ceremony for the USC Thornton School of Music. Salonen carried the Olympic flame on 26 July 2012, as part of the 2012 Summer Olympics torch relay. In December 2020, he was appointed an Honorary Knight Commander of the Order of the British Empire (KBE), for services to music and UK-Finland relations. He was the conductor of the Royal Stockholm Philharmonic Orchestra at the 2023 Nobel Prize Concert. In 2024, he was awarded the Polar Music Prize alongside Nile Rodgers.

In 2025 he received a Grammy Award for the San Francisco Symphony's recording of the opera Adriana Mater, by Kaija Saariaho.

== Career highlights ==
- 1981 – Completed first large scale work, ...auf den ersten Blick und ohne zu wissen...
- 1983 – Co-founded Avanti! Chamber Orchestra in Finland with Jukka-Pekka Saraste
- 1985 – Appointed chief conductor of Swedish Radio Symphony Orchestra
- 1992 – Won the UNESCO International Rostrum of Composers
- 1992 – Became Music Director of Los Angeles Philharmonic
- 1993 – Became the first conductor to receive the prestigious Siena Prize of the Accademia Chigiana
- 1995 – Appointed Artistic Director of Helsinki Festival
- 1997 – Conducted Ligeti's opera, Le Grand Macabre, at the Salzburg Festival with the Philharmonia Orchestra
- 1997 – Gave world premiere of LA Variations in Los Angeles
- 1999 – Music Director of the Ojai Music Festival
- 2000 – Took a sabbatical to concentrate on composing
- 2001 – Was Music Director of the Ojai Music Festival
- 2003 – Gave opening concerts at Walt Disney Concert Hall with the Los Angeles Philharmonic, subsequently televised in the United States on PBS Great Performances
- 2005 – Performed, with the Los Angeles Philharmonic in Los Angeles and Cologne, in festivals of his own compositions
- 2006 – Named "Musician of the Year" by Musical America
- 2007 – "The Tristan Project," performed in Los Angeles and New York
- 2007 – World premiere of his Piano Concerto with Yefim Bronfman (piano) and the New York Philharmonic
- 2008 – Began tenure as principal conductor and artistic advisor of the Philharmonia Orchestra
- 2009 – World premiere of his violin concerto with Leila Josefowicz (violin) and the Los Angeles Philharmonic
- 2011 – Won the 2012 University of Louisville Grawemeyer Award for Music Composition for his Violin Concerto
- 2014 – Won the Nemmers Prize in Music Composition
- 2014 – Named Creative Chair at the Tonhalle-Orchester Zürich
- 2015 – Named Marie-Josée Kravis Composer-in-Residence at the New York Philharmonic
- 2017 – World premiere of his cello concerto with Yo-Yo Ma (cello) and the Chicago Symphony Orchestra
- 2018 – The Colburn School appointed Salonen to lead the Negaunee Conducting Program
- 2020 – Began tenure as music director of the San Francisco Symphony.
- 2022 – Berlin Philharmonic appointed Salonen as composer-in-residence for the 2022/23 season
- 2024 – Won the Polar Music Prize.

== Composing ==
Salonen's compositions include his Concerto for Alto Saxophone and Orchestra (auf den ersten Blick und ohne zu wissen) (1980, with a title taken from Franz Kafka's The Trial), Floof for soprano and ensemble (1982, on texts by Stanisław Lem) and the orchestral L.A. Variations (1996).

Salonen has stated that his time in California has helped him to be more "free" in his compositions. Mark Swed, chief music critic of the Los Angeles Times, described it this way:

When [Salonen] arrived in Los Angeles, he still liked to consider himself a composer-conductor, but the truth was that he had stopped writing music. "The obvious and easy explanation for me to give to people when they were asking why there hadn't been any new pieces for a while was that I had been conducting so much, I had no time," he said. "But that was only half the explanation."

As a European Modernist, Salonen said, he had been inculcated with negatives, such as to avoid melody, harmonic identity and rhythmic pulse. Secretly, though, he was attracted to John Adams, who was then dismissed overseas as being simplistic. "Only after a couple of years here did I begin to see that the European canon I blindly accepted was not the only truth," he said. "Over here, I was able to think about this rule that forbids melody. It's madness. Madness!"

Without a European musical elite looking over his shoulder, Salonen began to feel that it was fine to have his own ideas. "My focus moved from an ideological principle to a pleasure principle" is how he described the composition of his breakthrough piece, "LA Variations," which the Philharmonic premiered in 1997.

Although a work of great intricacy and virtuosity that doesn't ignore Salonen's Modernist training, "LA Variations" builds on rhythmic innovations closer to Adams. The piece proved an immediate hit, so much so that Salonen was stunned by the reaction and then by the score's continuing success – it has been taken up by several other conductors and had more than 80 performances worldwide.

In order to devote more time to composition, Salonen took a year's sabbatical from conducting in 2000, during which time he wrote a work for solo horn (Concert Étude, the competition piece for Lieksa Brass Week), Dichotomie for pianist Gloria Cheng, Mania for the cellist Anssi Karttunen and sinfonietta, and Gambit, an orchestral piece that was a birthday present for fellow composer and friend Magnus Lindberg.

In 2001, Salonen composed Foreign Bodies, his largest work in terms of orchestration, which incorporated music from the opening movement of Dichotomie. Another orchestral piece, Insomnia, followed in 2002, and another, Wing on Wing, in 2004. Wing on Wing includes parts for two sopranos and distorted samples of architect Frank Gehry's voice as well as a fish.

As is apparent with his interpretations of such avant-garde works as Jan Sandström's Motorbike Odyssey, Salonen voices a distaste for ideological and dogmatic approaches to composition and sees music creation as deeply physical. In the liner notes for Deutsche Grammophon's release of Wing On Wing, he is quoted saying "Musical expression is bodily expression, there is no abstract cerebral expression in my opinion. It all comes out of the body." A recurring theme in his music is the fusion of or relationship between the mechanical and the organic.

Salonen has among his intended composing projects a proposed opera based on the novel The Woman and the Ape by Peter Høeg.

== Compositions ==
World premiere details shown where available, Salonen conducting unless otherwise shown

=== Orchestral ===
- Giro (1982, rev. 1997), premiered by Tampere Philharmonic Orchestra; Finland, 27 November 1981
- L.A. Variations (1996), premiered by Los Angeles Philharmonic; Los Angeles, 16 January 1997
- Gambit (1998), premiered by Netherlands Radio Symphony Orchestra; Amsterdam, 6 June 1998
- Foreign Bodies (2001), premiered by Finnish Radio Symphony Orchestra, Jukka-Pekka Saraste; Schleswig-Holstein Festival, Kiel, 12 August 2001
- Insomnia (2002), premiered by NHK Symphony Orchestra; Tokyo, 1 December 2002
- Stockholm Diary (2004), premiered by Stockholm Royal Philharmonic Orchestra; Stockholm, Composer Festival, 27 October 2004
- Helix (2005), premiered by World Orchestra for Peace, Valery Gergiev; London, 29 August 2005
- Nyx (2010), premiered by Orchestre Philharmonique de Radio France; Paris, 19 February 2011
- Gemini (2018/2019), premiered by Los Angeles Philharmonic; Los Angeles, 26 October 2019 (consists of two originally independent pieces Pollux and Castor)
- Tiu (2023), premiered by Los Angeles Philharmonic; Los Angeles, 27 October 2023

=== Concertante ===
- Saxophone Concerto (1980), premiered by Finnish Radio Symphony Orchestra, Pekka Savijoki, saxophone; Helsinki, 22 September 1981
- Mimo II for oboe and orchestra (1992), premiered by Finnish Radio Symphony Orchestra, Jorma Valjakka, oboe; Helsinki, 14 December 1992
- Mania for cello and orchestra (2002), orchestra version of "Mania for Cello and Chamber Ensemble"
- Piano Concerto (2007), premiered by New York Philharmonic, Yefim Bronfman, piano; New York, 1 February 2007
- Violin Concerto (2009), premiered by Los Angeles Philharmonic, Leila Josefowicz, violin; Los Angeles, 9 April 2009
- Cello Concerto (2017), premiered by Chicago Symphony Orchestra, Yo-Yo Ma, cello; Chicago, 15 March 2017
- kínēma for clarinet and string orchestra (2021), premiered by Finnish Radio Symphony Orchestra, Christoffer Sundqvist, clarinet; Helsinki, 15 December 2021
- Sinfonia concertante for organ and orchestra (2022), premiered by Polish National Radio Symphony Orchestra, Iveta Apkalna, organ; Katowice, 13 January 2023
- Horn Concerto (2025), Asia premiere by Hong Kong Philharmonic Orchestra, Stefan Dohr, horn; Hong Kong, 1 May 2026

=== Choral/Vocal ===
- Floof (Songs of a Homeostatic Homer) (1988) for soprano and chamber ensemble, premiered by Toimii Ensemble, Anu Komsi, soprano; Helsinki, 27 August 1988
- Five Images after Sappho (1999) for soprano and chamber ensemble, premiered by Los Angeles Philharmonic New Music Group, Laura Claycomb, soprano; Ojai, California, 4 June 1999
- Two Songs from Kalender Röd (2000) for SATB chorus, premiered by Swedish Radio Choir, Stefan Parkman; Stockholm, 2 December 2000
- Wing on Wing for two sopranos and orchestra (2004), premiered by Los Angeles Philharmonic; Jamie Chamberlin and Hila Plitmann, sopranos; 5 June 2004
- Dona Nobis Pacem (2011) for SATB chorus, premiered at Chatelet Theatre, 4 February 2011
- Iri da iri (2014) for SATB chorus, premiered by Los Angeles Master Chorale, Grant Gershon; Los Angeles, 8 June 2014
- Karawane (2014), premiered by the Tonhalle Orchestra Zurich and Zurich Singing Academy, Lionel Bringuier; Tonhalle Zürich, 10 September 2014
- Laila (2020) for SATB chorus and percussion; Helsinki, 21 August 2020

=== Chamber/Instrumental ===
- Nachtlieder for clarinet and piano (1978)
- Meeting for clarinet and harpsichord (1982), premiered by Seppo Salovaara, clarinet and Jukka Tiensuu, harpsichord; Helsinki, 14 December 1982
- Yta I for alto flute (1982)
- Yta II for piano/harpsichord (1985)
- Yta III for cello (1986)
- Second Meeting for oboe and piano (1992), premiered by Bengt Rosengren, oboe and Stefan Bojsten, piano; Stockholm, 23 February 1992
- Mania for cello and chamber ensemble (2000), premiered by Avanti! Chamber Orchestra, Anssi Karttunen, cello, Summer Sounds; Porvoo, 2 July 2000
- Concert étude for horn (2000)
- Dichotomie for piano (2000), premiered by Gloria Cheng, piano; Los Angeles, 4 December 2000
- Lachen verlernt for violin (2002), premiered by Cho-Liang Lin, violin; La Jolla, California, La Jolla SummerFest, 10 August 2002
- Memoria for wind quintet (2003), premiered by Avanti! Chamber Orchestra; Helsinki Conservatory, 30 November 2003
- Invenzione and Chorale for piano (2004), premiered by Paul Crossley, piano; Wigmore Hall, London, 17 May 2004
- Catch and Release for chamber ensemble (2006), premiered by Avanti! Chamber Orchestra; Crusell Music Festival, Uusikaupunki, Finland, 26 July 2006
- Homunculus for string quartet (2007), premiered by The Johannes String Quartet; Champaign-Urbana, Illinois, USA, 7 February 2008
- knock, breathe, shine for cello (2010)
- Pentatonic étude for viola (2008/14), premiered by Lawrence Power, viola; Wigmore Hall, London, 12 February 2015
- Six Preludes, for piano (2004-16)
- FOG for 13 instrumentalists (2019), premiered by Colburn School of Music; Los Angeles, 2 February 2019
- objets trouvés viola and drone (2020)
- Saltat sobrius: Fantasy upon Sederunt Principes for 10 stringed instruments (2020), premiered by members of the San Francisco Symphony; San Francisco, 15 April 2021
- Arabesques for Olly for cello and drone (2022)
- Drømmelogikk for violin and cello (2026), premiered by Eldbjørg Hemsing, violin, Amalie Stalheim, cello; Bergen International Music Festival, Bergen, Norway, 30 May 2026

== Selected world premiere performances ==
In addition to conducting his own compositions, Salonen has actively championed other composers' music, most notably Anders Hillborg, Magnus Lindberg, Kaija Saariaho, and Steven Stucky. Many noteworthy compositions have even been dedicated to Salonen. Below is a list of some of the world premieres that he has conducted:

John Adams

- Naïve and Sentimental Music, Los Angeles Philharmonic (19 February 1999)
- The Dharma at Big Sur, Tracy Silverman (electric violin), Los Angeles Philharmonic (24 October 2003)

Samuel Adams

- Chamber Concerto, Karen Gomyo (violin), Chicago Symphony Orchestra (May 2018)

Louis Andriessen

- Haags Hakkûh (The Hague Hacking) – Double Piano Concerto, Katia and Marielle Labèque (pianos), Los Angeles Philharmonic (16 January 2009)

Anna Clyne

- Within Her Arms for string orchestra, Los Angeles Philharmonic (7 April 2009)

John Corigliano

- The Red Violin (motion picture score), Joshua Bell (violin), Philharmonia Orchestra

Franco Donatoni

- Esa (in Cauda V), Los Angeles Philharmonic (16 February 2001)

Richard Dubugnon

- Violin Concerto, Janine Jansen, Orchestre de Paris (17 December 2008)

Anders Hillborg

- Clang and Fury, Swedish Radio Symphony Orchestra
- Celestial mechanics Stockholm Chamber Orchestra (31 October 1986)
- Liquid marble, Orkester Norden, (Tampere 1995)
- Meltdown Variations, Los Angeles Philharmonic New Music Group (1999)
- Dreaming Rivers, Royal Stockholm Philharmonic (1999)
- Piano Concerto (revised version) Roland Pöntinen and the AVANTI! Chamber Orchestra
- Eleven Gates, Los Angeles Philharmonic (4 May 2006)
- Flood Dreams, Swedish Radio Symphony Orchestra (Brussels, 2009)
- Sirens, Anne Sofie von Otter and the Los Angeles Philharmonic (2011)

William Kraft

- The Grand Encounter, English Horn Concerto, Carolyn Hove (English horn), Los Angeles Philharmonic (16 January 2003)

Peter Lieberson

- Neruda Songs, Lorraine Hunt Lieberson (mezzo-soprano), Los Angeles Philharmonic (20 May 2005), winner: 2008 Grawemeyer Award (Music Composition)

Magnus Lindberg

- Kraft for solo ensemble & orchestra, Finnish Radio Orchestra and the Toimii ensemble (4 September 1985)
- Campana in Aria for horn and orchestra, Hans Dullaert (horn), Radio Filharmonisch Orkest Holland (June 1998)
- Fresco for orchestra, Los Angeles Philharmonic, (1998)
- Cello Concerto No. 1, Anssi Karttunen (cello), Orchestre de Paris (May 1999)
- Chorale for orchestra, Philharmonia Orchestra (2002)
- Parada for orchestra, Philharmonia Orchestra (6 February 2002)
- Sculpture for orchestra, Los Angeles Philharmonic, (6 October 2005)
- Cello Concerto No. 2, Anssi Karttunen (cello), Los Angeles Philharmonic (18 October 2013)

Larry Lipkis

- "Harlequin" for bass trombone and orchestra, Jeffrey Reynolds (bass trombone), David Weiss, Los Angeles Philharmonic (23 May 1997)

Steven Mackey

- "Deal" for electric guitar and large ensemble, Bill Frisell (guitar), Joey Baron (drums), Los Angeles Philharmonic New Music Group (17 April 1995)

Colin Matthews

- Horn Concerto, Richard Watkins (horn), Philharmonia Orchestra (April 2001)

David Newman

- Tales from 1001 Nights with film by Yoshitaka Amano, Los Angeles Philharmonic (30 April 1998)

Gabriela Ortiz

- Altar de Piedra, concerto for percussion ensemble & orchestra, Kroumata (percussion), Los Angeles Philharmonic, January 2003

Arvo Pärt

- Symphony No. 4, Los Angeles, Los Angeles Philharmonic (10 January 2009)

Joseph Phibbs

- Rivers to the Sea, Philharmonia Orchestra (22 June 2012)

Bernard Rands

- Symphony, Los Angeles Philharmonic (24 February 1994)

Roger Reynolds

- Symphony (The Stages of Life), Los Angeles Philharmonic (29 April 1993)

Kaija Saariaho

- Du Cristal, Finnish Radio Symphony Orchestra (September 1990)
- "…a la fumée," Petri Alanko (alto flute) and Anssi Karttunen (cello), Finnish Radio Symphony Orchestra (March 1991)
- Graal Théâtre for violin and orchestra, Gidon Kremer (violin), BBC Symphony Orchestra (September 1995)
- Adriana Mater, Orchestra & Choir of the Paris Opera (April 2006)

Rodion Shchedrin

- Piano Concerto No. 5, Olli Mustonen (piano), Los Angeles Philharmonic (21 October 1999)

Dmitri Shostakovich

- Prologue to Orango (orchestration by Gerard McBurney), Ryan McKinny (Veselchak, bass-baritone), Jordan Bisch (Voice from the Crowd/Bass, bass), Michael Fabiano (Zoologist, tenor), Eugene Brancoveanu (Orango, baritone), Yulia Van Doren (Susanna, soprano), Timur Bekbosunov (Paul Mash, tenor), Los Angeles Master Chorale (Grant Gershon, music director), Los Angeles Philharmonic (2 December 2011)

Roberto Sierra

- "Con madera, metal y cuero" for percussion soloist and orchestra, Evelyn Glennie (percussion), Los Angeles Philharmonic (21 January 1999)

Steven Stucky

- Music for the Funeral of Queen Mary (after Purcell), for wind ensemble (February 1992)
- Concerto for Two Flutes and Orchestra, Anne Diener-Zentner (fka Anne Diener-Giles) and Janet Ferguson (flutes), Los Angeles Philharmonic (23 February 1995)
- Ancora, Los Angeles Philharmonic (5 October 1995)
- American Muse, Sanford Sylvan (baritone), Los Angeles Philharmonic (29 October 1999)
- Second Concerto for Orchestra, Los Angeles Philharmonic (12 March 2004) (Winner: 2005 Pulitzer Prize for Music)
- Radical Light, Los Angeles Philharmonic (18 October 2007)

Augusta Read Thomas

- Canticle Weaving: Trombone Concerto #2, Ralph Sauer (trombone), Los Angeles Philharmonic (29 March 2003)

Mark-Anthony Turnage

- From the Wreckage for trumpet and orchestra, Håkan Hardenberger (trumpet), Helsinki Philharmonic Orchestra (5 September 2005)
- From All Sides, Chicago Symphony and Hubbard Street Dance Chicago (25 January 2007)

== Recordings ==
Salonen is noted for his dedication to performing and recording contemporary music. His 1985 recording of Witold Lutosławski's Symphony No. 3 won the 1985 Gramophone Award, the Grammy Award, and a Caecilia Prize for Best Contemporary Recording. He later recorded Lutosławski's Symphony No. 4 with the Los Angeles Philharmonic, once for Sony Classical, and later in a live recording at Walt Disney Concert Hall for Deutsche Grammophon. He also worked with the Philharmonia Orchestra to record the complete works of György Ligeti for Sony Classical, but the project was left unfinished due to lack of funding.

=== Best-known recordings ===
- Esa-Pekka Salonen: Concerto for Alto Saxophone; Floof; Meeting; Nachtleider; Mimo II; Yta I; Yta II; Yta IIb; Yta III – Pekka Savijoki; Anu Komsi; Kari Krikku; Jukka Tiensuu; Jorma Valjakka; Mikael Helasvuo; Tuija Hakkila; Anssi Karttunen; Finnish Radio Symphony Orchestra; Avanti! Chamber Orchestra; Esa-Pekka Salonen – Finlandia 0927 43815 2
- Bartók: Piano Concertos 1, 2, and 3 (Yefim Bronfman, piano) (Grammy Award); Sony Classical SBK89732
- Esa-Pekka Salonen: Five Images After Sappho; Gambit; Giro; LA Variations; Mania – Dawn Upshaw; Anssi Karttunen; Los Angeles Philharmonic Orchestra; London Sinfonietta; Esa-Pekka Salonen – Sony SK89158
- Esa-Pekka Salonen: Foreign Bodies; Insomnia; Wing on Wing – Anu Komsi; Piia Komsi; Finnish Radio Symphony Orchestra; Esa-Pekka Salonen – Deutsche Grammophon 477 5375
- John Corigliano: Red Violin – Joshua Bell, solo violin; Philarmonia Orchestra; Sony Classical SK63010
- Arnold Schoenberg: Violin Concerto in D Minor, Jean Sibelius: Violin Concerto – Hilary Hahn, solo violin; Swedish Radio Symphony Orchestra – Deutsche Grammophon B0011WMWUW – Grammy Award for Best Instrumental Soloist(s) Performance (with orchestra)
- Henri Dutilleux: Correspondances; Tout un monde lointain; The shadows of time – Barbara Hannigan; Anssi Karttunen; Orchestre Philharmonique de Radio France – Deutsche Grammophon 0289 479 1180 7
- Esa-Pekka Salonen: Out of Nowhere; Nyx and Violin Concerto; Leila Josefowicz; Finnish Radio Symphony Orchestra; Esa-Pekka Salonen; Deutsche Grammophon B008W5TDP8

=== With Los Angeles Philharmonic ===
Deutsche Grammophon

- Bartók: Suite, The Miraculous Mandarin
- Mussorgsky: St. John's Night on the Bare Mountain (original version)
- Salonen: Helix
- Salonen: Piano Concerto (Yefim Bronfman, piano)
- Shostakovich (orchestration by Gerard McBurney): Prologue to Orango—Ryan McKinny (Veselchak, bass-baritone), Jordan Bisch (Voice from the Crowd/Bass, bass), Michael Fabiano (Zoologist, tenor), Eugene Brancoveanu (Orango, baritone), Yulia Van Doren (Susanna, soprano), Timur Bekbosunov (Paul Mash, tenor), Los Angeles Master Chorale (Grant Gershon, music director) (world premiere recording)
- Shostakovich: Symphony No. 4 in C minor, Op. 43
- Stravinsky: The Rite of Spring

DG Concerts — recorded live at Walt Disney Concert Hall

- Beethoven: Symphony No. 5
- Beethoven: Symphony No. 7
- Beethoven: Symphony No. 8
- Beethoven: Overture, Leonore No. 2
- Debussy: La mer
- Falla: El amor brujo
- Anders Hillborg: Eleven Gates (world premiere recording)
- Hindemith: Symphonic Metamorphoses on Themes of Weber
- Husa: Music for Prague 1968
- Ligeti: Concert românesc
- Lutosławski: Concerto for Orchestra
- Lutosławski: Symphony No. 4
- Mosolov: Iron Foundry
- Pärt: Symphony No. 4, "Los Angeles" (world premiere recording)
- Prokofiev: Suite from Romeo & Juliet
- Ravel: Ma mère l'Oye
- Ravel: Piano Concerto for the Left Hand in D (Jean-Yves Thibaudet, piano)
- Salonen: Helix
- Sibelius: Symphony No. 2 in D major for orchestra, Op. 43
- Shostakovich: Music from Lady Macbeth of Mtensk District
- Shostakovich: Suite from The Nose
- Stravinsky: The Firebird
- Wagner: Die Meistersinger von Nürnberg, Prelude
- Wagner: Die Meistersinger von Nürnberg, "Was duftet doch der Flieder" (Bryn Terfel, bass-baritone)
- Wagner: Die Walküre, The Ride of the Valkyries
- Wagner: Die Walküre, Wotan's Farewell and Magic Fire Music (Bryn Terfel, bass-baritone)
- Wagner: Lohengrin, Prelude to Act III
- Wagner: Tannhäuser, "O du, mein holder Abendstern" (Bryn Terfel, bass-baritone)

ECM

- Pärt: Symphony No. 4, "Los Angeles"

Nonesuch

- Adams: Naïve and Sentimental Music

Ondine

- Saariaho: Du cristal ...
- Saariaho: ... à la fumée (Petri Alanko, alto flute; Anssi Karttunen, cello)

Philips Classics

- Bartók: Violin Concerto No. 2 (Viktoria Mullova, violin)
- Stravinsky: Violin Concerto (Viktoria Mullova, violin)

Sony Classical

- Bach: Transcriptions (by Elgar, Mahler, Schoenberg, Stokowski, Webern)
- Bartók: Concerto for Orchestra
- Bartók: Music for Strings, Percussion, and Celesta
- Bartók: Concerto for Piano No. 1, Sz. 83 (Yefim Bronfman, piano)
- Bartók: Concerto for Piano No. 2, Sz. 95 (Yefim Bronfman, piano)
- Bartók: Concerto for Piano No. 3, Sz. 119 (Yefim Bronfman, piano)
- Bruckner: Symphony No. 4, "Romantic"
- Debussy: Prélude à l'après-midi d'un faune (Janet Ferguson, flute)
- Debussy: La mer
- Debussy: Images pour orchestre
- Debussy: Trois nocturnes (Women of the Los Angeles Master Chorale)
- Debussy: Le martyre de St. Sébastien (Fragments symphoniques)
- Debussy: La Damoiselle élue (Dawn Upshaw, soprano; Paula Rasmussen, mezzo-soprano; Women of the Los Angeles Master Chorale)
- Goldmark: Concerto for Violin and Orchestra (Joshua Bell, violin)
- Hermann: Excerpts, Torn Curtain
- Hermann: Overture, North by Northwest
- Hermann: Prelude, The Man Who Knew Too Much
- Hermann: Suite, Psycho
- Hermann: Suite, Marnie
- Hermann: Suite, Vertigo
- Hermann: Suite, Fahrenheit 451
- Hermann: Suite, Taxi Driver
- Hindemith: Mathis der Maler (symphony)
- Hindemith: Symphonic Metamorphosis on Themes of Weber
- Hindemith: The Four Temperaments (Emanuel Ax, piano)
- Lutosławski: Symphony No. 1
- Lutosławski: Symphony No. 2
- Lutosławski: Symphony No. 3
- Lutosławski: Symphony No. 4
- Lutosławski: Piano Concerto (Paul Crossley, piano)
- Lutosławski: Chantefleurs et Chantefables (Dawn Upshaw, soprano)
- Lutosławski: Fanfare for Los Angeles Philharmonic
- Lutosławski: Les Espaces du sommeil (John Shirley-Quirk, baritone)
- Mahler: Symphony No. 3 (Anna Larsson, contralto; Ralph Sauer, trombone; Donald Green, posthorn; Martin Chalifour, violin; Paulist Boy Choristers of California, Women of the Los Angeles Master Chorale)
- Mahler: Symphony No. 4 (Barbara Hendricks, soprano)
- Mahler: Das Lied von der Erde (Plácido Domingo, tenor; Bo Skovhus, baritone)
- Wynton Marsalis: All Rise (Wynton Marsalis, trumpet; Lincoln Center Jazz Orchestra; Paul Smith Singers; Northridge Singers of California State University; Morgan State University Choir)
- Prokofiev: Violin Concertos Nos. 1 and 2 (Cho-Liang Lin, violin)
- Revueltas: Homenaje a Federico García Lorca
- Revueltas: La noche de los mayas
- Revueltas: Ocho por radio
- Revueltas: Sensemayá
- Revueltas: Ventanas for Large Orchestra
- Revueltas: First Little Serious Piece
- Revueltas: Second Little Serious Piece
- Salonen: Gambit
- Salonen: Giro
- Salonen: LA Variations
- Shostakovich: Piano Concerto No. 1 (Yefim Bronfman, piano; Thomas Stevens, trumpet)
- Shostakovich: Piano Concerto No. 2 (Yefim Bronfman, piano)
- Shostakovich: Quintet for piano and strings, Op. 57 (Yefim Bronfman, piano, Juilliard String Quartet)
- Sibelius: Finlandia
- Sibelius: The Swan of Tuonela
- Sibelius: Valse Triste
- Sibelius: Concerto for Violin and Orchestra (Cho-Liang Lin, violin)
- Sibelius: Concerto for Violin and Orchestra (Joshua Bell, violin)
- Sibelius: En saga
- Sibelius: Kullervo Symphony, Op. 7 (Marianna Rorholm, mezzo-soprano; Jorma Hynninen, baritone; Helsinki University Men's Chorus)
- Sibelius: Lemminkäinen Legends, Op. 22 (Four Legends from the Kalevala)
- Stravinsky: Violin Concerto (Cho-Liang Lin, violin)

Zappa Records

- Frank Zappa: 200 Motels: The Suites

=== Other orchestras ===
Philharmonia recordings

- Dmitri Shostakovich: Prologue to "Orango" (World Premiere Recording) and Symphony No 4
- Gustav Mahler: Symphony No 9
- Gustav Mahler: Symphony No 6
- Hector Berlioz: Symphonie Fantastique, Ludwig van Beethoven: Leonore Overture
- Arnold Schoenberg: Gurrelieder
- Franz Liszt: Piano Concertos 1 & 2 and Sonata in B minor (Emanuel Ax, piano)
- Sergei Rachmaninov: Piano Concertos 2 & 3 (Yefim Bronfman, piano)
- Magnus Lindberg: Cantigas, Cello Concerto, Parada, & Fresco (Anssi Karttunen, cello)
- Igor Stravinsky: The Firebird & The Rite of Spring
- György Ligeti: Le Grand Macabre
- György Ligeti: Vocal Works (The King's Singers)
- Arnold Schoenberg: Piano Concerto, Op. 42, Franz Liszt: Piano Concertos 1 & 2 (Emanuel Ax, piano)
- Igor Stravinsky: Petrouchka & Orpheus
- Igor Stravinsky: Le sacre du printemps & Symphony in Three Movements
- André Jolivet: Concerto No 2 for trumpet & Concertino for trumpet, string orchestra & piano, Henri Tomasi: Concerto for trumpet & orchestra (Wynton Marsalis, trumpet)
- Olivier Messiaen: Turangalîla-Symphonie, Witold Lutosławski: Symphony No 3 (Los Angeles Philharmonic Orchestra, Paul Crossley, piano, John Shirley-Quirk, baritone)
- Jean Sibelius: Symphony No 5, Op, 82 and Pohjola's Daughter, Op. 49

San Francisco Symphony recordings

- Béla Bartók: Piano Concerto No. 1 (Pierre-Laurent Aimard, piano)
- Béla Bartók: Piano Concerto No. 2 (Pierre-Laurent Aimard, piano)
- Béla Bartók: Piano Concerto No. 3 (Pierre-Laurent Aimard, piano)
- Anders Hillborg: Kongsgaard Variations
- György Ligeti: Clocks and Clouds
- György Ligeti: Lux Aeterna
- György Ligeti: Ramifications
- Elizabeth Ogonek: Sleep & Unremembrance
- Ottorino Respighi: Pines of Rome
- Jean Sibelius: Symphony No. 5
- Igor Stravinsky: The Rite of Spring

Oslo Philharmonic recordings

- Grieg: Peer Gynt, with Barbara Hendricks, Sony Classical Masters, SK 44528, 1993

Berlin Philharmonic Orchestra recordings

- Sergei Prokofiev: Romeo & Juliet

Finnish Radio Symphony Orchestra recordings

- Kaija Saariaho: La Passion de Simone (Dawn Upshaw, soprano, Tapiola Chamber Choir)
- Magnus Lindberg: Piano Concerto & Kraft (Toimii Ensemble)
- Kaija Saariaho: Château de l'âme, Graal Théâtre & Amers (BBC Symphony Orchestra, Avanti! Chamber Orchestra, Finnish Radio Chamber Choir, Dawn Upshaw, soprano, Gidon Kremer, violin, Anssi Karttunen, cello)
- Magnus Lindberg: Kinetics (Pekka Savijoko, alto saxophone)
- Magnus Lindberg: Metalwork, Ablauf, Twine, Kinetics, & Jeax d'Anches
- Magnus Lindberg: Kinetics, Esa-Pekka Salonen: Concerto for Alto Saxophone & Orchestra, Jouni Kaipainen: Sinfonia (BBC Symphony Orchestra, Pekka Savijoki, alto saxophone)

Swedish Radio Symphony Orchestra recordings

- Igor Stravinsky: The Rake's Progress (Barbara Hendricks, soprano, Håkan Hagegård, actor, Greg Fedderly, tenor)
- Carl Nielsen: Violin Concerto, Jean Sibelius: Violin Concerto (Philharmonia Orchestra, Cho-Liang Lin, violin)
- Carl Nielsen: Symphony No. 1 and Little Suite (Stockholm Chamber Orchestra)
- Arvo Pärt: Credo (Hélène Grimaud, piano)
- Anders Hillborg: Clarinet Concerto, Liquid Marble, & Violin Concerto (Martin Fröst, clarinet, Anna Lindal, violin)
- Luigi Dallapiccola: Il Prigioniero & Canti di Prigiona
- Magnus Lindberg: Action, Situation, Signification, & Kraft (Toimii Ensemble)
- Clang & Fury Anders Hillborg: Muoocaaeyiywcoum, Lamento, Celestial Mechanics, & Haut-Posaune (Stockholm Chamber Orchestra, Eric Ericson Chamber Choir, Kari Kriikku, clarinet, Christian Lindberg, trombone, Anna Lindal, violin, Martin Fröst, clarinet)
- Igor Stravinsky: Oedipus Rex (Eric Ericson Chamber Choir)
- Lars-Erik Larsson: God in Disguise, Pastoral Suite, & Violin Concerto (Arve Tellefsen, violin, Hillevi Martinpelto, soprano, Håkan Hagegård, baritone)
- Carl Nielsen: Flute Concerto, Clarinet Concerto, Rhapsody Overture, Saul & David, & Springtime in Funen (Håkan Rosengren, clarinet, Per Flemström, flute)
- Franz Berwald: Symphonies 3 & 4 (Los Angeles Philharmonic Orchestra)
- Wilhelm Stenhammar: Serenade, Op. 31, Midwinter, Op. 24, Chitra, Op. 43
- Esa-Pekka Salonen: Mimo II (Bengt Rosengren, oboe)
- Carl Nielsen: Symphonies 3 & 6 (Pia-Marie Nilsson, soprano, Olle Persson, baritone)
- A Nordic Festival: Hugo Alfvén: Swedish Rhapsody No 1 Midsommarvaka & Bergakungen, Jean Sibelius: Valse Triste & Finlandia, Edvard Grieg: Sigurd Jorsalfar, Jón Leifs: Geysir, Carl Nielsen: Maskarade, Armas Järnefelt: Berceuse
- Carl Nielsen: Symphony No. 4 and Helios Overture
- Carl Nielsen: Symphony No. 5 and Masquerade Overture

Avanti! Chamber Orchestra recordings

- The Virtuoso Clarinet (Kari Kriikku, clarinet)
- Magnus Lindberg: De Tartuffe, Je crois, Linea d'ombra, Zona, & Ritratto
- Aarre Merikanto: 10 Pieces for Orchestra, Paavo Heininen: Musique d'été, Op. 11, Magnus Lindberg: Rittrato (other conductors: Jukka-Pekka Saraste and Ari Angervo)

London Sinfonietta recordings

- Magnus Lindberg: Away, Amanhacendo Liberdade, Circle Wind, Deusa, Sky Dance, Asa Delta, Rapaziada, Nightflower, Save the Earth (Endymion (ensemble))
- Paul Hindemith: Kammermusik No. 3, Op. 36, No. 2, Aarre Merikanto: Konzertstück, Magnus Lindberg: Zona, Bernd Alois Zimmermann: Canto di Speranza (Anssi Karttunen, cello)
- Toru Takemitsu: To the Edge of Dream, Toward the Sea, Vers, L'Arc-en-Ciel, Palma, & Folios for Guitar
- Igor Stravinsky: Pulcinella, Octet, Renard, & Ragtime
- Olivier Messiaen: Des canyons aux étoiles, Couleurs de la cité céleste, & Oiseaux exotiques (Paul Crossley, piano)
- Igor Stravinsky: Concerto for piano & wind instruments, Capriccio for piano & orchestra, Movements for piano & orchestra, & Symphonies of wind instruments (Paul Crossley, piano)

Stockholm Chamber Orchestra recordings

- Arnold Schoenberg: Transfigured Night, Op. 4 & String Quartet No. 2 (Faye Robinson, soprano)
- Pär Lindgren: Fragments of a Circle, Bowijaw, Shadows that in the Darkness Dwell, & Guggi-guggi for trombone & tape
- Igor Stravinsky: Apollon Musagète, Concerto in D, & Cantata (London Sinfonietta, (orchestra & chorus), Ulf Forsberg, violin, Yvonne Kenny, soprano, John Aler, tenor)
- Joseph Haydn: Symphonies 22, 78 & 82
- Richard Strauss: Prelude to Capriccio, Op. 85, Concertino for clarinet, bassoon & string orchestra, & Metamorphosen (Paul Meyer (clarinetist), Knut Sonstevold, bassoon)

Stockholm Sinfonietta recordings

- A Swedish Serenade: Dag Wirén: Serenade for Strings, Op. 11, Lars-Erik Larsson: Little Serenade for Strings, Op. 12, Lille Bror Söderlundh: Concertino for oboe & strings, Ingvar Lidholm: Music for Strings

Staatskapelle Dresden recordings

- Robert Schumann: Piano Concerto in A minor, Op. 54, Clara Schumann: 3 Lieder, Op. 12 & Am Strande, Johannes Brahms: Sonata for cello & piano, No. 1, Op. 38 & 2 Rhapsodies, Op. 79 (Hélène Grimaud, piano)

Finnish National Opera recordings

- Stravinsky – Perséphone. Esa-Pekka Salonen, Andrew Staples, Pauline Cheviller, Finnish National Opera. PENTATONE PTC 5186688 (2018)
- Kaija Saariaho: L'Amour de loin (Peter Sellers, director, Dawn Upshaw, soprano, Monica Groop, mezzo-soprano, Gerald Finley, baritone)

Other recordings of Salonen works

- Leila Josefowicz, violin, plays Salonen: Lachen verlernt
- Gloria Cheng, piano, plays Salonen: Yta II, Three Preludes, & Dichotomie
- Lin Jiang, horn and Benjamin Martin, piano, play Salonen: Hornmusic 1

Cultural offices
Preceded by Herbert Blomstedt	Principal Conductor, Swedish Radio Symphony Orchestra; 1984–1995	Succeeded by Yevgeny Svetlanov
