= Violin Concerto (Salonen) =

2009 concerto by Esa-Pekka Salonen

The Violin Concerto is the only violin concerto by the Finnish conductor and composer Esa-Pekka Salonen. It was finished in 2009 and has become one of Salonen's major works.

== Composition ==
The Concerto is the result of a collaboration between Salonen and Canadian violinist Leila Josefowicz, when his position as the conductor of the Los Angeles Philharmonic was coming to an end after 17 years. It was commissioned by The Los Angeles Philharmonic Association, among others. In the Concerto, Salonen tries to sum up everything that he has learned as the music director of the orchestra. In a metaphorical sense, according to Salonen, "it is not a coincidence that the last movement is called Adieu". The concerto was premiered on April 9, 2009, only a few days before the Los Angeles Philharmonic appointed Salonen as its first ever Conductor Laureate. The premiere was performed by Leila Josefowicz and the Los Angeles Philharmonic under the baton of Salonen. The violin concerto won the 2012 Grawemeyer Prize. It was published by Chester Music Limited.

== Structure ==
The concerto is in four movements and takes around half an hour to perform. The movement list is as follows:

1. Mirage
2. Pulse I
3. Pulse II
4. Adieu

In addition to the solo violin, the work is scored for three flutes (2nd doubling alto flute, 3rd doubling piccolo), two oboes, one cor anglais, two clarinets, one bass clarinet, one contrabass clarinet, two bassoons, one contrabassoon, two horns in F, two trumpets in C, two trombones, timpani, a medium-sized percussion group formed by a vibraphone, a bass drum, a glockenspiel, a high-pitched log drum, a marimba, four tom-toms, one tam-tam, tuned gongs, and one large drumset, harp, celesta, and the usual set of strings, made up of twelve first violins, twelve second violins, ten violas, eight cellos, and eight double basses

== Notable recordings ==
Among the most well-known recordings of the Violin Concerto is the version by violinist Leila Josefowicz, with Esa-Pekka Salonen and the Finnish Radio Symphony Orchestra. It was released on CD in 2012 by Deutsche Grammophon, together with Nyx.
