= Anu Kaipainen =

Finnish writer (1933–2009)

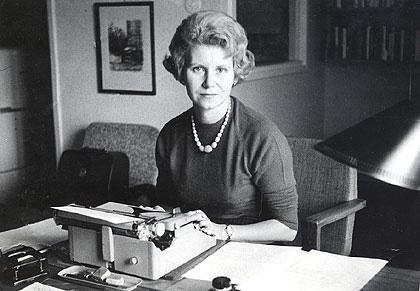
- Anu Kaipanen in 1963
- Born: Aune Helinä Mustonen; 14 March 1933; Muolaa, Finland
- Died: 29 September 2009 (aged 76); Helsinki, Finland
- Education: Master of Arts
- Alma mater: University of Helsinki
- Occupations: Writer, critic, teacher
- Spouse: Osmo Kaipainen (m. 1955, died)
- Children: 3, incl. Jouni Kaipainen
- Writing career
- Language: Finnish
- Notable works: Arkkienkeli Oulussa (1967); Granaattiomena (2002)
- Notable awards: Pro Finlandia (1983)

Anu Kaipainen (née Mustonen; 14 March 1933 — 29 September 2009) was a prolific Finnish writer and literary critic.

== Early life and education ==
Aune ("Anu") Helinä Mustonen was born in Muolaa, Karelia, to the school principal Johan Emil Mustonen and his second wife Signe Julia née Sjöblom.

She completed her secondary education in Helsinki in 1951, after which she studied at the University of Helsinki, graduating with a Master of Arts in 1955.

== Career ==
Before dedicating herself to writing, Kaipainen worked as a Finnish teacher for several years.

She had wide literary and cultural interests, contributing to literary criticism, as well as holding board and council roles at numerous literary and cultural organisations.

Throughout the 1960s and 70s, Kaipainen served as city councillor in her home town of Kauniainen.

=== Writing ===
Kaipainen's debut novel, Utuiset neulat, came out in 1960, followed by a poetry collection, Kädet helmassa, in 1961.

Afterwards she published a new novel every couple of years — over 20, in total — as well as several plays and TV scripts, short stories and a fairytale book.

Her 1967 novel Arkkienkeli Oulussa 1808-1809 ('Archangel in Oulu') is considered her breakthrough work, after which she became a full-time writer.

Her 2002 novel Granaattiomena ('Pomegranate') was shortlisted for the Finlandia Prize literary award.

Common themes in many of Kaipainen's works are on one hand myths and legends; on the other, contemporary realism and criticism of societal injustices and problems. She felt that a novel must be written openly and honestly, without trying to sugar-coat difficult issues.

== Awards and honours ==
Kaipainen won the Finnish State Prize for Literature twice, in 1966 and 1969.

In 1983, she received the Pro Finlandia medal of the Order of the Lion of Finland.

She was awarded the state pension for artists (Valtion taiteilijaeläke) in recognition of her life's work, from 1994.

In 2006, Kaipainen was recognised with the annual award (Suomen Kirjailijaliiton tunnustuspalkinto) of the Union of Finnish Writers.

== Personal life ==
In 1955, Anu Mustonen married the physician and later politician Osmo Kaipainen; the couple had three sons, the eldest of whom was the composer Jouni Kaipainen.
