= Dichotomie =

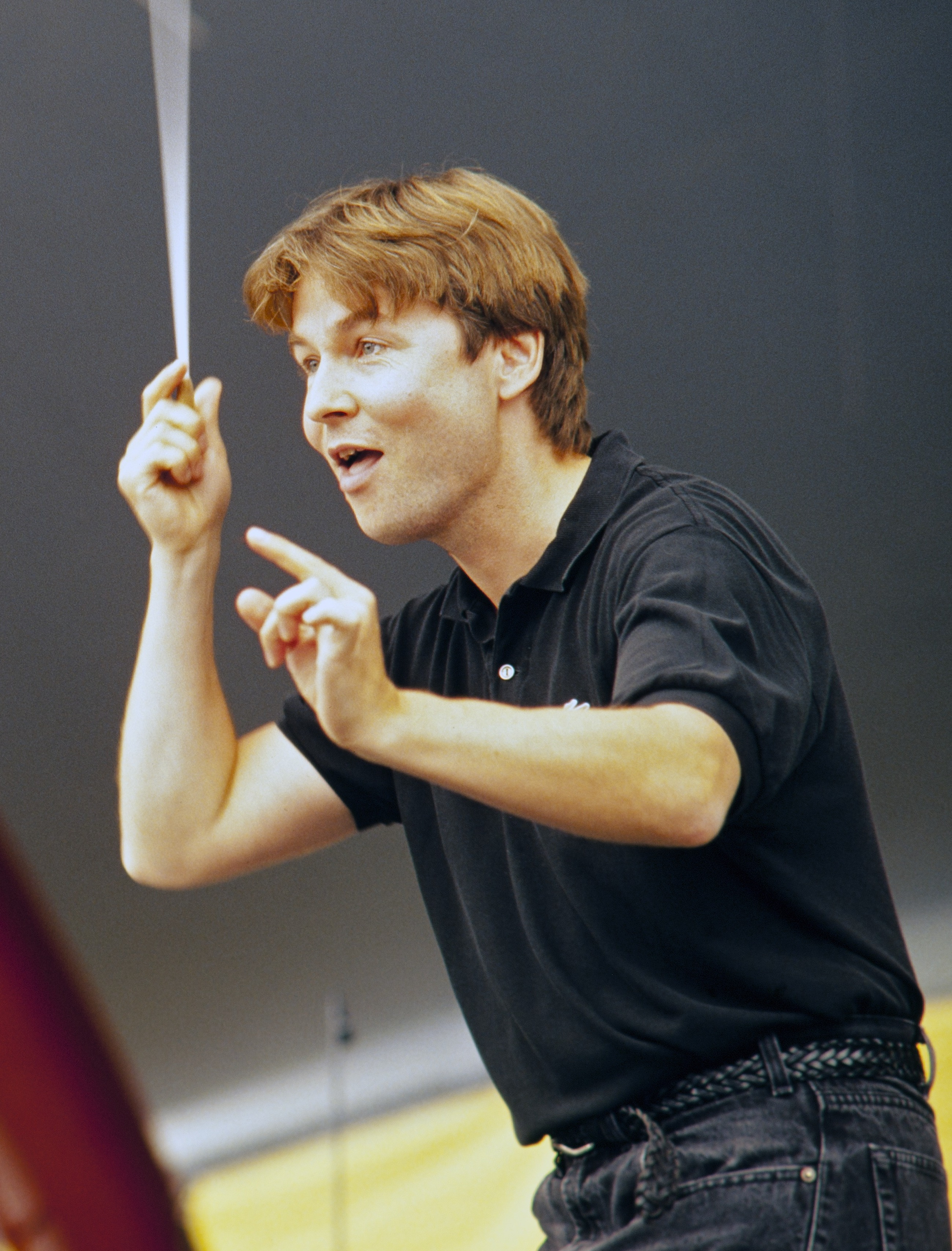
Esa-Pekka Salonen in 1997

Dichotomie is a two-movement composition for solo piano by the Finnish composer Esa-Pekka Salonen. The work was completed in October 2000 and was first performed by pianist Gloria Cheng on December 4, 2000 in Los Angeles.

== Composition ==
Salonen described the background and composition of Dichotomie in the score program notes, writing:

Dichotomie was originally intended to become a short encore-type of piece. I wanted to write a surprise new work for Gloria Cheng for a concert dedicated to my music in Los Angeles in January 2000. I soon realised, that the material I had invented had a tendency to grow into two very different kinds of music. It became obvious that this was going to be a longer piece in two movements as the material seemed to have that sort of genetic code. I missed my deadline for the January concert, and kept working during the early months of the year 2000. I put the piece aside for the summer, and finally completed it in October of the same year.

He continued:

The first movement, Mécanisme, is indeed like a machine, but not a perfect one: more like one of the Tinguely sculptures (or mobiles, they really defy all attempts to categorise them), which are very active, extroverted and expressive, but produce nothing concrete. I imagined a machine that could feel some sort of joie de vivre, and in that process, i.e. becoming human, would lose its cold precision. Organisme (originally a separate piece Spin I), the second movement, behaves very differently. Again, the music is busy on the surface, but breathes a lot slower and deeper. The music is completely continuous; all different sections grow into each other organically. A metaphor I had in mind was indeed a tree, not a huge one, more like a slender willow that moves gracefully in the wind but returns always to its original shape and position.

=== Structure ===
The work has a duration of roughly 18 minutes and is composed in two movements:

1. Mécanisme
2. Organisme

== Reception ==
Daniel Cariaga of the Los Angeles Times praised Dichotomie, remarking, "The first [movement] is wide-ranging but standoffish, the second many hued and emotionally resonant. Both parts are complex, dense with activity, thick with chordal movement yet unchaotic, very often Lisztian in textures." Reviewing a later recording of the piece, Anthony Tommasini of The New York Times similarly noted the "stupefying challenges" of the piano writing. Arnold Whittall of Gramophone wrote, "Dichotomie (2000) for solo piano provides a useful digest of Salonen’s current compositional preoccupations. Its first movement deploys aggressive but constantly shifting rhythmic mechanisms whose origins lie in Prokofiev, while its second seems closer to the flowing spontaneity of the Ligeti Etudes."
