= Orchestra (disambiguation) =

An orchestra is an instrumental ensemble usually composed of string, brass, and woodwind sections, sometimes with a percussion section.

Orchestra may also refer to:

- Theatre of ancient Greece: Orchestra, the circular area where actors and choruses performed in the theatre of ancient Greece
- Orchestra, the lower-level seating area for the audience in an auditorium (North America)
- MSC Orchestra, a cruise ship built for MSC Cruises
- "Orchestra", a song by the British band The Servant
- "Orchestra", the 79th episode of the television show The Suite Life of Zack & Cody
- Orchestra Control Engine, a suite of software components for the planning, development and deployment of real-time control applications for industrial machines and robots
- OW2 Orchestra, a WS-BPEL compliant web services orchestration solution
- Orchestra (album), a 1988 album by Eberhard Weber
- Orchestral Manoeuvres in the Dark, a British new wave music band, often abbreviated to Orchestral.
- Orchestral (horse)
- Orchestral (Visage album)

== See also ==
- The Orchestra (disambiguation)
