= Kraft (Lindberg) =

Kraft is a composition for solo ensemble, electronics, and orchestra by the Finnish composer Magnus Lindberg. The work was commissioned by the Helsinki Festival and was first performed on 4 September 1985 by the Toimii ensemble and the Finnish Radio Symphony Orchestra under the direction of Esa-Pekka Salonen. The piece was awarded the International Rostrum of Composers in 1986 and won the Nordic Council Music Prize in 1988.

== Composition ==
Kraft has a duration of approximately 25 minutes and is composed in two numbered movements. It was composed between 1983 and 1985. Lindberg described the electronic elements of the piece in the score program notes, writing:

All the musical material of the piece has been prepared with a micro-computer, with programmes written in FORTH allowing a very flexible control of rhythm and chord processes. The programme is based on a formalization of rules for creation of rhythmic events, gestures and temporal processes, and an environment allowing a graphical output for metric notation. Similar rule-based programmes control the creation of harmonic material by a comparison to previously defined and accepted chordal successions given by the composer.

He added, "The control of amplification and spatialization of the soloists during the performance is done with an application written in PreFORM and running on a Macintosh computer allowing a precise control of movement in the hall in real time."

=== Instrumentation ===
The work is scored for an ensemble of soloists and a large orchestra consisting of four flutes (4th doubling piccolo), alto flute, three oboes, cor anglais, three clarinets (doubling E♭ clarinet), bass clarinet, alto saxophone, three bassoons, contrabassoon, four horns, four trumpets, four trombones, tuba, four percussionists, two harps, piano (doubling celesta), and strings. The soloists comprise a clarinet (doubling E♭ clarinet, bass clarinet, and contrabass clarinet), two percussionists, piano, cello, a sound controller, and the conductor; these soloists must from time to time leave the stage to play an assortment of junkyard percussion instruments or perform various other extended techniques.

== Reception ==
Kraft has been highly praised by music critics. Reviewing the New York City premiere, Anthony Tommasini of The New York Times called it "a sound barrage for large orchestra" and wrote, "Though Kraft bustles with heady, impish music, it is a brilliant, serious-minded contemporary work." Tommasini continued, "Kraft begins with spasms of thick chords that slowly disintegrate, until only scraggly lines for cello and clarinet are audible. The piece evolves in blocks of sound and constantly changing episodes. At one point there is a kind of fractured chorale, full of brassy slides and swelling strings. At another, the music erupts in slashing bursts that dissolve into gentle gong tones coming from all around the hall, almost like pagoda music." He added, "Though Mr. Lindberg devised the rhythmic relationships in Kraft through mathematical formulas, I could believe that he had written the piece intuitively, since it comes across as spontaneous and keeps you wondering what will happen next."

Nick Kimberley of The Observer also praised the work, observing, "Its circus aspects at all times served the musical logic. The initial sonic cataclysm splinters into tiny, often barely audible fragments that Lindberg then reassembles. A bridging episode for flutes and percussion radiates stillness before Lindberg fashions a final cathartic explosion." Ivan Hewett of BBC Music Magazine similarly opined, "Magnus Lindberg is a composer who likes extremes. Whenever his music visits the middle range of gesture and dynamic, you can be pretty sure that it’s only a stage on some compelling journey to the outer regions, either of high, whispering delicacy, or of growling, brass- and gong-coloured tumult. His idiom is revealed at its most persuasive in his orchestral piece Kraft." The music critic Andrew Clements remarked, "With explosive gestures, vivid sonorities and a huge battery of percussion arrayed around the auditorium, Kraft still packs a powerful punch, though now it appears more generalised and less discriminating in its harmonic organisation than later Lindberg."

However, Arnold Whittall of Gramophone gave the work only lukewarm marks, saying, "...despite the bravura of the confrontations it contrives between the orchestra (with electronics in attendance) and a team of clarinet, cello, piano and percussion soloists, the effect remains unashamedly earth-bound: sometimes dense to the point of congestion, other times highly fragmented, but not quite coming into focus in the way the more regular rhythmic patterns and rooted harmonic processes of the later works make possible."
