= The Orchestra (app) =

- Developer(s): Touch Press
- Initial release: December 6, 2012
- Platform: iOS (iPad) iOS (iPhone)
- Website: orchestra.touchpress.com

The Orchestra is an iPad and iPhone app developed and published by Touch Press in partnership with the Music Sales Group, Esa-Pekka Salonen and the Philharmonia Orchestra. The app features performances of eight works representing three centuries of symphonic music. It allows real-time selection of multiple video and audio tracks, along with an automatically synchronized score and graphical note-by-note visualization of each piece as it is played. The result is an immersive environment for exploring the music and every instrument in the orchestra. The app was chosen as Editors’ Choice in the App Store (iOS), and critics praised its scope and design. It was recently included in Apple’s “Your Verse” campaign, a global promotional campaign for the iPad featuring Esa-Pekka Salonen.

== Features ==
The Orchestra introduced a number of innovative features that have since become trademarks of Touch Press apps. The multi-camera video allows users to switch between different angles and sections of the orchestra. The BeatMap is an innovative visualization of the performances that shows different sections of the orchestra pulse in time with the music. The app also uses 3D rotational photography of the different instruments, a technique that Touch Press first brought to the iPad in 2010 with "The Elements." Music critic Mark Swed wrote substantial commentary for each of the pieces.

== Music ==
- Joseph Haydn: Symphony No. 6 (first movement)
- Ludwig van Beethoven: Symphony No. 5 (fourth movement recapitulation area)
- Hector Berlioz: Symphonie fantastique (fourth movement)
- Claude Debussy: Prélude à l'après-midi d'un faune
- Gustav Mahler: Symphony No. 6 (first movement, exposition)
- Igor Stravinsky: The Firebird (order XVII-XIX)
- Witold Lutosławski: Concerto for Orchestra (second movement)
- Esa-Pekka Salonen: Violin Concerto (second and third movements)

== Reception ==
The Orchestra received very positive reviews upon release, with Shane Richmond describing the app in a 5 star review for The Daily Telegraph as, “informative and also hypnotic,” and later stating, “With "The Orchestra," Touch Press has made what might be its first app that could not exist in any other form.” Slate called "The Orchestra," “a flat-out astounding new app,” and The Guardian described it as, “a fantastically immersive experience that creates…something new in the field of classical music interactivity.”
