= Helix (composition) =

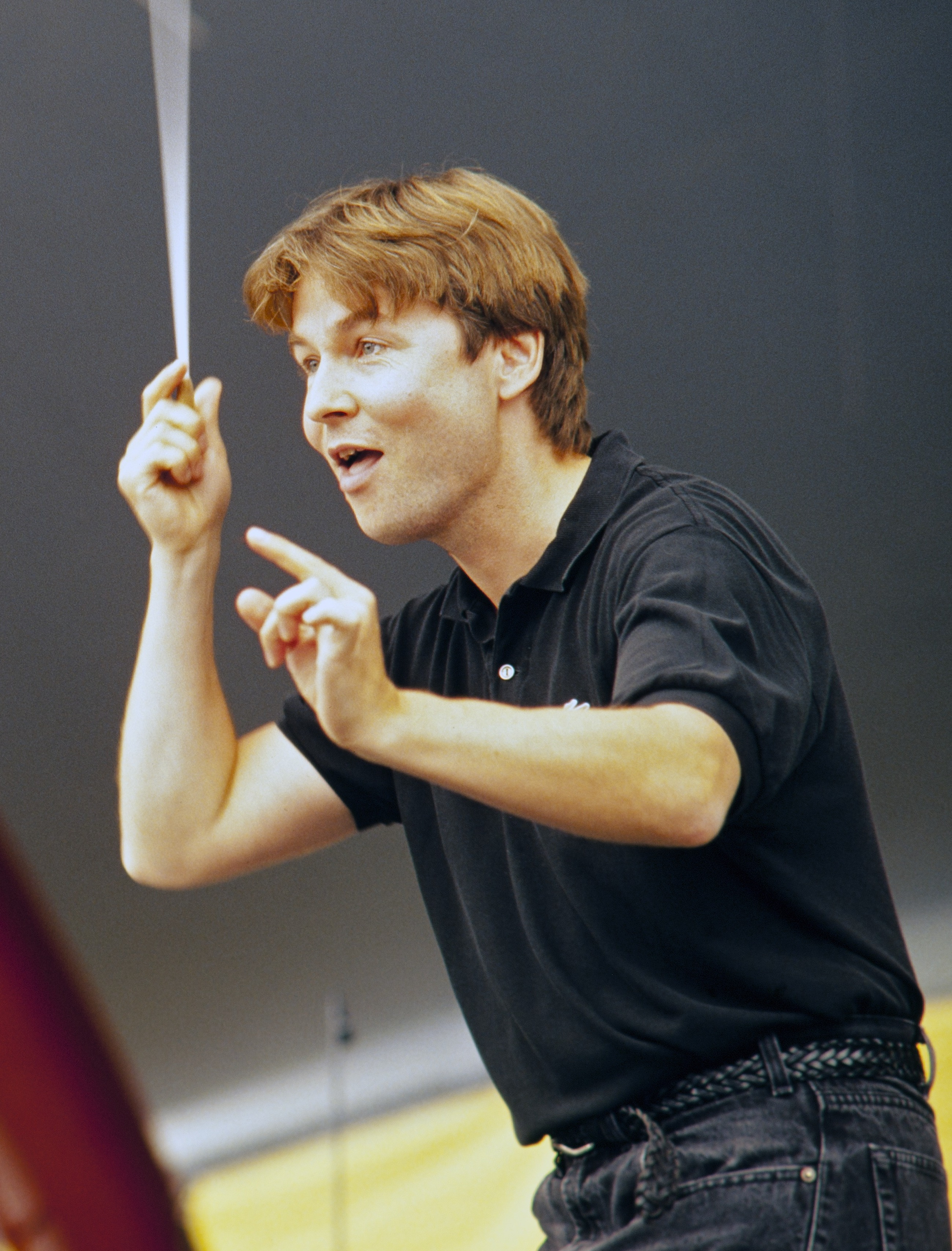
Esa-Pekka Salonen in 1997

Helix for orchestra is a single-movement orchestral composition by the Finnish composer Esa-Pekka Salonen. The work was commissioned by the BBC and was first performed August 27, 2005 at The Proms by the World Orchestra for Peace under conductor Valery Gergiev, to whom the piece is dedicated.

== Composition ==
Helix has a duration of roughly nine minutes and is composed in one continuous movement. Salonen compared the form of the work to a spiral or coil, writing in the score program notes:

The process of Helix is basically that of a nine-minute accelerando. The tempo gets faster, but the note values of the phrases become correspondingly longer. Therefore only the material's relation to the pulse changes, not necessarily the impression of speed itself. Hence the spiral metaphor: the material (which consists essentially of two different phrases) is being pushed through constantly narrowing concentric circles until the music reaches a point where it has to stop as it has nowhere to go.

=== Instrumentation ===
The work is scored for three flutes (doubling piccolo), three oboes (doubling cor anglais), two clarinets, two bassoons, contrabassoon, four French horns, three trumpets, three trombones, tuba, timpani, five percussionists, harp, and strings.

== Reception ==
Anne Midgette of The New York Times called Helix "an exuberant showpiece" and wrote, "Its gimmick is that the tempo markings steadily increase throughout, adding propulsive force to a work that, thick with detail, throws out sounds and ideas as it builds steam." Stephen Johnson of BBC Music Magazine compared the work favorably to Salonen's Piano Concerto, writing, "The driven and dazzlingly colourful Helix matches all the Concerto can offer in less than a third of its length." Richard S. Ginell of the Los Angeles Times described it as "basically a musical coil that begins almost in a dream-like haze and accelerates and thickens and tightens until the overloaded structure comes to a screaming halt just short of the nine-minute mark." Richard Scheinin of the San Jose Mercury News also praised the composition and said, "Teeming with detail, the piece is a steady funneling of energy and suspense, self-multiplying. Through the strings, it also grew long-lined, romantic — but with a shocking hatchet finish. Only nine minutes long, it was impressive; Salonen seemed to be saying, 'This is who I am.'"
