= Nemmers Prize in Music Composition =

American music award

The Michael Ludwig Nemmers Prize in Music Composition is awarded biennially from the Bienen School of Music at Northwestern University. The prize money is US$100,000 and the prize includes a performance by the Chicago Symphony Orchestra. The prize is awarded to contemporary classical composers, "who have significantly influenced the field of composition." The award was established in 2003.

== Recipients ==
- 2004 John Adams
- 2006 Oliver Knussen
- 2008 Kaija Saariaho
- 2010 John Luther Adams
- 2012 Aaron Jay Kernis
- 2014 Esa-Pekka Salonen
- 2016 Steve Reich
- 2018 Jennifer Higdon
- 2021 William Bolcom
- 2023 Tania León
