= Paul Crossley (pianist) =

British pianist

Paul Christopher Richard Crossley CBE (born 17 May 1944) is a British pianist.

Born in Dewsbury, Yorkshire, his piano teacher was Fanny Waterman in Leeds. While a student at Mansfield College, Oxford, he was discovered by Olivier Messiaen and his wife Yvonne Loriod, who heard him play and immediately invited him to come to Paris to study with them. In 1968 he was second prize winner (joint prize winner with Japanese pianist Izumi Tateno) at the Messiaen Competition in Royan, France. Crossley is particularly associated with the music of Messiaen and British composers such as Michael Tippett, Nicholas Maw and George Benjamin. Tippett wrote his third and fourth piano sonatas specifically with Crossley in mind. His extensive discography includes the piano works of Tippett, Fauré, Debussy and Ravel and the Fauré violin sonatas with Arthur Grumiaux.

Crossley was artistic director of the London Sinfonietta from 1988 to 1994.

He presented a landmark television series on avant garde classical music entitled Sinfonietta for Channel 4.
