= Leila Josefowicz =

- Born: October 20, 1977 (age 48); Mississauga, Ontario, Canada
- Genres: Classical
- Occupations: Musician
- Instruments: Violin
- Labels: Philips; Warner Classics; Deutsche Grammophon; Nonesuch
- Website: www.leilajosefowicz.com

Leila Bronia Josefowicz (/ˈliːlə dʒoʊˈsɛfəwɪts/ LEE-lə joh-SEF-ə-witz; born October 20, 1977) is an American-Canadian classical violinist.

== Biography ==
Josefowicz was born in Mississauga, Ontario, Canada. When she was a young child her family moved to Los Angeles, California, where she started studying violin at the age of three and a half using the Suzuki method. Her father, physicist Jack Josefowicz, and mother, biologist Wendy Josefowicz, learned with her. At age five she started formal lessons with Idel Low. At seven she began studies with the distinguished violin teacher Robert Lipsett at The Colburn School. Leila's parents, valuing a well-rounded education, believed that both she and her brother Steven should stay in the public school system, and Leila attended public middle and high school despite a very full schedule of music activities.

When Leila was 13 the Josefowiczes moved to Philadelphia so she could attend the prestigious Curtis Institute of Music, where she studied with Jaime Laredo, Jascha Brodsky, Felix Galimir and Joseph Gingold. Leila also attended the Julia R. Masterman School in Philadelphia while at Curtis, completing a bachelor of music degree and her high school diploma in the same year.

== Career ==
While still in her teens, Josefowicz played with symphony orchestras in Europe, Asia and North America, including the major orchestras of Philadelphia, Cleveland, Los Angeles, Houston, Chicago, Boston, Montreal, and Toronto.

Josefowicz made her Carnegie Hall debut in 1994 performing the Tchaikovsky Concerto with Sir Neville Marriner and the Academy of St. Martin in the Fields. The same year, she signed an exclusive recording contract with Philips Classics, recording the Tchaikovsky and Sibelius concertos. Other recordings followed on Warner Classics, Nonesuch Records, and Deutsche Grammophon that include masterworks for solo violin, recital repertoire and the concertos of Romantic and modern composers.

Josefowicz has kept a busy international schedule as a soloist, performing regularly around the world, including North and South America, Europe, Asia, Australia and New Zealand. In addition to traditional masterworks, she has performed contemporary compositions with orchestras including the Berlin Philharmonic, Royal Concertgebouw Orchestra, Boston Symphony Orchestra, Chicago Symphony Orchestra, New York Philharmonic, Cleveland Orchestra, Los Angeles Philharmonic Orchestra, San Francisco Symphony, Tonhalle-Orchester Zürich, Finnish Radio Symphony Orchestra, Royal Scottish National Orchestra, St. Louis Symphony Orchestra, and the Atlanta Symphony Orchestra. She has also made recent appearances with the London Symphony Orchestra, Gewandhausorchester Leipzig, London Philharmonic Orchestra, Munich Philharmonic, and the Czech Philharmonic.

Josefowicz is acclaimed for championing new compositions, including works by John Adams, Oliver Knussen, Thomas Adès, and Luca Francesconi. In 2008–09 she performed the world premiere of the violin concerto written for her by Esa-Pekka Salonen, for which he won the Grawemeyer Prize, with the Los Angeles Philharmonic; Steven Mackey wrote a violin concerto for her that had its world premiere with the St. Louis Symphony; and Colin Matthews wrote a concerto for her that had its world premiere with the City of Birmingham Symphony Orchestra. In 2014 she gave the world premiere of the concerto Duende written for her by Francesconi, for which he won the Royal Philharmonic Society Music Award. In 2015 she gave the world premiere of the concerto Scheherazade.2, written for her by John Adams, with the New York Philharmonic.

Josefowicz received an Avery Fisher Career Grant in 1994. In 2007 she was named a USA Cummings Fellow, United States Artists. For her advocacy of new contemporary works for the violin, Josefowicz was named a 2008 MacArthur Fellow. In 2018 she was awarded the Avery Fisher Prize.

Josefowicz was married to the conductor Kristjan Järvi, and they have a son.
