= Toimii =

Toimii (Finnish "It works") is an ensemble for new music founded in 1982 by Finnish composer Magnus Lindberg, along with several other young composers and instrumentalists connected with the Sibelius Academy. Along with the new-music appreciation group Korvat auki (Finnish "Ears open"), it did much to bring new music to listeners in Finland in the 1980s and 1990s.

Toimii was formed to be a laboratory where composers, instrumentalists, and other artists could work on new ways of creating music and improvising. Toimii was born when Magnus Lindberg, Otto Romanowski, and Esa-Pekka Salonen were preparing a concert performance of Karlheinz Stockhausen's Plus-Minus. Vinko Globokar and his improvisation group New Phonic Art had a significant influence on the burgeoning ensemble after Lindberg began studies with him in Paris in the autumn of 1981, and it was at the Jyväskylä Summer Festival in 1982 where Lindberg's Action-Situation-Signification and a Globokar work were paired that the ensemble first appeared under the name Toimii.

Apart from performing existing pieces and writing collective pieces Toimii encouraged poets, painters, dramaturgists, and actors to write pieces for its concerts. Each rehearsal period started without a determined program and the rehearsals consisted of combining existing pieces with improvising and last-minute composing and arranging. All of the members had an equal input into every detail of each concert.

Magnus Lindberg's 1985 work Kraft was written as a concerto for Toimii and a Symphony Orchestra, the ensemble has toured around the world performing the piece so far 14 times and has recorded it twice. Toimii visited many festivals in locations as far apart as Uusikaupunki, Tromsø, and Ojai.

Toimii has performed widely in Europe and the US. While its members entered upon their busy careers, they met once or twice each year during the 1980s and 1990s for a period of intensive work. Toimii also performed several very successful children's concerts at the Suvisoitto-festival in Finland, at the Ojai Music Festival, and at the Queen Elizabeth Hall in London, The last performances of the ensemble to date were in December 2001 at the Related Rocks Festival in London and in 2003 in Helsinki where they also made their second recording of Lindberg's Kraft.

== Members ==
- Lassi Erkkilä, percussion
- Kari Kriikku, clarinet
- Anssi Karttunen, cello
- Timo Korhonen, guitar (joined 1989)
- Juhani Liimatainen, sound designer
- Magnus Lindberg, piano
- Riku Niemi, percussion (joined 1989)
- Otto Romanowski, electronics
- Esa-Pekka Salonen, conductor

== Works Written for Toimii ==
- Juhana Blomstedt: Speleologia
- Oliver Knussen: Rough Cut
- Magnus Lindberg: Decorrente
- Magnus Lindberg: Action-Situation-Signification for bass clarinet (doubling double bass clarinet), piano, percussion, cello, and live electronics (1982)
- Magnus Lindberg: Kiri for clarinet, guitar, cello, percussion, and electronics (1993)
- Magnus Lindberg: Kraft (1985)
- Riku Niemi: Magnus meets Monk
- Pentti Saaritsa: Ascensus
- Esa-Pekka Salonen: Floof (1988)
- Esa-Pekka Salonen: Nur-text
- Juha Siltanen: Doppler Variation
- Toimii-ensemble: Related Stones – A Rock OperaVIAF
