= Osmo Kaipainen =

Finnish physician and politician

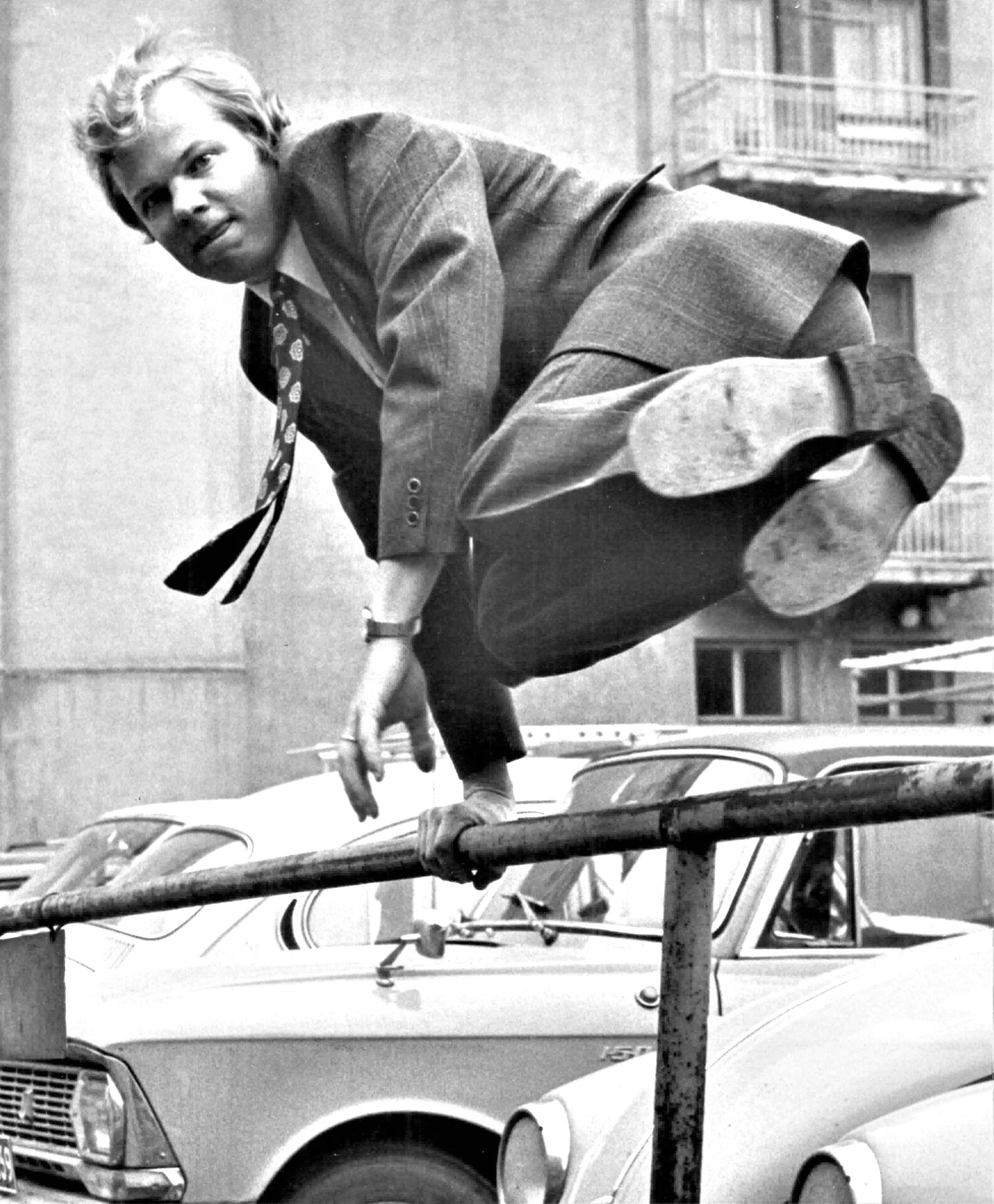
Kaipainen in 1972

Osmo Ensio Kaipainen (12 August 1933, Pieksämäki – 15 May 1985) was a Finnish physician and politician. He was Minister of Social Affairs and Heath from 23 February to 3 September 1972. He served as a Member of the Parliament of Finland from 1970 to 1975, representing the Social Democratic Party of Finland (SDP). Kaipainen belonged to the left wing of the party. His wife was the author Anu Kaipainen.
