= Piano Concerto (Salonen) =

2007 concerto by Esa-Pekka Salonen

The Piano Concerto is a concerto for solo piano and orchestra in three movements by the Finnish composer Esa-Pekka Salonen. The work was jointly commissioned by the New York Philharmonic, the BBC, the NDR Symphony Orchestra, and Radio France. It was premiered February 1, 2007, in Avery Fisher Hall, New York City, with Salonen conducting the pianist Yefim Bronfman and the New York Philharmonic. Salonen dedicated the piece to Yefim Bronfman.

== Composition ==
The Piano Concerto has duration of roughly 33 minutes and is composed in three numbered movements. The second movement features a musical "sci-fi nightmare" titled "Synthetic Folk Music with Artificial Birds," about which Salonen wrote in the score program notes:

I imagined a post-biological culture, where the cybernetic systems suddenly develop an existential need of folklore. Composing intelligence creates music that somehow relates to an area that long time ago was called the Balkans. All this is accompanied by bird-robots. A Homage to Stanisław Lem.

=== Instrumentation ===
The work is scored for solo piano and an orchestra comprising three flutes (1st doubling on 2nd piccolo; 2nd doubling alto flute & 3rd piccolo; 3rd doubling 1st piccolo), three oboes (3rd doubling cor anglais), three clarinets (3rd doubling alto saxophone), bass clarinet, contrabass clarinet, two bassoons, contrabassoon, three French horns, two trumpets, two trombones, timpani, four percussionists, harp, celesta, and strings.

== Reception ==
Reviewing the world premiere, Anthony Tommasini of The New York Times highly praised the concerto, writing, "From its orchestral introduction (a halting yet urgent march with fidgety dotted-rhythm string figurations and lumbering syncopated riffs in the timpani and drums) to its incandescent conclusion (with the tentative introductory music turned into a din of pungently harmonic triumph), this 30-minute concerto in three movements pulls you along its inexorable path." Tommasini added, "I cannot remember the last time a premiere at the New York Philharmonic won such an enthusiastic ovation." Fiona Maddocks of the London Evening Standard similarly opined, "Gleefully motoric outer movements contrasted with a lyrical and nostalgic central section, which sang out in homage to Rachmaninov".

Conversely, Ivan Hewett of The Daily Telegraph criticized Salonen's use of "European modernism" and called the work a "sprawling, ill-focused, windily rhetorical piece." Hewett added, "The sense of vacillation was painful."

Mark Swed of the Los Angeles Times later admonished criticisms of the concerto, writing, "Open-minded Americans (...) have enjoyed all that, finding not imitation but admirable absorption" and added, "Perhaps on encountering a new work, listeners latched on to what they already know."
