= Jouni Kaipainen =

Finnish composer

- Born: Jouni Ilari Kaipainen; 24 November 1956; Helsinki, Finland
- Died: 23 November 2015 (aged 58); Tampere, Finland

Jouni Ilari Kaipainen (24 November 1956 – 23 November 2015) was a Finnish composer.

Kaipainen was born in Helsinki to the physician and politician Osmo Kaipainen, and his wife, the author Anu Kaipainen. He studied at the Sibelius Academy in Helsinki under Aulis Sallinen and Paavo Heininen. He died on 23 November 2015, the eve of his 59th birthday.

== Compositions ==
=== Stage ===
- Konstanzin ihme (The Miracle at Constance), opera in two acts, Op. 30
- Hämäränmaassa, music play for children, Op. 69 (2004)
- Taikakivet, musical fantasy for actors, dancers and orchestra (2013)

=== Orchestral ===
- Symphonies
  - Symphony No. 1 Op. 20 (1985)
  - Symphony No. 2 Op. 44 (1994)
  - Symphony No. 3 Op. 72 (2004)
  - Symphony No. 4 Commedia, Op. 93 (2012), with TTBB choir, baritone and soprano soloists
- Apotheosis Op. 7 (1975), for chamber orchestra
- Sisyphus Dreams Op. 47 (1994)
- Accende lumen sensibus, concerto for small orchestra, Op. 52 (1996)
- Millennium Fanfare, Op. 60 (1999)
- North by North-East, Op. 63 (2001)
- Erik (...jag hör det ständigt...) Op. 78 (2006)
- Notkea Keaton - The Ghost of Buster Op. 86 (2008–09)
- Aubade beninoise (2009)

=== Concertante ===
- Concerto for two pianos Ladders to Fire, Op. 14 (1979)
- Clarinet Concerto Carpe diem!, Op. 38 (1990)
- Oboe Concerto, Op. 46 (1994)
- Concerto for Saxophone Quartet and Orchestra Vernal Concerto, Op. 53 (1996)
- Piano Concerto, Op. 55 (1997)
- Viola Concerto, Op. 56 (1997)
- Horn Concerto, Op. 61 (2001)
- Cello Concerto No. 1, Op. 65 (2003)
- Cello Concerto No. 2 (work in progress)
- Trumpet Concerto, Op. 66 (2003)
- Bassoon Concerto, Op. 74 (2005)
- Violin Concerto, Op. 76 (2006)
- Trombone Concerto Life is..., Op. 100 (2015)

=== Chamber ===
- String Quartets
  - String Quartet No. 1, Op. 2 (1973)
  - String Quartet No. 2, Op. 5 (1974)
  - String Quartet No. 3, Op. 25 (1984)
  - String Quartet No. 4, Op. 45 (1994)
  - String Quartet No. 5, Op. 70 (2004)
  - String Quartet No. 6 The Terror Run, Op. 92 (2010)
  - String Quartet No. 7 Batsheba, Op. 98 (2013)
  - String Quartet No. 8 The Triumph, Op. 101 (2013)
- Trios
  - Trio No. 1, for clarinet, cello and piano, Op. 21 (1983)
  - Trio No. 2 Andamento, for flute, bassoon and piano, Op. 28 (1986)
  - Trio No. 3, for violin, cello and piano, Op. 29 (1987)
  - Trio No. 4, for violin, cello and piano, Op. 102 (2014)
- Aspetti Op. 6 (1974)
- Trois morceaux de l'aube Op. 15 (1980–81)
- Far from Home, for flute, saxophone, guitar and percussion, Op. 17 (1981)
- Elegia Op. 22 (1983)
- Parcours, for flute and harpsichord, Op. 23 (1983)
- Titus’ Elegy Op. 24b (1983)
- Piping Down the Valleys Wild, for bass clarinet and piano, Op. 26 (1984)
- Tombeau de Rabelais, for violin, viola, bass and bassoon, Op. 32 (1987/2001)
- Remous, for four flutes, Op. 37 (1990)
- Time flies, for flute, violin, cello and piano, Op. 48 (1995)
- Sextet, for flute, saxophone/clarinet, horn, violin, cello and piano, Op. 57 (1996)
- Weigold-Walzer, for flute, violin, viola and piano, (1999)
- Clarinet Quintet, Op. 59a (2000)
- Elemental Chanting, for cello and accordion, Op. 87 (2009)
- Inno, for viola and piano (2010)
- Sonata Concertante for flute, violin, viola, cello, double bass and harp, Op. 90 (2010)
- Violin Sonata, Op. 91 (2014)
- Sonata for Two Violins, Op. 94 (2011)

=== Instrumental ===
- Piano Sonatina, Op. 9 (1976)
- ...la chimère de l'humidité de la nuit?, for alto saxophone, Op. 12b (1978)
- Ladders to Fire, for two pianos, Op. 14 (1979)
- Je chante la chaleur désespérée, for piano, Op. 16 (1981)
- Altaforte, for trumpet and electronic tape, Op. 18 (1982)
- Conte, for piano, Op. 27 (1985)
- Gena, for accordion, Op. 31 (1987)
- L’anello di Aurora, for violin, Op. 34 (1988)
- Tenebrae, for guitar, Op. 39 (1991)
- Serenade: Full Moon, Lunatic Bassoon, for bassoon, Op. 42 (1993)
- Vento, for accordion, Op. 58 (1998)
- Placido, Op. 68 (2003–05)
- Reunion Confirmed, passacaglia for organ, Op. 71 (2004)
- Three Preludes, for piano (2006)
- Anything Goes!, for cello (2010)

=== Vocal/Choral ===
- Quatro Canciones de García Lorca, for baritone and piano, Op. 8 (1975)
- Yölauluja (Nocturnal Songs), Op. 11 (1978)
- Cinq poèmes de René Char, for soprano and small orchestra, Op. 12a (1980)
- Pitkän kesän poikki iltaan (The Long Summer's Journey into Evening), for soprano and ensemble, Op. 13 (1979)
- Muunlaisten musiikkia (Music of Persons of Another Kind), for mezzo-soprano and piano, Op. 19 (1984)
- Stjärnenatten (Starry Night), for soprano and 14 players, Op. 35 (1989)
- Lacrimosa, for two choirs, Op. 36 (1989)
- Antiphona SATB, for children's choir and male choir a cappella, Op. 40 (1992)
- Sonnet 43, for soprano and piano, Op. 43 (1994)
- Matkalla (On the Road), for mixed choir, percussion and strings, Op. 49 (1995)
- Runopolku (Rune Walk), for soprano and piano, Op. 50 (1995)
- Glühende Blumen des Leichtsinns, for soprano and string quartet, Op. 51 (1995)
- Des Flußes Stimme (Requiem in memoriam Jeremy Parsons), for mixed choir a cappella, Op. 54 (1996)
- Rauha ja Onni (Peace and Happiness), for soprano and piano, Op. 64 (2001)
- En skål för alla kvinnors ära, for soprano, horn and piano, Op. 67 (2003–05)
- Felicity & Fullnesse, monodrama for baritone and orchestra, Op. 75 (2006)
- ...ohikulkua ja epäilystä... (...bypassing and doubts...), monodrama for mezzo-soprano and string quartet
- The Canticle of Brother Sun, for soprano, baritone and orchestra, Op. 88 (2009)
- Var det Edith?, for soprano, string quintet and piano, Op. 95 (2011)
- Tyttöjä ja kuolemaa (Deaths and Maidens), for male choir, Op. 101 (2014)
