= Concerto No. 2 =

Concerto No. 2 may refer to:

- Cello Concerto No. 2 (disambiguation), several concertos
- Clarinet Concerto No. 2 (disambiguation), two concertos
- Horn Concerto No. 2 (disambiguation), two concertos
- Piano Concerto No. 2 (disambiguation), several concertos
- Violin Concerto No. 2 (disambiguation), several concertos
- Flute Concerto No. 2 (Mozart), an adaptation of the 1777 oboe concerto by Wolfgang Amadeus Mozart
- Concerto for Orchestra No. 2 (Stucky), a 2003 concerto by Steven Stucky
- Tschaikovsky Piano Concerto No. 2 (ballet), a 1941 ballet by George Balanchine
