= Lisa Batiashvili =

Georgian violinist (born 1979)

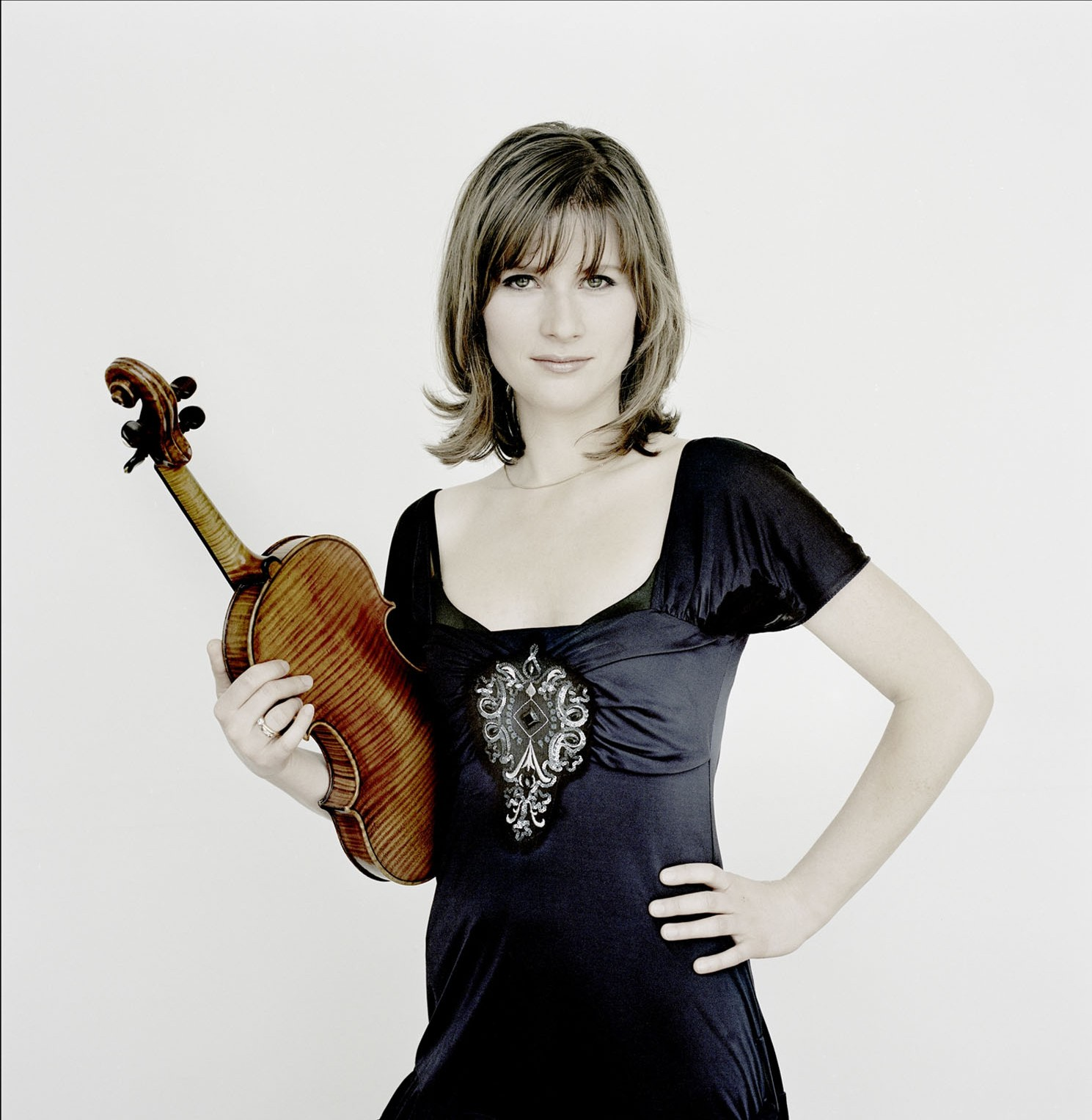

Background information
- Born: 7 March 1979 (age 47); Tbilisi, Georgian SSR, Soviet Union
- Genres: Chamber music, classical music
- Occupation: Violinist
- Instrument: 1739 Guarneri del Gesu violin (Cozio 61377)
- Labels: Sony Classical/SME, Deutsche Grammophon/Universal Classics
- Website: lisabatiashvili.com

Elisabeth Batiashvili (Georgian: ელისაბედ ბათიაშვილი; born 7 March 1979), professionally known as Lisa Batiashvili, is a prominent Georgian violinist active across Europe and the United States. A former New York Philharmonic artist-in-residence, she is acclaimed for her "natural elegance, silky sound and the meticulous grace of her articulation". Batiashvili makes frequent appearances at high-profile international events; she was the violin soloist at the 2018 Nobel Prize concert.

== Early life and education ==
Batiashvili was born in Tbilisi, the capital of Georgia, to a violinist father and a pianist mother. She began learning violin with her father from age four. The family left Georgia in 1991 when she was 12 years old, and settled in Germany. She later studied at the Hochschule für Musik und Theater Hamburg. Mark Lubotsky, her teacher in Hamburg, had been a student of David Oistrakh, for whom Shostakovich wrote his violin concertos. Later, Lisa Batiashvili also studied with Ana Chumachenco.

In 1995, aged 16, she placed second at the International Jean Sibelius Violin Competition in Helsinki.

== Career ==
=== Performances ===
Batiashvili was one of the first of the BBC Radio 3 New Generation Artists, from 1999 to 2001. She has collaborated in chamber music and concerto performances with cellist Alban Gerhardt and pianist Steven Osborne, both BBC New Generation Artists exactly contemporary with Batiashvili. She has also worked with a later BBC New Generation Artist, Ashley Wass, in recital. She made her BBC Proms debut in 2000.

Batiashvili has worked with conductors including Daniel Barenboim, Semyon Bychkov, Alan Gilbert, Mariss Jansons, Vladimir Jurowski, Klaus Mäkelä, Yannick Nézet-Séguin, Sakari Oramo, Antonio Pappano, Kirill Petrenko, Simon Rattle, Esa-Pekka Salonen, Christian Thielemann, Tugan Sokhiev and David Zinman. Her chamber-music partners have included Alban Gerhardt, Steven Osborne, Ashley Wass, François Leleux, Paul Lewis, Lawrence Power, Sebastian Klinger, Jean-Yves Thibaudet, Gautier Capuçon, Jörg Widmann, Denis Kozhukhin, Tsotne Zedginidze and Giorgi Gigashvili.

=== Dedications and commissions ===
Magnus Lindberg dedicated a violin concerto to her, the world premiere of which she gave at Avery Fisher Hall, New York, on 22 August 2006 and European premiere in Sweden in October. Batiashvili and her husband, oboist François Leleux, commissioned from the Georgian composer Giya Kancheli the double concerto Broken Chant, which they premiered in February 2008 with the BBC Symphony Orchestra in London. She also commissioned a solo violin encore from her compatriot Igor Loboda for solo violin, "Requiem for Ukraine", which was meant to be a statement against conductor Valery Gergiev's cozy relationship with the regime of Vladimir Putin.

=== Artist in residence ===
Batiashavili was artist-in-residence with the New York Philharmonic for the 2014/15 season, and with the Accademia Nazionale di Santa Cecilia for the 2017/18 season. In parallel, she has an artist residency with the NDR Symphony Orchestra. She has been the artist in Residence with the Berlin Philharmonic for the 2023–24 season.

=== Commercial recordings ===
Her commercial recordings include Magnus Lindberg's Violin Concerto No. 1 as part of her recording contract with Sony Classical, which she signed in 2007. And more recently, she has recorded several albums with Deutsche Grammophon, including in 2016, an album of the Tchaikovsky and Sibelius Violin Concertos and in 2017, an album of Prokofiev's works including his Violin Concertos 1 and 2.

=== Instrument ===
She plays a 1739 Guarneri del Gesu violin (Cozio 61377) lent to her from the private collection of an anonymous German collector.

== Awards ==
- 2003 Leonard Bernstein Award
- 2006 Beethoven Ring
- 2025 Kaiser Otto Prize

=== Memberships ===
She is foreign member of the Royal Swedish Academy of Music.

== Private life ==
Batiashvili is married to French oboist François Leleux. They have resided in both Munich and France with their two children.

== Discography ==
- 2001: Works For Violin & Piano – Elizabeth Batiashvili performs works by Brahms, Bach, Schubert. Published by EMI Classics 2001.
- 2007: European Concert from Berlin – Berlin Philharmonic conducted by Sir Simon Rattle. Including Brahms: Symphony No. 4; & Double Concerto op. 102 performed by Batiashvili (violin) and Truls Mørk (cello). Published by EuroArt, 1 May 2007.
- 2007: Sibelius / Lindberg – Lisa Batiashvili and the Finnish Radio Symphony Orchestra conducted by Sakari Oramo: Jean Sibelius Violin Concerto & Magnus Lindberg Violin Concerto No. 1. Published by Sony Classical, 10 September 2007.
- 2008: Mozart – Mozart's Oboe Quartet in F, K370, and 3 Arias from The Magic Flute. Performed by Francois Leleux, Lisa Batiashvili, Laurence Power and Sebastian Klinger. Published by Sony Classical, 16 December 2008.
- 2009: Beethoven / Tsintsadze – Lisa Batiashvili (Violin and directing), Beethoven Violin Concerto & Sulkhan Tsintsadze, 6 Miniatures. Published by Sony Classical, 3 March 2009.
- 2011: Echoes of Time – works by Arvo Pärt, Sergei Rachmaninoff, Giya Kancheli and Dmitri Shostakovich, with Hélène Grimaud and the Bavarian Radio Symphony Orchestra under Esa-Pekka Salonen. Published by Deutsche Grammophon, 15 February 2011.
- 2013: Brahms & Clara Schumann – Brahms: Violin Concerto & Clara Schumann – Three Romances for Violin and Piano. Staatskapelle Dresden under Christian Thielemann; Alice Sara Ott and Lisa Batiashvili. Published by Deutsche Grammophon, 8 January 2013.
- 2013: Tchaikovsky: Pathétique – Tchaikovsky Symphonie No. 6 Pathétique, and Selected Romances – Opus 6 and Opus 73. Rotterdam Philharmonic Orchestra conducted by Yannick Nézet-Séguin. Published by Deutsche Grammophon, 20 September 2013.
- 2014: Bach – Lisa Batiashvili plays works by Johann Sebastian Bach and Carl Philipp Emanuel Bach. Published by Deutsche Grammophon, 16 September 2014.
- 2016: Tchaikovsky / Sibelius – Lisa Batiashvili plays Tchaikovsky Violin Concerto & Sibelius Violin Concerto with the Staatskapelle Berlin under Daniel Barenboim. Published by Deutsche Grammophon, 4 November 2016.
- 2016: Waldbühne – Czech Night – Lisa Batiashvilli's live performance with the Berlin Philharmonic, conducted by Yannick Nézet-Séguin, works by Antonín Dvořák and Bedřich Smetana. Published by EuroArt.
- 2018: Visions of Prokofiev – Violin Concertos 1&2, and excerpts from Romeo and Juliet, and the Love for Three Oranges. Published by Deutsche Grammophon.
- In addition, a variety of recordings of modern music, including Benjamin Britten, Harrison Birtwistle, Olli Mustonen and Ernst von Dohnányi
