= Cello Concerto No. 2 (Lindberg) =

2013 cello concerto by Magnus Lindberg

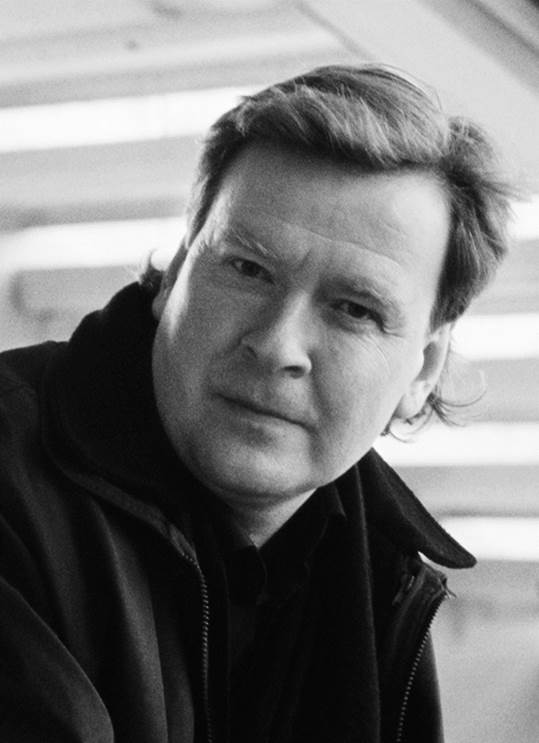
Magnus Lindberg in 2015

The Cello Concerto No. 2 is the second cello concerto by the Finnish composer Magnus Lindberg. It was commissioned by the Los Angeles Philharmonic in June 2013 to fill the planned premiere date of Oliver Knussen's then delayed Cello Concerto. The work was first performed in the Walt Disney Concert Hall, Los Angeles, on October 18, 2013, by the Finnish cellist Anssi Karttunen and the Los Angeles Philharmonic under the direction of Esa-Pekka Salonen.

== Composition ==
The concerto is composed in three numbered movements and has a duration of roughly 20 minutes.

=== Instrumentation ===
The work is scored for solo cello and an orchestra comprising two flutes, two oboes, two clarinets, two bassoons, two horns, trumpet, trombone, and strings.

== Reception ==
The cello concerto has been positively received by music critics. Reviewing the world premiere, Mark Swed of the Los Angeles Times remarked of the work, "The solo cello writing has a slightly autumnal flavor — maybe too autumnal for a vital 55-year-old composer (he was born three days before Salonen). But this is also brilliantly mature cello writing that takes full advantage of Karttunen's natural grace unruffled by even the most extreme virtuosic demands." He added, "Mainly, Lindberg exploits the cellist's mastery of nuance. The orchestra is of modest size (no percussion). Unlike in his first concerto, where cellist and orchestra are in fierce contrast, Lindberg removes conflict by painting with glowing instrumental colors an exotic sonic landscape around which the cello dives and dances and exults." Theodore Bell of Culture Spot LA called it "a wonderful concerto" and opined, "Its intensity derived from the occasional expressionist motifs mixed in with delightful tonal snippets. Themes would bounce back and forth between the orchestra and Karttunen, but the orchestral writing was relatively conventional in comparison to his endless variations of timbre and effect." Andrew Mellor of Gramophone similarly wrote, "Where Lindberg's First Cello Concerto is a more thick and integrated work than its successor, the Second varies its moods more despite restrained scoring. It has moments of blossoming lyricism, and greater spread and intensity in its solo writing, particularly in the cadenzas."
