= Yefim Bronfman =

Soviet-born Israeli-American pianist (born 1958)

- Ефим Бронфман
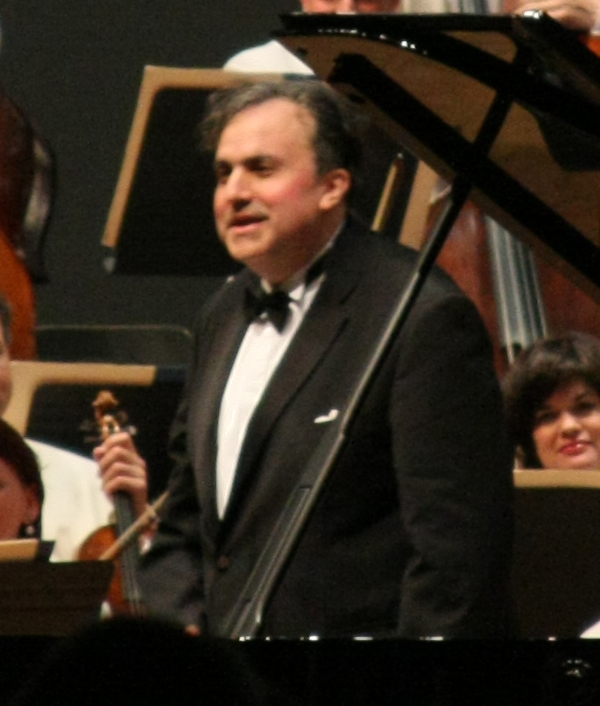
- Bronfman in 2009
- Born: Yefim Naumovich Bronfman; April 10, 1958 (age 68); Tashkent, Uzbek SSR, Soviet Union
- Occupation: Pianist

Yefim "Fima" Naumovich Bronfman (Russian: Ефим Наумович Бронфман; born April 10, 1958) is a Soviet-born Israeli-American pianist. He has performed as a soloist and with major symphony orchestras globally since 1975. He won a Grammy Award in 1997.

== Biography ==
Bronfman was born in 1958 in Tashkent, Uzbek SSR to a Jewish family of musicians. His father Naum Bronfman was concertmaster of the municipal opera orchestra, and his mother Pauline Bronfman was a pianist. His older sister Elizabeth later became a violinist with the Israel Philharmonic Orchestra. He began music lessons at age seven with his mother and attended a music school for gifted children in Tashkent. In 1970, he gave his first performance with the school orchestra playing Rachmaninoff's Piano Concerto No. 1.

He immigrated to Israel in 1973 at the age of 15. He auditioned for Eugene Istomin and made his international debut later that year under Zubin Mehta and the Israel Philharmonic Orchestra. In 1974, after a competition chaired by violinist Isaac Stern, he won a scholarship from the America-Israel Cultural Foundation (AICF). This allowed him to study under Arie Vardi, head of the Rubin Academy of Music at Tel Aviv University. He was gifted his first piano by philanthropist Fredric R. Mann.

In 1976, Bronfman moved to New York City to study under Rudolf Firkušný at the Juilliard School. He also studied under Leon Fleisher at the Marlboro Music School in Vermont and Rudolf Serkin at the Curtis Institute of Music in Philadelphia.

Bronfman made his North American debut in 1975 under Zubin Mehta and the Montreal Symphony Orchestra. He made debuts with the New York Philharmonic in 1978 performing Beethoven's Triple Concerto with violinist Shlomo Mintz and cellist Yo-Yo Ma, at Carnegie Hall in 1989, and at Avery Fisher Hall in 1993.

He became an American citizen in 1989. In 1991, after the dissolution of the Soviet Union, he returned to Russia for the first time since he was a teenager to deliver a series of joint recitals with violinist Isaac Stern.

Bronfman is a six-time Grammy Award nominee. In 1997, he won the Grammy Award for Best Instrumental Soloist Performance (with orchestra) along with Esa-Pekka Salonen and the Los Angeles Philharmonic for their recording of the three Bartók Piano Concerti. His most recent nomination was in 2014 for his recording of Piano Concerto No. 2, commissioned for him by Magnus Lindberg and performed by the New York Philharmonic.

He joined the faculty of the Curtis Institute of Music in 2020 and also teaches at the Manhattan School of Music.

== Personal life ==
Bronfman lives on the Upper West Side of Manhattan. He is interested in stamp collecting and African art.

== Awards ==
- Avery Fisher Prize (1991)
- Grammy Award (1997)
- Jean Gimbel Lane Prize in Piano Performance (2010)
- Honorary Doctorate, Manhattan School of Music (2015)
