= Al largo =

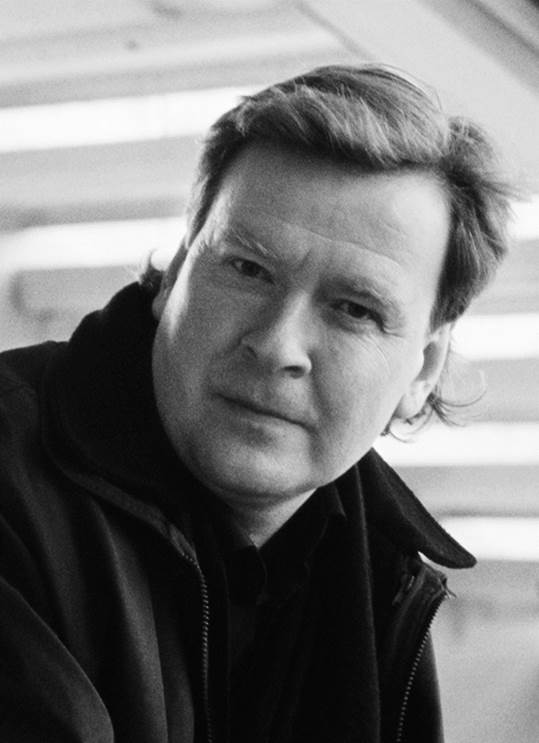
Magnus Lindberg in 2015

Al largo is a composition for orchestra by the Finnish composer Magnus Lindberg. It was commissioned by the New York Philharmonic while Lindberg served as the orchestra's composer-in-residence. Its world premiere was given by the New York Philharmonic under the direction of Alan Gilbert at Avery Fisher Hall on June 23, 2010.

== Composition ==
=== Background ===
Al largo is composed in a single movement and has a duration of roughly 25 minutes. The composer described the piece in the score program notes, writing, "This is the fastest music I've ever written, yet somewhere deep down there is a feeling of a very slow undertone and a very slow momentum, something large and wide in terms of expression. For a long time I already had an idea that I should call the work something contradictory—not something indicating a fast piece but, rather, something like Adagio or Largo." The title, which Lindberg described as "unusual," ultimately came at the suggestion of his friend and fellow composer Luca Francesconi. Lindberg recalled, "He suggested that I use the Italian expression 'Al largo,' which means being offshore, specifically referring to that moment when you reach the open sea and you don't see the coast anymore and what is before you is vast."

He continued, "Al Largo is full of fanfares and joyous noises, but somehow its main structure falls into two halves, both of them starting very energetically and ending up as slow music. I like the sound of the word largo and I like the historical ballast of the word largo; even when you put it into the context of the Italian meaning of its name context, the piece remains abstract, musically."

Lindberg cited Maurice Ravel's ballet Ma mère l'Oye and Arnold Schoenberg's Verklärte Nacht for string sextet as deciding influence in the piece's orchestration and composition. He wrote, "One of my earliest ideas with regard to this project was to create a big piece, but I didn't want to use a huge orchestra since I had done that many times in the past; I wanted the work to be more constrained, played by a smaller ensemble, and a perfect masterpiece in that category is Ravel's Ma Mère l'oye (Mother Goose), which is a gorgeous piece, particularly in the way that Ravel builds up tremendous expression with smaller resources." The composer added, "For me, the most beautiful moment in music history occurs at the end of [Schoenberg's Verklärte Nacht]. I actually worked in a one-bar quote from Verklärte Nacht at the end of Al largo. I use my own melodic material on top of it, but there is a real, small gesture toward Schoenberg. I'm still fascinated by that moment in music history, when tonality somehow collapsed."

=== Instrumentation ===
The work is scored for an orchestra consisting of two flutes (2nd doubling piccolo), oboe, cor anglais, two clarinets, bass clarinet, two bassoons (2nd doubling contrabassoon), two horns, two trumpets, two trombones, tuba, two percussionists, harp, piano, and strings.

== Reception ==
Al largo has been praised by music critics. Reviewing the world premiere, Anthony Tommasini of The New York Times described Al largo as a "a lushly colorful, brilliantly orchestrated, teeming, intriguing yet baffling work." Tommasini wrote, "The piece is basically an essay for orchestra, full of restless, swirling figures, eerie fanfares, solo flights and harmonies that stack up, note by note, to create thick, pungent masses of sound: a Lindberg trademark." He nevertheless added, "There were arresting moments in Al largo. I was never bored. But the piece did not earn its length. The flow of events sounded arbitrary, like hearing a fragmented film score without seeing the film. Still, Mr. Lindberg writes brilliantly for orchestra, and Mr. Gilbert and the Philharmonic made the most of it in this glittering, virtuosic performance." Andrew Clark of the Financial Times similarly called the work "an attractively upbeat symphonic essay." Richard Whitehouse of Gramophone favorably compared the piece to Lindberg's EXPO, remarking, "More complex in content and evolution, Al largo (2010) falls into two continuous parts – the first as dense and eventful as the second is luminous and thoughtful – with a climactic burst of energy spilling over into a Sibelian string threnody redolent of those found in numerous Lindberg orchestral works these past two decades."
