= Two Episodes =

Orchestral composition by Magnus Lindberg

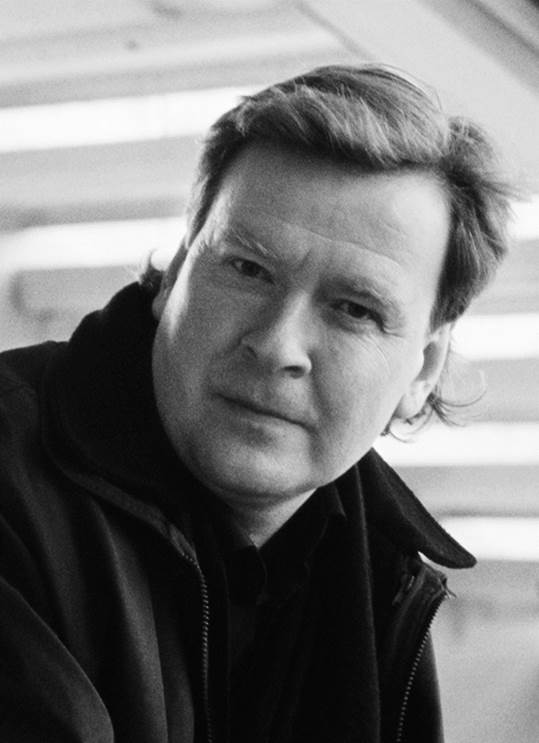
Magnus Lindberg in 2015

Two Episodes is a composition for orchestra by the Finnish composer Magnus Lindberg. The work was commissioned by the London Philharmonic Orchestra, for which Lindberg was composer-in-residence, and co-commissioned by The Proms, the Helsinki Festival, and the Casa da Música. It was first performed by the London Philharmonic Orchestra under the direction of Vladimir Jurowski in the Royal Albert Hall, London, on 24 July 2016.

== Composition ==
=== Background ===
Lindberg composed Two Episodes as both a standalone piece and as a concert opener for Beethoven's Ninth Symphony, for which it was first commissioned. Before the world premiere, Lindberg reflected:

If I was really pressed to choose just one composer from the classical canon it would have to be Beethoven because he stands out as an example of what it is to be a contemporary composer – just as much as figures like Xenakis in my own lifetime. I've re-examined his late works with fresh ears in preparing for this composition, to create music that leads naturally to the amazing opening of the Ninth Symphony but which can also have an independent life of its own.

Though Two Episodes does not directly quote the Ninth Symphony, the work is peppered with references to Beethoven's music. Lindberg remarked:

For obvious reasons, I've kept well away from all references to Beethoven's finale which has to leap out on its own terms. ... Rather than quotations, I've embedded a number of Beethovenian allusions, so there are clear aural links, and the orchestration matches the symphony, so it will have a period colour without harp, piano, and exotic percussion that feature in many of my works. The harmonic world will naturally be much later than Beethoven's, though it is the outcome of where he was heading.

=== Structure ===
Two Episodes has a duration of roughly 15 minutes and is cast in two connected movements. The first movement alludes to the opening movement of Beethoven's Ninth Symphony. The second movement similarly references the third, slow movement of Beethoven's Ninth and ends on the A and E perfect fifth that opens the symphony.

=== Instrumentation ===
The work is scored for an orchestra comprising two flutes, a piccolo, two oboes, a cor anglais, three clarinets, a bass clarinet, two bassoons, contrabassoon, four horns, three trumpets, three trombones, timpani, three percussionists, and strings.

== Reception ==
Two Episodes has received a mixed response from music critics. Reviewing the world premiere, Richard Fairman of the Financial Times wrote, "At about 15 minutes, the work offers a luminescent short journey through terrain familiar from Ravel and Respighi, like a widescreen travelogue filmed with saturated colours through a high-performance lens. The LPO made a virtuoso job of it, though any relevance to Beethoven remained unclear." Erica Jeal of The Guardian also praised the piece, opining, "It's the iconic first gesture of the symphony – that falling figure tracing the sparest possible harmony – that is a recurring motif in Lindberg's score, glimpsed through whirling violins at the opening, and cutting through the almost Mahlerian textures several times thereafter. Future performances might find Two Episodes standing on its own, without the symphony; but while those audiences might not get to hear the Beethoven, they will certainly think of it."

Ivan Hewett of The Daily Telegraph was more critical of the music, however, writing, "On paper, his idea of taking key phrases from Beethoven's piece, such as the thrilling opening with its sense of huge beckoning spaces, and leading them into his own richly coloured, swirling orchestral world seemed promising. Certainly one could spot Beethoven's ideas, whirling past like pieces of flotsam on the surging orchestral tide." He continued, "As always, Lindberg's turbo-charged musical machine invited us to sit back and enjoy the ride, but this time it was just too obvious the machine was running on empty. The sumptuous water-fall of Debussyan harmonies seemed entirely devoid of ideas (apart from Beethoven's, that is). Richard Strauss once said he 'wanted to compose as the cow gives milk'. Lindberg could now say the same, except that in his case the milk is curdled." David Nice of The Arts Desk was similarly critical of the piece, remarking:

Unless the Beethoven references are plain, it seems like megalomania to advertise your new work as a complement to the Ninth. Other than the final change of direction towards where Beethoven's symphony so radically starts, the only sounds audibly homaged in the Lindberg premiere were those of early 20th century French scores, ravishingly delivered by the London Philharmonic strings in multi-divided chords. Where Boulez moved on from that coloristic starting point, Lindberg seemed mired in anachronism. First trumpeter Paul Beniston's opening top line was brilliant and arresting as usual, and Jurowski kept an immaculately-prepared performance rhythmically taut and instrumentally well balanced. But who Lindberg really is these days, and what if anything he had to say with this insubstantial curtain-raiser, remained open to question.
