= Sculpture (Lindberg) =

2005 orchestral composition by Magnus Lindberg

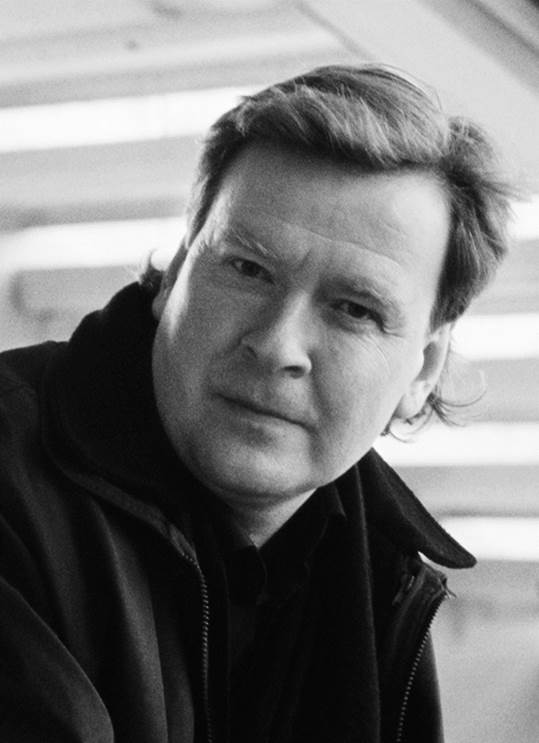
Magnus Lindberg in 2015

Sculpture is an orchestral composition by the Finnish composer Magnus Lindberg. The music was commissioned by the Los Angeles Philharmonic with support from the Koussevitzky Music Foundation to celebrate the orchestra's inaugural season at the Walt Disney Concert Hall. Its world premiere was given by the Los Angeles Philharmonic under the direction of Esa-Pekka Salonen on October 6, 2005.

== Composition ==
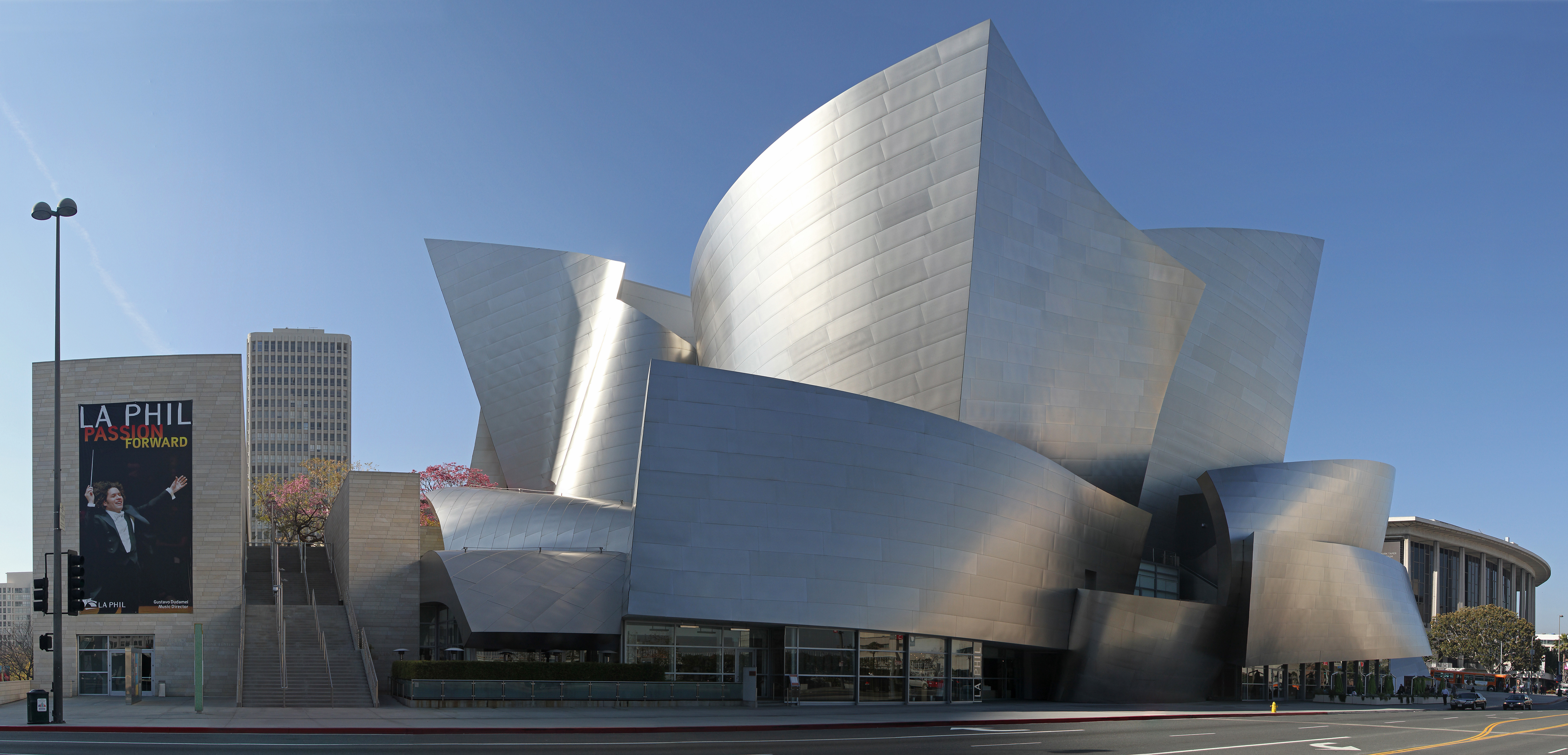
Sculpture was inspired by the design of the Walt Disney Concert Hall by the architect Frank Gehry.

=== Background ===
Sculpture has a duration of roughly 23 minutes and is cast in one continuous movement. Its composition was largely inspired by the design of the Walt Disney Concert Hall by the architect Frank Gehry. The concert hall has also inspired such pieces as John Williams's Soundings and Esa-Pekka Salonen's Wing on Wing.

=== Instrumentation ===
The work is scored for a large orchestra consisting of three flutes (3rd doubling piccolo), alto flute, three oboes, cor anglais, three clarinets (3rd doubling bass clarinet), bass clarinet, three bassoons, (3rd doubling contrabassoon), contrabassoon, six horns (5th and 6th doubling Wagner tubas), four trumpets, four trombones, two tubas, timpani, four percussionists, two pianos (2nd doubling organ), two harps, and strings (no violins).

== Reception ==
Sculpture has been praised by music critics. Reviewing the world premiere, Mark Swed of the Los Angeles Times described the score as "sophisticated yet immediately engrossing" and wrote, "The orchestral writing is that of a master. Disney Hall is especially happy with bass notes, and Lindberg gave it its fill. The bouncy fanfare figures are not blatant but more like a filigree. The instrumental texture is often fast-moving and complex. A Sibelius sense of mysterious winds blowing everything around is strong at first." He added, "In the middle, Sculpture turns into a miniature concerto for orchestra, focusing on different instrumental sections competing to be the most dazzling. The piece climaxes with rousing Stravinskyan rhythms. The score's 23 minutes fly by. The performance was spectacular."

Reviewing a 2008 recording of the work, Richard Whitehouse of Gramophone declared Sculpture "quite a piece with which to have opened the Walt Disney Concert Hall" and compared the work favorably to Lindberg's Concerto for Orchestra, saying it "seems intent on righting its predecessor's wrongs – not least in its skilful mediating between extremes of motion without sacrificing either harmonic or textural intricacy, with a final section that fairly saturates the sound-space." The music was similarly praised by Joshua Kosman of the San Francisco Chronicle and Steven Pritchard of The Observer. Andrew Clements of The Guardian called the piece a "striking" example of "Lindberg's recent style, in which the control over harmony and structure is as rigorous as ever, but the gestural surface of the music is more immediately involving than in his earlier works."

== Recording ==
A recording of Sculpture, performed by the Finnish Radio Symphony Orchestra under the direction of Sakari Oramo, was released through Ondine on January 1, 2008. The album also features Lindberg's Campana in Aria and his Concerto for Orchestra.
