= Cantigas (Lindberg) =

Orchestral composition by Magnus Lindberg

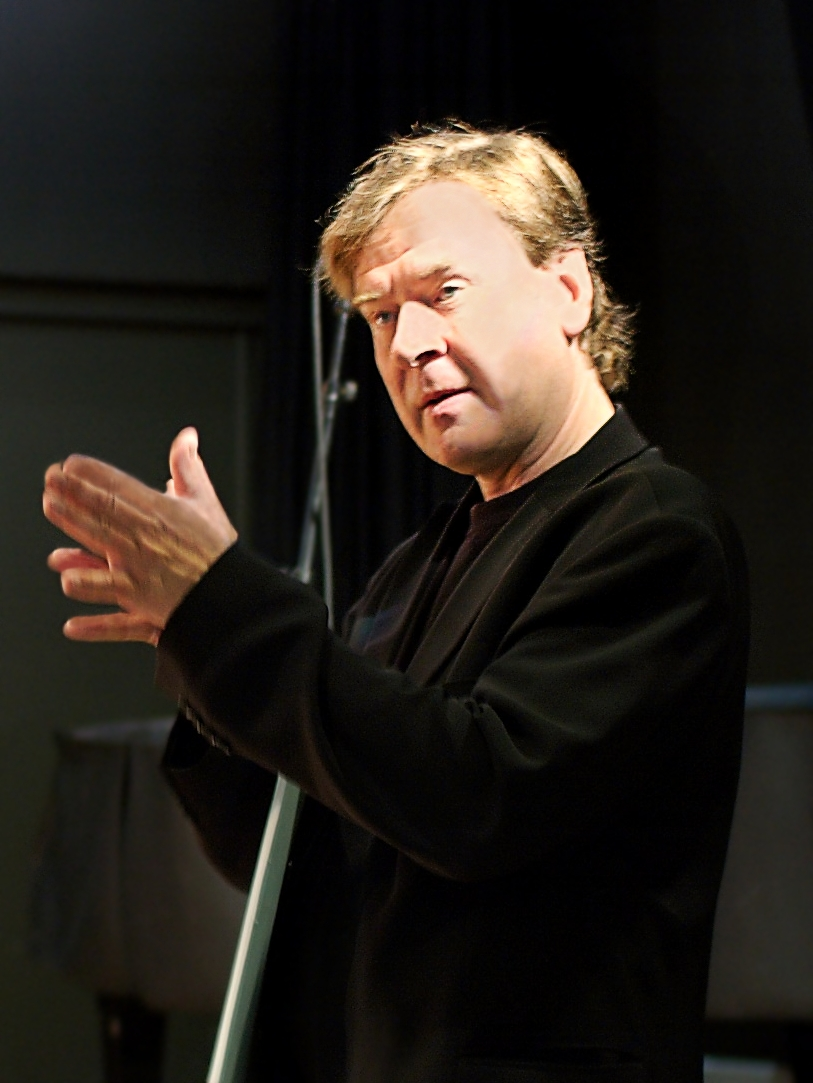
Magnus Lindberg in 2006

Cantigas is an orchestral composition by the Finnish composer Magnus Lindberg. The work was commissioned by the Cleveland Orchestra and was composed between 1998 and early 1999. Its world premiere was performed in Cleveland by the Cleveland Orchestra under the direction of Christoph von Dohnányi on April 1, 1999.

== Composition ==
Cantigas is composed in a single movement and has a duration of roughly 19 minutes.

=== Instrumentation ===
The work is scored for a large orchestra consisting of three flutes (3rd doubling piccolo), two oboes, cor anglais, three clarinets (3rd doubling E♭ clarinet), bass clarinet (doubling contrabass clarinet), two bassoons, contrabassoon, four horns, four trumpets (4th doubling piccolo trumpet), three trombones, tuba timpani, three percussionists, harp, piano (doubling celesta), and strings.

== Reception ==
Cantigas has been praised by music critics. James R. Oestreich of The New York Times described the music as "glacially shifting blocks of harmony giving rise to explosions of strident color." Keith Potter of The Independent wrote, "Cantigas was written in 1998–99 for the Cleveland Orchestra and lasts around 20 minutes. It is thus a recent example of Lindberg's considerable prowess as a purveyor of brightly coloured, brilliantly orchestrated scores, including a much higher percentage of genuinely fast music than composers tend to produce these days. It is also, however, a good example of its creator's move away from rhythm, gesture and sheer sonority as prime features to greater concern for harmonic thinking in the context of goal-directed structures." Gramophone similarly observed:

Cantigas begins calmly‚ the interval of a perfect fifth permeating its opening oboe melody. The argument quickly turns dark‚ extravagant and very loud‚ with the exceptionally busy surfaces that are a hallmark of this composer's work. Some find the effect exhilarating. Others I know suspect that the near constant presence of rapid figuration coruscating over slowermoving harmonies is driven by the availability of appropriate software. Wonderfully limpid passages‚ as exquisitely scored as anything in Oliver Knussen‚ coexist with near cacophony. There may be a lack of heart‚ but‚ as in much of Lindberg's recent music‚ the musical current is immensely compelling‚ the colours are precisely applied‚ and the closing bars bring a genuine and surprising sense of apotheosis.

== Recording ==
A commercial recording of Cantigas, performed by the Philharmonia Orchestra under the direction of Esa-Pekka Salonen, was released through Sony Classical Records in 2002. The album also features Lindberg's Cello Concerto No. 1, Parada, and Fresco.
