= Violin Concerto No. 2 (Lindberg) =

2015 composition by Magnus Lindberg

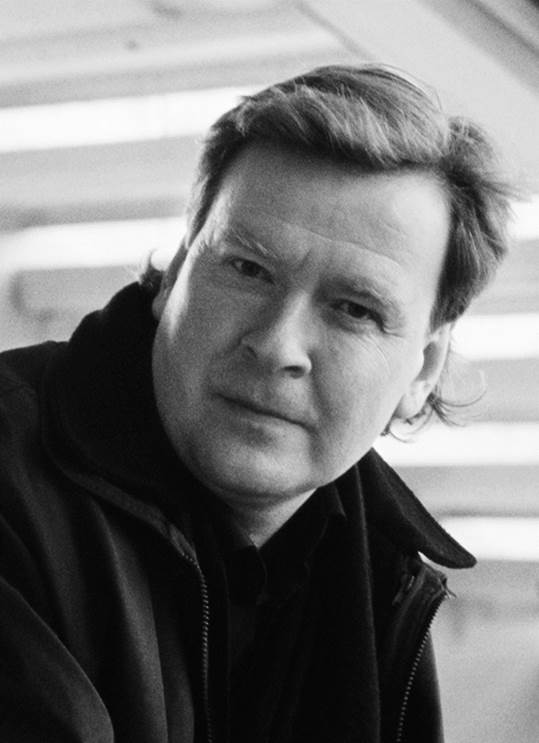
Magnus Lindberg in 2015

The Violin Concerto No. 2 is a composition for violin solo and orchestra by the Finnish composer Magnus Lindberg. The work was jointly commissioned by the London Philharmonic Orchestra, the Berlin Philharmonic, Swedish Radio Symphony Orchestra, Radio France, and New York Philharmonic. Its world premiere was given by the violinist Frank Peter Zimmermann and the London Philharmonic Orchestra under the direction of Jaap van Zweden at Royal Festival Hall, London, on December 9, 2015. The piece is dedicated to Zimmermann.

== Composition ==
The concerto has a duration of approximately 25 minutes and is cast in three movements played without pause.

=== Instrumentation ===
The work is scored for solo violin and an orchestra consisting of two flutes (2nd doubling piccolo), two oboes, two clarinets, bass clarinet, two bassoons, four horns, two trumpets, three trombones, timpani, two percussionists, harp, celesta, and strings.

== Reception ==
The concerto has received a positive response from music critics. Reviewing the world premiere, Ivan Hewett of The Daily Telegraph compared the work favorably to Lindberg's Violin Concerto No. 1, saying:

it proved to be a bigger-boned, more expansive utterance than his first [and] reminded us why Lindberg is the go-to composer for many orchestras in search of a user-friendly premiere. It gave an agreeable sense that modernist abstraction doesn't have to be penitentially austere, in fact it can be made to sound positively gorgeous.

Richard Fairman of the Financial Times wrote:

His new violin concerto unfolds with a massive, expansive feel to it, like the soundtrack to some epic Scandinavian film noir. Musical theorists will be pleased to note that a large proportion of the score is derived from a three-chord progression played by the violin at the outset, so there is no lack of technical discipline. The atmosphere, though, is brooding. From time to time soloist Frank Peter Zimmermann laboured over passages full of notes that do not seem to be going anywhere — but each time the concerto gets to its next destination, a panoramic vista opens up of dark clouds over forests and lakes, of repressed passions and baleful desires. Perhaps there is a film composer inside Lindberg struggling to get out.

Reviewing the New York City premiere, James R. Oestreich of The New York Times similarly observed:

The work, in three continuous movements interrupted only by an extended cadenza, is big and attractive, deeply satisfying in its proportions and contours.

Sean Piccoli of the New York Classical Review was more critical of the piece, however, remarking:

The concerto is an attractive set piece for reconciling Respighi's love of orderly harmony within Stravinsky's search for beauty in chaos. How it fared strictly on its own terms, as a standalone work of three movements including a fiery cadenza, was less certain.
