= Piano Concerto No. 3 (Lindberg) =

Composition by Magnus Lindberg

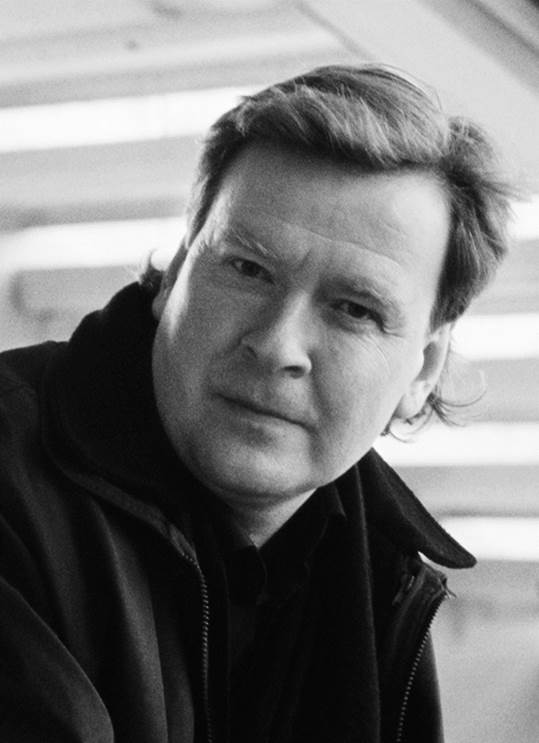
Magnus Lindberg in 2015

The Piano Concerto No. 3 is a composition for solo piano and orchestra by the Finnish composer Magnus Lindberg. The work was jointly commissioned by China National Centre for The Performing Arts, San Francisco Symphony, Toronto Symphony Orchestra, Philharmonie de Paris - Orchestre de Paris, NDR Elbphilharmonie Orchester, and the New York Philharmonic.

Lindberg wrote the piece for pianist Yuja Wang after hearing her play piano concertos No. 1 and 2 by Dmitri Shostakovich together at a concert with the NDR Elbphilharmonie Orchester conducted by Alan Gilbert in September 2019. Wang was originally scheduled to perform its world premiere in China, but the COVID-19 pandemic postponed the premiere to 13 October 2022 at Davies Symphony Hall, where Wang was the soloist with the San Francisco Symphony conducted by Lindberg's friend, his Finnish compatriot Esa-Pekka Salonen.

== Composition ==
Composition of the concerto took 22 months, possibly due to the COVID-19 pandemic. Wang helped influence the concerto, collaborating with the composer up through the final week before the premiere: "trimming things" and "cleaning up ... It’s a work in progress”, according to Lindberg in a Q&A after the premiere. Wang added, “The piece will grow with how we play it.”

Lindberg cites the Bartók Piano Concerto No. 3 and the Rachmaninoff Piano Concerto No. 3 as inspirations for this concerto, and many listeners find additional references to Ravel, Sibelius, Tchaikovsky, Debussy, Prokofiev, Liszt and Gershwin in the music. Lindberg includes two long cadenzas for the soloist.

The piano concerto has a duration of roughly 32 minutes and is written in three movements in a conventional fast-slow-fast plan, "with two extroverted showpieces flanking a somewhat more reflective center". Lindberg describes the movements as "three concertos in one piece", or "a concerto in three concertos." "Each movement opens with an intense dialogue between piano and strings, which then gives over to further dialogue between piano and winds, followed by a synthesis."

Overall, the concerto is huge; Lindberg says "it’s the biggest piece I’ve written." In terms of the technical skills demanded from the soloist, this is considered the most difficult among Lindberg's three piano concertos, since he wrote it specifically to fit Wang's immense abilities.

== Reception ==
The world premiere drew generally positive acclaim about the performance by the soloist Wang, while opinions about the composition itself were more mixed.

Joshua Kosman of the San Francisco Chronicle found "his insistence on filling in every corner of the sonic canvas - more wearying than enlightening", though "there’s a vibrancy and inventive energy to his music, even at its most overwritten, that commands attention and engagement. ".

David Mermelstein of the Wall Street Journal thought "the composer achieves that rarest of admixtures, a work that recalls the greatness of others while creating a sound world entirely his own", though "the third movement, at least on first hearing, seems to lack some of the sonic invention of what proceeds it."

Despite Lindberg's claims about dialogue, David Bratman of San Francisco Classical Voice described the work as "piano and orchestra run along together in dense combination without dialogue or exchange. Frequently the piano becomes inaudible underneath the orchestra".

Jari Kalliio was most enthusiastic; he wrote in Finnish Music Quarterly: "The new concerto fuses together the composer’s virtuosic grasp of the musical form, exuberantly pianistic writing and riveting orchestral mastery, giving rise to a thirty-minute score of special magnificence" and "is on its way to become a repertory item."
