= Concerto for Orchestra (Lindberg) =

Composition by Magnus Lindberg

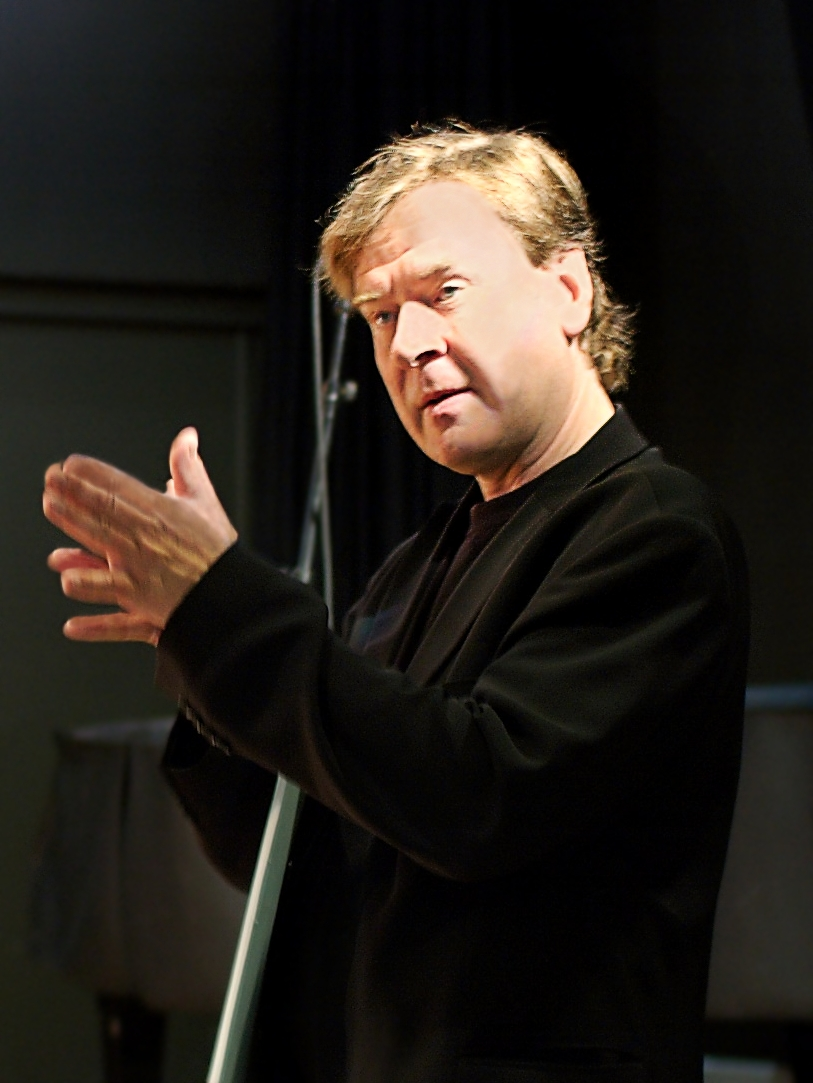
Magnus Lindberg in 2006

The Concerto for Orchestra is an orchestral composition by the Finnish composer Magnus Lindberg. The work was commissioned by the BBC and was composed between 2002 and 2003. It was given its world premiere by the BBC Symphony Orchestra under the direction of Jukka-Pekka Saraste on September 30, 2003, at the Barbican Centre, London.

== Composition ==
The Concerto for Orchestra has a duration of roughly 28 minutes and is composed in five numbered movements played without pause.

=== Instrumentation ===
The work is scored for a large orchestra comprising three flutes (3rd doubling alto flute and piccolo), three oboes (3rd doubling cor anglais), four clarinets (3rd doubling E♭ clarinet; 4th doubling bass clarinet), three bassoons (3rd doubling contrabassoon), four horns, four trumpets (4th doubling trumpet in D), three trombones, tuba, timpani, three percussionists, piano (doubling celesta), harp, and strings.

== Reception ==
The Concerto for Orchestra has been praised by music critics. Steven Pritchard of The Guardian compared the work favorably to Lindberg's Campana In Aria, saying the "Concerto for Orchestra is altogether more commanding." Annette Morreau of The Independent wrote, "In recent years, Lindberg has written a series of purely orchestral pieces and a series of concertos; this work is a triumphant combination of the two with real concertante demands on all sections of the orchestra and the occasional big solo for individual members." She added, "Lindberg, in his mid-forties, has come of age: this is a piece on another level with extraordinary confidence, boldness of gesture and an architectural logic that makes it at once familiar. Lindberg's harmonic language is now so rich and varied, consonance, if anything, more evident than dissonance." The music was similarly praised by Steven Pritchard of The Observer and Joshua Kosman of the San Francisco Chronicle, who called the piece "a grandiose canvas". Andrew Clements of The Guardian compared the work to Lindberg's Sculpture, observing:

The Concerto for Orchestra of 2003, and Sculpture, composed for the Frank Gehry-designed Walt Disney Hall in Los Angeles two years later, are striking examples of Lindberg's recent style, in which the control over harmony and structure is as rigorous as ever, but the gestural surface of the music is more immediately involving than in his earlier works. Both pieces move smoothly through their sectional forms, with the Concerto spotlighting various instrumental groups in turn in an overarching scheme that is Lindberg's take on the baroque chaconne, while Sculpture is framed by fanfares, with far-flung brass groups stationed around the auditorium.

Conversely, Richard Whitehouse of Gramophone was more critical of the work, remarking:

Each decade in his maturity has seen Lindberg pen an orchestral work as a statement of intent: thus the modernist outpouring of Kraft (1985), then the reconciliation of innovation and tradition in Aura (1994). Fine that the Concerto for Orchestra (2003) is a further step along this path, but quality is simply lacking – whether in the actual ideas or, especially, the interplay of textures such that the harmonies sound derivative of earlier works, while melodic lines are insufficiently defined. Ensemble writing in the latter half fails to sustain momentum, and the apotheosis is perfunctory by Lindberg's standards.

== Recording ==
A recording of the Concerto for Orchestra, performed by the Finnish Radio Symphony Orchestra under the direction of Sakari Oramo, was released through Ondine on January 1, 2008. The album also features Lindberg's Sculpture and Campana in Aria.
