= Violin Concerto No. 2 =

Violin Concerto No. 2 may refer to any composer's second violin concerto:

- Violin Concerto No. 2 (Bartók) in B minor
- Violin Concerto No. 2 (Bruch) in D minor
- Violin Concerto No. 2 (Glass), The American Four Seasons
- Violin Concerto No. 2 in D major, by Joseph Haydn (lost)
- Violin Concerto No. 2 (Joachim) in D minor
- Violin Concerto No. 2 (Lindberg)
- Violin Concerto No. 2 (Martinů) in G minor
- Violin Concerto No. 2 (Mozart) in D major
- Violin Concerto No. 2 (Paganini) in B minor
- Violin Concerto No. 2 (Piston)
- Violin Concerto No. 2 (Prokofiev) in G minor
- Violin Concerto No. 2 (Saint-Saëns) in C major
- Violin Concerto No. 2 (Shostakovich) in C-sharp minor
- Violin Concerto No. 2 (Vieuxtemps) in F-sharp minor, Sauret by Henri Vieuxtemps
- Violin Concerto No. 2 (Wieniawski) in D minor
- Violin Concerto No. 2 (Williams)

== See also ==
- Violin Concerto
- List of compositions for violin and orchestra
