= Souvenir (Magnus Lindberg) =

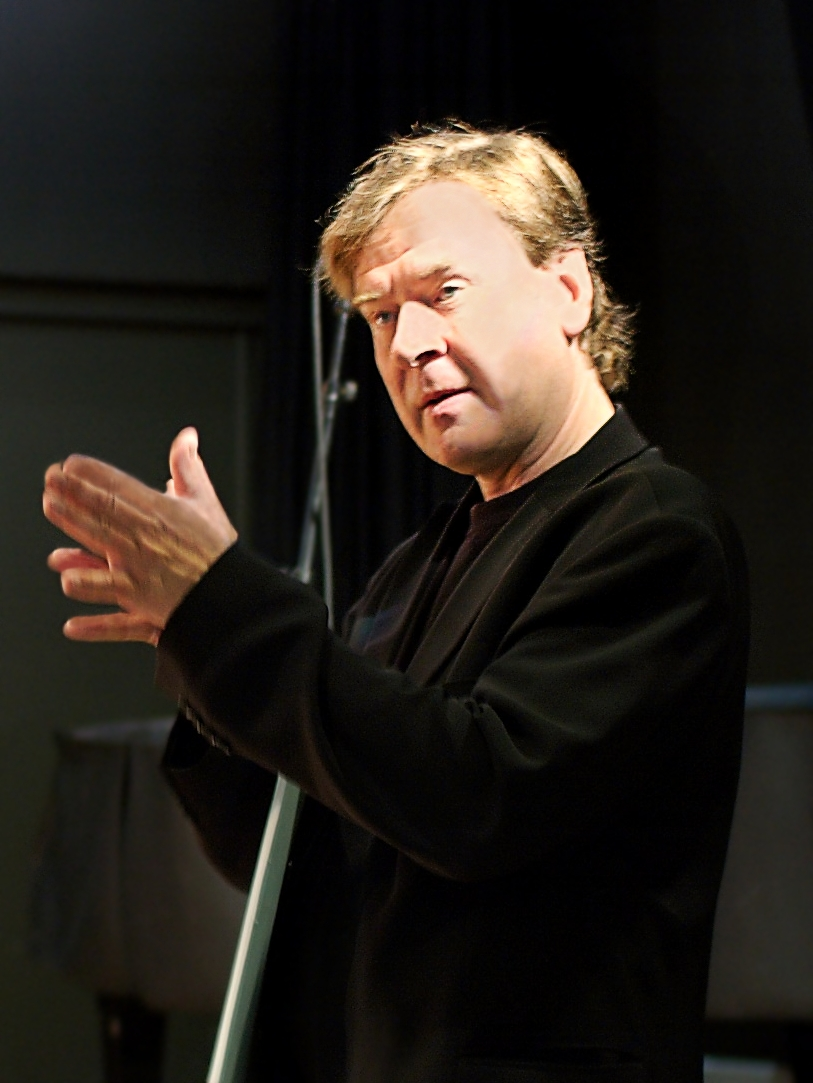
Composer Magnus Lindberg

Souvenir is a composition for chamber orchestra by the Finnish composer Magnus Lindberg. The work was commissioned by the New York Philharmonic, for which Lindberg was then composer-in-residence. It was given its world premiere on November 19, 2010, at Symphony Space, New York City, by the New York Philharmonic under the direction of Alan Gilbert. The piece was written in memoriam for Lindberg's friend and fellow composer Gérard Grisey.

== Composition ==
Souvenir has a duration of roughly 25 minutes and is composed in three numbered movements.

=== Instrumentation ===
The work is scored for a chamber orchestra comprising flute, oboe, clarinet, bassoon, two horns, trumpet, trombone, tuba, two percussionists, harp, piano, and a reduced string section of only five players (violin I & II, viola, cello, and double bass).

== Reception ==
Reviewing the world premiere, Anthony Tommasini of The New York Times said that Lindberg "certainly knows how to conjure up wondrous sounds" and wrote:

It began with a series of emphatic processional chords, almost like a funeral procession, though too assertive for that. Each chord unleashed reactive bursts of quiet, scurrying figures and riffs that eventually coalesced into action. During the reflective second movement and the bustling, densely layered yet always lucidly textured last movement, Mr. Lindberg's distinctive harmonic language came through, neither tonal nor atonal, but shimmering, diaphanous and pungent.

David Fanning of Gramophone said, "Despite his antipathy to the designation, he has acknowledged that the three movements are conceived as a type of chamber symphony, and they certainly have the leanness, range of texture and character, concentration and sense of evolution that are worthy of that name." He added, "Admittedly, following the train of thought isn't always straightforward, and once again I have concerns about a shortish concluding movement that feels almost perfunctory. However, in this case repeated listening certainly pays off." of the Chicago Classical Review similarly observed, "Cast in three movements spanning 25 minutes, Souvenir is a symphony in all but name. Unlike many of his scores, often written for Brobdingnagian forces, Souvenir is crafted on a smaller scale for just 18 musicians, yet the work pulses with intense rhythmic dynamism and varied colors and creates a huge sonic impact."

Conversely, Andrew Clements of The Guardian described the piece as "rather overblown".
