= Feria (Magnus Lindberg) =

Feria is an orchestral composition written by Magnus Lindberg between 1995 and 1997. It was premiered by the Finnish Radio Symphony under Jukka-Pekka Saraste on 11 August 1997 in London, in the 30th concert of the 1997 BBC Proms.

The work, lasting around 17 minutes, quotes Claudio Monteverdi's Lasciatemi morire from Lamento d'Arianna in its central section. Its title alludes to the Spanish term for fair, stating its exuberant, festive mood.

== Instrumentation ==
The work is scored for a large orchestra comprising two flutes, piccolo, two oboes, cor anglais, two three clarinets, bass clarinet, two bassoons, contrabassoon, four horns, three trumpets, three trombones, tuba, timpani, two percussionists, harp, piano (doubling celesta), and strings.

== Recordings ==
- Finnish Radio Symphony – Jukka-Pekka Saraste. Ondine, 1998.
