= Fresco (Lindberg) =

1998 orchestral composition by Magnus Lindberg

Fresco is an orchestral composition by the Finnish composer Magnus Lindberg. The work was commissioned by the Los Angeles Philharmonic. Its world premiere was given in Los Angeles on March 12, 1998, by the Los Angeles Philharmonic under the direction of Esa-Pekka Salonen, to whom the piece is dedicated.

== Composition ==
Fresco is composed in one continuous movement and has a duration of approximately 22 minutes. The title refers to fresco paintings, which Lindberg has compared to a composer's painting with orchestral colors and textures.

=== Instrumentation ===
The work is scored for a large orchestra consisting of two flutes, piccolo (doubling alto flute), two oboes, cor anglais, three clarinets (3rd doubling E-flat clarinet), bass clarinet, two bassoons, contrabassoon, four horns, four trumpets, four trombones, tuba, three percussionists, piano (doubling celesta), harp, and strings.

== Reception ==
Reviewing the world premiere, Mark Swed of the Los Angeles Times highly praised the piece, writing:

Fresco, which lasts nearly 22 minutes, feels very much like music about the world before and after humanity. The primitive implications are at the beginning, with prominent high bassoons that bring The Rite of Spring to mind. But for the rest, this is a complex weaving of inhuman sonorities. Lindberg uses the orchestra as if it were one massive instrument full of ever-changing textures. He has made a structure out of alternating what he calls soft and loud styles. But the music is too full for that to seem particularly striking on first hearing.

Swed continued, "Instead it is the play of light and dark, of colors and textures, that commands attention. It is the orchestra as night sky, with more texture than we can ever penetrate."

BBC Music Magazine similarly remarked, "In Fresco, Lindberg contrasts music of almost chamber-like delicacy with characteristically huge chords topped by screaming brass. The composer refers to the latter as 'pillars' and there is indeed an architectural strength and solidity sensed throughout Lindberg's music. Immensely powerful structures are sustained like a massive bridge, with periodic moments of crisis, allowing the tension (but never the interest) to dip before once more building to a climax." Gramophone contrasted the piece with Lindberg's Cantigas , writing, "Fresco [...] ends on a unison but doesn't 'resolve' its argument in quite the same way; it may prove a tougher nut to crack."

== Recording ==
A commercial recording of Fresco, performed by the Philharmonia Orchestra under the direction of Salonen, was released through Sony Classical Records in 2002. The album also features Lindberg's Cantigas, Cello Concerto No. 1, and Parada.
