= Aura (Magnus Lindberg) =

1994 composition by Magnus Lindberg

Aura (In memoriam Witold Lutosławski) is a composition for orchestra by the Finnish composer Magnus Lindberg. The work was commissioned by Suntory for the 1994 Suntory International program for music composition. Its world premiere was given on June 11, 1994 in Tokyo by the Tokyo Symphony Orchestra under the direction of Kazufumi Yamashita. The piece is dedicated to the memory of the Polish composer Witold Lutosławski, who died partway through its composition.

== Composition ==
=== Background ===
Aura has a duration of roughly 40 minutes and is cast in four movements played without pause. Lindberg described the piece in the score program notes, writing, "Aura is in many ways the synthesis of the different approaches I have had to the orchestra in my earlier works. When working on a large scale, it is evident that one is more concerned with formal problems. The architectonical large form and the balance between material and form became much more important to control."

Lindberg credited much of the music's form to the Polish composer Witold Lutosławski, writing, "One of the composers of our century who has renewed the relation between form and content is Witold Lutoslawski. His idea of a two part form with a presentation of material and qualities without any directional tendencies in the first movement, continued by a second movement where the material grows to an entity, is a genuine and clear approach to form today." Lutosławski died in February 1994 during the composition process, prompting Lindberg to dedicate the piece in his memory. He wrote, "I wanted to contribute somehow to his memory and felt that the least I could do was to dedicate Aura to the memory of this great composer."

Regarding the designation of the work, Lindberg remarked, "I believe the overall form of Aura would make it appropriate to call the piece a symphony. But still, it is not a symphony. The piece could more easily be called a concerto for an orchestra, yet it isn't that either. Instruments and instrumental groups are often treated in a very virtuosic way, but this is more the result of a certain treatment of the material than an instrumental approach."

=== Instrumentation ===
The work is scored for a large orchestra consisting of two flutes, piccolo, two oboes, cor anglais, three clarinets (3rd doubling E-flat clarinet), bass clarinet, two bassoons, contrabassoon, four horns, three trumpets (3rd doubling bass trumpet), three trombones, tuba, timpani, three percussionists, harp, piano (doubling celesta), and strings.

== Reception ==
Aura has been heralded by music critics as one of Lindberg's finest compositions. John Allison of The Daily Telegraph called it a "masterpiece." Reviewing a 2002 performance by the Philharmonia Orchestra, Andrew Clements of The Guardian described it as "arguably Lindberg's finest work" and wrote, "Aura is an astounding enough experience on disc, but heard live in a performance as vivid as this one, the sheer detail and virtuosity of Lindberg's invention and the unerring logic of his harmonic scheme are overwhelming. It becomes one of the most exhilarating journeys that contemporary music has to offer." Calum MacDonald BBC Music Magazine similarly observed, "Lindberg's ability to impart purposeful harmonic direction to complex textural invention is one of his most impressive compositional strengths. Nowhere is this quality more magisterially displayed than in Aura, with its strong and surprising cadential gestures emerging from roiling clouds of constellated heterophony." Gramophone wrote:

Playing for some 37 minutes, Aura falls into four continuous sections (...), defined as much by variety of incident as by contrast in character. A lengthy gathering of, and focusing on salient ideas leads to a powerfully sustained phase of monumental imagery and grandeur worthy of Bruckner, before a 'scherzo' of great cumulative energy overspills into a 'finale' which draws together the conflicting elements into a peroration of Sibelian inevitability. Decidedly, but not intrinsically, symphonic, Lindberg's ideas are not so sharply defined, or evolve so organically, that they form a genuinely symphonic discourse.
