= Piano Concerto No. 2 =

Piano Concerto No. 2 refers to the second piano concerto written by one of a number of composers:

- Piano Concerto No. 2 (Bartók) in G major
- Piano Concerto No. 2 (Beethoven) in B♭ major
- Piano Concerto No. 2 (Brahms) in B♭ major
- Piano Concerto No. 2 (Chopin) in F minor
- Piano Concerto No. 2 (Field) in A♭ major
- Piano Concerto No. 2 (Ginastera)
- Piano Concerto No. 2 (Glass), After Lewis and Clark
- Piano Concerto No. 2 (Hummel) in A minor
- Piano Concerto No. 2 (Kabalevsky) in G minor
- Piano Concerto No. 2 (Lindberg)
- Piano Concerto No. 2 (Liszt) in A major
- Piano Concerto No. 2 (MacDowell) in D minor
- Piano Concerto No. 2 (MacMillan)
- Piano Concerto No. 2 (Mendelssohn) in D minor
- Piano Concerto No. 2 (Moszkowski) in E major
- Piano Concerto No. 2 (Mozart) in B♭ major
- Piano Concerto No. 2 (Prokofiev) in G minor
- Piano Concerto No. 2 (Rachmaninoff) in C minor
- Piano Concerto No. 2 (Rautavaara)
- Piano Concerto No. 2 (Rubinstein) in F major
- Piano Concerto No. 2 (Saint-Saëns) in G minor
- Piano Concerto No. 2 (Shostakovich) in F major
- Piano Concerto No. 2 (Tchaikovsky) in G major
- Piano Concerto No. 2 (Villa-Lobos)

== See also ==
- Tschaikovsky Piano Concerto No. 2 (ballet), a 1941 ballet by George Balanchine
- List of compositions for piano and orchestra
