= François Leleux =

French oboist (born 1971)

- Born: July 1971 (age 55); Croix, Nord, France
- Genre: Classical
- Occupations: Musician, conductor, professor
- Instrument: Oboe

François Leleux (born July 1971 in Croix, Nord) is a French oboist, conductor, and professor.

== Biography ==
His professional career began at 18 when he became principal oboe at the Paris Opera. He went on to win a solo position at the Bavarian Radio Symphony Orchestra and later became principal oboe of the Chamber Orchestra of Europe in 2003. As an oboist, he has appeared as soloist with orchestras including the New York Philharmonic, Deutsches Symphonie-Orchester Berlin, Royal Stockholm Philharmonic Orchestra, Royal Liverpool Philharmonic Orchestra, Budapest Festival Orchestra, Swedish Radio Symphony Orchestra and NHK Symphony Orchestra.

Leleux has also developed a parallel career as a conductor. He has served as Artistic Partner of Camerata Salzburg, Artist-in-Association with the Orchestre de Chambre de Paris, and artist-in-residence with ensembles including the hr-Sinfonieorchester, Orchestre philharmonique de Strasbourg, Berner Symphonieorchester, Norwegian Chamber Orchestra and Orquesta Sinfónica de Tenerife. From the 2025/26 season, he serves as Artistic Director of Kammerakademie Potsdam and Principal Guest Artist of the Hungarian National Philharmonic Orchestra.

As a chamber musician, Leleux performs with the woodwind ensemble Les Vents Français and with long-standing recital partners including violinist Lisa Batiashvili, pianist Eric Le Sage and pianist Emmanuel Strosser. He has commissioned works from composers including Nicolas Bacri, Michael Jarrell, Giya Kancheli, Thierry Pécou, Gilles Silvestrini and Éric Tanguy; with Batiashvili he gave premiere performances of Thierry Escaich's Double Concerto for Violin and Oboe with the NDR Elbphilharmonie Orchestra and the New York Philharmonic.

His recordings include albums for Sony Classical, Warner Classics, Linn Records and Pentatone. His discography includes works by J. S. Bach with the Chamber Orchestra of Europe, Mozart with Camerata Salzburg, Strauss's Oboe Concerto with the Swedish Radio Symphony Orchestra under Daniel Harding, Bienvenue en France with Emmanuel Strosser, and an award-winning recording of works by Hummel and Haydn with the Münchener Kammerorchester. He is professor at the Hochschule für Musik und Theater München.

Leleux is married to violinist Lisa Batiashvili.
