= Parada (Lindberg) =

Orchestral composition

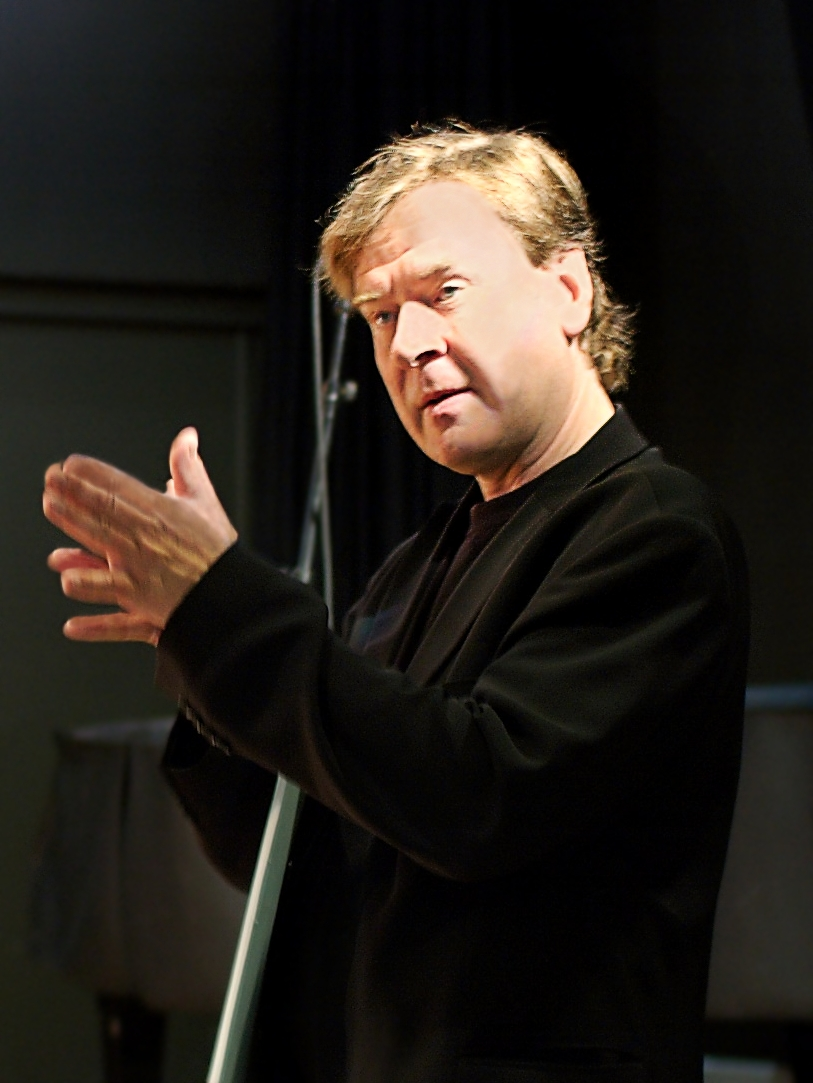
Magnus Lindberg in 2006

Parada is an orchestral composition by the Finnish composer Magnus Lindberg. The piece was composed for the music festival Related Rocks which celebrates the works of Lindberg and related composers. Its world premiere was given at The Anvil, Basingstoke on February 6, 2002 by the Philharmonia Orchestra under the direction of Esa-Pekka Salonen, to whom the work is dedicated.

== Composition ==
Parada is composed in a single slow movement and has a duration of approximately 13 minutes.

=== Instrumentation ===
The work is scored for a large orchestra consisting of two flutes (2nd doubling piccolo), two oboes, English horn, two clarinets, bass clarinet, two bassoons (2nd doubling contrabassoon), four horns, two trumpets, three trombones, tuba, timpani, two percussionists, harp, piano (doubling celesta), and strings.

== Reception ==
Parada has been praised by music critics. Reviewing the world premiere, Fiona Maddocks of The Observer opined, "Parada, part of the Related Rocks festival, is an expansive, mainly slow (unusual for Lindberg) single movement. It opens with lush, dream-like massed strings, muted and using vibrato. Within this slow trajectory, moments of rapid action and clarity - brass explosions and woodwind ripples - unsettle the hazy stillness, dying away with simple cello pizzicatos. Lindberg achieves luminous orchestral effects, holding the sounds poised as if centrifugally. The Philharmonia, now well groomed in his style, made masterly work of its subtleties." Reviewing the United States premiere by the Los Angeles Philharmonic, Mark Swed of the Los Angeles Times wrote, "Magnus Lindberg's Parada begins with a slow parade of chords. They are somber but colorful. They move with solemn grace, like ghostly visions floating through a fog. And when you have resonant chords like these--complex and new, yet somehow familiar-sounding, cloaked in beautiful sonorities, awash in mystery--you have a pretty good sense that something special is about to follow in their wake." He added, "It is a weighty slow movement, with lots of fast things happening on the surface and distant hints of Sibelius." Anne Midgette of The Washington Post called it "an attractive braid of music created by winding two disparate ideas - a fast scherzo and the slow shimmer of strings - into a single whole, now full, now slender, set off with gleaming beads of percussion, tapering at the end to something gentle and warm." She added, "It took a big orchestra, including a full complement of percussion, but felt light."

However, reviewing a recording of the piece alongside other Lindberg works, the magazine Gramophone was somewhat critical of the piece, remarking, "Parada‚ the slowestmoving of these scores‚ is also the most frankly Sibelian‚ full of gestures and textures redolent of the inescapable Finnish master. While its ravishing invention is easy to enjoy‚ I wasn't sure how it was meant to hold together‚ so this may or may not be the place to start for the uninitiated."

== Recording ==
A commercial recording of Parada, performed by the Philharmonia Orchestra under Salonen, was released through Sony Classical Records in 2002. The album also features Lindberg's Cantigas, Cello Concerto No. 1, and Fresco.
