= Emperor Otto Prize =

German cultural award

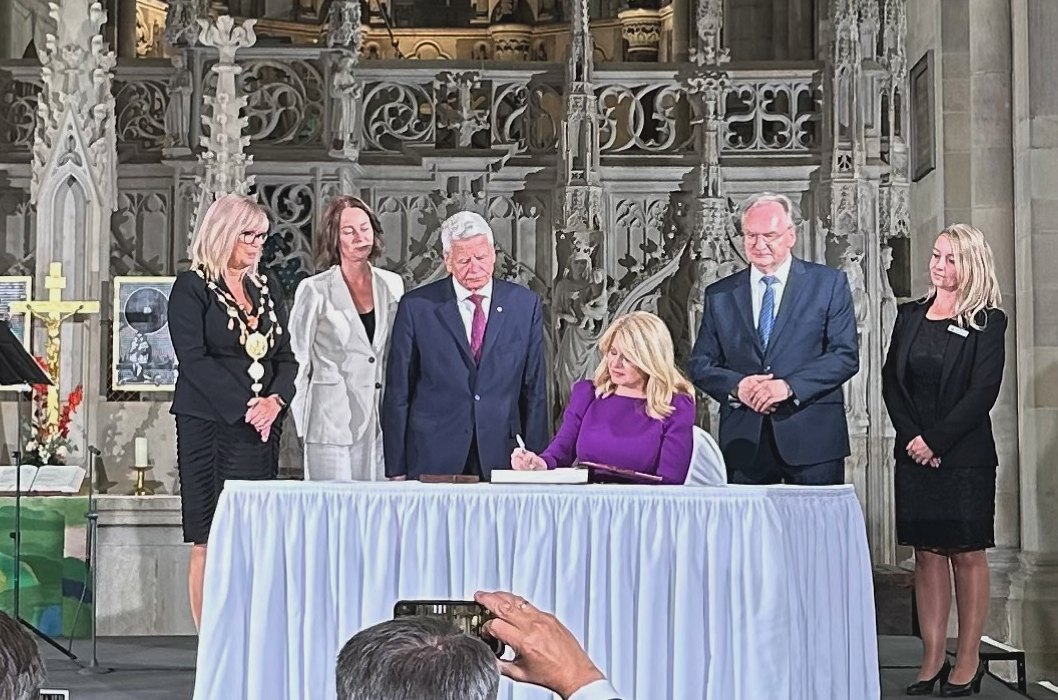
Zuzana Čaputová signing the Golden Book of Magdeburg at the Kaiser Otto Prize Ceremony 2023

The Emperor Otto Prize of the city of Magdeburg is awarded by the Emperor Otto Cultural Foundation to individuals "who have made significant contributions to the European unification process, particularly with regard to the Central, Eastern, and Southeastern European states." It was first awarded in 2005 on the occasion of the city's anniversary. It is awarded every two years. The name of the non-monetary award commemorates the merits of Otto the Great. The recipient of the prize receives a representative certificate and a bronze medal. The medal features a relief of the current awardee on the front side. The reverse side bears the inscription "Kaiser Otto Preis der Stadt Magdeburg." The medal is designed by the Halle sculptor Bernd Göbel. The award ceremony takes place in the Magdeburg Cathedral.

== Recipients ==
- 2005: Richard von Weizsäcker
- 2007: Vaira Vīķe-Freiberga
- 2009: Władysław Bartoszewski
- 2011: Angela Merkel
- 2013: Egon Bahr
- 2015: Organization for Security and Co-operation in Europe, Ivica Dačić
- 2017: Federica Mogherini
- 2020: Klaus Johannis
- 2023: Zuzana Čaputová
- 2025: Lisa Batiashvili, Igor Levit
