= Piano Concerto No. 1 (Lindberg) =

The Concerto for Piano and Orchestra is the first piano concerto by the Finnish composer Magnus Lindberg. The work was commissioned by the Helsinki Festival on 4 September 1991 and completed in 1994. It is dedicated to the pianist Paul Crossley.

== Composition ==
The concerto has a duration of approximately 24 minutes and is composed in three numbered movements played without pause. The composition is partially modeled after Maurice Ravel's Piano Concerto in G major.

=== Instrumentation ===
The work is scored for a solo piano and an orchestra consisting of two flutes (doubling piccolo), oboe, cor anglais, two clarinets, bass clarinet, two bassoons (doubling contrabassoon), two horns, trumpet, trombone, tuba, two percussionists, harp and strings.

== Reception ==
Anthony Holden of The Observer called it "a dynamic, multi-layered work in which piano and orchestra take turns leading each other a hectic dance." He wrote, "Part-modelled on Ravel's G major concerto, its subtle, restless harmonic shifts perfectly suit Lindberg's stated aim of reclaiming the piano as a lyrical rather than a percussive instrument; amid the blazing climax before its diminuendo ending, his mighty cadenza did indeed prove as 'wicked' as promised." Arnold Whittall of Gramophone opined, "At nearly 30 minutes, the concerto has its moments of routine, but these come earlier rather than later, and from the middle of the second movement the music builds an absorbing and exciting soundscape, broadening out in ways which announce one of Lindberg's most productive affinities – with his great Finnish precursor Sibelius." Andrew Clements of The Guardian contrasted the work to Lindberg's Kraft, observing, "Certainly the transparency of the Piano Concerto (1994), with its classically proportioned scoring, makes a sharp contrast, as the solo piano threads its way, Berio-like, through iridescent textures and crystalline instrumental lines."
