= Piano Concerto No. 2 (Lindberg) =

Piano composition by Magnus Lindberg

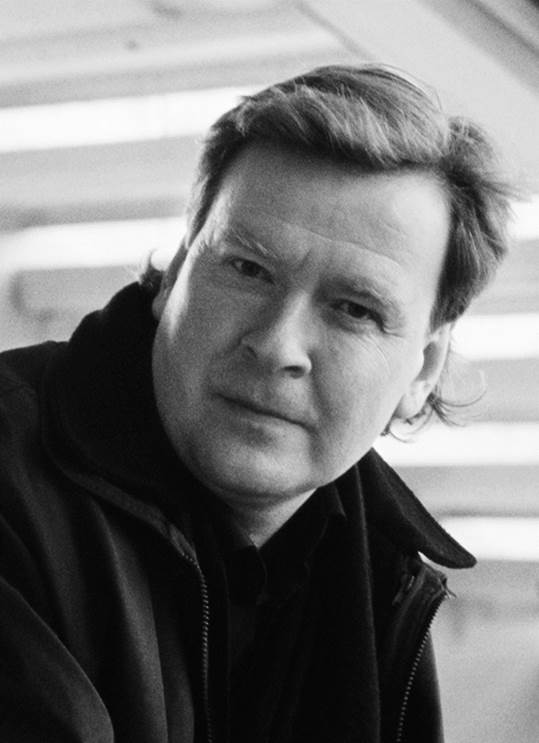
Magnus Lindberg in 2015

The Piano Concerto No. 2 is a composition for solo piano and orchestra by the Finnish composer Magnus Lindberg. The work was jointly commissioned by the Royal Concertgebouw Orchestra, the Gothenburg Symphony Orchestra, and the New York Philharmonic, for which Lindberg was then composer-in-residence. It was given its world premiere at Avery Fisher Hall on May 3, 2012, by the pianist Yefim Bronfman and the New York Philharmonic under the direction of Alan Gilbert.

== Composition ==
The piano concerto has a duration of roughly 30 minutes and is written in three connected sections. It was composed between 2011 and 2012, and was Lindberg's fourth and final commission for the New York Philharmonic as its composer-in-residence. Lindberg has cited Maurice Ravel's Piano Concerto for the Left Hand as inspiration for the piece.

=== Instrumentation ===
The work is composed for solo piano and a large orchestra comprising three flutes (3rd doubling piccolo), two oboes, cor anglais, three clarinets (3rd doubling E♭ clarinet), bass clarinet, two bassoons, contrabassoon, four horns, three trumpets (3rd doubling trumpet in D), three trombones, tuba, timpani, two percussionists, and strings.

== Reception ==
The concerto has received mixed praise from music critics. Reviewing the world premiere, Anthony Tommasini of The New York Times called it "a surging, mercurial 32-minute work" and wrote, "The concerto has great stylistic diversity: elusive atonal stretches; writing for the piano that evokes the spiky style of Stockhausen one moment and the voluptuous colors of Ravel the next; orchestral flourishes with the sweep of Rachmaninoff; episodes recalling Mr. Lindberg's earlier work in which he explored extremes of complexity." He added, "Yet for all the shifts in language and style, the concerto comes across as organic and inevitable. I kept waiting for this teaser of a piece to break out. It never really did, but I look forward to hearing it again." John Allison of The Daily Telegraph similarly described the concerto as "disappointingly conventional," but noted that "it still excitingly captures all the tussle inherent in the concerto form."

However, the work was highly praised by Georgia Rowe of the San Francisco Classical Voice, who said, "...it emerged a work of tremendous power and considerable allure." She continued:

You can hear echoes of Ravel (and Rachmaninov, and Gershwin) in the gorgeous orchestral harmonies, and in the piano's cascading lines. Yet there's a deeply mysterious aspect to the score, as well. This is music that invites the listener to reverie: Ravel glimpsed through a kind of dream-lens. Over its 30-minute length, the concerto yielded a mesmerizing study in contrasts: a work that looks back fondly to early 20th-century Romanticism, while contemplating a dark, unknowable future.
