= Violin Concerto No. 1 (Lindberg) =

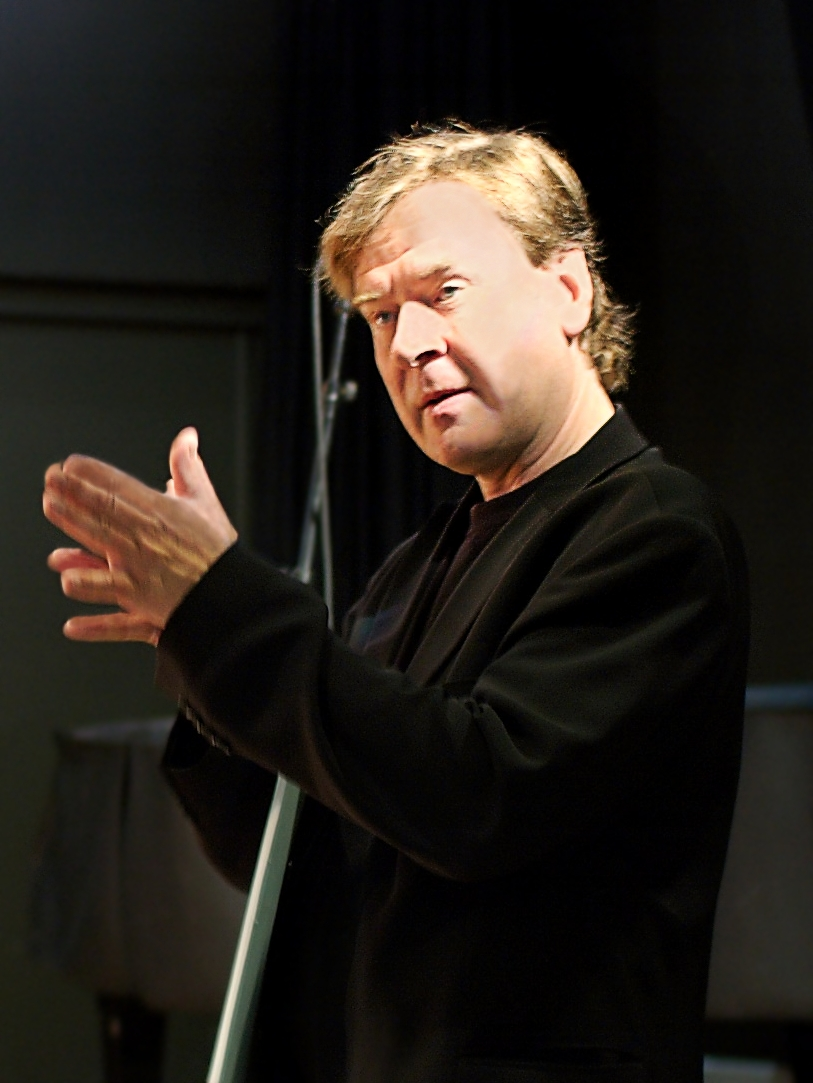
Magnus Lindberg in 2006

The Violin Concerto No. 1 is a composition for solo violin and orchestra by the Finnish composer Magnus Lindberg. The work was commissioned by the Mostly Mozart Festival and was composed in 2006. It was given its world premiere at Avery Fisher Hall on August 22, 2006, by the violinist Lisa Batiashvili and the Mostly Mozart Festival Orchestra under the direction of Louis Langrée.

== Composition ==
The violin concerto has a duration of roughly 27 minutes and is composed in three numbered movements.

=== Instrumentation ===
The work is scored for solo violin and a chamber orchestra comprising two oboes, two bassoons, two horns, and strings.

== Reception ==
The violin concerto has been praised by music critics. Reviewing the world premiere, Allan Kozinn of The New York Times observed:

In the opening pages, the solo violin line was surrounded and eventually engulfed by the orchestral strings, which created the clean, icy texture that became the spine of much of the 25-minute score. Eventually this texture became the backdrop for embellishments of all kinds, ranging from adventures in gamelan scales, to moves that sounded like lost visitors from the world of film soundtracks.

He continued, "The lengthy, riveting cadenza near the end of the work is full of beauty and surprise, and it samples the full gamut of violin technique, from pizzicato to sliding and trilling, to lush melodies in double stops. Ms. Batiashvili made the most of its showpiece qualities but also maintained its internal coherence."

Andrew Clements of The Guardian called it "one of the finest new concertos for the instrument in several decades" and wrote, "The richness and complexity of the textures that Lindberg generates from a modest, Mozartian orchestra continue to amaze..." David Fanning of Gramophone similarly remarked, "It manages to balance substance with style, and poetry with virtuosity, in ways that can almost stand comparison with Berg (the distant but clear model for a number of its textures)."
