= Horn Concerto No. 2 =

Horn Concerto No. 2 may refer to:

- Horn Concerto No. 2 (Mozart)
- Horn Concerto No. 2 (Strauss)
