= Expo (Magnus Lindberg) =

Orchestral composition by Magnus Lindberg

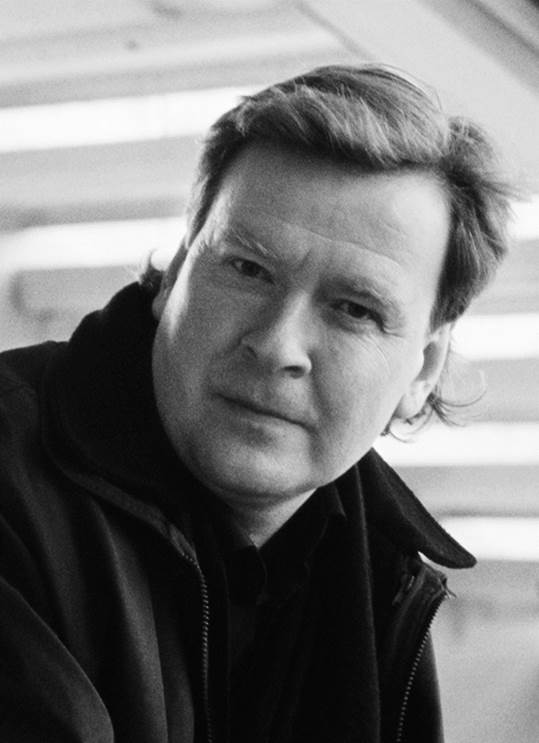
Magnus Lindberg in 2015

EXPO is an orchestral composition by the Finnish composer Magnus Lindberg. It was the first work commissioned by the New York Philharmonic under the conductor Alan Gilbert, and was Lindberg's first commission as the orchestra's composer-in-residence. The piece was first performed on September 16, 2009, at Avery Fisher Hall, New York City, during Alan Gilbert's inaugural concert with the New York Philharmonic. EXPO was the first newly commissioned work to open the New York Philharmonic's concert season since the premiere of Aaron Copland's Connotations under Leonard Bernstein on September 23, 1962.

== Composition ==
EXPO has a duration of roughly 10 minutes and is composed in a single movement.

=== Instrumentation ===
The work is scored for a large orchestra comprising two flutes, piccolo, two oboes, cor anglais, two clarinets, bass clarinet, two bassoons, contrabassoon, four horns, three trumpets, three trombones, tuba, timpani, two percussionists, harp, and strings.

== Reception ==
Reviewing the world premiere, Anthony Tommasini of The New York Times called it "an urgent, inventive 10-minute piece" and wrote, "as Mr. Lindberg, a pragmatic composer, surely realized, this occasion did not warrant a gnarly, intimidating modern piece. Not that 'EXPO' was some easygoing crowd pleaser. It is an intense, complex and elusive piece, yet somehow celebratory." Jeff Dunn of the San Francisco Classical Voice called it "a terrific curtain raiser, 10 minutes of alternating string whooshes (reminiscent of Lindberg's Finnish countrymen Sibelius and Rautavaara) and brass chorales."" David Patrick Stearns of The Philadelphia Inquirer similarly observed, "Part fanfare, part concerto for orchestra, Expo is an aerobic workout for all sections of the orchestra and [...] an exhilarating showcase. Though far from Lindberg's best work, Expo is a fine curtain-raiser. And if ever you felt lost in the high-traffic orchestration, you could at least glom onto the near-quotations of Britten's Peter Grimes in the brass writing."
