= Ashley Wass =

British pianist (born 1977)

Ashley Wass (born 26 March 1977) is a British classical pianist.

He was winner of the London International Piano Competition in 1997, a prizewinner at the Leeds Piano Competition in 2000, and a BBC Radio 3 New Generation Artist.

== Biography ==
Wass was born on 26 March 1977 in Lincolnshire, England. He studied at Chetham's School of Music and the Royal Academy of Music graduating in 2001.

Wass has performed at many of the world's finest concert halls including Wigmore Hall, Carnegie Hall, and the Vienna Konzerthaus. He has performed as a soloist with numerous leading ensembles, including all of the BBC orchestras, the Philharmonia, Orchestre National de Lille, Vienna Chamber Orchestra, Hong Kong Philharmonic, RLPO, and under the baton of conductors such as Simon Rattle, Osmo Vanska, Donald Runnicles, Ilan Volkov and Vassily Sinaisky.

In June 2002, Wass appeared alongside Sir Thomas Allen, Mstislav Rostropovich and Angela Gheorghiu in a gala concert at Buckingham Palace to mark the Golden Jubilee of Queen Elizabeth II, a performance that was broadcast live to millions of viewers around the world. In recent years Wass has become a regular guest at the BBC Proms, making his debut in 2008 with Vaughan Williams’ Piano Concerto, and returning in following seasons to perform works by Foulds, Stravinsky, Antheil, and McCabe.

Wass has also partnered with many of the leading artists of his generation, including Mitsuko Uchida, Steven Isserlis, Emmanuel Pahud, Richard Goode and members of the Guarneri Quartet and Beaux Arts Trio.

Ashley Wass is currently the Artistic Director of the Lincolnshire International Chamber Music Festival. He was Professor of Piano at the Royal College of Music from 2008 to 2018, and then Deputy Head of Keyboard Studies at the Royal Northern College of Music in Manchester. Wass is an Associate of the Royal Academy of Music. He was Director of Music at the Yehudi Menuhin School from April 2020 to July 2025.

== Discography ==
Wass made his first recording in 1999 for Naxos featuring works by César Franck. He is also known for his interpretations of composers such as Liszt, Beethoven and Bridge. Wass's survey of Bax’s piano music was nominated for a Gramophone Award and his discography boasts a number of Gramophone ‘Editor’s Choice’ recordings and BBC Music Magazine ‘Choices’.
