= Cello Concerto No. 1 (Lindberg) =

1999 composition for solo cello and orchestra by Magnus Lindberg

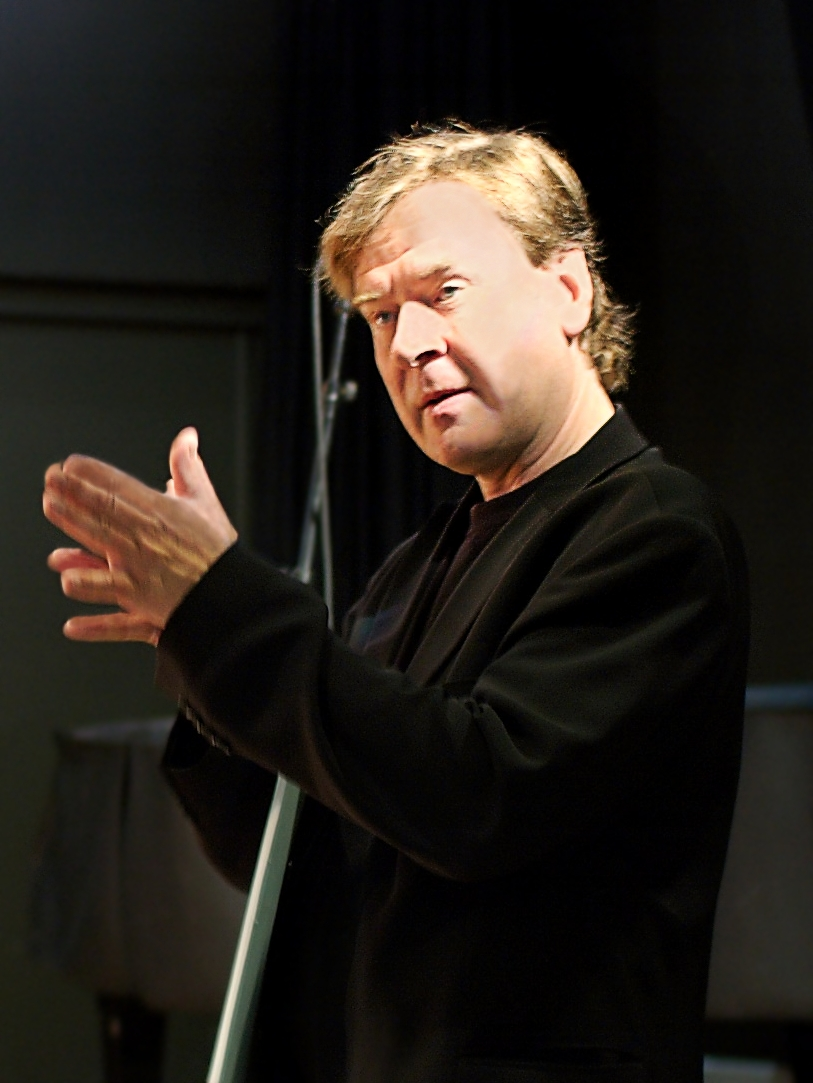
Magnus Lindberg in 2006

The Cello Concerto No. 1 is a composition for solo cello and orchestra by the Finnish composer Magnus Lindberg. It was first performed in the Cité de la Musique, Paris on May 6, 1999 by the cellist Anssi Karttunen and the Orchestre de Paris under the direction of Esa-Pekka Salonen.

== Composition ==
The cello concerto was composed between 1997 and 1999, though Magnus later revised the work in 2001. The work is composed in one continuous movement and has a duration of roughly 25 minutes.

=== Instrumentation ===
The work is scored for a solo cello and an orchestra comprising two flutes (2nd doubling piccolo) two oboes, English horn, two clarinets, bass clarinet, two bassoons (2nd doubling contrabassoon), two horns, two trumpets, two trombones, tuba, timpani, percussion, harp, celesta, and strings.

== Reception ==
The concerto has been praised by music critics. Reviewing a 2002 recording of the work, BBC Music Magazine described the music as "another radical solution to the age-old challenges thrown up by this particular genre." Gramophone compared the work favorably to Lindberg's Parada, writing:

If the Cello Concerto makes more sense‚ that isn’t because its idiom is less advanced (rather the reverse is true) but because there is a central protagonist whose progress we can follow. And Lindberg provides Anssi Karttunen with some fantastical technical challenges along the way. One could not describe the results as emotionally compelling. Rather‚ they constitute an unmissable show.

The musicologist Arnold Whittall similarly described it as "one of the best contemporary music releases of that year."

== Recording ==
A recording of the Cello Concerto, performed by Karttunen the Philharmonia Orchestra under Salonen, was released through Sony Classical Records in 2002. The album also features Lindberg's Cantigas, Parada, and Fresco.
