= Magnus Lindberg =

Finnish composer and pianist

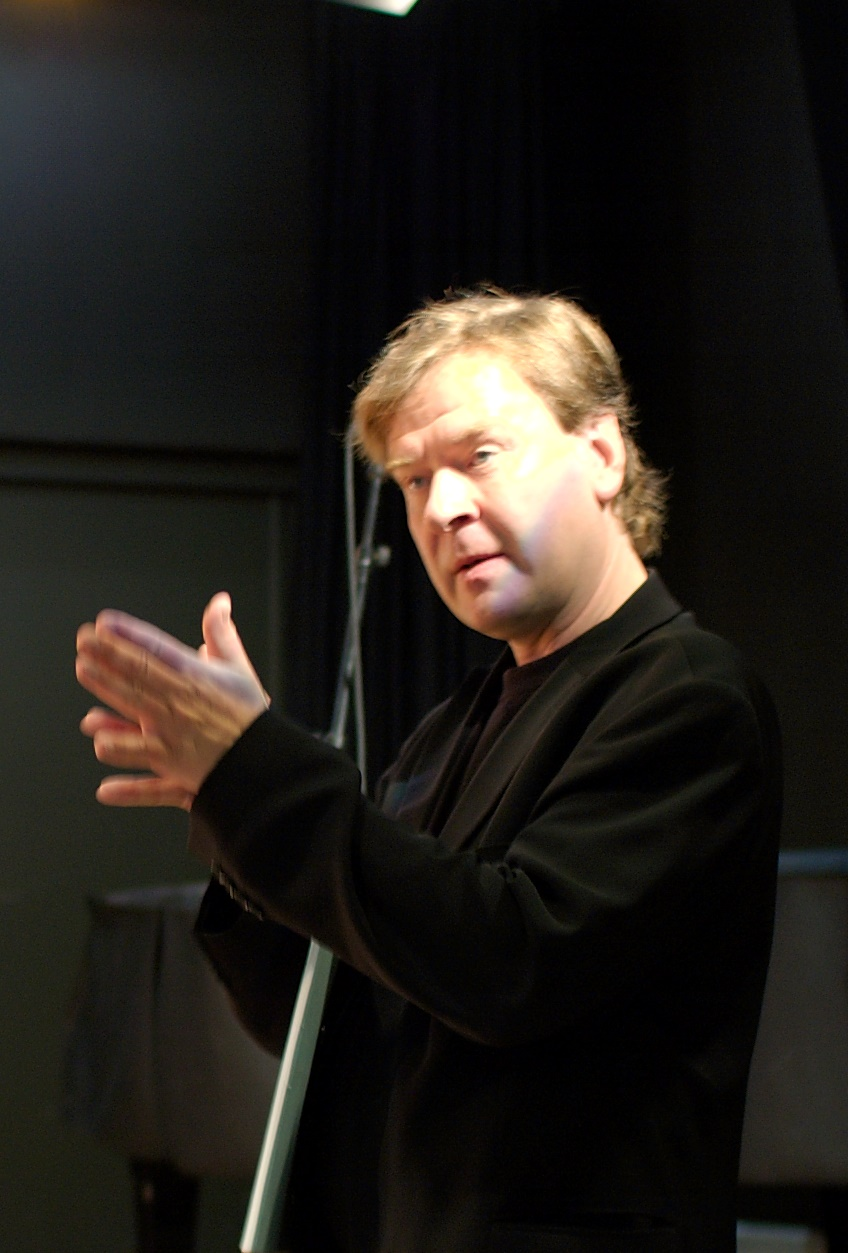
Magnus Lindberg

Magnus Gustaf Adolf Lindberg (born 27 June 1958) is a Finnish composer and pianist. He was the New York Philharmonic's composer-in-residence from 2009 to 2012 and the London Philharmonic Orchestra's composer-in-residence from 2014 to 2017.

== Early life ==
Lindberg was born in Helsinki, where he studied at the Sibelius Academy under Einojuhani Rautavaara and Paavo Heininen, beginning with piano. He attended summer courses in Siena (with Franco Donatoni) and Darmstadt (with Brian Ferneyhough). After graduating in 1981, he traveled widely in Europe, attending private studies with Vinko Globokar and Gérard Grisey in Paris, and observing Japanese drumming and punk rock in Berlin.

== Compositions and style ==
Lindberg's juvenilia include the large orchestral work Donor, composed at age 16. Quintetto dell’Estate (1979) is generally held to be Lindberg's first opus. His first piece performed by a professional orchestra was Sculpture II in 1982, the second part of a trilogy whose first and third sections were long unwritten. His first great success came with "Action-Situation-Signification" (1982), the first work in which he explored musique concrète. This piece was written for and premiered by the new-music ensemble Toimii ("It Works" in Finnish), which Lindberg founded in the summer of 1980. Around the same period, Lindberg founded an informal grouping known as the Ears Open Society including Lindberg and his contemporaries Eero Hämeenniemi, Jouni Kaipainen, Kaija Saariaho, Esa-Pekka Salonen and Herman Rechberger. He is a trained pianist and has performed several of his works as part of Toimii.

Kraft (1983–85), another piece written for Toimii, is Lindberg's largest work to date, with harmonies of over 70 notes and a meter-high score. It uses traditional instrumentation as well as percussion on scrap metal and spoken word. After finishing it Lindberg found it hard to compose, and with the exception of 1986's Ur, which he called "Kraft in chamber form", he entered a creative hiatus that lasted over two years. During this time he was not only rethinking his style but also recovering from a tropical disease contracted during travel in Indonesia.

Kraft made use of a chaconne-type structure where the progression of the piece is based on a repeated chain of chords. It was this idea that served as the basis for Lindberg's next style. He returned with an orchestral trilogy consisting of Kinetics (1988), Marea (1989–90), and Joy (1990). Though Lindberg became less interested in electronic manipulation of sound, he continued to explore the possibilities of compositional software, and Engine displays complex computer-generated counterpoint. Since Joy, Lindberg has gradually refined his style, orchestrations and harmonies. This showed itself first in Corrente for chamber ensemble (1992) and its subsequent orchestral version, Corrente II, and in Duo Concertante (1992). In these works Lindberg showed influences ranging from Pierre Boulez and Tristan Murail to Igor Stravinsky and minimalism. His symphonic work Aura (1994) reflects a newer, more eclectic style.

Lindberg has since built upon these developments, further refining his style, which now leans toward a type of new tonality hinted at in works such as Joy and Aura. This development has culminated in one of his most popular scores to date, his Clarinet Concerto (2002), which has a folk-like melody and rich orchestration. His recent work, Two Episodes, was premiered at the BBC Proms on 24 July 2016. It is a companion piece to Beethoven's Ninth Symphony, containing allusions to both the symphony and other works by the composer, rather in the same way that I.M. Pei's Louvre Pyramid complements the Tuileries Palace in Paris.

== Awards and honors ==
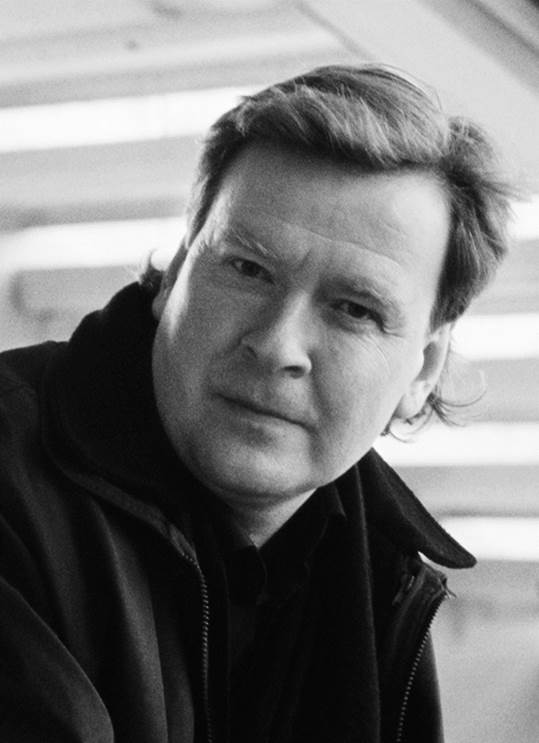
Lindberg in 2015

Lindberg has received a number of composition prizes, including the Prix Italia (1986), the UNESCO International Rostrum of Composers (1986), the Nordic Council Music Prize (1988) for Kraft, and the Royal Philharmonic Society Prize for large-scale composition (1992).

Lindberg became the new composer-in-residence at the New York Philharmonic for the 2009–2010 season at the invitation of the incoming music director Alan Gilbert. The Philharmonic's September 2009 opening night gala, which was Gilbert's debut as music director, featured a well-received new work by Lindberg, EXPO. Lindberg's fourth and final commission as composer-in-residence was the Piano Concerto No. 2, which was premiered on 3 May 2012.

== Works ==
=== Orchestral ===
- Sculpture II (1981)
- Kraft for small solo ensemble and orchestra (1983–85)
- Kinetics (1988–89)
- Marea (1989–90)
- Corrente II (1992)
- Aura (In memoriam Witold Lutosławski) (1994)
- Arena (1995)
- Feria (1997)
- Cantigas (1998–99)
- Fresco (1997)
- Parada (2001)
- Bright Cecilia: Variations on a Theme by Purcell (2002)
- Chorale (2002)
- Concerto for Orchestra (2003)
- Tribute (2004)
- Sculpture (2005)
- Seht die Sonne (2007)
- EXPO (2009)
- Al largo (2010)
- Era (2013)
- Vivo (2015)
- Two Episodes (2016)
- Tempus fugit (2016–17)
- Agile (2017–18)
- Absence (2020)
- Encore (2021)
- Serenades (2023)

=== Chamber orchestra or ensemble ===
- Ritratto (1979–83)
- Tendenza (1982)
- Joy (1989–90)
- Corrente (1992)
- Coyote Blues (1996)
- Engine (1996)
- Corrente – China Version (2000)
- Bubo bubo (2002)
- Jubilees (2002)
- Counter Phrases (2002–03)
- Souvenir (2010)
- Red House (2013)
- Aventures (2013)
- Shadow of the Future (2019)

=== Soloist(s) and orchestra ===
- Away for solo clarinet, string orchestra, piano and percussion (1994)
- Piano Concerto No. 1 (1991/94)
- Campana In Aria for horn and orchestra (1998)
- Cello Concerto No. 1 (1999)
- Clarinet Concerto (2002)
- Violin Concerto No. 1 (2006)
- Piano Concerto No. 2 (2011–12)
- Cello Concerto No. 2 (2013)
- Violin Concerto No. 2 (2015)
- Piano Concerto No. 3 (2022)
- Viola Concerto (2023–24)

=== Wind orchestra ===
- Zungenstimmen for wind orchestra (1994)
- Gran Duo for wind orchestra (1999–2000)
- Ottoni for brass ensemble (2005)

=== Small ensemble ===
- Musik för två pianon (Music for Two Pianos) (1976)
- Arabesques for flute, oboe, clarinet, bassoon, and horn (1978)
- Play I for two pianos (1979)
- Quintetto dell' estate for flute, clarinet, violin, cello and piano (1979)
- Linea d'ombra for small ensemble (1981)
- "...de Tartuffe, je crois..." for piano quintet (1981)
- Action-Situation-Signification for small ensemble and electronics (1982)
- Ablauf for clarinet and percussion (1983)
- Zona for cello solo and seven instruments (1983)
- Metal Work for accordion and percussion (1984)
- UR for small ensemble (1986)
- Moto for cello and piano (1990)
- Steamboat Bill Jr. for clarinet and cello (1990)
- Clarinet Quintet (1992)
- Duo Concertante for solo clarinet, solo cello and ensemble (1992)
- Decorrente for small ensemble (1992)
- Kiri for clarinet, cello, percussion and electronics (1993)
- Related Rocks for two pianos, percussion and electronics (1997)
- Dos Coyotes for cello and piano (2002)
- Konzertstück for cello and piano (2006)
- Trio for clarinet, cello and piano (2008) (also arranged for violin, cello and piano (2011–12))
- Acequia Madre for clarinet and piano (2012) (also arranged for viola and piano)
- Maguey de tlalcoyote for string trio (2018) (also arranged for double string trio (2021))
- Deux Études pour trois clarinettes for three clarinets (2020)
- Quintet for piano, oboe, clarinet, horn, and bassoon (2023)
- Voie for cello and organ (2025)

=== Solo instrument ===
- Klavierstück for piano (1977)
- Tre Pianostycke (Three Piano Pieces, or Three Short Pieces) for piano (1978)
- Ground for harpsichord (1983)
- Stroke for cello (1984)
- Twine for solo piano (1988)
- Jeux d'anches for solo accordion (1990)
- Jubilees for piano (2000)
- Partia for cello solo (2001)
- Etude I for piano (2001)
- Mano a mano for guitar (2004)
- Etude II for piano (2004)
- Duello for cello (2010)
- Fanfar för Victoria for trumpet (2015)
- Fratello for piano (2016)
- Promenade for piano (2017)
- Caprice for violin (2022)

=== Vocal ===
- Jag vill breda vingar ut for mezzo-soprano and piano (1977–78)
- Untitled for chamber chorus a cappella (1978)
- Songs from North and South for children's chorus a cappella (1993–2008)
- Graffiti for chamber chorus and orchestra (2008–09)
- Accused for soprano and orchestra (2014)
- Triumf att finnas till (Triumph to Exist) for chorus and orchestra (2018)
- Like As The Waves for soprano and violin (2021)
