= List of compositions by Bill McGlaughlin =

Conductor and radio commentator Bill McGlaughlin began composing in 1997, whereupon he left his conducting position at the Kansas City Symphony and moved to New York City to concentrate on composing. The outcome of the move was a flurry of creativity, and he composed successfully, although more intermittently, since then. Well over half of his works were commissioned. In 1998 McGlaughlin signed a contract with Subito Music, which thenceforth published all of his work.

== Selected major works; musical style ==
McGlaughlin's first major work was Three Dreams and a Question: Choral Songs on e.e. cummings, prompted by the death of a friend — which he debuted with the Kansas City Symphony on April 28, 1998, to an enthusiastic audience and press. It was quickly followed by five more premieres within a ten-month span.

For a millennial celebration, McGlaughlin was chosen from a field of 350 composers to write a major new work for Continental Harmony, a nationwide cultural initiative commissioned by the National Endowment for the Arts and the American Composers Forum. The composition, Walt Whitman's Dream, premiered in July 2000, and celebrated the new millennium with a combined chorus of nearly 800 singers from around the world, accompanied by orchestra.

On December 15, 2005, the national two-hour daily NPR classical music radio program Performance Today announced that out of all of the music aired that week, McGlaughlin's new commissioned composition Remembering Icarus garnered the most, and the most heartfelt, listener response.

McGlaughlin described his compositional style as more intuitive than intellectual, and says that he does not shun tonality: "I think when composers turn completely away from tonality, they lose a big part of storytelling." Some of his work incorporates or references elements of jazz — for instance Bela's Bounce, an homage to Béla Bartók and Charlie Parker.

McGlaughlin characterized his creative process as both studied and extemporaneous, experimenting with various methods to elicit the elusive "moment of inspiration." His compositional ideas often sprang from external sources, either literary, personal, or musical, or from inspired tangents on commissioned requests. His muse-seeking practices included walking in nature, running, meditating, and staying up all night at the keyboard. McGlaughlin's advice to young composers was never to shrug off an idea, even if at first it seems insignificant or similar to an existing work: "Write it down and throw it out later if you have to, but don't avoid the impulse."

== Compositions ==
=== 1990s ===
- Solstice: Fantasy on Old English Carols (premiere December 10, 1997 – Kansas City Symphony). Orchestra. Christmas piece.
- Crooked Timber (premiere January 23, 1998 – Kansas City Symphony). Orchestra. A celebration of the irregular, based on Immanuel Kant's words, "Out of timber so crooked, as that from which man is made, nothing entirely straight can be built."
- Three Dreams and a Question: Choral Songs on e.e. cummings (premiere April 28, 1998 – Kansas City Symphony). Chorus and orchestra. Written in memory of composer and pianist Kevin Oldham.
- Aaron's Horizons (premiere June 18, 1998 – Saint Paul Chamber Orchestra). Chamber orchestra. A tribute to composer Aaron Copland, with whom McGlaughlin worked in the 1970s. Heard nationwide in a broadcast performed by the Saint Paul Chamber Orchestra.
- Three Mile Table (premiere July 18, 1998 – Music at Gretna festival; commissioned). Sextet of flute, oboe, violin, cello, guitar, and piano. In honor of the recently completed, 11-mile-long Vasco da Gama Bridge, the longest bridge in Europe, in Lisbon, Portugal. The title refers to a table constructed and placed on the bridge to celebrate its opening. The piece utilizes Portuguese folk melodies in a whimsical and buoyant way.
- Bela's Bounce (premiere October 4, 1998 – Camerata Orchestra of Bloomington, Indiana; commissioned). Orchestra. An homage to Béla Bartók and Charlie Parker.

=== 2000–2003 ===
- Walt Whitman's Dream (premiere July 15, 2000 – International Choral Festival, in Missoula, Montana; commissioned). Chorus and orchestra. Commissioned by a national program called Continental Harmony — a Millennium Celebration sponsored by the National Endowment for the Arts and the American Composers Forum. The premiere of Walt Whitman's Dream celebrated the new millennium with a combined chorus of nearly 800 singers from around the world, accompanied by the Missoula Symphony. McGlaughlin explained that his composition "... would allow the audience to feel the power of the human voice to bridge over language and culture." The text is from Walt Whitman's Leaves of Grass.
- Aunt Eva Suite (Surveying Lake Wobegon) (premiere September 3, 2000 – Ravinia Festival). Narrator and orchestra or chamber ensemble. Narration written by Garrison Keillor.
- Carol Antiqua (premiere December 23, 2000 – A Prairie Home Companion, from Town Hall, New York). Ensemble of neglected instruments. Christmas piece.
- Angelus (premiere March 17, 2002 – Civic Orchestra of Minneapolis; commissioned). Orchestra. A 9/11 remembrance. Composed in celebration of the 50th Anniversary of the Minneapolis Civic Orchestra.
- Three Pieces for Wind Trio, also known as Three Sketches for Three Winds (premiere June 1, 2002 – Kemper Museum in Kansas City, Missouri). Flute, oboe, bassoon.
- Echoes (premiere summer 2003 – The Chamber Music Conference and Composers' Forum of the East, in Bennington, Vermont; commissioned). Horn trio.
- Three by Six (premiere summer 2003 – The Chamber Music Conference and Composers' Forum of the East, in Bennington, Vermont; commissioned). Chamber ensemble.
- Theme to Exploring Music (premiere October 3, 2003 – Exploring Music)
- The Bells of St. Ferdinand (premiere October 2003 – Tucson Symphony Orchestra; commissioned). Orchestra. Orchestral variations, in celebration of Tucson Symphony's 75th anniversary.

=== 2004–present ===
- Remembering Icarus (premiere October 2005 – Las Cruces Symphony, Las Cruces, New Mexico; commissioned). Orchestra. Honors local radio pioneer Ralph Willis Goddard, who was electrocuted in 1929 while checking a radio transmitter during a thunderstorm. Las Cruces public radio station KRWG, which commissioned the piece, uses his initials as its call letters. Remembering Icarus was subsequently aired nationally on NPR's Performance Today on December 9, 2005, and has been re-broadcast on radio three times.
- Bagatelles: 1. Antique Dance with Ground Round 2. Fast and Loose (premiere February 22, 2008 – Washington Saxophone Quartet, at Wolf Trap; commissioned). Saxophone quartet. Co-commissioned by Wolf Trap and the Washington Saxophone Quartet.
- The Heart's Light: An Essay for Orchestra (premiere March 30, 2008 – Temple University Symphony Orchestra; commissioned). Orchestra. Also performed at Carnegie Hall on April 2, 2008.
- Old American Songs for G.K. (premiere May 13, 2008 – Boston Pops with Garrison Keillor, Symphony Hall, Boston; commissioned). Orchestra.
- Brave New World (premiere September 29, 2012 – Las Cruces Symphony, commissioned). Orchestral instruments plus harp, piano, and marimba. In honor of the 100th anniversary of New Mexico's becoming a state in 1912.

== Composer-in-residence engagements ==
McGlaughlin had three composer-in-residence engagements. They were as follows:

- Music at Gretna (1998)
- International Choral Festival, Missoula, Montana (2000) — Continental Harmony commission for Millennial Celebration
- The Chamber Music Conference and Composers' Forum of the East, Bennington College, Bennington, Vermont (2003)

== See also ==
- Exploring Music
