= Steve Robinson (executive) =

Steve Robinson (born September 7, 1946) is an American radio manager, producer and executive producer. He has held senior management positions with numerous American radio stations, including WFMT and the WFMT Radio Network/Chicago, WCRB/Boston, and public radio outlets WBUR/Boston, WGBH/Boston, KPFA/Berkeley, WBGO/Newark, Vermont Public Radio and Nebraska Public Radio Network. Robinson served as general manager of the statewide Nebraska Public Radio Network (1990–2000) and WFMT and the WFMT Radio Network from 2000 until October 2016.

A 50-year radio veteran, he has produced programs ranging from classical music documentaries to public affairs programs and has directed over 100 on-air pledge drives.

== Personal life and career ==
He was born in Boston in 1946. He completed graduation from Boston University in 1969 with a degree in music education. Robinson started his professional career in 1967 at WBUR/Boston while still an undergraduate at Boston University. At WBUR, he produced and hosted six two-hour classical music programs per week. He also created and co-hosted a Saturday morning live call-in program about high fidelity called Shop Talk which ran from 1968 to 1978.

After WBUR, Robinson held positions at WGBH and WCRB/Boston and KPFA/Berkeley. In 1976 he was appointed the first development director of Vermont Public Radio (VPR). At VPR, he won a national award from the Corporation for Public Broadcasting (CPB) for "The Sky Report with Professor Delo Mook", a five-minute daily program about astrophysics that was syndicated throughout the U.S. CPB cited the program for "innovative idea and superb execution." In 1980, he became the first development director for the newly created Jazz station, WBGO/Jazz88 in Newark. At WBGO, Robinson helped establish the station as one of the most important Jazz stations in the U.S.

In 1971, Robinson met multi-reed instrumentalist, Rahsaan Roland Kirk, and worked with him on several projects, including Radio Free Rahsaan, an eight-part series of one-hour radio programs. After Mr. Kirk's untimely passing in 1977, he produced Memories of Rahsaan, a series of 30-minute programs that became part of Radio Free Rahsaan.

In 1984, he co-founded AIR, the Association of Independents in Radio, a service organization to assist independent radio producers in the United States. Robinson wrote AIR's first two successful grants from the New York State Council on the Arts and the National Endowment for the Arts.

In 1990, Robinson became the general manager of the newly formed Nebraska Public Radio Network (NPRN), a nine-station system of transmitters throughout the state that reached over one million listeners.

Throughout his career, Robinson has produced dozens of radio programs that have been heard throughout the world, including live broadcasts from Salzburg, Austria (on the occasion of Mozart's 250th birthday); Durbin, South Africa (for the world premiere for the opera, "Princess Magogo); Quebec City, Canada (for a live broadcast of Mahler's Symphony of a Thousand with 1000 performers); Jerusalem, Israel (for a broadcast from the Jerusalem International Chamber Music Festival); and has produced numerous live broadcasts from Chicago and throughout the U.S.

He has worked with William Schuman, Elliott Carter, Charles Dodge, Roger Reynolds, Alan Hovhaness and other composers on programs about their music. In 2003, he created the daily classical music appreciation radio program, Exploring Music with Bill McGlaughlin. The series is carried by state networks throughout the world including Australia and China. At the WFMT Radio Network he created the first classical music radio exchange between the United States and China.

== WFMT and the WFMT Radio Network ==
In 2000, Robinson became the general manager of WFMT and the WFMT Radio Network. Founded in 1951, WFMT is considered as one of the most admired classical music stations in the U.S. and under his leadership many new programs were added to the local schedule, including Introductions, Impromptu and others. Robinson worked on diversifying the programs of WFMT by expanding the amount of live broadcasting from the station.

One of his most important initiatives at the WFMT Radio Network was the creation of Exploring Music with Bill McGlaughlin, in 2003. This daily, one-hour music appreciation program is heard on over 60 U.S. stations and has a weekly audience of over 400,000 unique listeners. The program is also heard in Australia, Guam, the Philippines and in Beijing. Initial funding for Exploring Music was provided by the National Endowment for the Arts with additional funding from individuals and foundations.

The station under his leadership focused on live music by broadcasting a wide array of local Chicago groups and ensembles. In 2007, the Chicago Tribune named him "Chicagoan of the Year" in the arts.

In 2015, he executed a cross-cultural broadcast relationship between America and China by exporting to China for the first time broadcasting concerts by the NY Philharmonic, LA Philharmonic, San Francisco Symphony, Dallas Symphony, Chamber Music Society of Lincoln Center and Carnegie Hall. He also arranged for concerts from the Shanghai Spring International Music Festival and the Shanghai Symphony Orchestra to be exported to the West with broadcasts in the U.S., Canada and Europe.

In 2022, Robinson launched a YouTube channel for his series, The Architects of Music with Lawrence Rapchak.

== Other work ==
In 2004 and again in 2010, Robinson created and produced two, live, 17-hour fundraising campaigns involving all Chicago radio and TV stations to aid victims of the tsunami in southeast and the earthquake in Haiti. Each campaign raised over $3 million. Robinson received two Wesbury Award from the American Red Cross of Greater Chicago for the fundraising campaigns.

In 2008, Robinson and Bill McGlaughlin received the Dushkin Award for Exploring Music with Bill McGlaughlin from the Music Institute of Chicago. He has received local and national awards for his work in Chicago, including the Champion Award from the Merit School of Music, the ASCAP/Deems Taylor Award for creative programming and others.
