= Don Tait =

American radio host and producer (1941–2023)

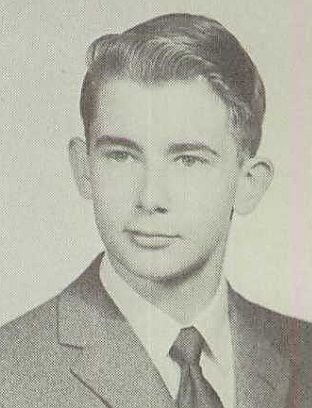
- Tait in 1959
- Born: July 31, 1941
- Died: December 2023 (aged 82)
- Occupations: Radio host; producer
- Years active: 1965–2007
- Known for: WFMT

Donald H. Tait (July 31, 1941 – December 2023), was an American classical music radio host and producer. From 1972 until his retirement in 2007, he was a program host for WFMT in Chicago.

== Biography ==
=== Early life ===
Tait spent his childhood in Evanston, Illinois, where he developed his lifelong interest in classical music and collecting recordings. In 1965, he was hired for his first job in broadcasting by the Chicago radio station WNIB, which played classical music at the time.

=== At WFMT ===
Another classical music station, WFMT, hired Tait in June 1972. He succeeded Marty Robinson, who had left to work at a local PBS affiliate. At WFMT, Tait established and hosted the programs Chicago Symphony Retrospective and Collector's Item. For the latter program, he often played discs from his personal collection of 30,000 78 RPM recordings. A colleague later recalled that Tait accumulated so many recordings that "he bought a house and had to have the floors reinforced to accommodate the weight of his collection". In a 1981 editorial commemorating WFMT's 30th anniversary, the art critic for the Chicago Tribune, Alan G. Artner, said of Tait's work:

In my hearing, no one has presented artists of the past as informatively, not only week-by-week, but in comprehensive surveys. One cannot easily forget the undertakings on behalf of Serge Koussevitzky, Pierre Monteux, and Leopold Stokowski. Who else would have attempted to play every one of Stokowski's 700 recordings? What's more, what station would have allotted the time?

In a 1991 interview, Tait said that he modeled himself on a radio host from his youth who "treated his listeners like intelligent people and never tried to browbeat them". Tait applied that principle to his own work, calling it the "golden rule of broadcasting: treat people the way you'd like to be treated".

Crises at WFMT emerged in the late 1980s and early 1990s when its parent company, Chicago Educational Television Association, began implementing drastic changes to the station's programming. John von Rhein, the classical music critic for the Chicago Tribune, said that the alterations resulted in alienating "faithful listeners who didn't want to see classical music held hostage to the pursuit of increased ratings and profitability". He praised Tait as being one of the hosts who continued to "enforce dignity and style on the morning and afternoon airwaves" during this period. By 1991, Collector's Item was on an "extended hiatus", but continued to be heard internationally in syndication. In 1996, WFMT's program director, Norman Pellegrini, was forced out of the station, a move that von Rhein said two years later had resulted in a "perceptible lowering of standards", with only Tait remaining as one of the last three "old-guard, voice-of-God program hosts". A further report from 2003 decried the continuing decline of WFMT and called Tait "underemployed".

Tait retired from WFMT in October 2007.

=== As producer ===
In addition to his duties as host, Tait produced radio documentaries, including From Stock to Solti, about the history of the Chicago Symphony Orchestra. He was also on the panel that selected recordings for inclusion in the orchestra's CD set of archival recordings, Chicago Symphony Orchestra in the Twentieth Century: Collector's Choice.

=== Death ===
Tait died in December 2023.
