= A. B. Spellman =

American poet, music critic, and arts administrator (born 1935)

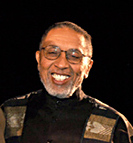
- Born: Alfred Bennett Spellman; August 12, 1935 (age 91); Nixonton, North Carolina, US
- Education: Howard University
- Occupations: Poet; jazz critic; arts administrator
- Spouses: Danielle Ryvlin Spellman; Karen Edmonds Spellman (m. 1969)
- Writing career
- Period: 1965–present
- Genres: Poetry; music criticism
- Notable work: Four Lives in the Bebop Business (1966)
- Literary movement: Black Arts Movement

Alfred Bennett Spellman (born August 1935) is a poet, music critic, and arts administrator. Considered a part of the Black Arts Movement, he first received attention for his book of poems entitled The Beautiful Days (1965). In 1966, he published a book on the then recent history of jazz entitled Four Lives in the Bebop Business (aka Black Music: Four Lives; Random House). From 1975 to 2005, he worked as an arts administrator for the National Endowment for the Arts. He has been instrumental in supporting jazz in the United States. A recording of his creative collaboration with Jeff Scott and the Imani Winds, titled Passion for Bach and Coltrane and featuring Spellman's narration, won the 2024 Grammy Award for Best Classical Compendium.

== Biography ==
Born August 12, 1935, in Nixonton, North Carolina, Spellman, the son of two teachers, attended P.W. Moore High School in Elizabeth City, North Carolina, where he was a member of the basketball team, glee club and oratorical club. After graduating in 1953, he entered Howard University, where he was active in the chorus, the Howard Players, and he began his writing career. During his time at Howard, he met and befriended classmate Leroi Jones, whose own interest in furthering black art would act as a considerable influence on Spellman's future endeavors. Spellman graduated in 1956 with a Bachelor of Science degree in political science and then continued with studies in Howard's law school.

In 1959, Spellman began a career as a music critic for magazines such as Metronome and Down Beat, for which he wrote reviews of jazz music and musicians. His first book of poems, The Beautiful Days, was published by Poets Press in 1965. Not only was the work well received, it considerably raised his profile as a writer. His reputation, however, was truly solidified by his first full-length book, Four Lives in the Bebop Business (also known as Four Jazz Lives, 1966), a study of the lives of jazz musicians Cecil Taylor, Ornette Coleman, Herbie Nichols, and Jackie McLean. His experience with jazz has long influenced the form and rhythm of his poetry, and at the 2016 National Book Festival, Joy Harjo, co-presenting with Spellman, referred to him as "one of the major ancestors of jazz poetry." During the 1960s, Spellman wrote liner notes for several Blue Note Records albums.

After touring the nation with several other African-American poets in 1967, Spellman joined the staff of Rhythm Magazine, where he wrote poems and political essays until 1969. After leaving the magazine, he conducted a series of lectures at universities throughout the United States, including Morehouse College, Emory University, Rutgers University, and Harvard. Spellman also started the Atlanta Center for Black Art, one of the many grass-roots initiatives in the growing Atlanta community of black artists that sought to further develop the arts in the black communities beyond the college and university campuses and even beyond Atlanta. The center, although an independent organization, relied on many staff and faculty from the local universities to offer art instruction and performances in a variety of genres, from poetry readings to dramatic plays.

In 1973, Spellman left Harvard to become director of the Arts in Education Study Project for the National Endowment of the Arts (NEA) in Washington, DC. Three years later, he became the director of the NEA's Arts Endowment Expansion Program, a position he held for the next eight years. Between 1994 and 1996, he served as associate deputy for program coordination at the NEA and then became the director of the NEA's Office of Guidelines and Panel Operations. In 1998, he was appointed the deputy chairman for the Office of Guidelines, Panel and Council Operations for the NEA where he remained until his retirement in 2005.

In 2008, he released Things I Must Have Known, a collection of poetry, with Coffee House Press. Shortly after the release of this collection, Spellman spoke in an interview on the importance of small presses, declaring them to be "absolutely essential for poetry". He notes that without these small presses, he and many other poets like him would find no outlet for their work, for the larger publishing companies and commercial magazines publish little poetry to begin with and certainly even fewer works by poets that have not yet made a name for themselves.

A. B. Spellman married Student Nonviolent Coordinating Committee (SNCC) activist and producer Karen Edmonds Spellman on October 14, 1969; they have two daughters, Toyin Spellman-Diaz, oboist for the Imani Winds, and Kaji Spellman Douša, Senior Pastor of Park Avenue Christian Church. A. B. Spellman was formerly married to artist Danielle Ryvlin Spellman; their son is Hollywood writer and producer Malcolm Spellman.
