= Wang Jie (composer) =

Chinese-born American composer (born 1980)

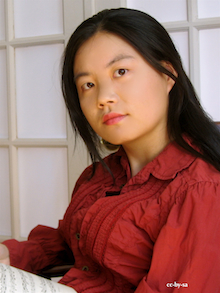
Wang Jie

Wang Jie (Chinese: 王婕; pinyin: Wáng Jié; born 1980) is a Chinese-born American composer.

Wang Jie was born and raised in Shanghai. She was a known piano prodigy at age five. A scholarship from the Manhattan School of Music brought her to the US in 2000, where she studied composition with Nils Vigeland and Richard Danielpour. Her work has been performed across the United States, Asia, and Europe. She has received honors and awards from ASCAP, the BMI Foundation, the American Music Center, Opera America, and the Manhattan School of Music, among others.

== Career ==
While she was still a student, her tragic opera Nannan was showcased by the New York City Opera's VOX, Contemporary Opera Lab. Flown, a chamber opera meditation on two lovers who must separate, was produced by the Music Theatre Group, and the Emily Dickinson-inspired song cycle I Died for Beauty was featured at the opening ceremony of the Beijing Modern Music Festival. Her piano trio, Shadow, which dramatizes the inner life of an autistic child, was performed by the New Juilliard Ensemble as curtain-raiser for the Museum of Modern Art's Summergarden concert series.

As the first composer awarded the Milton Rock Fellowship prize, she was commissioned to compose the environmentally aware ballet Five Phases of Spring for Philadelphia's The Rock School for Dance Education, and her Death of Socrates won the Northridge Composition Prize.

Her Symphony No. 1 (Awakening) was featured by the Minnesota Orchestra at the 2010 Future Classics concert, and a new work is in process for the 45th anniversary celebration of Continuum at Lincoln Center.

John Corigliano described Symphony No. 1 (Awakening) as 'gorgeously written – she knows how to take a few notes and spin them into a large form – a rare trait in today's composers. Robert Beaser described her work as of 'elegance and elemental clarity', the Pittsburgh Tribune-Review characterizing it as 'scrupulously crafted composition that embraces both Chinese and Western modern classical expression.'

From the Other Sky, awarded the American Composers Orchestra's Underwood Commission, a 'charming multimedia-comic-opera-meets-song-cycle in four scenes' premiered at Carnegie Hall 15 October 2010 to positive notices such as that of Steve Smith of The New York Times, who noted the work's 'vibrant, polished' quality.

In February 2012 Wang Jie was awarded the Charles Ives Scholarship of the American Academy of Arts and Letters.

In July 2012 she was awarded the sixth annual Elaine Lebenhorn award of the Detroit Symphony Orchestra.

== Personal life ==
In 2016 Wang married Performance Today radio host Fred Child.

== Selected works ==
=== For orchestra ===
- Deer Cry (2004)
- Three Miniature Pieces for Orchestra (2004)
- Death of Socrates (2006)
- The Book of Songs – Swamp's Shore (2007)
- Fanfare for Orchestra (2007)
- Requiem (2007)
- Symphony No. 1 (2008)
- Five Faces of Joy (2009)

=== Operas ===
- Nannan (2007)
- From The Land Fallen (2015)
