= Brandon Patrick George =

American flutist

- Origin: Dayton, Ohio, United States
- Genres: Classical Music
- Occupations: Musician, flutist
- Years active: 2008–present
- Website: www.brandonpatrickgeorge.com

Brandon Patrick George is an American flutist.

He is the flutist of Imani Winds as well as a soloist and chamber musician, and has been a guest artist with various orchestras. With Imani Winds he won a 2024 Grammy Award.

== Education ==
George graduated from the Stivers School for the Arts in Dayton, OH in 2004. He then studied at the Oberlin Conservatory of Music with Michel Debost, graduating in 2008, and in Paris with Sophie Cherrier. He received a Master of Music degree from the Manhattan School of Music in 2010.

== Imani Winds ==
George was appointed flutist of Imani Winds in 2018, succeeding founder Valerie Coleman. With Imani Winds he has toured extensively, and with the group has received three Grammy nominations and in 2024 a GRAMMY Award for Best Classical Compendium, for the live recording Passion For Bach And Coltrane arranged and composed by Jeff Scott

== Career ==
George has performed as a soloist with the Atlanta Symphony Orchestra, Albany Symphony Orchestra, American Composers Orchestra, Baltimore Symphony Orchestra, and the Orchestra of St. Luke's. He has appeared as guest principal flute with the Los Angeles Philharmonic, and performed with the Pittsburgh Symphony Orchestra, Orpheus Chamber Orchestra, and the International Contemporary Ensemble.

He has collaborated with artists and ensembles including the Escher String Quartet, composer Valerie Coleman, pianist Aaron Diehl, harpist Bridget Kibbey, and with harpsichordist Mahan Esfahani on an ongoing Bach project.

In 2020 he was named, with Imani Winds, to Manhattan School of Music's inaugural roster of Artist Scholars. In 2021, he was part of the inaugural class of WQXR’s Artist Propulsion Lab, a program designed to advance rising artists' careers.

On May 4 2023, George made his Lincoln Center debut as a headlining soloist with the concert program "Twofold" presenting the repertoire from his 2023 album by that name.

== Educator ==
George joined the faculty of the Curtis Institute of Music in 2021. In 2025, he was appointed to the flute faculty at the Mannes School of Music at The New School. He has also taught at the Banff Centre.

== Commissioning ==
In 2024 George launched a Community Concerto Project, a projected multi-year project to commission new flute concertos, with the Albany Symphony Orchestra and a newly commissioned concerto by Michael Gilbertson. The Project envisions new commissions of works for flute to be performed with a small ensemble of local students, conveying a community's story and connecting a city's classical musicians and local students through mentorship and collaboration.

== Personal life ==
George lives in Brooklyn, New York.

== Discography ==
Flute Sonatas and Solo Works, George's debut solo album, included works by Johann Sebastian Bach, Pierre Boulez, Kalevi Aho, and Sergei Prokofiev. It was released by Hänssler Classics on September 18, 2020.

In 2023 he released his second solo album, Twofold, on which he paired canonical solo flute works with music by contemporary composers including Saad Haddad, Reena Esmail, Shawn Okpebholo, and Tōru Takemitsu, encompassing Hindustani and Japanese as well as European musical traditions.
