= Tucson Symphony Orchestra =

American symphony orchestra

- Orchestra
- Founded: 1928
- Location: Tucson, Arizona

The Tucson Symphony Orchestra (TSO) is the primary professional orchestra of Tucson, Arizona. Founded in 1928, when the season consisted of just two concerts, the TSO is the oldest continuously running performing arts organization in the Southwest. The TSO's season now runs from September to May and consists of over 60 concerts, including a Classics Series of eight programs, a Pops Series of four programs, a Masterworks series of five chamber orchestra programs, a number of one-night only specials, and run-out concerts to surrounding areas, such as Oro Valley, Green Valley, Bisbee, Safford, Thatcher, and Nogales. The TSO also provides educational programming that reaches over 40,000 school children each season. Within the TSO are a number of standing chamber ensembles, including a string quintet, piano trio, harp trio, brass quintet, and woodwind quintet. These ensembles help provide educational programming through school visits, perform recitals annually, and also perform at private and community events.

The TSO performs music of a variety of styles, including classical, big-band, folk, jazz, pop, mariachi, and also commissions and performs new works by living composers.

== History of the TSO ==
The TSO performed its first concert on January 13, 1929, with Camil Van Hulse at the podium. The program, performed at the Tucson High School auditorium, featured 60 volunteer musicians from throughout the community (including co-founder Juliani on double bass).

The orchestra played Schubert's Rosamunde Overture and Beethoven's Symphony No. 7. Local papers hailed the debut as a monumental achievement and said the audience greeted the symphony's performance with “surprise, admiration and bursts of enthusiasm.”

Though there were only two concerts the first season, the second offered three concerts and featured a new conductor, Joseph De Luca, who remained with the Symphony for five years. Concerts were held on Sunday evenings at 8:30. The early concert programs were all-orchestral; on March 16, 1930, soprano Mary Margaret Fischer appeared as the orchestra's first soloist.

Midway through the third season, the TSO moved to the Temple of Music and Art, first playing there on January 25, 1931.

== 1930s – 1950s ==
In the late 1930s, the TSO's financial situation was tenuous, prompting a decision to merge with the University of Arizona. From 1939 to 1950, the TSO existed under the auspices of the university, sharing access to music, offering credit to students who performed with the orchestra, and financial support. The orchestra performed under George C. Wilson from 1939 until his retirement in 1946, and then with Professor Samuel Fain from 1946 through his retirement in 1950.

Concerts were held in the UArizona Auditorium (now known as Centennial Hall).

As the 1950s opened, the orchestra was faced with a dilemma. Until this time, the musicians of the orchestra had not been paid. The Local 771 Union suggested payment of $15 a concert, but was met with opposition. After a yearlong standoff (which included 19 musicians and the conductor walking out), a coup de grace was found with a performance by John Charles Thomas, the most famous baritone at the time. By raising ticket prices (to $10, from $5) and filling 2200 seats, the TSO went into the black and proved that it was possible to pay the musicians. A budget was agreed upon in 1951 that included musician pay.

1952 saw the arrival of Frederic Balazs, the TSO's first full-time, paid conductor and the debut of the Tucson Symphony Women's Association, the first organization formed to support the TSO.

In 1958, the Tucson Symphony Youth Orchestra was founded, and it was also the first year of the annual Cotillion fundraiser.

== 1960s-1970s ==
Through the 1960s, the orchestra continued to expand in size and in budget. The decade brought the first-ever grant from the Tucson City Council ($2500, in 1965), the first performance with the Tucson City Chorus (a sold-out 1966 event), the first sold-out concert season (1967), and the first year that the operating budget surpassed $100,000 (1968).

In 1971, the TSO, under the direction of Music Director Gregory Millar moved to its current performance space- The Tucson Music Hall (now known as the Linda Ronstadt Music Hall). The opening performance was led by Arthur Fiedler (who also participated in a parade on a fire truck as part of the festivities the following day).

The TSO celebrated its 50th anniversary in the 1978-79 season, which included a concert featuring 99 musicians conducted by Music Director Dr. George Trautwein. Camil Van Hulse also returned to conduct the Rosamunde overture, a special nod to the orchestra's first performance.

== 1980s-1990s ==
By the early 1980s the budget surpassed $500,000, earning the status of regional orchestra from the American Symphony Orchestra League. Music Director William McGlaughlin (now well known as the host of Exploring Music on National Public Radio) arrived in 1982 and established the Joy of Music series for families with young children. He was succeeded by Robert Bernhardt in 1987, who became a fixture in the community (and a frequent guest conductor following his departure).

During the 1990s, the organization was also able to purchase an administrative and rehearsal space that it still occupies today: The Tucson Symphony Center. Its outreach and education programs expanded, including the launch of the Young Composers Project. Thanks in part to grant funding, the TSO performed in communities throughout Southern Arizona, including Ajo, Bisbee, and Nogales.

George Hanson, the TSO's longest-serving Music Director, arrived in 1996. Under his leadership, the TSO began performances in 2000 at the acoustically excellent Catalina Foothills High School auditorium, which has since become a firm favorite as the TSO's second home. In 2003 the TSO Chorus was formed under the direction of Dr. Bruce Chamberlain, and continues to perform with the orchestra today for Handel's Messiah and other orchestral choral masterworks.

== Present ==
Maestro José Luis Gomez was appointed in 2016, the TSO's first-ever Spanish-speaking music director. Under his artistic leadership, the TSO has expanded the quality and breadth of its programming, with a special focus on southern Arizona's cultural heritage. In his first season, the orchestra performed to 150,000 people at the iconic All Soul's Procession in downtown Tucson. Most recently, the TSO launched ¡Celebration latina!, a series of concerts embracing the large Hispanic and Latin community. Maestro Gomez has also invested his energies in the Young Composers Project, commissioning several alumni for works on the main series. The TSO presents a number of new collaborations annually, including performances with Mariachi Aztlán de Pueblo High School, the Tucson Girls Chorus, the Tucson Arizona Boys Chorus, the Tucson International Mariachi Festival, Orkesta Mendoza, and Calexico.

In 2022, the TSO's home downtown was renamed as the Linda Ronstadt Music Hall.

In the 2023–24 season the TSO celebrates its 95th anniversary. The organization is a member of the League of American Orchestra's Group 3 with an annual budget of 6 million dollars. Over forty concerts a year are performed across the Classic, Masterworks, and Special Events series.

== Music directors ==
The orchestra has played under the leadership of the following music directors:

Years	Name
1928–1929	Camil Van Hulse
1929–1935	Joseph DeLuca
1935–1937	Henry Johnson, Jr.
1937–1938	Iver Johnson
1938–1939	William X. Foerster
1939–1946	George C. Wilson
1946–1950	Samuel S. Fain
1950–1951	Stanley Schultz
1951–1952	Harold Goodman
1952–1966	Frederic Balazs
1966–1977	Gregory Millar
1977–1981	Dr. George Trautwein
1981–1982	Denis de Coteau (music advisor)
1982–1987	William McGlaughlin
1987–1996	Robert Bernhardt
1996–2015	George Hanson
2016–present	José Luis Gomez

== See also ==
- Compositions by Bill McGlaughlin
- Bill McGlaughlin
