= Fred Child =

American radio host

- Born: March 30, 1963 (age 63); Huntsville, Alabama
- Origin: Portland, Oregon
- Occupations: Radio host, musician
- Instruments: Piano, guitar, marimba, bagpipes

Fred Child (born March 30, 1963) is an American radio executive and host. From 2000 until October 2025, he was the host of the classical music radio program Performance Today on American Public Media. He is also the announcer and commentator for the PBS program Live from Lincoln Center.

== Early life and education ==
Child was born in Huntsville, Alabama. He moved to Portland, Oregon, while still a young child, and began studying classical piano. He attended Oregon State University, where he was first exposed to radio work while hosting a jazz program on the student-run campus radio station.

== Career ==
After graduation from university, Child was host, announcer, producer, and programmer for Oregon Public Broadcasting for ten years, including five years (1990–94) on his two-hour weekend program of World Music called Music Confluence. Child then moved to New York City and worked at WNYC, where he became music director, director of cultural programming, and also host of the program Around New York. He worked at WNYC until 2000, when he was chosen to replace Martin Goldsmith as host of Performance Today, when Goldsmith stepped down to pursue writing.. Since January 2, 2026 he has been the President and Chief Executive Officer of All Classical Radio (KQAC), based in Portland, Oregon.

In addition to Performance Today, Child is the host of NPR's Creators @ Carnegie; a contributor to NPR's All Things Considered; and a host for live broadcasts of important concert events from New York City, Los Angeles, and London. He also appears on-stage doing pre-concert talks for the Baltimore Symphony Orchestra, New York's Lincoln Center, the Aspen Music Festival, and the Washington Performing Arts Society.

Child is also a keen musician, playing the piano, guitar, marimba, and bagpipes. His group, Balafón Marimba Ensemble, once opened for the Grateful Dead at Oakland Coliseum.

== Personal life ==
In 2016, Child married Chinese-American composer Wang Jie.

== Discography ==
- Balafón Marimba Ensemble, Shanachie Records 67002 (1990) (as guest artist)
