= Park Avenue Christian Church =

Interdenominational church in Manhattan, New York

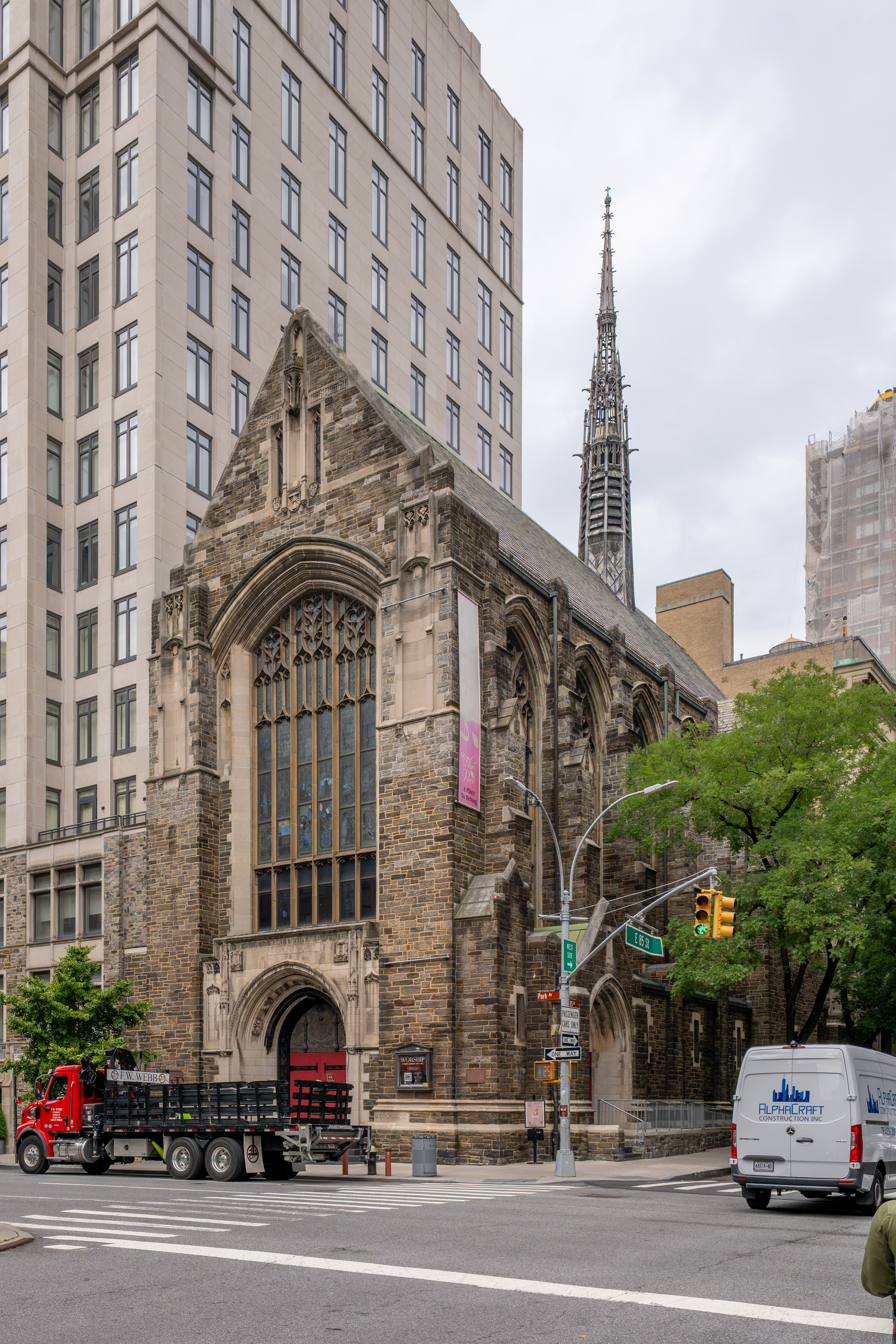
- The exterior of the church building in 2026

- Location in Manhattan, New York City
- 40°46′46″N 73°57′29″W
- Location: Upper East Side, Manhattan
- Address: 1010 Park Avenue, Upper East Side, Manhattan, New York City, New York 10028
- Country: United States
- Denomination: Disciples of Christ; United Church of Christ
- Previous denomination: Presbyterian Church (US) (1914–1945)
- Website: parkavenuechristian.com

History
- Former names: South Dutch Reformed Church (1911–1914); Park Avenue Presbyterian Church (1914–1940); Betina Evangelical Church (1940–1945)
- Status: Church
- Founded: 1810 (as a Christian congregation)

Architecture
- Functional status: Active
- Architect: Cram, Goodhue & Ferguson
- Architectural type: Church
- Style: Gothic Revival
- Completed: 1911

Specifications
- Materials: Stone

Temple of Universal Judaism
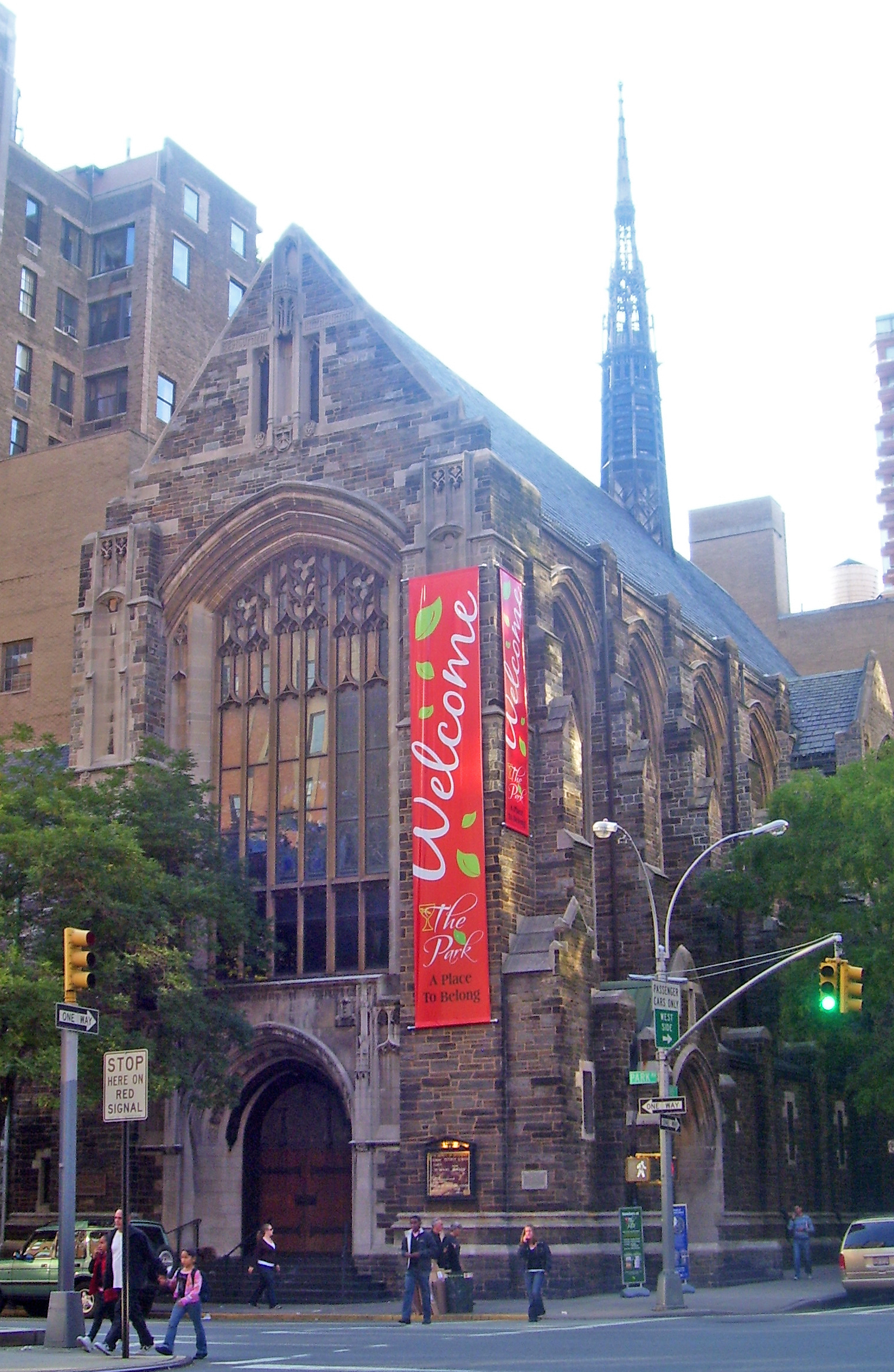

Religion
- Affiliation: Reform Judaism
- Ecclesiastical or organisational status: Synagogue
- Status: Active

Location
- Location: 1010 Park Avenue, Upper East Side, Manhattan
- Interactive map of Temple of Universal Judaism

Architecture
- Established: 1974 (as a congregation)
- Direction of façade: East

Website
- tuj-torahnyc.org

The Park Avenue Christian Church is a joint Disciples of Christ and United Church of Christ church located at 1010 Park Avenue at 85th Street, on the Upper East Side of Manhattan, in New York City, New York, United States. The Rev. Kaji S. Douša has served as Senior Pastor since 2016. She is the first woman and the first Black woman to be called to this role, the second African-American after the Rev. Alvin Jackson, Pastor Emeritus.

The church also shares its facilities and cosponsors interfaith events with the Temple of Universal Judaism (TUJ), also known as Congregation Da'at Elohim, a Reform Jewish congregation and synagogue.

== Architecture ==
In 1911, the original owners, the South Dutch Reformed Church, commissioned the firm of Cram, Goodhue & Ferguson, to design the Park Avenue sanctuary. Their designer, English architect William Heywood, was inspired by the features of La Sainte-Chapelle in Paris, which were translated into the stately proportions and the slender 70-foot (21 m) spire (flèche) of its New York counterpart. Buttresses enabled the building to stand without any steel girding, typical of its Gothic Revival style.

The east stained glass window was designed by Louis Comfort Tiffany for the South Reformed Church's previous location at 38th Street and Madison Avenue, then re-installed in the Park Avenue church. The other stained glass is the work of Tiffany's one-time employee, artist and businesswoman Mary Elizabeth Tillinghast.

After the South Dutch Reformed Church was disbanded in 1914, with its remaining members merged with the First Union Presbyterian Church, the building was renamed as the Park Avenue Presbyterian Church. In 1937, that congregation merged with Brick Presbyterian and the combined congregations remained on Park Avenue at 85th Street until 1940, when their present building on Park Avenue and 91st Street was opened. From about 1940–45, the 1010 Park Avenue building was home to the Betina Evangelical Church.

The Central Christian Church purchased the building and its congregation was renamed Park Avenue Christian Church in 1945. The original rectory was replaced in 1963 by a much larger five storey facility which in addition to church facilities also houses the church's day school. A 56-rank organ, built by Holtkamp, was installed in 1982. Major restoration of the sanctuary building was completed in 1993. The building is an architectural "landmark" of New York City.

In 2015, the New York City Landmarks Preservation Commission approved a controversial development that involved the demolition of the church's 1963 annex and sale of land and adjacent air rights to enable construction of a 16-storey 210-foot (64 m) limestone and schist-clad residential tower, comprising eleven condominium units including a 33-foot (10 m) penthouse. The developer and the church entered into a $24 million contract for the sale of the annex. The units ranged in price from $15-to-$50 million each.

== History ==
The Park was formed by nine former members of the Ebenezer Church of New York City in 1810, out of a "fervent desire to embrace a pure and simple understanding of church life as found in the New Testament," part of a wider movement that led to the formation of the Disciples of Christ movement and denomination. Beginning with its participation in the movement to abolish slavery during the 19th century, the Church has espoused an ethical commitment to pursue social justice. One of its current emphases is a commitment to diversity, using the phrase “Divinity of Diversity” as a touchstone statement for this commitment. The Park's commitment to justice includes deconstruction of systems of oppression such as white supremacy, xenophobia, sexism, and includes helping to increase the number of Open and Affirming congregations and to eliminate bias regarding sexual orientation. The congregation continues to be committed to the ecumenical movement for Christian unity, community service, interfaith acceptance, peacemaking and a major involvement in the arts, especially music. Since 1989 the church has sponsored a Saturday Lunch Program for the hungry and/or homeless in its facilities. In 2010, The Park became a dually affiliated congregation not only with the Christian Church (Disciples of Christ), its historic affiliation, but also with the United Church of Christ. In 2016, the park called its first female Senior Minister, The Rev. Kaji Douša.

== Temple of Universal Judaism ==
TUJ was founded in 1974 by Rabbi Roy A. Rosenberg as a haven for interfaith couples and families, while also welcoming Jews from other backgrounds, as well as non-Jews interested in Judaism. The congregation holds services once a month and on Jewish holidays. As an example of its efforts to follow the imperative of tikkun olam ("repairing the world") through social action and interfaith cooperation, TUJ holds various events together with The Park, such as the joint annual commemoration in honor of Martin Luther King Jr., and his friend in the civil rights movement, Rabbi Abraham Joshua Heschel.
