= Bill McGlaughlin =

American music radio host (1943–2026)

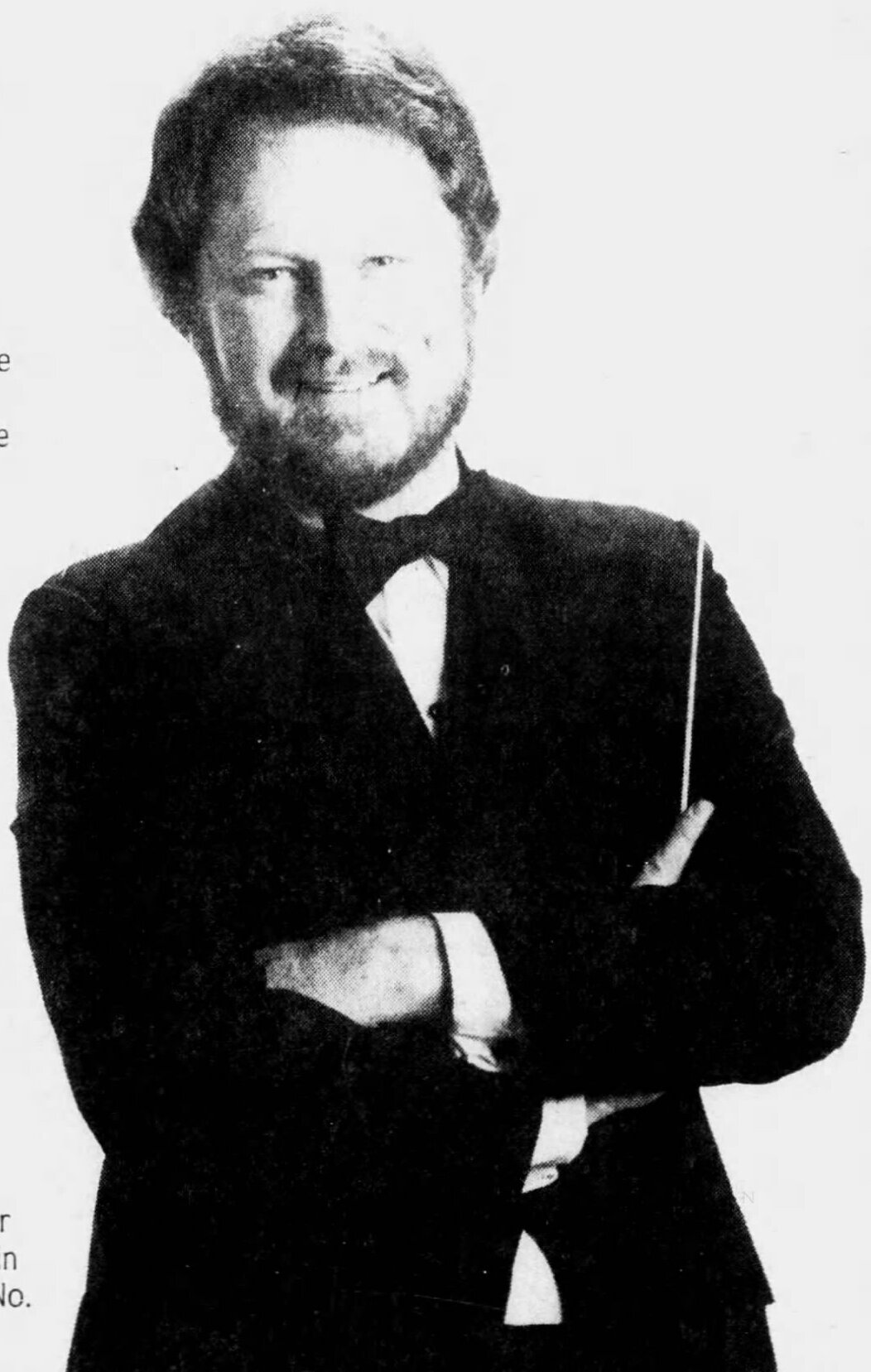
- McGlaughlin in 1982
- Born: William McGlaughlin; October 3, 1943; Philadelphia, Pennsylvania, U.S.
- Died: July 21, 2026 (aged 82); New York City, U.S.
- Occupations: Classical music radio host, music educator, musicologist, composer, conductor
- Years active: 1967–2026
- Known for: Exploring Music; Saint Paul Sunday
- Website: billmcglaughlin.com

William McGlaughlin (October 3, 1943 – July 21, 2026) was an American composer, conductor, music educator, and Peabody Award–winning classical music radio host. He was the host and music director of the public radio programs Exploring Music and Saint Paul Sunday.

A nationally noted radio commentator from 1981 onward, McGlaughlin was known for his cheerful, open, and down-to-earth personality on classical music radio. Beyond his career as a broadcaster and music educator, McGlaughlin also spent a decade as a professional orchestral musician, over three decades as a conductor, and a decade as a composer. He viewed the more recent, radio broadcast aspect of his musical career as outreach – as a way to keep classical music from becoming an increasingly marginalized art form, with ever-smaller and older audiences.

== Early life ==
McGlaughlin was born in Philadelphia, Pennsylvania, on October 3, 1943. His unusual accent stemmed from his Philadelphia childhood and the influence of his Scottish-American grandfather, with whom he lived during his early childhood and late teens. Bill absorbed the music of opera at a very young age, as his draftsman father listened while in his at-home workshop. When Bill was 6, his father gave him a harmonica, and together they enjoyed playing their favorite opera melodies by ear. His father also had many instrumental classical albums, which Bill enjoyed listening to in his own bedroom. Bill's mother, a high-school English teacher, was also a music lover.

At the age of 14, McGlaughlin received his first piano lesson, quite by accident – his younger brother had been taking a series of pre-paid piano lessons but abruptly quit, so Bill was given the remainder. By his second lesson, he knew he wanted to be a professional musician, and began practicing eight hours a day.

== Musical career ==
=== Performing ===
In high school, McGlaughlin took up the trombone, which he further studied in college, obtaining his Bachelor of Music degree from Philadelphia's Temple University in 1967.

Upon graduation in 1967 he became Assistant Principal Trombonist of the Philadelphia Orchestra, a position he held through 1968. From 1969 to 1975 he was Co-Principal Trombonist of the Pittsburgh Symphony.

In addition, during these years in Pennsylvania, McGlaughlin performed in groups such as the Pittsburgh Symphony Players, which he founded in 1973, the Penn Contemporary Players, and the Philadelphia Composers Forum. He also performed as trombonist during many of his 1975–1982 years with the Saint Paul Chamber Orchestra.

=== Conducting ===
Orchestral performance sparked McGlaughlin's interest in conducting – an interest which was encouraged by Pittsburgh Symphony's William Steinberg. In 1969 he completed a Master of Music degree in conducting at Temple University, studying under Robert Page; and in addition he received private instruction and tutelage from William R. Smith, Associate Conductor of the Philadelphia Orchestra, and Max Rudolf. McGlaughlin also became assistant conductor of the Pittsburgh Symphony Chamber Orchestra during his period with the Pittsburgh Symphony.

During his years as a trombonist after his master's degree, he brought a full orchestral score to rehearsals, taking careful notes on how good and poor conductors handled difficult passages. In 1973, he asked Georg Solti whether he should pursue a conducting career; Solti encouraged him, but insisted he needed an orchestra to practice with. McGlaughlin formed three orchestras in Pittsburgh that year – an orchestra of college students, the Pittsburgh Camerata, and the Upper Partials Chamber Players. His practice paid off: In 1975, he was awarded the Exxon-Arts Conducting Endowment, and an assistant conductorship at the Saint Paul Chamber Orchestra.

This led to a series of conducting positions:

- 1975–1982: Assistant Conductor (through 1978) and then Associate Conductor of the Saint Paul Chamber Orchestra
- 1981–1985: Music Director of the Eugene Symphony
- 1982–1987: Music Director of the Tucson Symphony Orchestra
- 1986–1988: Music Director of the San Francisco Chamber Orchestra
- 1986–1998: Music Director of the Kansas City Symphony

During his 12-year tenure with the Kansas City Symphony, McGlaughlin greatly expanded the orchestra's repertoire, commissioned many new works, recorded albums, made two nationwide television broadcasts, including a Christmas special with the King's Singers, greatly strengthened the orchestra's reputation, and brought it to a state of "unparalleled artistic and financial success". In addition, he received five ASCAP Adventurous Programming Awards for his continued performing of contemporary music, and for aiding Kansas City Symphony audiences in understanding the composers' intentions in these works.

McGlaughlin continuously had numerous guest conducting engagements, from a great variety of orchestras around the U.S.

=== Composing ===
McGlaughlin was early on a champion of living composers and new music, dating back to his Pennsylvania days and his involvement with groups such as the Penn Contemporary Players and the Philadelphia Composers Forum. McGlaughlin himself founded the Pittsburgh Camerata (1973), which focused on contemporary music, and he was a steady proponent of living composers' works in Kansas City as well. Eventually, this championing became a desire to compose on his own.

In 1998, he left his conducting position and moved to New York City to concentrate on composing. Prompted by the death of a friend who was a Kansas City pianist and composer, McGlaughlin's first major work was Three Dreams and a Question: Choral Songs on e.e. cummings – which he debuted with the Kansas City Symphony on April 28, 1998, to an enthusiastic audience and press. Some of the other 20 works he created in his first decade of composing, most of them commissioned, include: Aaron's Horizons (a tribute to colleague Aaron Copland); Echoes, for horn trio; Angelus, a 9/11 remembrance; Three Pieces for Wind Trio; Bagatelles, for saxophone quartet; The Heart's Light: An Essay for Orchestra; Three by Six, for chamber ensemble; and The Bells of St. Ferdinand, for orchestra.

For a millennial celebration, he was chosen from a field of 350 composers to write a major new work for Continental Harmony, a nationwide cultural initiative commissioned by the National Endowment for the Arts and the American Composers Forum. The composition, Walt Whitman's Dream, premiered in July 2000, and celebrated the new millennium with a combined chorus of nearly 800 singers from around the world, accompanied by orchestra.

On December 15, 2005, the national two-hour daily NPR classical music radio program Performance Today announced that out of all of the music aired that week, McGlaughlin's new composition Remembering Icarus garnered the most, and the most heartfelt, listener response. The piece has been re-broadcast on radio three times.

Discussing his own music, McGlaughlin described his compositional style as more intuitive than intellectual, and said that he does not shun tonality: "I think when composers turn completely away from tonality, they lose a big part of storytelling." Some of his work incorporates or references elements of jazz – for instance Bela's Bounce, an homage to Béla Bartók and Charlie Parker.

== Radio career ==
=== Saint Paul Sunday ===
In the late 1970s, during his conducting stint in Saint Paul, Minnesota, McGlaughlin often spoke to the audience before a performance, informally explaining the program and what to listen for. Garrison Keillor heard him, and invited him to fill in occasionally as host of his daily morning radio show on Minnesota Public Radio (MPR). MPR producer Tom Voegeli came up with the idea for a new show: Saint Paul Sunday Morning, with McGlaughlin as host. MPR had just received a public radio communications satellite uplink, as well as seed money to develop a few pilot shows for national distribution. Voegeli wanted a program which would present world-class musicians, in an informal live setting in MPR's new state-of-the-art studio, to a national audience. Voegeli also wanted McGlaughlin to sound like himself – a musician – rather than like a broadcaster, and to share his own intimate, animated enthusiasm with listeners.

The show, retitled Saint Paul Sunday, debuted locally in 1980, and went national via syndication in 1981. The weekly one-hour show, which aired through 2012, featured live in-studio performances by and interviews with the world's top classical musicians, both soloists and ensembles. It was America's most widely listened to weekly classical music program produced by public radio, and aired on approximately 200 stations nationwide. The show, with McGlaughlin as host and music director since its inception, was awarded the Peabody Award in 1995.

McGlaughlin's enthusiasm for the show and the music was evident: "If I had been able to imagine Saint Paul Sunday as a kid," he says, "I think I'd have been in ecstasy at the idea of having the whole wide world of music to run around in, and best of everything, to be able to bring friends along."

=== Exploring Music ===
In 2002, Steve Robinson, Vice President of WFMT Radio Network, approached McGlaughlin to host a daily radio show, which would showcase and explicate great works of classical music. Robinson notes, "As far as I'm concerned, no one can top Bill in the way he conveys his passion for music on the radio." The show, Exploring Music, debuted nationally in 2003, and has proved very popular with audiences of all ages and levels of expertise. The program, which explores a single classical music theme each week in one-hour daily episodes, has been praised for the enthusiasm and relatability with which it brings classical music appreciation to a large audience, and as of 2008 has over 500,000 listeners.

Exploring Music garnered McGlaughlin, as its host and music director, the Lifetime Achievement Award from Fine Arts Radio International in 2004, "because he has taken up the music education baton implicitly passed to him by the late Karl Haas, whose Adventures in Good Music has metamorphized into Exploring Music, with an ear tuned to the evolving trends of the 21st-century classical audience." Fine Arts Radio International concluded by saying, "Exploring Music, with its weekly thematic concept, provides the classical radio listener with both in-depth education and compelling radio listening, a balance that is rarely achieved." In 2011, the Association of Music Personnel in Public Radio presented him with the AMPPR Lifetime Achievement Award, citing "McGlaughlin's incredibly knowledgeable but always inviting and warm presence with which he guides listeners to discover the heart, soul and humor of the music he plays".

McGlaughlin was let go from Exploring Music at the end of 2025, in the midst of multiple host shake-ups at WFMT. McGlaughlin's last new series to air on the show, dealing with the Belle Époque, was cut in half due to his dismissal. He told the Chicago Tribune that he was offered no feedback or rationale on his dismissal and the non-renewal of his annual contract.

=== Additional media appearances ===
McGlaughlin was the co-host of the nationally syndicated radio series Center Stage from Wolf Trap since its inception in 1999. He was also the host, since 2007, of the newly relaunched nationally syndicated radio series Concerts from the Library of Congress.

In addition to these and to Saint Paul Sunday and Exploring Music, since 1986 he also hosted, and occasionally conducted, a number of radio and television programs on NPR, PRI, PBS, and the BBC, and on local NPR affiliates. He also lectures at and hosts live concerts and concert series and other musical events around the country.

Drawing upon his expertise as a conductor and his abilities as a music commentator, McGlaughlin contributed one of the ten chapters in the 2008 book, Leonard Bernstein: American Original. Editor Barbara Haws describes McGlaughlin's chapter, "On the Podium: Intellect and Energy", in her introduction to the book:

Bernstein's passion on the podium is perhaps the most indelible image he has left us. By evaluating Bernstein's marked conducting scores in the Philharmonic Archives and analyzing his televised performances, conductor, composer, and radio personality Bill McGlaughlin brings together the ephemeral with the workaday to understand better Bernstein's hold over the popular imagination and his remarkable rapport with musicians. Melding the flamboyant public display with the private meticulousness seen in the scores provides new insights, and confirms long-held assumptions about what Bernstein was hoping to achieve.

== Personal life ==
McGlaughlin married jazz singer Karrin Allyson in 2025 after 35 years of partnership. The couple met in 1990 in Kansas City. He co-produced and assisted on most of Allyson's CDs, and also often accompanied her on the road when she toured. Beginning in 2020, they co-hosted B&K Cafe, an hour-long monthly light classical music and jazz program, with commentary, on the WWFM network.

McGlaughlin had two grown children from a former marriage. He continued to compose, and continued to do guest conducting, concert hosting and lecturing, and other classical music outreach around the country throughout his life. He died from sudden cardiac arrest on July 21, 2026, at the age of 82, at his home on Manhattan's Upper West Side.

== Awards and honors ==
- 1975–1978: Exxon-Arts Conducting Endowment, with the Saint Paul Chamber Orchestra
- 1984, 1988, 1993, 1997, 1998: ASCAP Awards for Adventurous Programming (Kansas City Symphony)
- 1990 Deems Taylor Award (ASCAP) for Saint Paul Sunday
- 1990 Honorary Doctorate, Westminster College
- 1995 Peabody Award for Saint Paul Sunday
- 1997 Honorary Doctorate, Rockhurst University
- 2004 Fine Arts Radio International Lifetime Achievement Award
- 2007 Boyer Tribute Award, Temple University
- 2008 Dushkin Award, Music Institute of Chicago, for Exploring Music
- 2011 Association of Music Personnel in Public Radio, Lifetime Achievement Award

== Sources ==
- Phillips, Lisa. "Classical Music's Hotai Buddha: Bill McGlaughlin". In: Public Radio: Behind the Voices. Vanguard Press, 2006. pp. 313–320.
- Bio – American International Artists
- Bio – Subito Music
- Bio – Saint Paul Sunday
