= Karl Haas =

German-American radio host

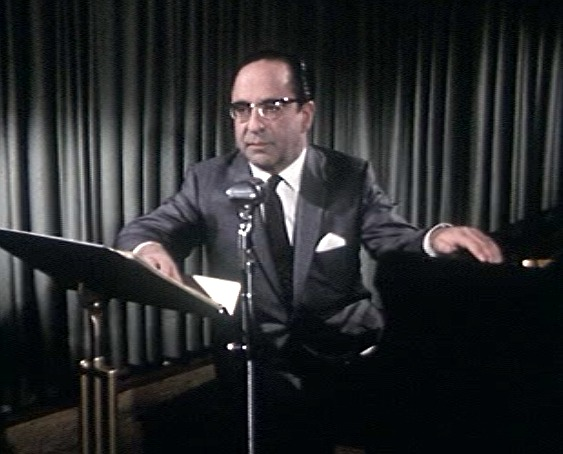
- Karl Haas at WJR
- Born: December 6, 1913; Speyer, Palatinate, Germany
- Died: February 6, 2005 (aged 91); Royal Oak, Michigan, U.S.
- Occupations: Radio host, musicologist, pianist, conductor

Karl Haas (December 6, 1913 – February 6, 2005) was a German-American classical music radio host, known for his sonorous speaking voice, humanistic approach to music appreciation, and popularization of classical music. He was the host of the classical music radio program Adventures in Good Music, which was syndicated to commercial and public radio stations around the world. He also published the book Inside Music. He was a respected musicologist, as well as an accomplished pianist and conductor. In 1996, he received an honorary degree in Doctor of Letters from Oglethorpe University.

== Early life and family ==
Haas was born in Speyer, Palatinate, Germany in 1913. He studied at the Mannheim Conservatory and earned a doctorate in music literature from Heidelberg University. He studied piano with Artur Schnabel. Faced with the rise of Nazism, the Jewish Haas fled Germany for the United States in 1936. He first settled in Detroit, Michigan, then lived in other places, returning to Detroit near the end of his life. He and his wife, Trudie, had two sons and one daughter. Trudie died in 1977.

== Adventures in Good Music ==
Haas began his radio program, Adventures in Good Music, on WJR in Detroit, Michigan in 1959. Syndicated broadcasts of the show across the United States began in 1970 on WCLV, a radio station in Cleveland, Ohio. The show was eventually syndicated to commercial and public radio stations around the world and became the world's most widely heard classical music radio program.

The theme music for Adventures in Good Music was the second movement from Beethoven's "Pathétique" Sonata (Sonata No. 8 in C minor), performed by Haas live for each program. He started every show with his trademark greeting "Hello everyone", and later entitled a track of his CD with those words. For several years the program had the most listeners of any classical music radio show in the world.

Haas received the Charles Frankel Award of the National Endowment for the Humanities in 1991. President George H. W. Bush presented the award to him at the White House. Haas also twice won the George Foster Peabody Award for excellence in broadcasting. In 1997 he became the first classical music broadcaster to be named to the National Radio Hall of Fame.

Haas did not produce any new episodes of the show in the last two years of his life. WCLV continued to syndicate recordings of his previous shows until June 2007. That month, WCLV announced "with great regret" that it would broadcast and syndicate its last Adventures in Good Music program on June 29, 2007. The announcement explained that the number of stations that carried the show had dropped from more than 400 to fewer than 20, which made it unfeasible to continue the program's national distribution.

Most episodes of Adventures in Good Music are not available publicly because of copyright, which is closely held by his family, although three cassettes/CDs have been issued featuring Haas and his commentary: The Romantic Piano, The Story of the Bells, and Song and Dance. In the 1960s Columbia Records released a Karl Haas commercial LP, "How to Listen to a Symphony," on their Columbia Special Products label.

== Death ==
Near the end of his life, Haas returned to Detroit. He died at the age of 91 on 6 February 2005 at a hospital in Royal Oak, Michigan. He was survived by his sons, Jeffrey and Andrew, by his daughter, Alyce, and by two grandchildren.

== See also ==
- Bill McGlaughlin
- Exploring Music

== Bibliography ==
- Haas, K. (1999). Inside Music. South Melbourne, Macmillan. ISBN 0-7329-1004-8
