= Valerie Coleman =

American composer and flutist (born 1970)

- Origin: Louisville, Kentucky
- Genres: Classical, Jazz, Soul
- Occupations: Composer, Flutist, Educator
- Instruments: Flute
- Years active: 1997–present
- Labels: Naxos Records; Blue Note Records; E1 Music
- Formerly of: Imani Winds
- Website: VColemanMusic.com

Valerie Coleman is an American composer and flutist as well as the creator of the wind quintet Imani Winds. Coleman is a distinguished artist of the century who was named Performance Today's 2020 Classical Woman of the year and was listed as “one of the Top 35 Women Composers” in The Washington Post. In 2019, Coleman's orchestral work, Umoja, Anthem for Unity, was commissioned and premiered by the Philadelphia Orchestra. Coleman's Umoja is the first classical work by a living African American woman that the Philadelphia Orchestra has performed.

Coleman is known for her many contributions to wind chamber music and with Imani Winds, she released a number of studio albums with the group, one of which was nominated for Grammy Award for Best Classical Crossover Album in 2005. She received a nomination for the Grammy Award for Best Contemporary Classical Composition in 2025, for Revelry.

A graduate of Mannes College of Music and taught by musicians such as Julius Baker, her compositions frequently incorporate diverse styles such as jazz with classical music and often incorporate political or social themes. Her piece Umoja in 2002 was listed as one of the "Top 101 Great American Works" by Chamber Music America. She is an alumna of the Chamber Music Society of Lincoln Center's CMS Two Fellowship program, and a laureate of the Concert Artists Guild competition. Coleman is represented by Charlotte Lee at Primo Artists.

== Early life and education ==
Valerie Coleman was born and raised in Louisville, Kentucky, in the same West End inner city neighborhood that boxer Muhammad Ali grew up in. Her father died when she was nine, and her mother raised Coleman and her sisters as a single working mother.

From early childhood, Coleman had a love for music and a great interest in playing the flute. She started her formal music education in fourth grade, at age eleven. During her early years as a young musician, Coleman was interested in composing music. She started writing symphonies as a hobby, using a portable organ that she had at her home. By age fourteen she had written three full-length symphonies and won several local and state competitions, as well as participating as a flutist in youth orchestra. She is a graduate of Louisville Male High School.

Coleman and all her sisters attended college, and she earned a double B.A. in theory/composition and flute performance from Boston University. She then graduated with a master's degree in flute performance from Mannes College of Music. Coleman studied flute with Julius Baker, Alan Weiss, Judith Mendenhall, Doriot Dwyer, and Mark Sparks, and composition with Martin Amlin and Randall Woolf.

== Imani Winds ==
In 1996, while still a student, Coleman began planning a chamber music ensemble. She chose the name Imani Winds, Imani being the Swahili word for faith, and sought African American woodwind players who might approach classical music from a similar cultural background. About her reasons for starting the ensemble:

I used to be in the youth orchestra [as a child], and there were so many African Americans. But somewhere along the line, when I got to college, I was the only one in the orchestra. So I wondered what in the world happened here? It came to my mind that role models are needed.

— Valerie Coleman, NPR

The group grew to five people, with Coleman on flute, Toyin Spellman-Diaz on oboe, Monica Ellis on bassoon, Mariam Adam on clarinet, and Jeff Scott on french horn. From the beginning the ensemble focused on "championing composers that were underrepresented from the non-European side of contemporary music." The repertoire frequently involves music that is inspired by many different cultures including influences from the music of Africa, Latin America and North America.

In 2001 the group won the Concert Artists Guild competition, and over the following years released five albums internationally on the E1 Music label (formerly known as Koch International Classics), with many of those tracks composed by Coleman herself. About their musicianship, the New Orleans Times Picayune stated, "As an ensemble, the Imani Winds cultivate the big, rich sound one associates with classical players -- and they also display the daring, respond in-the moment qualities one associates with a swinging jazz combo."

The ensemble was named resident-artists of Chamber Music Society of Lincoln Center, and has appeared in major concert halls throughout the United States. The ensemble has won awards from Artists International and the 2005 ASCAP/WQXR-FM Award for Adventurous Programming, and were honored at the 2007 ASCAP Concert Music Awards.

NPR Music named their album Terra Incognita one of the "5 Best American Contemporary Classical Albums Of 2010," saying "Imani Winds' members have earned a reputation for expanding the recorded wind-quintet repertoire, but in a way that's culturally significant." According to the Cleveland Classical, "Imani Winds have carved a unique path into the world of classical chamber music for themselves through inventive programs, commissioning projects, and educational activities, and above all superb musicianship."

=== Imani Winds Chamber Music Festival (IWCMF) ===
In 2009 Coleman conceived and created the Imani Winds Chamber Music Festival, which is both an institute and chamber music series on the Lincoln Center Campus in New York City. The festival attracts artists from the US and abroad.

In 2012 composers were added to the roster through the Emerging Composers Program. It involved master classes with composers such as Mohammed Fairouz and Daniel Bernard Roumain, and the panel of guest artists included Stefon Harris, Paula Robison, Carol Wincenc, and Stanley Drucker.

== Solo career ==
Coleman made her debut as a flutist and composer at Carnegie Hall in 2004, and prior to that was the understudy for flutist Eugenia Zukerman at Lincoln Center. Coleman was also a featured soloist in the Mannes College of Music's Mannes 2000 Bach Festival. She has had performances and premieres at Alice Tully Hall, Chamber Music Society of Lincoln Center, The Kennedy Center, Chamber Music Northwest, and Philadelphia Chamber Music Society.

Her compositions and performances receive regular play on classical radio stations in the United States, and she has been showcased on the New York classical radio station WQXR. She also appeared on NPR's Performance Today, All Things Considered, and The Ed Gordon Show; WNYC's Soundcheck, and MPR's Saint Paul Sunday. In April 2008 she was featured in Flutist Quarterly.

She has received commissions from the San Francisco Chamber Orchestra, Brooklyn Philharmonic, The National Flute Association, Hartford Symphony Orchestra, College Band Director's National Association, West Michigan Flute Association, and The Flute and Clarinet Duos Consortium.

She has been a teacher for the Chamber Music Society of Lincoln Center, has served on the faculty of the Juilliard School's Music Advancement Program and Interschool Orchestras of New York. She's given flute masterclasses at SUNY Purchase, Columbus State, UMass Amherst, Ohio State, Ithaca College, Utah State, Norfolk State, and Hampton University, She has also been a composer/flutist in residence with Young Audiences NYC, and completed a mentorship with the Brooklyn Philharmonic. Coleman is on the advisory panel of the National Flute Association.

== Compositions ==
Coleman is the resident composer of Imani Winds, though the ensemble also incorporates the work of other members and composers. Coleman's style mixes modern orchestration with genres including jazz and Afro-Cuban. She has added a number of works to the flute repertory, also contributing to the literature for wind quintet, full orchestra, woodwinds, brass, and strings, many of which have been published by International Opus.

As a flute player, Valerie Coleman has composed many works that have become a standard part of the flute repertoire. One of these pieces include Danza de la Mariposa. This work is a tone poem written for solo flute and was inspired by the various types of butterflies that live across South America. Coleman also composed Amazonia, a piece for flute and piano. This piece begins by portraying the beauty of the Amazon rainforest. However, the music starts to portray darker themes throughout the composition, which represent the corrupting and destructive influence humans have on the Amazon rainforest.

She often interposes music with the words of historical figures and poets, in some cases using manipulated speeches of people of diverse as Robert F. Kennedy, A. Philip Randolph and Cesar Chavez.

About her world premiere of Painted Lady, a set of two songs for orchestra and soprano and her first commission, The Hartford Courant said "The songs are luminous works, with a tangy but accessible harmonic language, graced with a humanizing sense of melodic line and a mildly exotic rhythmic lilt. They are the work of a major talent, and they should be recorded immediately." The songs used words by African American poet Margaret Danner.

Her signature wind quintet piece Umoja (named for the Swahili word for "unity") in 2002 was listed as one of the "Top 101 Great American Works" by Chamber Music America. Umoja was originally composed for a women's choir in celebration of the first day of Kwanzaa. Since then, Coleman has arranged Umoja with a wide variety of instrumentation. This includes an arrangement for flute quartet, wind trio, brass quintet, and string quartet. Additionally, Umoja was arranged for orchestra and performed by the Philadelphia Orchestra in 2019. This marks the first time the Philadelphia Orchestra performed a work by a living African American female composer. Josephine Baker: A Life of le Jazz Hot in 2007 traced the life Josephine Baker, receiving a positive review in The Philadelphia Inquirer.

== Academia ==
In 2018, Coleman was appointed as Assistant Professor of Performance, Chamber Music, and Entrepreneurship; and Director of the Chamber Music program at Frost School of Music, at the University of Miami (FL).

In 2021, Coleman was appointed a Clara Mannes Fellow within the Flute Performance and Music Composition faculty at Mannes School of Music, at The New School in New York City.

In 2024, Coleman was appointed to the composition department faculty effective in the 2024–25 academic year at the Juilliard School in New York City.

== Awards ==
- Aspen Music Festival Wombwell Kentucky Award
- Michelle E. Sahm Memorial Award at the Tanglewood Music Festival
- Meet The Composer's Edward and Sally Van Lier Memorial Fund Award, 2003
- the Wombwell Kentucky Award for study at the Aspen Music Festival, 2003
- Michelle E. Sahm Award for flutists, 2003
- Received the Multi-Arts Production Fund - a grant given to "support innovative new works in all disciplines and traditions of performing arts."
- Performance Today's 2020 Classical Woman of the Year

=== Grammys ===
Year	Category	Song/album	Label	Result
2005	Best Classical Crossover Album	The Classical Underground	Koch Int'l Classics	Nominated
2025	Best Contemporary Classical Composition			style="background: #FFE3E3; color: black; vertical-align: middle; text-align: center; " class="no table-no2 notheme"|Nominated

== List of compositions ==
=== Wind quintet ===
- 2001: UMOJA
- 2002: speech. and canzone
- 2005: Afro-Cuban Concerto
- 2006: Suite: Portraits of Josephine - 4 Movements
- 2009: Red Clay and Mississippi Delta - Scherzo
- 2011: Tzigane

Arrangements

- "Afro Blue - Mongo Santamaria"
- "NKOSI SI KE LEL 'I AFRIKA - Enoch Sontaga" (South African national anthem)
- Spirituals, Vol.1 ("Every Time I Feel the Spirit", "Steal Away", "Little David Play on Your Harp")
- "Lift Ev'ry Voice and Sing"
- Various holiday songs

=== Chamber music ===
- 2003: UMOJA for wind sextet
- 2005: Sonatine for Clarinet and Piano
- 2006: Maombi Asante - A Prayer of Thanksgiving for flute, violin, and cello
- 2006: Suite: Portraits of Josephine - A Ballet in 8 Movements for chamber ensemble
- 2007: Suite: Portraits of Langston for flute, clarinet & piano
- 2007: LENOX AVENUE for clarinet, violin, cello, and piano
- 2008: Des Filmes Epiques for wind and string quartet
- 2009: Our God of Voiceless Things for choir, wind quintet, and jazz ensemble
- 2011: Four Winds of Ol' Forester for flute, violin, cello and mp3
- 2012: Rubispheres for flute, clarinet and bassoon
- 2012: Ruby St. Nola for three C flutes
- Pontchartrain for flute choir

=== Orchestral ===
- 2005: The Painted Lady
- 2018: Phenomenal Women
- 2019: UMOJA
- 2020: Seven O'Clock Shout

=== Concert band ===
- 2008: UMOJA
- 2009: ROMA
- 2013: Arabia for intermediate concert band

=== Solo flute ===
- 2011: Danza de la Mariposa (Theodore Presser)

== Discography ==
=== Imani Winds ===
Studio albums

- 2002: Umoja
- 2005: The Classical Underground (E1 Music)
- 2006: Imani Winds (E1)
- 2007: Josephine Baker: A Life of le Jazz Hot (E1)
- 2008: This Christmas with Imani Winds (E1)
- 2010: Terra Incognita (E1)
- 2013: Mohammed Fairouz: Native Informant (Naxos Records)
- 2013: Without a Net (Blue Note Records)

== Personal life ==
Coleman lives with her husband, Jonathan Page, and daughter, Lisa.
