= Kaji Douša =

American Christian minister and immigration rights activist

The Reverend Kaji Spellman Douša
- Born: United States
- Education: University of Pennsylvania; Yale Divinity School
- Occupations: Senior Pastor, activist
- Organizations: Park Avenue Christian Church; New Sanctuary Coalition NYC

Kaji Spellman Douša (born August 22) is an American Christian minister and immigration rights activist who served as the chair of the New Sanctuary Coalition NYC.

== Biography ==
Douša is the senior pastor of the Park Avenue Christian Church in Manhattan. From 2018-2020 Douša served as president of the alumni board at Yale Divinity School. Douša was born on August 22 in the United States to civil rights activists Karen and A.B. Spellman. She is the youngest of their two children and is half-sister to Malcolm Spellman. Douša is married and has one child.

Pastor Douša (pronounced “doe-sha”) is the first woman to serve as the Senior Pastor of her 212-year-old congregation, the Park Avenue Christian Church, in Manhattan.

In the summer of 2020, she helped to lead many of the rallies and marches organized in response to the murders of Breonna Taylor and George Floyd. In the midst of the uprisings, she and a group of mostly Black clergy women built a new, member-based organization called Daughters 4 Justice (D4J) to constructively work with and hold to account lawmakers and the NYPD in order to re-envision public safety in NYC. D4J’s basic premise is that a city structured around the safety of Black children will be safe for everyone.

She is a graduate of the University of Pennsylvania and of Yale Divinity School, where she earned a Bachelor of Arts degree cum laude and a Master of Divinity degree, respectively. She serves on Planned Parenthood Federation of America’s Clergy Advocacy Board, where she served on the 2020 U.S. Presidential endorsement committee for the Action Fund. Planned Parenthood regularly invites Pastor Kaji to speak at national rallies, events and press appearances on its behalf.

In 2017 Douša protested the detainment of immigrants, including that of New Sanctuary Coalition Executive Director Ravi Ragbir. In October 2018, Douša spoke at the protests against the Supreme Court nomination of Brett Kavanaugh, in support of fellow Holton-Arms School alumna Christine Blasey Ford, who had accused Kavanaugh of sexual assault. Her related sermon was subsequently featured in the Washington Post.

In January 2019, upon her return to San Diego after ministering to migrants in Tijuana, she was stopped by U.S. Customs and Border Protection agents at the San Ysidro Port of Entry and held for questioning. Following, Douša alleges that she was put on a watch list of more than 50 people who have worked on the migrant crisis currently developing at the U.S.-Mexico border, a process which she says led to an unlawful revoking of her Secure Electronic Network for Travelers Rapid Inspection pass. On July 2, 2019, Amnesty International called for an end to border surveillance programs, referencing Douša's case. In July 2019, Dousa filed the federal case Douša v. U.S. against the Department of Homeland Security alleging violation of her First Amendment rights and the Religious Freedom Restoration Act. Co-counsel Arnold & Porter and Protect Democracy are representing her, led by Arnold & Porter partner, R. Stanton Jones. Over 850 religious leaders signed an open letter of support for her lawsuit.

Kaji Douša won her civil rights lawsuit against the federal government in March 2023.
