= Peter Van de Graaff =

American singer and radio personality (born 1961)

Peter Van de Graaff (born November 9, 1961) is an American singer and radio personality. He is best known as the host of the Beethoven Satellite Network (BSN) overnight classical music service, which is carried over approximately 150 radio stations across the USA.

== Biography ==
Van de Graaff is a native of Chicago, Illinois. He grew up in Glencoe, Illinois and attended New Trier High School. He attended Brigham Young University, where he received a Bachelor of Arts degree in Vocal Performance. While there, he began working as an announcer on KBYU-FM, the university's classical-music FM radio station. He was also announcer for the Utah Symphony live broadcasts. Following his graduation he remained with the station, rising to the post of Senior Producer. In 1986 the station expanded to around-the-clock broadcasting, with Van de Graaff hosting the morning program. In 1988 Van de Graaff returned to Chicago, obtaining an announcer post at the city's fine-arts FM radio station WFMT. In 1989 he became a program host for the syndicated Beethoven Satellite Network. In 2015 he relocated to Eugene, Oregon.

Van de Graaff married a professional soprano singer, Kathleen. They appear together occasionally, especially to perform the early eighteenth-century chamber works known as opera intermezzi.

Van de Graaff has performed with opera companies and orchestras worldwide. He speaks several languages, including Dutch, German, French. He also has studied Russian, Spanish and Italian.

== Career ==
Van de Graaff began his radio career in 1984 at KBYU-FM in Utah, then moved to WFMT in Chicago as a staff announcer in 1988. Beginning in 1989 he became a program host for the Beethoven Satellite Network, a nationally syndicated classical music program service that is now carried on over 150 stations (he became Program Director of the Beethoven Satellite Network in 1996). He has hosted other nationwide broadcast series, including the Vienna Philharmonic Orchestra, the Van Cliburn Piano Series, Opera from the European Broadcasting Union, Music of the Baroque and the Vermeer Quartet.

Van de Graaff sings in the bass-baritone range, and has performed throughout the world. He performed and recorded a Vorisek Mass with the Czech State Symphony under Paul Freeman. Accompanied by the Czech Philharmonic he has sung Beethoven's Missa Solemnis throughout the Czech Republic and Poland. He appeared in Berlin with the Chicago Symphony Orchestra in Arnold Schoenberg's Moses und Aron. In Budapest he sang with the Budapest Concert Orchestra in Verdi's Requiem and in Tel Aviv, the Israel Chamber Orchestra accompanied him in a Mass of Mozart. He performed a recital in Tokyo. He has sung throughout the United States, with the Houston Symphony, Chicago Symphony, Utah Symphony, San Antonio Symphony, Syracuse Symphony, Louisiana Philharmonic, Omaha Symphony, Wichita Symphony, Colorado Springs Symphony, Richmond Symphony and others. He has performed with Pierre Boulez, Christopher Wilkins, Paul Freeman, Bernard Labadie, Paul Hillier, Joseph Silverstein, Robert Page, Thomas Wikman, Jane Glover, Klaus-Peter Seibel, Victor Yampolsky, James Paul, Daniel Hege and Nicholas Kraemer. He was a soloist in the San Luis Obispo Mozart Festival, Costa Rica International Music Festival, Chicago's Music of the Baroque, Pittsburgh Bach Choir, Grand Teton Music Festival, St. Louis Early Music Festival, Boulder Bach Festival and others. He and Kathleen have premiered several Intermezzi. He performed with the Lyric Opera of Chicago, Florentine Opera, Milwaukee Opera, Rochester Opera, Chicago Opera Theater, and the Cedar Rapids Opera.

In autumn 2015, it was announced that Van de Graaff would become the music director and morning host for KWAX at the University of Oregon in early 2016, and continue hosting the Beethoven Network from Eugene.

On 24 August 2026, Van de Graaff took over hosting Exploring Music, which originated from WFMT in Chicago, replacing long-time host, the late Bill McGlaughlin.

== Awards and recognitions ==
Van de Graaff received the 2010 Karl Haas Prize for Music Education from the Klassix Society/Friends of KXMS.
