= Imani Winds =

American wind quintet

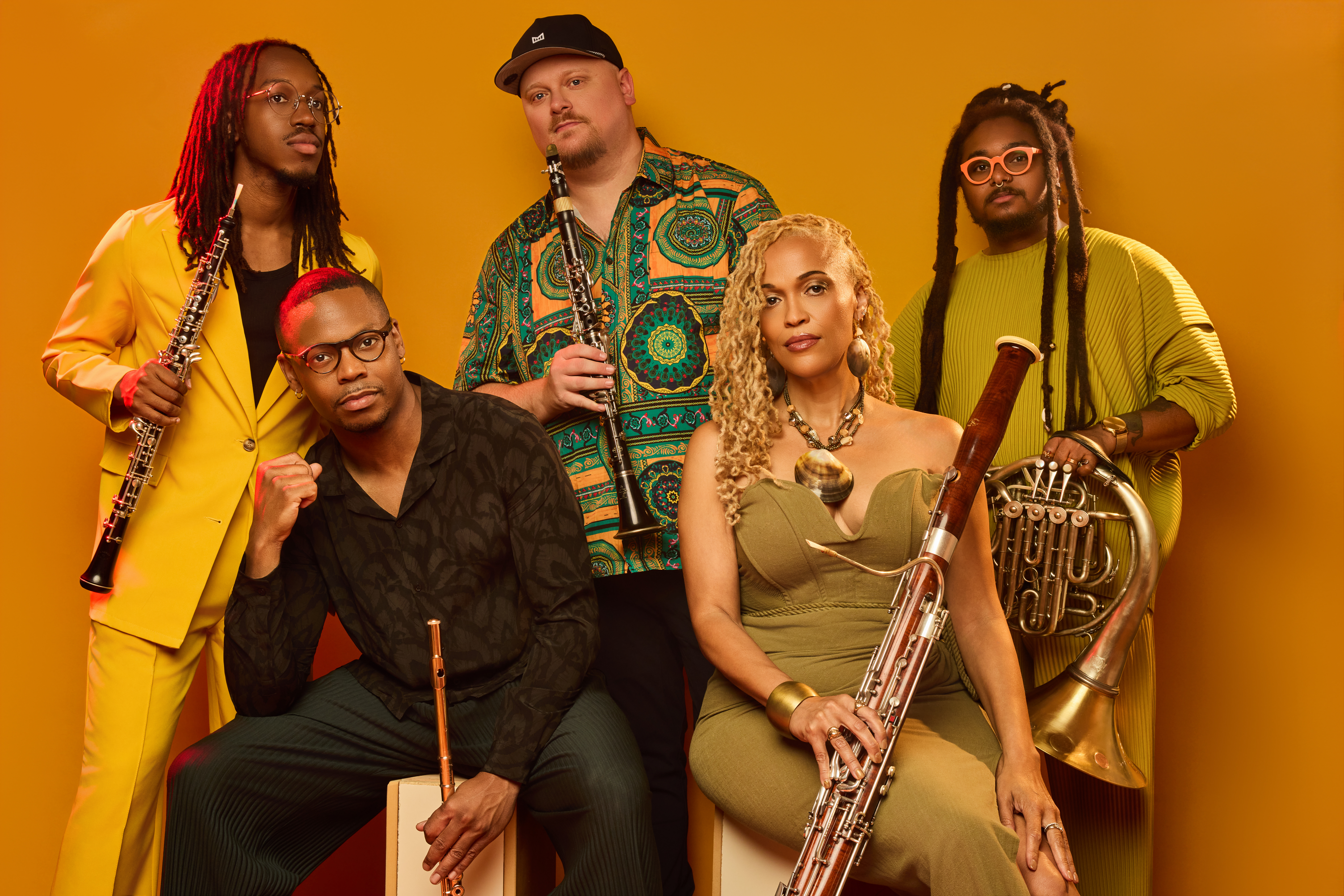
- Imani Winds in 2025

Background information
- Origin: New York City, United States
- Genres: Classical, Chamber music, Jazz, Latin
- Years active: 1997–present
- Label: Koch Int'l Classics/Koch Entertainment
- Members: Brandon Patrick George, flute Mekhi Gladden, oboe Mark Dover, clarinet Kevin Newton, French Horn; Monica Ellis, bassoon
- Past members: Valerie Coleman, flute Jeff Scott, French Horn; Mariam Adam, clarinet, Toyin Spellman-Diaz, oboe
- Website: www.ImaniWinds.com

Imani Winds is a Grammy Award-winning American wind quintet based in New York City, United States. The group was founded by flutist Valerie Coleman in 1997 and is known for its adventurous and diverse programming, which includes both established and newly composed works. The word Imani means "faith" in Swahili. They are also active commissioners of new music with the intent of introducing more diverse composers to the wind quintet repertoire.

== Overview ==
The name "Imani Winds" was chosen by Coleman before she formed the quintet. She viewed it as a vision of what the quintet could mean to African-American and other underrepresented communities. Coleman wanted to form a chamber group to highlight the work of underrepresented composers and performers. Therefore, the group's initial members were all of African American and Latino ancestry. The group first included Valerie Coleman on flute, Toyin Spellman-Diaz on oboe, Monica Ellis on bassoon, Mariam Adam on clarinet, and Jeff Scott on french horn. In 2016 Mark Dover replaced Mariam Adam, in 2018 Brandon Patrick George replaced Valerie Coleman, in 2021, Kevin Newton replaced Jeff Scott, and in 2025, Mekhi Gladden replaced Toyin Spellman-Diaz.

The group has released nine CDs. Their first CD on a major label, The Classical Underground (Koch Entertainment), was released in January 2005 and was nominated for a Grammy Award in 2006. Their 2023 album Passion for Bach and Coltrane, a multimedia collaboration with poet A. B. Spellman, won the 2024 Grammy Award for Best Classical Compendium.

In 2001 they won the Richard S. Weinert Award for Innovation in Classical Music from the Concert Artists Guild. In 2002, they won the CMA/ASCAP Award for Adventurous Programming and the CMA/WQXR Recording Award for their first album Umoja.

In 2006 & 2009, they performed with the Naumburg Orchestral Concerts, in the Naumburg Bandshell, Central Park, in the summer series.

In 2007, they won the ASCAP Concert Music Award.

Imani Winds have toured throughout the United States, Canada, and Europe, and participated in Chamber Music Society Two, a professional residency program of The Chamber Music Society of Lincoln Center. In addition, Imani has toured internationally and recorded with saxophonist Steve Coleman, performed with pop recording artists Morley, and opened for Cassandra Wilson and Wynton Marsalis. They have performed with several notable jazz musicians such as Wayne Shorter, Steve Coleman, Paquito D'Rivera, and Steffon Harris. They have appeared on radio programs including Saint Paul Sunday, Performance Today, Performance Today, News & Notes, The Bob Edwards Show, and The World.

=== Legacy Commissioning Project ===
Imani Winds began the Legacy Commissioning Project in 2008 with the intention of commissioning and premiering ten new works for wind quintet by composers of color and diverse backgrounds over a five-year period. The group has continued to commission and premiered more works after the initial five-year time frame, and the group has continued their original intent to introduce more diverse composers to the standard wind quintet repertoire.

== Commissions ==
Composer	Title(s)	For LCP	Notes
Fred Ho	Josephine Baker's Angels from the Rainbow	Yes	
Paquito D'Rivera	Kites	Yes	
Wayne Shorter	Terra Incognita	Yes	
Alvin Singleton	Through it All	Yes	
Roberto Sierra	Concierto de Camara	Yes	
Jason Moran	Cane Jump Cut Rose	Yes	
Daniel Bernard Roumain	Five Chairs and One Table	Yes	
Stefon Harris	Anatomy of a Box (A Sonic Painting in Wood, Metal, and Wind)	Yes	
Jonathan Russell	Arrangement of Stravinsky's Rite of Spring Arrangement of Rimsky-Korsakov's Scheherazade Arrangement of Holst's The Planets	Yes	
Simon Shaheen	Zafir	Yes	
Danilo Perez	Travesias Panamenas	Yes	
Muhammed Fairouz	Jebel Lebnan Deep Rivers	Yes	
Vijay Iyer	Bruits	Yes	
Jeff Scott	Passion for Bach & Coltrane	Yes	
Frederic Rzewski	Sometimes	Yes	
Reena Esmail	The Light is the Same	Yes	
Courtney Bryan	Blooming	Yes	
Valerie Coleman	Bronzeville Phenomenal Woman, Concerto for Wind Quintet	Yes	
Aaron Helgeson	Calls of close and away	Yes	
Henry Threadgill	2.6 Pentadactyl	Yes	
Alison Yun-Fei Jiang	On Light and Birds	Yes	
Ted Moore	feedback vii: speak, contain	Yes	
Kevin Kay	Quiver	Yes	
Maria Kaoutzani	Speak, Mind	Yes	
J. P. Redmond	9X9: Nine Pieces for Nonet	Yes	
James Primosch	Four Sketches	Yes	
Jessie Montgomery	Sargeant McCauley	Yes	
Ledah Finck	Fractured Fossil	Yes	
Nathalie Joachim	Seen	Yes	
Richard Wernick	Quintet for Winds	No	Premiered but did not commission
Kenji Bunch	Shout Chorus	No	Premiered but did not commission

== Discography ==
Year	Title	Label
2002	Umoja	Imani Winds
2005	The Classical Underground	Koch International Classics / Koch
2006	The Imani Winds	Koch International Classics / Koch / Koch International
2007	Josephine Baker: A Life of le Jazz Hot!	eOne / Koch / Koch International Classics
2008	This Christmas	Koch / Koch International / Koch International Classics
2010	Terra Incongnita	E1 Entertainment
2013	Stravinsky: The Rite of Spring	EMI Classics
2016	Startin' Sumthin'	eOne
2021	Bruits	Bright Shiny Things
2023	Passion for Bach and Coltrane	Imani Winds Media Production

With Steve Coleman

- 1999 – The Ascension to Light

With Brubeck Brothers Quartet

- 2008 – Classified

With Chick Corea

- 2012 - The Continents: Concerto for Jazz Quintet & Chamber Orchestra

With Wayne Shorter

- 2013 – Without a Net

With Mohammed Fairouz

- 2013 – Native Informant

With Edward Simon

- 2018 – Sorrows & Triumphs
