= The Midnight Special (radio) =

American syndicated radio show

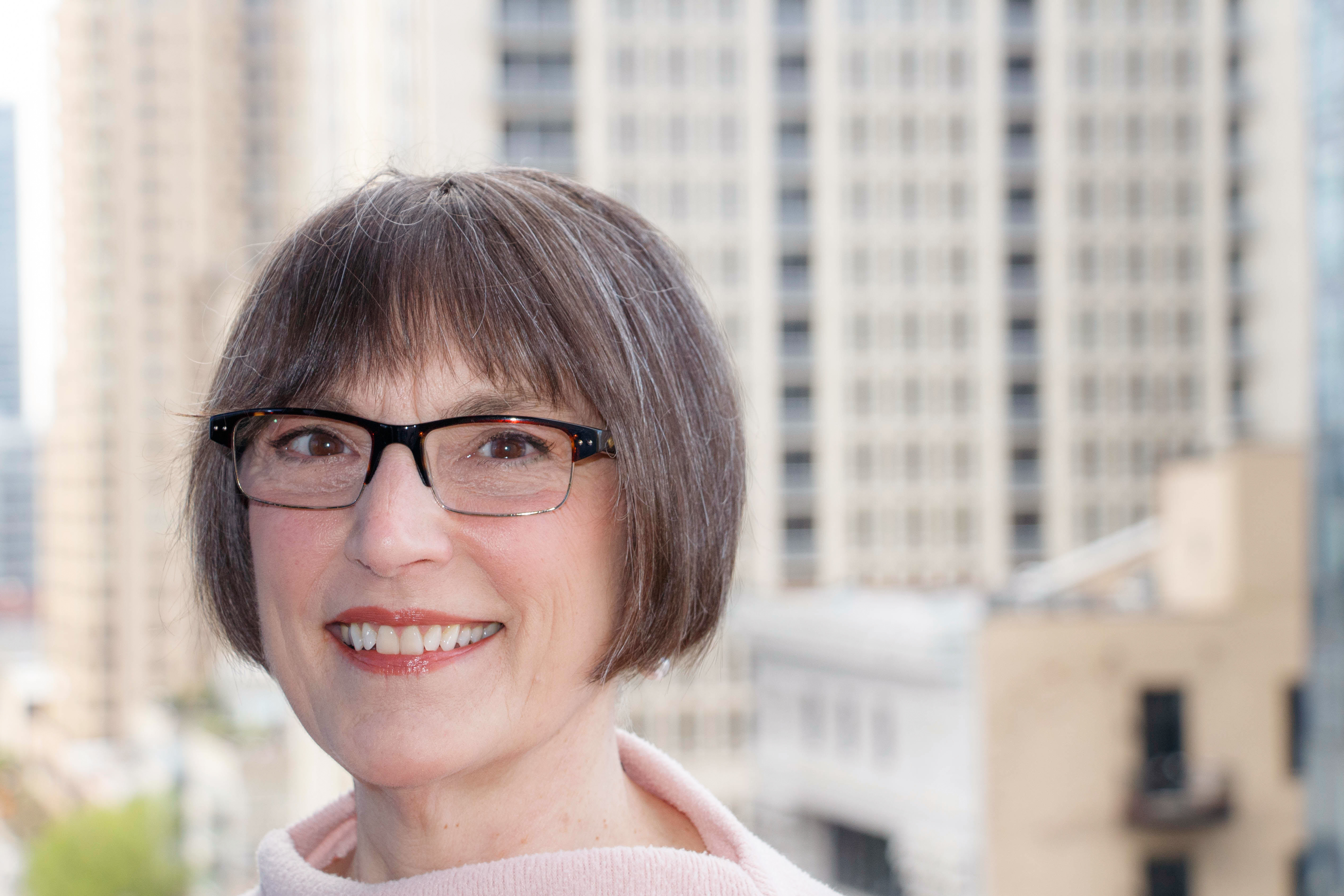
- Marilyn Rea Beyer, host since 2020.
- Genre: Folk music, farce, showtunes, & satire
- Country of origin: United States
- Language: English
- Home station: WFMT-FM at 98.7 MHz
- Syndicates: WFMT Radio Network
- Hosted by: Mike Nichols; Norman Pellegrini; Ray Nordstrand; Rich Warren; Marilyn Rea Beyer
- Created by: Mike Nichols
- Recording studio: Chicago, Illinois
- Original release: 1953 – Present
- Audio format: Stereophonic
- Opening theme: The Midnight Special
- Website: https://www.wfmt.com/programs/the-midnight-special/

The Midnight Special is a syndicated radio show broadcast on Chicago, Illinois, radio station, WFMT-FM (98.7 MHz) since 1953. It is a showcase for folk and roots music from historical and contemporary artists. The show also features comedy sketches and show tunes. The official description is: "folk music & farce, show tunes & satire, madness & escape." The show is named after the well known folk song of the same name, which is often associated with Lead Belly, whose version of the song is used as the show's opening theme. The show title also tied into its time slot, as it was broadcast on WFMT near midnight every Saturday. As of 2023 it begins at 9 p.m. and ends at midnight and is Chicago's longest running radio program.

In 1953, Mike Nichols (later notable as a comedian, writer, actor, and director) created a Saturday evening folk music program. Early regular guests were local musicians including Fleming Brown, Win Stracke and Big Bill Broonzy. They would play in the station's studio, a converted ballroom on the West Side of Chicago. When Nichols left the program Norman Pellegrini became the host and it evolved to a mix of released and live-performance recordings, with only occasional live concerts. Ray Nordstrand also shared the hosting responsibilities of "The Midnight Special" until 1994. Various celebrities guest-hosted the program over the years, including Tom Paxton, and theater directors Frank Galati and Robert Falls. In 1974, Rich Warren was hired to help produce the program and was invited to help out hosting in 1983. He became the sole host of the program in 1996. He retired from the show in 2020 having never missed an episode. Marilyn Rea Beyer replaced Rich Warren as host in 2020.
