= Saint Paul Sunday =

Music radio program

- Genre: live classical music performance and interviews
- Running time: 60 minutes, weekly
- Country of origin: United States
- Home station: Minnesota Public Radio
- Syndicates: American Public Media; Sirius XM Radio; Radio New Zealand Concert
- Hosted by: Bill McGlaughlin
- Created by: Tom Voegeli
- Written by: Bill McGlaughlin
- Produced by: Vaughn Ormseth
- Executive producer: Mary Lee
- Recording studio: Saint Paul, Minnesota
- Original release: 1980 – 2007 (original recordings); 2007 to 2012 (encore broadcasts)
- Website: saintpaulsunday.publicradio.org

Saint Paul Sunday is a Peabody Award-winning weekly classical music radio program that aired from 1980 to 2007, with encore broadcasts airing through 2012. It was hosted by Bill McGlaughlin for its entire run. At its height, it was America's most widely listened to weekly classical music program produced by public radio, and aired on approximately 200 stations nationwide. Programs since 1997 are also available as archived audio on the Internet. The hour-long show featured live, in-studio performances by and interviews with the world's top classical musicians, both soloists and ensembles.

For each hour-long show, McGlaughlin invited a virtuoso soloist or ensemble into the studio to discuss and perform music. The music on the program generally fit under the wide umbrella of classical music, and the pieces performed ran the gamut from late medieval through to contemporary music.

Saint Paul Sunday was distributed by American Public Media, and produced in the St. Paul, Minnesota studios of Minnesota Public Radio, American Public Media's main subsidiary.

== Format ==
=== Premise ===
According to the Saint Paul Sunday website, the show's premise was, "What would it be like to hear the Juilliard String Quartet perform in your living room? Or to invite violinist Joshua Bell over for brunch and Bach?" Host Bill McGlaughlin opened the studio to the world's best classical musicians, of every conceivable style and mix, for both discussion and performance — giving listeners intimate access to how excellent music was created. McGlaughlin engaged each soloist or ensemble in spontaneous live questioning and conversation, so that insights, anecdotes, and commentary alternated with live performances by the guest musicians.

One of the show's intentions was to disprove the misconception that chamber music is open only to connoisseurs. McGlaughlin aimed to dispel this view, and to make the music fresh, lively, and fun.

=== Outreach ===
To keep the music and performances contemporary and relevant to today's audiences, Saint Paul Sunday expanded the definition of chamber music. The show included a diverse and eclectic mix of performers and music from around the world — music and musicians which have included Brazilian choro music from the Robison-Lubambo-Baptista Trio, American gospel group the Albert McNeil Jubilee Singers, Latin-American and African carols and folk dances from Andrew Lawrence-King and The Harp Consort, the viol quartet Phantasm, jazz trumpeter Art Farmer, Bolivian Andean music specialists Rumillajta, eclectic composer Mark O'Connor and the Appalachia Waltz Trio, and African-American Latino wind group Imani Winds.

Saint Paul Sunday often hosted performances of recent music by living composers — composers which have included Thomas Adès, George Tsontakis, Osvaldo Golijov, Fred Lerdahl, Derek Bermel, Frederic Rzewski, and dozens of others. In addition, Saint Paul Sunday has itself commissioned new works from composers such as Pierre Jalbert, Aaron Jay Kernis, Nicholas Maw (in partnership with PRI), Kenneth Frazelle, Gabriela Lena Frank, and Edgar Meyer, among others.

For physical outreach, from time to time McGlaughlin and Saint Paul Sunday traveled to do on-site programs with notable classical musical ensembles at various venues around the U.S. These concerts generated much excitement from local audiences. To further make classical music more accessible to more people, Saint Paul Sunday did residencies at primary and secondary schools in the Midwest — which included recording sessions, performances, and question-and-answer sessions with McGlaughlin, the musicians, and the students.

== Inception and history ==
During the late 1970s, Pennsylvania native Bill McGlaughlin, a trombonist and conductor, was engaged as Associate Conductor of the Saint Paul Chamber Orchestra. Before conducting a performance he often spoke to the audience, informally explaining the program and what to listen for. Garrison Keillor heard him, and invited McGlaughlin to fill in occasionally as host of his daily morning radio show on Minnesota Public Radio (MPR).

Around this same time, National Public Radio gained access to a communications satellite, which meant that production was no longer limited to New York, Los Angeles, or Washington, D.C. Cities with uplinks, like St. Paul, could finally produce their own national shows. Consequently, in 1979 the Mellon Foundation provided MPR with seed money to make several pilot programs.

In early 1980, via local benefactors, Minnesota Public Radio also built a new studio — the Maud Moon Weyerhaeuser Studio ("Studio M") — a beautiful space with 20-foot windows overlooking St. Paul's cathedral district. This inspired producer Tom Voegeli, then working in national programming for MPR, to create a new show that would play to the studio's strengths. Voegeli came up with the idea for Saint Paul Sunday Morning, with McGlaughlin as host — a distinctive, intimate program which would present world-class musicians, live, to a national audience. Voegeli also wanted McGlaughlin to sound like a musician rather than like a broadcaster, and to share his own spontaneous, animated enthusiasm with listeners.

The show debuted on MPR in 1980, and was picked up nationally in 1981, eventually shortening its name to Saint Paul Sunday to allow stations to broadcast it at any time of the day on Sunday. The series' unique approach and sense of exuberance and curiosity won it hundreds of thousands of enthusiastic listeners, and the 1995 Peabody Award.

== Notable guests ==
Saint Paul Sunday played host to hundreds of musicians of international repute. These have included many singers, both ensemble and solo; many quartets and trios and various other sizes and combinations of chamber groups; many pianists and other soloists; small orchestras and choruses; and traditional and non-traditional musical groups from around the world.

A small sampling of guests includes such artists as:

- Gil Shaham
- Chanticleer
- Anonymous 4
- Garrick Ohlsson
- Guarneri Quartet
- eighth blackbird
- Joshua Bell
- Empire Brass
- Kronos Quartet
- Imogen Cooper
- Paul Neubauer
- Emerson String Quartet
- Dawn Upshaw
- Yefim Bronfman
- Imani Winds
- Marian McPartland
- Yo-Yo Ma
- Leif Ove Andsnes
- Beaux Arts Trio
- Renée Fleming
- Los Angeles Guitar Quartet
- James Galway
- Hilary Hahn
- Midori
- Jean-Yves Thibaudet
- Marilyn Horne
- Ani Kavafian
- Orion String Quartet
- The Sixteen
- Sharon Isbin
- Thomas Hampson
- Anne-Sophie Mutter

== Impact and reception ==
In 1995 the Peabody Award, the highest honor in broadcasting, was awarded to Saint Paul Sunday. The foundation stated:

For 15 years Minnesota Public Radio's Saint Paul Sunday has provided listeners with extraordinary access to the world's finest classical musicians. The luminaries presented by Bill McGlaughlin, host since the show's inception, ... [are numerous]. Saint Paul Sunday presents emerging new talent as well as commissioned classical works, including those by new composers Aaron Jay Kernis, Kenneth Frazelle, and Edgar Meyer. Through the program's music and discussion format, listeners get to know the people behind the music and gain insight into the creative process. For an excellent series showcasing classical music, a Peabody to Minnesota Public Radio for Saint Paul Sunday.

The Los Angeles Times reported that:

Saint Paul Sunday has a history of [listener] loyalty .... Ask these people what inspires their devotion, and the answers are all variations on one theme: The show achieves an inside look at world-class music-making that is intimate, welcoming, and ultimately addictive.

== Listening ==
Saint Paul Sunday aired on approximately 200 public and commercial radio stations in the U.S. Past, current, and future shows can be listened to on the show's website. The show aired in New Zealand on Radio New Zealand Concert, and on XM Satellite Radio Channel 133 Mondays at 4:00 AM Eastern Time. Online program notes, playlists, and artist profiles for each show are on the Saint Paul Sunday website.

== See also ==
- Chamber music
- Performance Today
- Exploring Music
