= Adventures in Good Music =

Classical music radio program

- Genre: Classical music
- Running time: 60 minutes, daily
- Country of origin: United States
- Language: English
- Home station: WJR; WCLV
- Syndicates: worldwide
- Hosted by: Karl Haas
- Written by: Karl Haas
- Recording studio: WCLV
- Original release: 1959 – 2007
- Opening theme: Beethoven's "Pathétique" Sonata, 2nd movement

Adventures in Good Music, hosted by Karl Haas, was radio's most widely listened-to classical music program, and aired nationally in the U.S. from 1970 to 2007. The program was also syndicated to commercial and public radio stations around the world.

German-American musicologist Karl Haas started Adventures in Good Music in 1959 on radio station WJR in Detroit, Michigan. It was awarded the Peabody Award for excellence in broadcasting in 1962. Syndicated broadcasts began in 1970 on WCLV in Cleveland, Ohio, where the production of the program remained for the rest of its duration.

Each daily episode of the show had a different topic chosen by Haas, and he aired his personal choice of classical music selections relating to it, along with his pleasant blend of explanation, analysis, and background. The theme music for the show was the 2nd movement from Beethoven's "Pathétique" Sonata (Sonata No 8 in C minor), performed by Haas himself, live for each program; and Haas started every show with his trademark greeting "Hello everyone."

Haas retired from broadcasting at age 89 and did not produce any new episodes of Adventures in Good Music after 2002. WCLV continued to syndicate recordings of his shows until June 2007, when the station announced "with great regret" that it would broadcast and syndicate its last program on June 29, 2007. The announcement explained that the number of stations carrying the show had dropped from more than 400 to fewer than 20, which made it unfeasible to continue national distribution. Most episodes are not available publicly because of copyright restrictions (Haas's estate holds the copyrights closely) although three CDs have been issued featuring Haas and his commentary: The Romantic Piano, The Story of the Bells, and Song and Dance.

In 2002, a new program was developed to replace Adventures in Good Music, expanded and updated for a 21st-century audience. The program, Exploring Music, debuted in October 2003, written and hosted by Bill McGlaughlin.
