= Norman Pellegrini =

American radio executive

Norman Pellegrini (July 18, 1929 – July 2, 2009) was an American radio executive, producer, and personality. He was the program director for WFMT radio in Chicago from 1953 to 1996. On air he led WFMT's internationally syndicated broadcasts of live performances from the Lyric Opera of Chicago from 1971 until his retirement. He was also the co-host of The Midnight Special, a folk and humor program which ran for years and was syndicated widely. He also hosted the station's broadcasts of the Chicago Symphony Orchestra's performances beginning in 1976. In 2006 his book 150 Years of Opera in Chicago (co-authored with Robert C. Marsh) was published in Chicago by the Northern Illinois University Press.
