= WFMT =

Classical music radio station in Chicago

Coordinates: 41°52′44.1″N 87°38′8.2″W

- Chicago, Illinois; United States
- Broadcast area: Chicago metropolitan area
- Frequency: 98.7 MHz (HD Radio)
- Branding: 98.7 WFMT

Programming
- Format: Classical music

Ownership
- Owner: Window to the World Communications, Inc.
- Sister stations: WTTW

History
- First air date: May 16, 1948 (as WOAK at 98.3)
- Former call signs: WOAK (1948–1951)
- Former frequencies: 98.3 MHz (1948–1950); 105.9 MHz (1950–1954)

Technical information
- Licensing authority: FCC
- Facility ID: 10801
- Class: B
- ERP: 6,000 watts
- HAAT: 470 meters (1,540 ft)

Links
- Public license information: Public file; LMS
- Webcast: Listen live
- Website: www.wfmt.com

WFMT (98.7 MHz) is a commercial FM radio station in Chicago, Illinois, with a classical music radio format. It is part of Window to the World Communications, Inc, in the same company as Chicago's PBS member station WTTW. WFMT seeks donations on the air and on its website. The station's studios and offices, co-located and shared with WTTW, are at the Renée Crown Public Media Center on North Saint Louis Avenue in the North Park neighborhood of Chicago.

WFMT has an effective radiated power (ERP) of 6,000 watts, and transmits from atop the Willis Tower in Downtown Chicago. It broadcasts using HD Radio technology.

== Programming ==
WFMT has been broadcasting classical music since 1951. Its website says WFMT "strives to entertain, engage, and above all, respect its listeners with a quality and variety of programming found nowhere else". It is also the primary station of the nationally syndicated WFMT Radio Network and a jazz network available to other public radio stations around the U.S.

As of September 2026, hosts on WFMT include Candice Agree (who became Lead Host in the summer of 2026), Lisa Flynn (who served as Lead Host for several years before stepping away from that role in the summer of 2026), Jan Weller, Kristina Lynn, Robbie Ellis, Kerry Frumkin, David Schwan, and Peter Van de Graaff.

Weeknights, Exploring Music (formerly titled Exploring Music with Bill McGlaughlin) is heard. Weekly broadcasts include the Chicago Symphony Orchestra, New York Philharmonic, San Francisco Symphony Orchestra and Metropolitan Opera. Weekends feature shows on baroque music, folk music, Latin American classical music, and chamber music. The syndicated weekly show With Heart and Voice airs Sunday mornings. On Saturday at twelve o'clock they have an opera.

Programs can be heard through its satellite services and online via several streaming services. WFMT is the only individual radio station that is an associate member of the European Broadcasting Union.

== History ==
=== WOAK ===
The station signed on the air on May 16, 1948. It originally held the call sign WOAK. The studios were in the Guyon Hotel and it operated at 98.3 MHz with an effective radiated power (ERP) of only 770 watts. The station was owned by Gale Broadcasting Company.

By 1950, the station's frequency had been changed to 105.9 MHz, and its ERP was increased to 9,300 watts. WOAK generally aired pop music, but also featured classical music programs and dramas. The number of Chicago radio stations that aired classical music programs was small, but none compared to WFMT.

=== WFMT ===
In 1951, the station's call sign was changed to WFMT. Bernard and Rita Jacobs launched WFMT's classical music/fine arts radio format on December 13, 1951. They began with 8-hour-a-day broadcasts, with Bernard serving as the station's engineer, and Rita as the station's announcer. In 1952, WFMT began publishing a biweekly program guide, which later became Chicago magazine. In 1953, programming was expanded to 18 hours per day.

In 1954, WFMT's studios and transmitter were moved to the LaSalle-Wacker Building, increasing its HAAT to 547 feet. The station's ERP was also increased and its frequency was changed to the present-day 98.7 MHz. In 1956, WFMT aired a live recording of a folk concert with Pete Seeger and Big Bill Broonzy at Northwestern University.

=== WTTW ownership ===
In 1968, WFMT began around-the-clock broadcasting. That same year, Bernard Jacobs sold WFMT to WGN-TV's Continental Broadcasting Company for $810,000, which in turn donated the station to WTTW two years later.

In 1969, the station's transmitter was moved to the Prudential Building, and in 1971 its transmitter was moved to the John Hancock Center.

Several classical music stations were found on the FM dial in Chicago in the 1950s, 1960s, 1970s and 1980s. They included WEFM 99.5, WXFM 105.9, WFMQ 107.5, WJJD at 104.3 and WNIB 97.1. They all changed formats by 2001. While WFMT was a station supported by the sales of commercials, it aired no pre-recorded (by non-station hosts) advertising. A brief attempt at introducing pre-recorded commercial advertising in the early 1990s, the only time in its history, proved unpopular with listeners. All advertising on the station would be read exclusively by WFMT's on-air hosts.

=== Fine Arts Network ===
In 1976, WFMT created the Fine Arts Network for broadcast syndication of the Chicago Symphony Orchestra and the Lyric Opera. In 1979, WFMT became America's first radio superstation, delivered by satellite and cable systems across the United States and dozens of countries, including the Soviet Union and China.

In August 1976, the FCC granted WFMT temporary authority to simulcast on AM 1450, using the former facilities of WVON, which had moved its call sign and programming to another frequency the previous year. The simulcast continued until 1979, when Midway Broadcasting and Migala Enterprises were granted licenses to share time on the frequency.

In June 1980, WFMT became the first U.S. radio station to join the European Broadcasting Union. A live performance of the Chicago Symphony Orchestra was heard in the US, United Kingdom, France, Belgium, Switzerland, Italy, Sweden, and West Germany simultaneously. Richard Wagner's Der Ring des Nibelungen was broadcast live for the first time as a digital transatlantic performance from the Bayreuth Festspielhaus to the US and Canada in 1983.

=== Beethoven Network ===
In 1986, WFMT launched the Beethoven Satellite Network, a satellite delivered classical music programming service. It allows public radio stations to broadcast classical music during some hours of the day or around the clock, even if their budgets don't allow for a local staff or music library.

=== 1991 to 2020 ===
The WFMT Fine Arts Circle, a member/listener support and funding group, was formed in 1991.

In 1995, the station moved to its current location in the WTTW complex in Chicago's Northwest Side. The new facility included an all-digital path from studios to transmitter. The WFMT Jazz Satellite Network debuted two years later.

In 2001, the station's transmitter was moved to the Sears Tower in downtown Chicago (now the Willis Tower).

WFMT celebrated its 50th anniversary on December 13, 2001, which Chicago Mayor Richard M. Daley declared WFMT Day.

In 2003, the station began syndication of the program "Exploring Music with Bill McGlaughlin", an informational weekday program on various themes in classical music. It was created by Steve Robinson and is now carried by over 50 stations in the U.S. and is heard by over 400,000 people each week. WFMT also launched a Fine Arts Hotline for the Chicago area that same year.

=== 2020s streamlining and staff and host firings and departures ===
Since at least 2024, parent company company Window to the World Communications Inc. has streamlined WFMT and fired staff and long-time radio hosts; programming and management structure has also been changed or reduced. Long-term radio hosts Dennis Moore and Bill McGlaughlin were dismissed, and other hosts have resigned or been replaced; the undiscussed changes in staffing and management style led to WFMT employees announcing an intent to unionize in March 2025.

== Awards and honors ==
In 1957, the station received an Alfred I. DuPont Award as the country's best broadcaster in the small-station category. WFMT also aired a discussion between Frank Lloyd Wright and Carl Sandburg, which was simulcast with WTTW, marking the first collaboration between WTTW and WFMT. Another collaboration occurred the following year, as the two stations began a pioneering stereo music project in which WTTW broadcast a left audio channel, and WFMT broadcast the right audio channel simultaneously.

WFMT won another Alfred I. DuPont Award in 1960, this time as the country's best broadcaster in the large-station category. In 1961, the station won its first Peabody Award. Its ERP was increased to 120,000 watts the same year. In 1962, WFMT began broadcasting a majority of its programming in stereo. In 1964, Hi Fi/Stereo Review readers voted WFMT the best station in Chicago in terms of audio quality. The station's first series of Chicago Symphony Orchestra concerts began in 1965.

WFMT has won numerous first place Major Armstrong awards for excellence and originality in radio broadcasting and special awards for engineering and technical achievement.

== Past hosts ==
Several noteworthy individuals have worked at WFMT in its history. Award-winning stage and film director, writer, and producer Mike Nichols, at the time a student at the University of Chicago, joined the station in 1951. Nichols started the folk music program The Midnight Special in 1953. In 1983, Rich Warren became a co-host of The Midnight Special, and later became its sole host in 1996. Rich Warren continued as host of The Midnight Special until 2020. The show still airs weekly on WFMT, with Marilyn Rea Beyer as the host.

Noted author and broadcaster Studs Terkel began a radio show on WFMT in 1952, remaining on the station until 1997. The station replays Terkel's noteworthy interviews on Friday nights.

Carl Grapentine, former weekday breakfast host on WFMT, has served as the voice of the university of Michigan Marching Band since 1972, and has doubled as the public-address announcer at Michigan Stadium since 2006. He retired from full-time presenting in July 2018 but still continues to contribute programming.

Two-time Peabody Award-winning audio dramatist Yuri Rasovsky, creator of the National Radio Theater of Chicago, began a decade-long association with WFMT in 1975. He is still heard periodically on The Midnight Special in his classic "Chicago Language Tape" skit.

WFMT is noted for the longevity of various staff members. Norman Pellegrini joined the station as an announcer in 1952, and became program director in 1953, holding the position until disputes with the station owners forced him out in 1996. Ray Nordstrand was hired as an announcer, also in 1953. He later became the assistant of original owner Bernard Jacobs. Nordstrand moved up to the position of president and general manager in 1970. After suffering a heart attack in 1993, Nordstrand worked as a part-time consultant to the station. Don Tait, who had been called a "a seminal figure in the history of WFMT", worked as a host from June 1972, until his retirement in October 2007. His interest in archival recordings of conductors such as Willem Mengelberg, Bruno Walter, and Leopold Stokowski was often reflected in his programming. Among the programs he hosted were Collector's Item and Chicago Symphony Retrospective.

Another key contributor to WFMT's success was Associate Program Director Lois Baum. Arriving at the station from KPFK in California in July 1964, Baum produced and oversaw the production of countless spoken arts programs and features. She produced the Critic's Choice series, regular broadcasts of reviews and commentary by artist Harry Bouras (whose name was the inspiration for the playful Chicago art group, the "Hairy Who"), theater critic Claudia Cassidy, and journalist and author Herman Kogan. Baum selected and programmed plays and readings produced by the BBC and by the National Radio Theater of Chicago, and created The Storytellers, a program devoted to short stories. With co-producer George Drury, she created Word of Mouth, a spoken arts program that presented a mixture of rare archival recordings and new studio recordings of poets, novelists, philosophers, scientists, actors and musicians. In addition to her extensive work with spoken arts programs, from 1972 until 2009, Lois Baum co-hosted with Norman Pellegrini nationally syndicated broadcasts from the Lyric Opera of Chicago.

In August 2000, Steve Robinson was hired as general manager of WFMT. He had worked in classical music radio since 1967, and retired in 2016.

== Technological achievements ==
Since going on the air in 1951, WFMT has garnered a strong reputation for technological innovation and sound quality.

In 1958, WFMT and public television station WTTW collaborated on a pioneering stereo music project in which WTTW broadcast a left audio channel, and WFMT broadcast the right audio channel simultaneously. (FM stereo broadcasting was not yet available).

WFMT broadcast a live concert in 1971, using Dolby noise reduction, the first station to do so. In 1974, it broadcast for the first time in four-channel (quadrophonic) sound, a live performance of the Chicago Lyric Opera's presentation of Rossini's Semiramide.

In 1978, WFMT participated in the first stereo relay of a live performance via satellite, from the San Francisco Opera.

In 1979, WFMT was one of the first local FM stations to re-broadcast its programming via satellite. This feed was received by cable companies (who transmitted WFMT's programming to their subscribers), as well as by home TVRO users.

In 1982, WFMT moved into the digital era, being chosen by Sony and Philips to be the first station in the world to broadcast music from the compact disc format, thanks to the station's reputation for high audio standards. The station broadcast material from Digital Audio Tape for the first time in 1987, and was once again chosen by Sony to broadcast from a MiniDisc in 1992, to demonstrate the subtle differences between an MD and a CD. WFMT also broadcasts in HD.
