= Toyin Spellman-Diaz =

American oboist

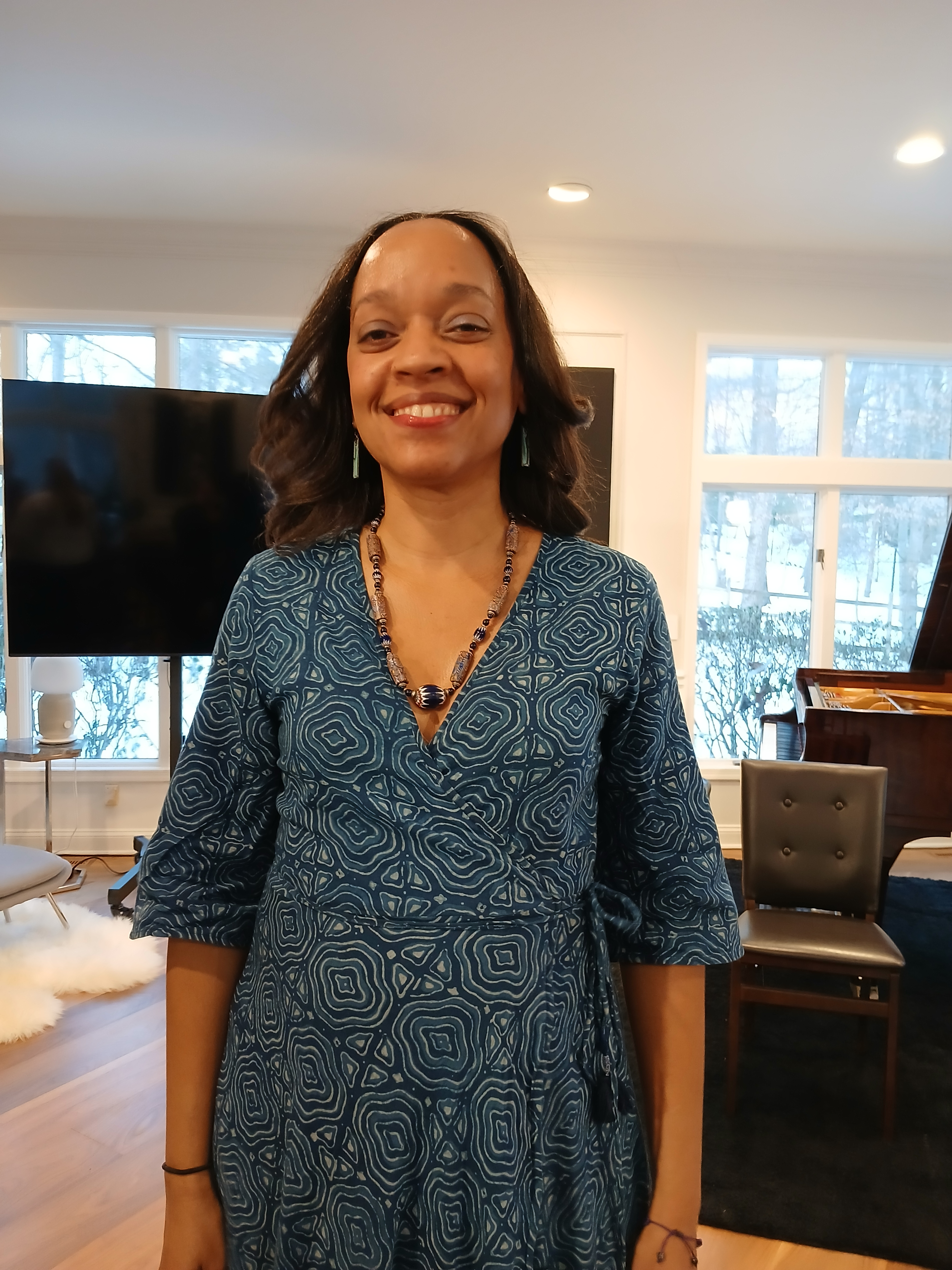
Spellman-Diaz in January 2025.jpg

Toyin Spellman-Diaz is an American oboist. She grew up in Washington, D.C. where she found a love for classical music through her parents' immense record collection. Spellman-Diaz is known for her significant solo work and orchestra career, as well as her career in chamber music with the group Imani Winds. Spellman-Diaz is active in working to diversify the classical music world especially in the wind quintet and orchestral space.

== Early life and education ==
Spellman-Diaz grew up in Washington, DC. She attended Oberlin Conservatory of music where she attained a Bachelors of Music. She additionally attended Manhattan School of Music where she earned both a Masters Degree and a Professional Studies Degree.

== Solo career ==
Spellman-Diaz has performed with the New York Philharmonic, Chicago Symphony, Chicago Civic Orchestra, Milwaukee Symphony, American Symphony Orchestra, Orpheus Chamber Orchestra, and the Orchestra of St. Lukes. In addition, Spellman-Diaz has been a soloist with the Chicago Civic Orchestra, Manhattan Virtuosi, as well as with the Kennedy Center Youth Orchestra.

== Achievements ==
- Grammy for Best Classical Compendium, Imani Winds, Passion For Bach And Coltrane
- Soloist, Chicago Civic Orchestra
- Soloist, Manhattan Virtuosi
- Soloist, Kennedy Center Youth Orchestra

== Imani Winds ==
Spellman-Diaz has been a member of the Imani Winds since its founding in 1997. The Imani Winds are an American wind quartet based in New York. The group has three Grammy Award nominations and one win. The group is dedicated to diversifying the wind quintet through representation in players and composers. The group has commissioned many pieces by composers chosen for their unique life experience that lend themself to composing on historical and contemporary societal conditions.
