= Exploring Music =

- Genre: Classical music education
- Running time: 60 minutes, daily
- Country of origin: United States
- Home station: WFMT
- Syndicates: 55+ NPR and other public radio stations via Public Radio Exchange
- Hosted by: Bill McGlaughlin (2003–2026); Peter Van de Graaff (2026–)
- Created by: Steve Robinson; Bill McGlaughlin
- Written by: Bill McGlaughlin
- Produced by: Cydne Gillard; Noel Morris; Jesse McQuarters
- Executive producer: Steve Robinson
- Recording studio: WQXR New York City (2003–2026); WFMT Chicago (2026–)
- Original release: 2003 – present
- No. of series: 170+
- No. of episodes: 850+
- Opening theme: Exploring Music by Bill McGlaughlin
- Website: exploringmusic.wfmt.com

Exploring Music is an internationally syndicated radio program featuring classical music, with commentary and analysis by host Bill McGlaughlin. It is a daily, one-hour show with a single in-depth theme each week. The show, which debuted in 2003, is produced by WFMT Radio Network. Exploring Music is in many ways the heir to the late Karl Haas' popular long-running show, Adventures in Good Music, expanded and updated for a 21st-century audience.

As of 2013, Exploring Music airs on 55 U.S. radio stations and has over 400,000 live listeners weekly. In Australia, Exploring Music airs on ArtSound FM in Canberra at 9 AM, 3MBS at 9 AM, and on 4MBS at 7 PM.

Host Bill McGlaughlin was let go from Exploring Music at the end of 2025, in the midst of multiple host shake-ups at WFMT. The program's host for new episodes is Peter Van de Graaff.

== Program description ==
Exploring Music delves into a wide variety of topics in classical music, and each five-program, one-week series has a single theme. Weekly themes have included weeklong studies of the music of dozens of composers, explorations of various cultures, styles, forms, and time periods, and dozens of other topics and areas of exploration.

A very small sampling of weekly topics includes such themes as:

- Wagner's Ring Cycle
- Piano Concertos
- Music Inspired by Love
- How Do We Get from Bach to Beethoven?
- Variations
- Music of Spain
- Music Critics
- La Belle Epoque
- Old Wine in New Bottles
- Families of Instruments
- Beethoven and that Danged Metronome
- String Quartets
- All in the Family: Musician Relatives
- Shakespeare and Music
- The Mighty Handful
- Requiem Masses
- Tone Poems
- Literature Inspired by Classical Music

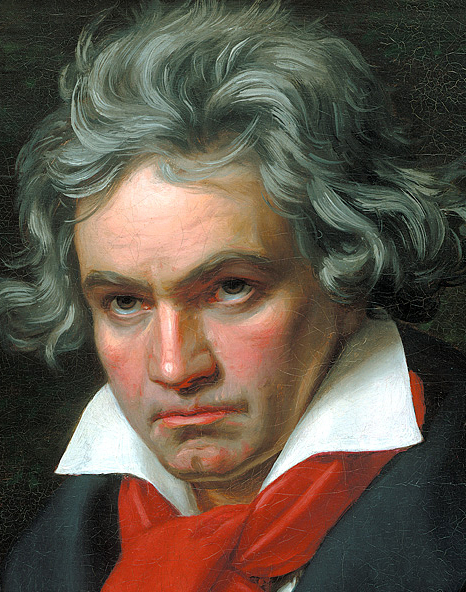
Beethoven themes have included: Late Beethoven, Beethoven and the Piano, Beethoven Quartets, and Beethoven and that Danged Metronome.

Over two dozen classical composers — e.g. Schumann, Bartók, Grieg, Debussy, Vaughan Williams, Stravinsky, and Bernstein — have also had weekly themes devoted exclusively to their lives and music. These programs are intimate biographies which include the composer's early life, education, historical and musical influences, personal life, and emotional and musical development, plus numerous musical pieces each day. Several composers, including Schubert, Brahms, Tchaikovsky, Mahler, Verdi, and Shostakovich, have had a two-week theme devoted to their lives and works. Bach, Mozart, and Beethoven have each had several series centered around their works. Approximately one week per month is devoted to the life and works of a single composer.

Exploring Music is geared to all ages and to any level of musical knowledge. Host Bill McGlaughlin guides the listener into the music through various means: revealing the stories behind compositions, adding analysis and illustrations at the piano, exploring the interlocking nature of music and ideas, referencing the historical context of pieces and trends, and also giving his insight as a professional musician, conductor, and composer.

Each week McGlaughlin wove a deepening narrative around the topic at hand, and aimed to make exploring classical music fun. "Drawing people inside the music seems the clue to me," he stated. "Human beings are wired for delight when we figure something out." Occasionally music from other genres — such as jazz, ethnic/world music, folk/traditional music, or pop standards — is aired, to liven up the discussion and illustrate points.

The piano is another tool McGlaughlin frequently employed to get concepts across. Of his original decisions about the show's format, McGlaughlin said, "It's very hard to talk about music on the radio unless you can hear a sound, so I said I need a piano. Instead of saying 'a minor third,' I can play it. I wanted to make certain that what you could hear was prominent."

Following McGlaughlin's death in July 2026, WFMT veteran Peter van de Graaff hosts a new chapter of Exploring Music, which will also continue to feature encore episodes from founding host McGlaughlin in selected weeks.

== Inception and history ==
=== With Bill McGlaughlin ===
In 2002, Steve Robinson, Vice President of WFMT Radio Network, approached Peabody Award-winner Bill McGlaughlin to host a new daily radio show, which would showcase and explicate great works of classical music. McGlaughlin had spent 22 years as host and music director of Saint Paul Sunday, the nationally syndicated weekly chamber music performance and interview show. His credentials also included decades as a professional musician, conductor, and composer. Regarding his choice of McGlaughlin as host, Steve Robinson stated, "As far as I'm concerned, no one can top Bill in the way he conveys his passion for music on the radio."

Development of the new program was funded by a special grant from the National Endowment for the Arts, in November 2002. The show debuted nationally on October 6, 2003. Exploring Music in essence replaced Karl Haas' long-running show, Adventures in Good Music, since the aging and retired Haas had recorded no new episodes of his show after 2002. When encore broadcasts of Adventures in Good Music ceased entirely on June 29, 2007, Exploring Music gained an even wider national listenership, as it was then scheduled in the retired show's time slot on many radio stations.

In 2013, after repeated requests from listeners and following years of negotiation with recorded-music copyright lawyers, Exploring Music reached ground-breaking legal agreements which allowed it to stream any of its past shows on demand from its site; this feature was available through late 2019. Following the removal of this feature, the show's website allows free streaming of its past 10 episodes.

McGlaughlin was let go from Exploring Music at the end of 2025, in the midst of multiple host shake-ups at WFMT. McGlaughlin's last new series to air on the show, a planned two weeks dealing with the Belle Époque, was cut in half due to his dismissal. He was offered no feedback or rationale on the non-renewal of his annual contract, but stated in a message to radio stations, "Exploring Music gave me a wonderful chance to do what I love best – explore some of the greatest accomplishments of humanity in some depth." He died on July 21, 2026.

=== New host ===
Beginning the week of August 24, 2026, broadcaster, singer, and educator Peter Van de Graaff took over as the new host of Exploring Music.

== Popular and critical reception ==
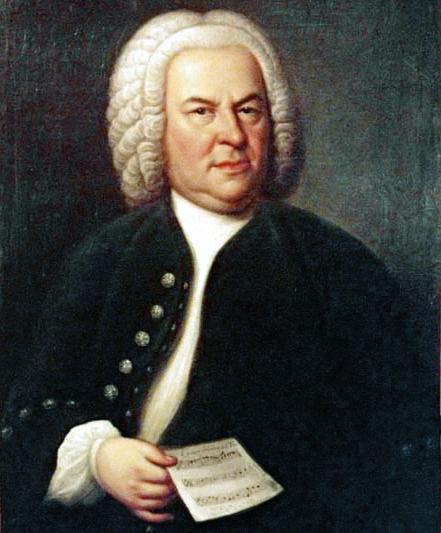
Exploring Music has delved into Bach's Secular Works, his B-Minor Mass, his St. Matthew Passion, and, in December, his Christmas Oratorio.

McGlaughlin's highly informed, yet relatable and enthusiastic presentation appealed to radio audiences of all ages, including younger listeners. According to Chicago Tribune music critic John von Rhein, "Bill McGlaughlin's folksy but informed manner as host of the popular radio series Exploring Music has pulled thousands of listeners into the classical experience." Executive Producer Steve Robinson reported in 2007:

The e-mail is always over the top. In my 40 years doing classical music radio I've never seen anything like it.... The letters range from a person who had never heard a string quartet before and wanted to know where to buy one, to a listener who graduated from Juilliard and found [Bill's] comments on Ravel to be enlightening!

As of 2013, Exploring Music had over 400,000 listeners to the live show.

=== Honors ===
Host and music director Bill McGlaughlin received the Lifetime Achievement Award in 2004 from Fine Arts Radio International, which stated that, "Exploring Music, with its weekly thematic concept, provides the classical radio listener with both in-depth education and compelling radio listening, a balance that is rarely achieved."

The show also garnered McGlaughlin and producer Steve Robinson the Dushkin Award from the Music Institute of Chicago, in 2008.

In 2011, in presenting McGlaughlin their Lifetime Achievement Award, the Association of Music Personnel in Public Radio noted that "Bill McGlaughlin's incredibly knowledgeable but always inviting and warm presence can ... be heard on Exploring Music, a daily program begun in 2002 in which he guides listeners to discover the heart, soul and humor of the music he plays."

== Production and distribution ==
Since McGlaughlin lived in New York City, and the WFMT production studio is in Chicago, production of Exploring Music occurred in two locations. After choosing a topic, McGlaughlin did extensive research at the Lincoln Center Library for the Performing Arts, and via his own resources such as the 30-volume Grove Dictionary of Music and Musicians. The Chicago producers collected 30 to 50 hours of relevant music selection samples, with their liner notes, from WFMT's extensive library in Chicago, and sent them to McGlaughlin — by making low-resolution MP3 files of them, burning them onto DVDs, and FedExing them. In New York, the team at radio station WQXR also combed their music library for more possibilities, and placed the audio into iTunes for McGlaughlin to review.

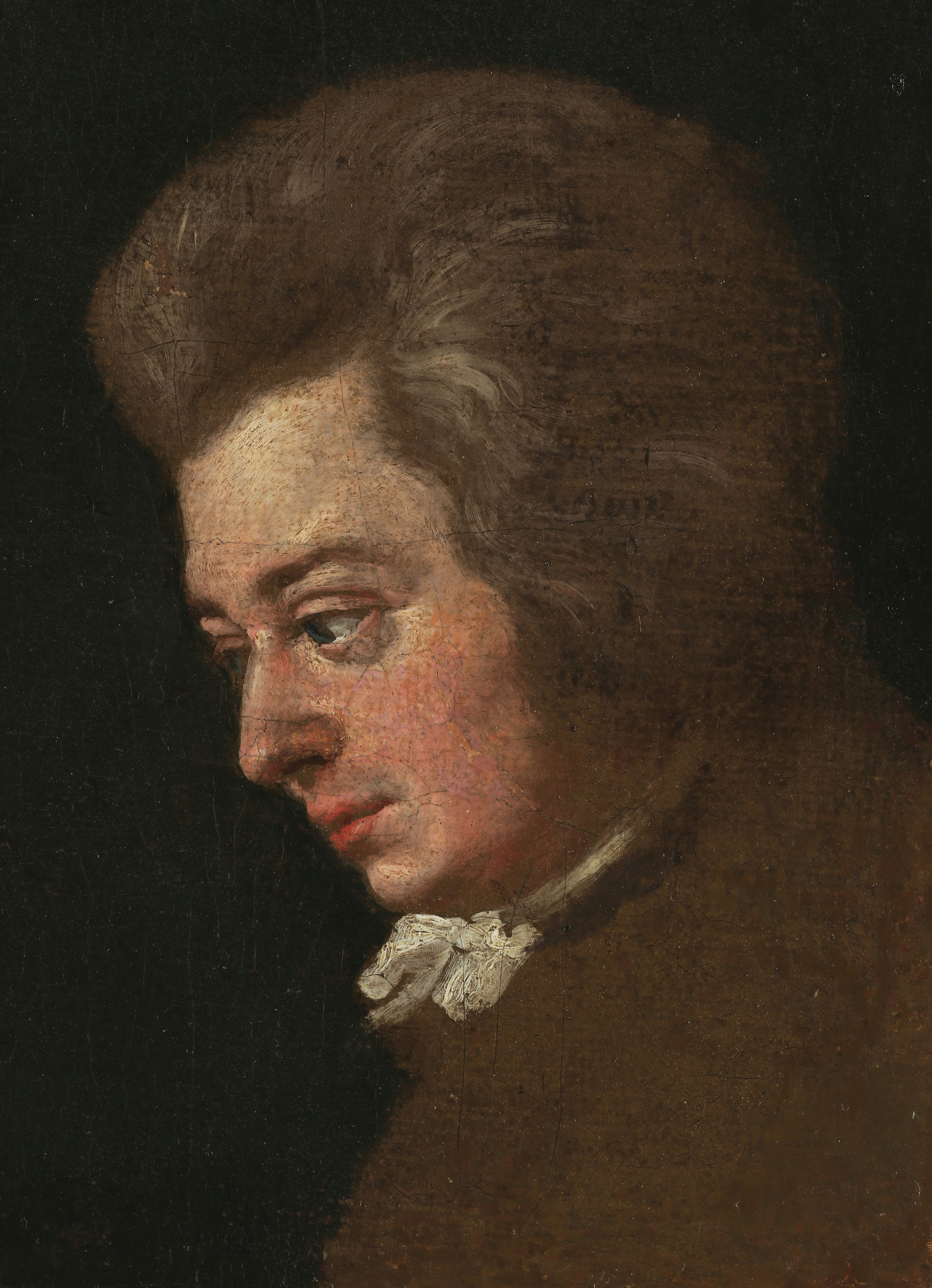
Mozart series: Mozart in Vienna, Mozart at his Zenith, Mozart's Piano Concertos, and Mozart's Birthday Bash.

After sorting through and choosing which music selections to present, and finalizing his research and ideas, McGlaughlin then recorded the voice-track portion of the week's five one-hour shows, in the studios of WQXR in New York. The recording session was monitored in real time in Chicago via either ISDN or telephone. This allowed McGlaughlin, his New York recording engineer, and the Chicago producers to interact freely, as if they were all in the same recording studio. McGlaughlin often voiced the same narration section multiple ways, attempting to find the most concise and entertaining way to present the information, which also gave the producers editing options when they finalized each show.

The voice-track audio files for the week's five shows were then sent to Chicago, where they were edited for time, and the high-resolution music selections are added in. This post-production process involved making artistic choices regarding which of McGlaughlin's narration samples to use, and how to present and place McGlaughlin's piano examples, snippet examples from CDs, and the musical pieces themselves. Choices were also made with timing in mind; extra movements or an extra unannounced musical snippet at the end of the show are added if a show runs short.

Once each program was completed, a CD was made and given to the WFMT uplink department. The show is then distributed to radio stations around the country three ways: Physical duplicates are made of the master CD and shipped and the show is uploaded to the Public Radio Exchange (PRX) server for automatic internet distribution. Listeners nationwide and even worldwide are then able to hear Exploring Music, either broadcast on their local radio station, or via the internet through any one of over 30 online radio stations.

== Listening options ==
Exploring Music airs daily on 55 public and commercial radio stations in the U.S. In Australia, Exploring Music airs on 3MBS at 9 AM, and on 4MBS at 7 PM; in Guam it airs on KPRG at 10 AM.

From May 2013 through late 2019, Exploring Music offered the option to stream any of its past and current programs on demand on its website. The on-demand archive included a search function which could search for terms and names throughout all series and episodes, and also includes a feature which could separate the music from an episode from McGlaughlin's commentary and vice versa. Following the removal of this feature, the show's website allows free streaming of its past 10 episodes.

Playlists for every episode of Exploring Music since its inception have also been available on the program's official site.

I don't know any scientific proof that human beings must have music in their lives to flourish, but I've noticed that if we don't, there's an empty spot. With our programs we try each week to take you into a new area, and hope it's just that we'll find that hollow spot in all of us, and nourish it. And it's like having extra rooms in your house — wonderful rooms — and you let the light in, and you find you have new vistas you didn't imagine.

— Bill McGlaughlin, speaking about Exploring Music
