= Performance Today =

American classical music radio program

- Former logo for Performance Today
- Genre: Live concert selections worldwide
- Running time: 2 hours, daily
- Country of origin: United States
- Language: English
- Home station: American Public Media Saint Paul, MN
- Syndicates: 237 NPR stations
- Hosted by: Valerie Kahler
- Recording studio: APM studio at MPR
- Original release: 1987 – present
- Website: performancetoday.org

Performance Today is a classical music radio program, first aired in 1987 and currently hosted by Valerie Kahler. It is the most listened-to daily classical music radio program in the United States, with 1.2 million listeners on 237 stations. It builds its two-hour daily broadcast (some stations broadcast only one hour) from live concert performances from around the world. It airs from the American Public Media (APM) studios in Saint Paul, Minnesota, and frequently simulcasts special programs from festivals and public radio stations around the country.

The show also airs in-studio performances and interviews. Until October 2025, weekly features included the popular “Piano Puzzler” segment with composer Bruce Adolphe.

Through the PT Young Artist in Residence program, the show highlights young soloists from American conservatories who have the potential for great careers. Former Performance Today young artists include pianists Orli Shaham, Jeremy Denk, and Jonathan Biss, guitarist Jason Vieaux, and violinist Colin Jacobsen among many others.

== History ==
Performance Today was created by National Public Radio (NPR), and went on the air in 1987. The program was founded by NPR vice president for cultural programming Dean Boal, who gave Performance Today its name, and who, along with NPR colleagues Doug Bennet, Jane Couch, Ellen Boal, and retired Baldwin Piano Company president Lucien Wulsin, secured the series' initial funding. NPR produced and distributed the program from Washington, D.C. until 2007. For most of its first two years, under executive producer Wesley Horner and hosts Kathryn Loomans and Liane Hansen, it combined classical music with numerous and wide-ranging arts features. In 1989, the focus shifted exclusively to classical music.

Martin Goldsmith then hosted for nearly ten years; he left in October 1999. During Goldsmith's tenure as host the show grew from 40 stations to 230, with weekly listeners reaching 1.5 million. The show won a Peabody Award in 1998.

Fred Child served as the program's host from October 2000 until October 2025. In January 2007, American Public Media took over as the program's producer and distributor and moved the production to Saint Paul, Minnesota. In 2007, the show was awarded the Karl Haas Prize for Music Education by Fine Arts Radio International. In 2014, Performance Today won a Gabriel Award for artistic achievement.

On November 3, 2025, Valerie Kahler officially took over as the new host of Performance Today. Kahler had previously served as a frequent guest host on the program, as well as a host and producer for APM’s Classical 24.

== Young artists ==
Each year, Performance Today invites musicians from top American conservatories to visit the PT studios for a week-long residency. They join the program's hosts in the studio to play music, discuss their backgrounds, their ambitions, and what it means to be a musician.

Previous young artists have represented a variety of music schools including the New England Conservatory, the Curtis Institute of Music, the Jacobs School at Indiana University, the Shepherd School of Music at Rice University, and The Colburn School. Former Performance Today young artists include pianists Orli Shaham, Jeremy Denk, and Jonathan Biss, guitarist Jason Vieaux, and violinist Colin Jacobsen among many others.

== "Music is Music" ==
"Music is Music" is a Performance Today podcast featuring composers and musicians steeped in the classical tradition, but determined to carve out a home for new music in the twenty-first century. Each episode features artists talking about their craft, together with a sample of their work. Recent episodes include conversations with Julia Holter, the Spektral Quartet, Third Coast Percussion, and members of Wilco, Stereolab, and Helado Negro.

== "Piano Puzzler" ==
The "Piano Puzzler" was a weekly feature of Performance Today from 2002 to 2025. Premiering as the "Keyboard Conundrum" in the spring of 2002, then immediately renamed the "Piano Puzzler", the segment featured familiar tunes rewritten in the style of a classical composer by pianist Bruce Adolphe. Listeners would call in to the show and listen to the disguised piece, then with the help of Fred Child and hints from Bruce Adolphe, attempt to name both the hidden tune and the composer whose style Bruce was imitating. Three volumes of sheet music featuring Piano Puzzlers have been released. With the impending departure of Fred Child as Performance Today host, the "Piano Puzzler" was retired in October, 2025.

== "Classical Woman of the Year" ==
Since 2019 Performance Today has chosen a "Classical Woman of the Year", based on a poll of listeners. The awardees so far have been:

- Valerie Coleman, 2019, a founder of the Imani Wind Quintet and an active composer
- JoAnn Faletta, 2020, conductor of the Buffalo Philharmonic orchestra
- Marin Alsop, 2021, a major pioneer for women conductors and until recently conductor of the Baltimore Symphony Orchestra
- Lara Downes, 2022, a pianist and a force in the popularization of black American classical music
- Gabriela Montero, 2023, a pianist known for her improvisations
- Deborah Borda, 2024, a music executive (former President and CEO of the New York Philharmonic and the Los Angeles Philharmonic)
- Jessie Montgomery, 2025, a violinist, composer, chamber musician, and music educator

== See also ==
- Fred Child
- American Public Media
