= David Shifrin =

American classical clarinetist (born 1950)

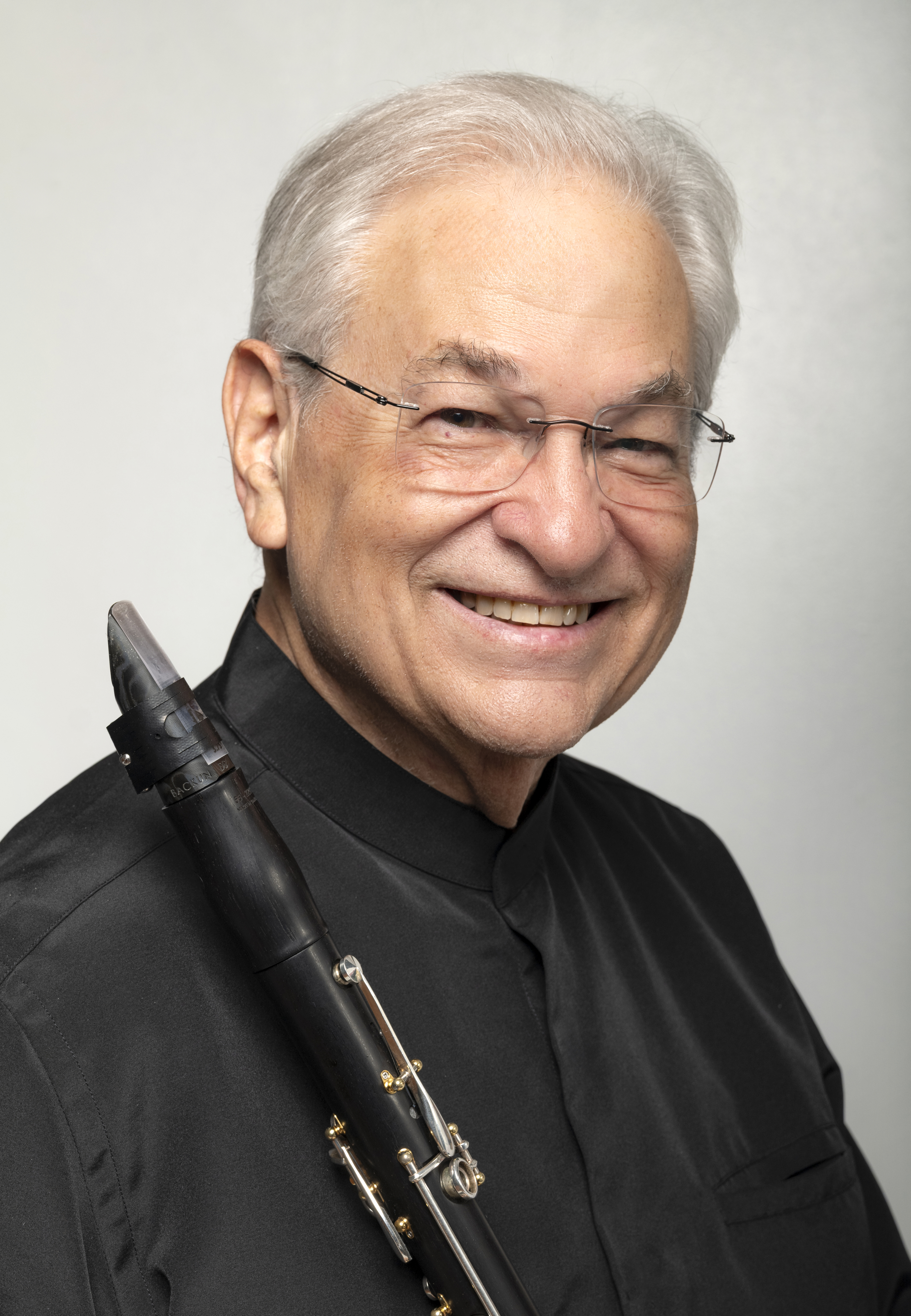
- Portrait, 2025.

Background information
- Born: January 2, 1950 (age 76); Queens, New York, U.S.
- Occupations: Clarinetist, artistic director, professor of clarinet
- Labels: Delos Productions; Deutsche Grammophon; Sony Classical Records; Angel/EMI; BMG; Arabesque Records; CRI
- Website: www.davidshifrin.com

David Shifrin (born January 2, 1950) is an American classical clarinetist and artistic director.

== Biography ==
David Shifrin received early musical training at the Interlochen Arts Academy in 1963. He attended the Music Academy of the West summer conservatory in 1968 and later graduated from the Curtis Institute of Music in Philadelphia in 1971, where he studied with Anthony Gigliotti.

Shifrin has appeared as a concerto soloist with many major orchestras around the world, including the Philadelphia Orchestra, Minnesota Orchestra, Dallas Symphony Orchestra, Seattle Symphony, Houston Symphony, Milwaukee Symphony Orchestra, Detroit Symphony Orchestra, Fort Worth Symphony Orchestra, Hawaii Symphony and the Phoenix Symphony in the United States, and internationally with orchestras in Italy, Switzerland, Germany, Japan, Korea and Taiwan. Shifrin commissioned and premiered a concerto by Pulitzer Prize winning composer Stephen Albert with the Philadelphia Orchestra during its 1991–1992 season, and in 1995 he premiered Ezra Laderman's Concerto for Clarinet and Strings with the Fort Worth Symphony Orchestra.

In 1984, Shifrin commissioned the construction of a special elongated clarinet, the basset clarinet, to enable the playing of Mozart's Clarinet Concerto and Clarinet Quintet in their original form. Shifrin's 1985 recording of the Mozart Clarinet Concerto and Quintet with Gerard Schwarz and the Mostly Mozart Festival Orchestra was named "Record of the Year" by Stereo Review magazine.

Shifrin has also received critical acclaim as a recitalist, performing at such venues as Alice Tully Hall, Zankel Hall at Carnegie Hall and the 92nd Street Y in New York City, as well as at the Library of Congress in Washington, D.C. A much sought after chamber musician, he has collaborated frequently with such distinguished ensembles and artists as the Tokyo String Quartet, the Emerson String Quartet, Wynton Marsalis, and pianists Emanuel Ax and André Watts.

An artist member of the Chamber Music Society of Lincoln Center since 1989, David Shifrin served as its artistic director from 1992 to 2004. He has toured extensively throughout the United States with CMSLC and hosted and performed in several nationally televised broadcasts on PBS’s Live from Lincoln Center. He has been the artistic director of Chamber Music Northwest in Portland, Oregon since 1981, and is also the artistic director of the Phoenix Chamber Music Festival.

Shifrin has served as Principal Clarinetist with the Cleveland Orchestra, American Symphony Orchestra (under the direction of Leopold Stokowski), Honolulu Symphony, Dallas Symphony Orchestra, Los Angeles Chamber Orchestra and the New York Chamber Symphony.

Shifrin joined the faculty of the Yale School of Music in 1987 and was appointed artistic director of the Chamber Music Society of Yale and Yale's annual concert series at Carnegie Hall in September 2008. He has also served on the faculties of The Juilliard School, University of Southern California, University of Michigan, Cleveland Institute of Music and the University of Hawaii. In 2007 he was awarded an honorary professorship at China's Central Conservatory of Music in Beijing.

David Shifrin has been instrumental in broadening the repertoire for clarinet and orchestra by commissioning and championing the works of 20th- and 21st-century American composers including John Adams, Joan Tower, Stephen Albert, Bruce Adolphe, Ezra Laderman, Lalo Schifrin, David Schiff, John Corigliano, Bright Sheng and Ellen Taaffe Zwilich. In 2020, he premiered a new clarinet concerto that he commissioned from David Ludwig at Chamber Music Northwest in Portland.

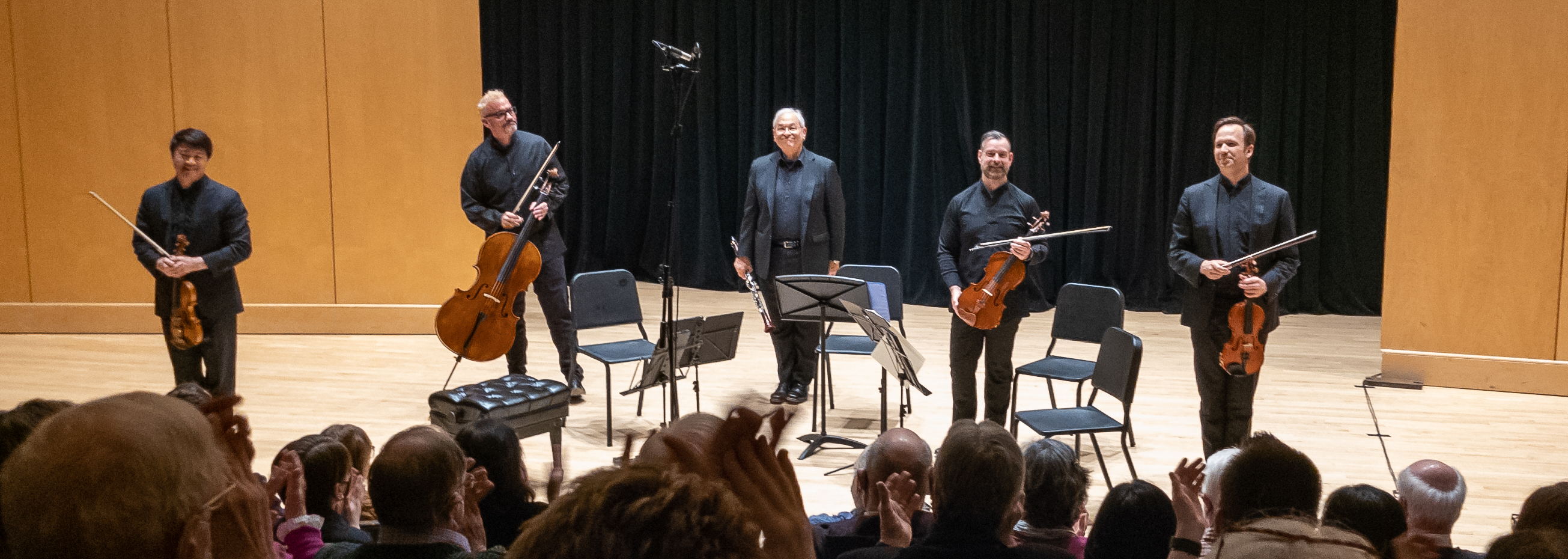
Shifrin (center) with the Miró Quartet at the University of Maine, 2022

== Awards ==
David Shifrin was awarded the Avery Fisher Prize by Lincoln Center in 2000 for recognition of outstanding achievement and excellence in music, and today is one of only three wind players to have received the prize since its inception in 1974. Shifrin is also the recipient of a Solo Recitalists' Fellowship from the National Endowment for the Arts, an Avery Fisher Career Grant and the 2016 Concert Artists Guild Virtuoso Award. He was given an honorary membership by the International Clarinet Society in 2014 in recognition of lifetime achievement, and at the outset of his career he won the top prize at both Munich's ARD International Music Competition and the Geneva International Music Competition. In January 2018 he received the 2018 Richard J. Bogomolny National Service Award at the Chamber Music America National Conference, an award which recognizes an individual or entity who has provided historic service to the small ensemble music field. In 2019, Shifrin received the Chamber Music Society of Lincoln Center's Award for Extraordinary Service to Chamber Music.

== Recordings ==
Shifrin's recordings on the Delos, Deutsche Grammophon, Angel/EMI, Arabesque, BMG, Sony Classical Records and CRI labels have consistently garnered praise and awards. In addition to his "Record of the Year" accolade from Stereo Review for his 1985 Mozart album, Shifrin has received Grammy Award nominations for three different recordings:

- The Collected Chamber Music of Claude Debussy, with the Chamber Music Society of Lincoln Center (2002)
- Copland's Clarinet Concerto, with Gerard Schwarz and New York Chamber Symphony (1989)
- Ravel's Introduction and Allegro, with Nancy Allen, Ransom Wilson and the Tokyo String Quartet (1990)

Shifrin's recordings of the Copland Clarinet Concerto and Leonard Bernstein's Clarinet Sonata have been released on iTunes via Angel/EMI and Deutsche Grammophon. His most recent recordings include the Beethoven, Bruch and Brahms Clarinet Trios with cellist David Finckel and pianist Wu Han (pianist) on the ArtistLed label; and a recording for Delos of works by Carl Nielsen, which includes the first commercial recording of the Nielsen Clarinet Concerto arranged for chamber orchestra, as well as Nielsen's Wind Quintet and various short works either written or arranged for clarinet and piano. In the fall of 2018, Delos released a recording of three clarinet quintets written for Shifrin by Peter Schickele, Richard Danielpour and Aaron J. Kernis, and performed by Shifrin and the Miró, Dover and Jasper Quartets. Another Delos release from 2019 features Shifrin with the Dover and Harlem Quartets in music by Duke Ellington (arranged by David Schiff), Valerie Coleman and Chris Rogerson. An album of the chamber music of Francis Poulenc is forthcoming.
