= Laura Anne Bossert =

American violinist (born 1968)

Laura Anne Bossert (born 24 April 1968) is a violinist, violist, and pedagogue. She is a current faculty member at the Longy School of Music of Bard College and Wellesley College and, during the summer, the Castleman Quartet Program. She is co-director and founder of LyricaFest in Lincoln, Massachusetts.

== Early life ==
Bossert was born in Chatham Township, New Jersey to pianist Mariel Bossert and attorney Walter Bossert, and grew up with siblings Ellen Bossert and William Standish Bossert. She began violin study at age 5 with the encouragement of her mother. In elementary school, Bossert studied with New Jersey local violin teacher Virginia Howe. Growing up, she was a frequenter of Camp Point Counterpoint, where she was mentored by Edwin Finckel (father of David Finckel). She first attended the Castleman Quartet Program as a participant at age 17.

== Performing career ==
Bossert attended the Eastman School of Music for both her undergraduate and graduate work, earning her master's degree in Violin Performance in 1992. During her time at Eastman, she was both pupil and teaching assistant to Charles Castleman. Also in 1992, Bossert tied for the bronze medal in the First International Henryk Szeryng Violin Competition. Between 1994 and 1997 she held associate concertmaster, guest concertmaster, and concertmaster positions in orchestras including the Tucson Symphony Orchestra, Lubbock Symphony Orchestra, Oklahoma City Philharmonic, and Intermountain Chamber Orchestra. In 1990, Bossert premiered Lalo Schifrin's Double Concerto for Cello and Violin with cellist Terry King and the Lubbock Symphony Orchestra. While concertmaster of the Lubbock Symphony in 1997, she played the violin solos in Rimsky-Korsakov's Sheherazade. Bossert has also appeared as a soloist with the Boston Virtuosi and the Kalistos Chamber Orchestra. An experienced chamber musician, Bossert has performed with musical notables such as Elmar Oliveira, Joseph Silverstein, Victor Rosenbaum, Tchaikovsky Gold Medalist Sergey Antonov and Robert Merfeld. Through Lyrica Chamber Music, founded by her pianist mother in 1987, she collaborated with Paul Neubauer, David Jolley, and Joseph Robinson.

Bossert has undertaken several projects coupling traditional classical repertoire with film or narration. Most recently, she performed movements of Beethoven's String Quintet in C Major Op. 29 with Charlie Chaplin's film The Immigrant at Bemis Hall in Lincoln, Massachusetts.
