= Canellakis =

Canellakis, Kanellakis, Κανελλάκης is a Greek surname. Notable people with the surname include:

- Karina Canellakis (born 1981), American conductor and violinist
- Nicholas Canellakis (born 1984), American cellist
- Paris Kanellakis (1953 – 1995), Greek American computer scientist
