= Wu Han (pianist) =

Background information
- Born: February 19, 1959 (age 67)
- Origin: Taipei, Taiwan
- Genre: Classical
- Occupations: Pianist, arts administrator
- Instrument: Piano
- Label: ArtistLed
- Website: www.davidfinckelandwuhan.com

Wu Han (Chinese: 吳菡; pinyin: Wú Hàn), born February 19, 1959) is a Taiwanese-American pianist, recording artist, artistic director and arts administrator. She is the co-artistic director of the Chamber Music Society of Lincoln Center, the artistic director of the La Musica International Chamber Music Festival in Sarasota, fasten, and co-artistic director of South Mountain Concerts in Massachusetts. She is also an artistic advisor to The Society of the Four Arts in Palm Beach and artistic advisor to the Musicians Advocacy Fund, a nonprofit organization supporting musicians and arts organizations. She performs as a concert pianist and has made numerous recordings, and in 1997 co-founded ArtistLed, a classical music label.

== Early life and education ==
Wu Han began studying music in Taipei, Taiwan at the age of 9, including piano, viola, and percussion. By age 12, Wu Han was performing in concerts and competitions, and within a few years, she had earned first prizes in all of Taiwan's major competitions. In 1981, she traveled to the United States at the invitation of The Hartt School in Connecticut to study viola and piano. Wu Han studied with Raymond Hanson, Rudolf Serkin, Herbert Stessin, Lillian Kallir, and Menahem Pressler and attended the Marlboro Music School and Festival and the Aspen Music Festival.

== Career ==
Wu Han has performed at major concert venues including Carnegie Hall, Lincoln Center, the Kennedy Center, Wigmore Hall in London and the Berliner Philharmonie. She collaborates with ensembles including the Borromeo String Quartet, Emerson String Quartet, Escher String Quartet, and St. Lawrence Quartet. Her concerto appearances have included appearances with the Philadelphia Orchestra, Atlanta Symphony Orchestra, and Aspen Chamber Symphony.

=== Partnership with David Finckel ===
Wu Han has a longstanding artistic partnership with cellist David Finckel spanning several decades. The two married in 1985. As a piano-cello duo, they have performed throughout the United States, Europe, and Asia. In 2012, Wu Han and Finckel were named Musicians of the Year by Musical America.

Their chamber music repertoire encompasses works from the Classical and Romantic periods through 20th- and 21st-century compositions, including works by Bruce Adolphe, Lera Auerbach, Gabriella Lena Frank, Pierre Jalbert, Augusta Read Thomas, and George Tsontakis. Several contemporary works have been written for or dedicated to Wu Han and Finckel; works by some of these composers are featured on ArtistLed's For David and Wu Han album. Their collaborative work has also extended to larger chamber ensembles, including trio performances with violinist Philip Setzer and clarinetist David Shifrin, as well as a piano quartet with violinist Daniel Hope and violist Paul Neubauer.

==== The Chamber Music Society of Lincoln Center ====
In 2004, Wu Han and cellist David Finckel were appointed co-artistic directors of the Chamber Music Society of Lincoln Center in New York City, the world’s largest chamber music producers and presenters. They oversee the organization’s concert programming, education initiatives, and recording and broadcast activities. In May 2026, CMS announced that Wu Han and Finckel had renewed their contracts as co-artistic directors through 2032.

During their tenure, CMS expanded its programming through national and international touring, annual residencies and chamber music series outside New York City, partnerships with venues around the country, and commissioning and co-commissioning many new works. CMS performances are distributed through WFMT Radio Networks. Wu Han and Finckel have also overseen CMS's Bowers Program, which provides young chamber musicians with performance and professional-development opportunities.

==== Music@Menlo Festival ====
In 2003, Wu Han co-founded Music@Menlo, a chamber music festival in Atherton, California, with cellist David Finckel. She and Finckel served as the festival's artistic directors for 24 seasons, overseeing its artistic and educational programming. The festival presents concerts, lectures, training programs for emerging and pre-professional musicians, and master classes open to the public. Alumni of the Chamber Music Institute program have established chamber music organizations around the world. The Music@Menlo Live recording series documents performances. The festival also operates an Arts Management Internship Program.

In 2026 Wu Han and David Finckel became Music@Menlo's Artistic Directors Laureate.

== ArtistLed ==
The label was established to give Wu Han and Finckel greater control over their recordings including their choice of repertoire, production, editing and distribution.

Its catalog includes recordings of cello-and-piano repertoire by composers including Ludwig van Beethoven, Edvard Grieg, Robert Schumann, Frédéric Chopin, Sergei Rachmaninoff, Dmitri Shostakovich, and Sergei Prokofiev, as well as recordings featuring other composers and chamber musicians. Its most recent release was 2026's Beethoven: The Six Piano Trios with Wu Han on piano and Finckel on cello with violinists Chad Hoopes, Danbi Um, Arnaud Sussmann, Kristin Lee, Paul Huang, and Benjamin Beilman.

== Other artistic leadership roles ==
Wu Han is an artistic advisor to the Musicians Advocacy Fund, a nonprofit organization that supports musicians and arts organizations.

In 2022, she was appointed artistic director of La Musica, a chamber music festival in Sarasota, Florida. She is involved in shaping the festival’s artistic programming and presenting chamber music performances.

In 2021, Wu Han became Artistic Advisor for Classical Music at the Society of the Four Arts in Palm Beach, Florida, a nonprofit organization founded in 1936 that presents cultural programs. She curates chamber music programming for the organization.

The Wolf Trap Foundation for the Performing Arts appointed Wu Han as the Artistic Advisor for Chamber Music at The Barns in 2018, a role she held through its 2024–25 season.

She was also a member of the artist faculty of the Aspen Music Festival and School. In 2013, she and David Finckel established The Finckel-Wu Han Chamber Music Studio, a two-week summer program at Aspen for aspiring professional musicians.

== Media and broadcasts ==
Wu Han has been featured or reviewed in publications including The Washington Post, The New York Times,, BBC Music Magazine, The Mercury News, Musical America Worldwide, Palo Alto Online, San Francisco Classical Voice, The Strad, The Wall Street Journal, Music Matters, and The Violin Channel.

She has appeared on television and radio programs including Articulate with Jim Cotter and PBS' Live from Lincoln Center and been a guest on American Public Media’s Performance Today, Saint Paul Sunday, and WETA Radio.

== Discography ==
- Sonatas by Grieg, Schumann, and Chopin (1997)
- Sonatas by Strauss, Franck, and Finckel (1997)
- Sonatas by Tchaikovsky and Kodály with Da-Hong Seetoo and David Finckel (1997)
- Beethoven: Complete Works for Piano & Cello (1998)
- Russian Classics (2001)
- Edwin Finckel: Music For Cello (2001)
- Schubert Sonatas (2004)
- Brahms Sonatas (2005)
- CMS Studio Recordings: Elgar and Walton (2007)
- CMS Studio Recordings: Beethoven and Dvořák (2007)
- DG Concerts: Bartok/Dvořák (2007)
- Russian Recital (featuring solo piano works by Tchaikovsky, Rachmaninov, and Skryabin) (2007)
- Schubert Piano Trios with Philip Setzer and David Finckel (2008)
- Derek Han plays Mozart, with Wu Han, Peter Asimov, and the Royal Philharmonic Orchestra (2008)
- For David and Wu Han (contemporary works composed for David Finckel and Wu Han) (2009)
- Clarinet Trios with David Shifrin and David Finckel (2011)
- Mendelssohn: The Piano Trios with Philip Setzer and David Finckel (2011)
- Dvorak Piano Trios with Philip Setzer and David Finckel (2012)
- Wu Han LIVE (2014)
- Romantic Piano Quartets (Brahms, Schumann, Mahler) on Deutsche Grammophon with Daniel Hope, Paul Neubauer, and Wu Han (2015)
- Wu Han LIVE II (2016)
- Bach, Mendelssohn, Debussy, Britten (2018)
- Wu Han LIVE III (2019)
- Winterreise (2020)
- Beethoven: The Six Piano Trios (2026)
