= Bruce Adolphe =

American classical composer (born 1955)

Bruce Adolphe (born May 31, 1955) is a composer, music scholar, the author of several books on music, and pianist. He is currently Resident Lecturer and Director of Family Concerts of the Chamber Music Society of Lincoln Center, where he has been a key figure since 1992. From 2002 to 2025, Adolphe performed his weekly "Piano Puzzler" segment on the nationally broadcast Performance Today classical music radio program hosted by Fred Child. The program is also available as a podcast and from iTunes. Mr. Adolphe was also founding artistic director of Off the Hook Arts Festival, an interdisciplinary festival combining music, science, and visual arts, based in Fort Collins, Colorado, from 2010 to 2022.

Adolphe's recent books include Visions and Decisions: Imagination and Technique in Music Composition published in 2023 by Cambridge University Press in the Elements series on Imagination and Creativity, edited by Anna Abraham. In 2021, Oxford University Press published an expanded third edition of Adolphe's book The Mind's Ear:Exercises for Improving the Musical Imagination for Composers, Performers, and Listeners. Adolphe contributed a chapter to The Routledge Companion to Music and Human Rights, published in 2023 and he contributed a chapter to the OUP publication Secrets of Creativity: What Neuroscience, the Arts, and Our Minds Reveal, 2019, edited by Nalbantian and Matthews.

== Biography ==
Adolphe earned a Bachelor of Music and a Master's of Music from Juilliard in 1976. In 1974, he wrote music for playwright Paul Corrigan's Nancy's Tragic Period and Tan My Hide, which were performed together at La MaMa Experimental Theatre Club in the East Village of Manhattan in May 1974.

Adolphe has composed music for Yo-Yo Ma, Itzhak Perlman, Joshua Bell, Daniel Hope, Carlo Grante, Sylvia McNair, the Beaux Arts Trio, the Brentano String Quartet, the Miami Quartet, the National Symphony Orchestra, the Orpheus Chamber Orchestra, the Chicago Chamber Musicians, the Chamber Music Society of Lincoln Center, and many other performers and organizations.

Composed in memory of his brother, visual artist Jonathan Adolphe (1952-2022), Bruce Adolphe's "Memory Believes (a requiem)", was performed by the Brentano String Quartet and the Antioch Chamber Ensemble (choir), presented by the Parlance Chamber Concerts.

In 2009, Adolphe's one-act opera Let Freedom Sing: The Story of Marian Anderson, with a libretto by Carolivia Herron, premiered at the Atlas Theater in Washington, D.C. The opera was premiered by the Washington National Opera and the Washington Performing Arts Society, who commissioned the piece. The opera was performed in 2023 by Mobile Opera in Alabama under the direction of Scott Wright.

Also in 2009, Adolphe's "Violin Concerto" was premiered by violinist Eugene Drucker with the Idyllwild Academy Orchestra and conducted by Peter Askim at the Redcat Theater of Disney Hall in Los Angeles.

"Music Is", for children's chorus and youth orchestra, premiered as part of the celebration of the 25th anniversary of the Thurnauer School of Music in June 2009, with the Young People's Chorus of New York City and the Thurnauer Orchestra.

Also in 2009, an evening of Adolphe's chamber music was presented at The Kennedy Center.

On May 3, 2009, Yo-Yo Ma played the world premiere of Adolphe's "Self Comes to Mind", a neuroscience-inspired work for solo cello with two percussionists. The percussion parts were performed by John Ferrari and Ayano Kataoka. "Self Comes to Mind" was a collaboration with neuroscientist Antonio Damasio, who wrote a text in poetic form about the evolution of consciousness for the piece. The premiere took place at the American Museum of Natural History in New York City, and featured live interactive images that responded to the music. The images were based primarily on brain scans created by Hanna Damasio, Antonio Damasio's wife and collaborator. The Damasios are the founders and co-directors of the Brain and Creativity Institute in Los Angeles and have invited Adolphe to be composer-in-residence there. Prior to his collaboration with Damasio on "Self Comes to Mind", Adolphe composed two other works based on passages in Damasio's book Descartes' Error, titled "Memories of a Possible Future" (for piano and string quartet) and "Body Loops" (for piano and orchestra).

Adolphe's cantata on themes of social justice, civil rights, and freedom around the world, titled "Reach Out, Raise Hope, Change Society", was commissioned to celebrate the 90th anniversary of the School of Social Work of the University of Michigan. It premiered with the Chamber Chorus and musicians from the university's School of Music, conducted by Jerry Blackstone, in November 2011.

The film Einstein's Light, a documentary about Albert Einstein by Nickolas Barris, was scheduled to be released in 2015 in celebration of the 100th anniversary of Einstein's theory of general relativity but the film was withdrawn by the filmmaker. However, the soundtrack is still available as a on all digital platforms, and features violinist Joshua Bell and pianist Marija Stroke, released by Sony Classical in December 2015.

In 2015, Adolphe's violin concerto "I Will Not Remain Silent", inspired by the life of Joachim Prinz, received its world premiere with the IRIS Orchestra conducted by Michael Stern and Sharon Roffman as soloist. The concerto was then performed in Lucerne at KKL by violinist Ilya Gringolts with the Human Rights Orchestra of Europe, conducted by Alessio Allegrini. The concerto was again performed by Daniel Hope with the Los Angeles Chamber Orchestra, conducted by Jeffrey Kahane, in January 2017. Daniel Hope performed the concerto again in 2018 in Essen, Germany, with Jaime Martin conducting the Essen Philharmonie. Scott St. John performed the concerto with Guillermo Figueroa conducting the Santa Fe Symphony in 2019. In 2021, The Milken Archive of Jewish Music released the album I Will Not Remain Silent, including an interview with Bruce Adolphe about the work.

Adolphe's "Piano Concerto" premiered in July 2016 with the Philharmonia Zürich conducted by Fabio Luisi with piano soloist Carlo Grante. Grante then commissioned two piano works from Mr. Adolphe: "Chopin Dreams" and "Seven Thoughts Considered as Music", both of which Grante recorded for Naxos American Masters series and released in November 2017.

In 2019, Adolphe's "I saw how fragile and infinitely precious the world is" for mezzo-soprano, cello, and recorded sounds from space (provided by NASA) and planet Earth was recorded by mezzo-soprano Theodora Hanslowe and cellist Sophie Shao and later premiered (in live performance) by mezzo-soprano Kady Evanyshyn and Ms. Shao. The latter duo also performed the work at NASA Goddard Space Center in March, 2019, at a colloquium honoring the late scientists and astronaut Piers Sellers. The title of the piece is a quote of Piers Sellers, said looking back at Earth from the space station.

Adolphe is also known for his compositions for young listeners. These works are created primarily for The Learning Maestros, Adolphe's education company, which he co-founded with Julian Fifer, an impresario best known as founder and executive director of the Orpheus Chamber Orchestra. His compositions for young listeners are often interdisciplinary, combining music with science, literature, history, visual arts, and current events. Adolphe's pieces for the Learning Maestros include:

- Tyrannosaurus Sue: A Cretaceous Concerto, premiered by Chicago Chamber Musicians in 2000 at the Field Museum of Natural History (unveiling of the T-rex "Sue")
- Red Dogs and Pink Skies: A Musical Celebration of Paul Gauguin, created to accompany an exhibition at the Metropolitan Museum of Art
- Witches, Wizards, Spells, and Elves: The Magic of Shakespeare, premiered by Chicago Shakespeare Theater actors with the Chicago Chamber Musicians
- Tough Turkey in the Big City, a Thanksgiving comedy with script by Louise Gikow, featuring a bass trombone as the turkey; premiered at Chamber Music Northwest in Oregon and at the Chamber Music Society of Lincoln Center
- The Girl Who Loved Wild Horses, based on the story by Paul Goble. Commissioned by Boston Musica Viva.
- Zephyronia, a piece about the power of wind energy, created with writer Louise Gikow for the Imani Winds, who perform the music (for wind quintet) and act the parts of the characters in the story.

Adolphe's music has also been recorded on Naxos, Sony Classical, CRI, PollyRhythm, New World, Koch, Music@Menlo archives, Delos, Soundbrush, and other record labels. His film scores include the documentary permanently on display in the United States Holocaust Memorial Museum in Washington, D.C.

== Books ==
- "Visions and Decisions: Imagination and Technique in Music Composition", Cambridge University Press, Elements in Imagination and Creativity series, 2023
- The Mind's Ear: Exercises for Improving the Musical Imagination for Performers, Composers, and Listeners, Oxford University Press (3rd edition published 2021)
- What To Listen for in the World, Hal Leonard
- Of Mozart, Parrots and Cherry Blossoms in the Wind: A Composer Explores Mysteries of the Musical Mind, Hal Leonard
- Secrets of Creativity, Oxford University Press, an anthology of writings on the creative process and the neuroscience of creativity, edited by Suzanne Nalbantian. Adolphe's chapter is "The Musical Imagination: Mystery and Method in Musical Composition". Published in 2019.
- "The Routledge Companion to Music and Human Rights", chapter called "The Sound of Human Rights: Wordless Music that Speaks for Humanity" Routledge, 2022

== Selected works ==
- 2019: "Coiled" for string quartet, based on Beethoven's Opus 95, first movement. Commissioned by the Brentano String Quartet.
- 2019: "The King, the Cat, and the Fiddle" for solo violin, 2nd violin, viola, cello, bass, piano, and narrator. Commissioned by Daniel Hope. Text from the story by Yehudi Menuhin and Christopher Hope.
- 2019: "The Nightingale" for solo violin and narrator (one person); commissioned by Daniel Hope. (Text by the composer, based on the story by Hans Christian Andersen, updated to include a robotic bird.)
- 2019: "I Too Bleed and Hope for Beauty" A tribute to the life of Alma Rose, violinist and conductor of the Women’s Orchestra, Auschwitz; for chamber orchestra. Commissioned by the River Oaks Chamber Orchestra, Houston. Premiere on November 15, 2019, in conjunction with the re-opening of the renovated Holocaust Museum of Houston.
- 2017: "Out of the Air" for clarinet, cello, and piano; commissioned by Ocean Reef Chamber Music Festival; premiered by Anne-Marie McDermott (pno), Todd Palmer (clar), Keith Robinson (vc), Ocean Reef, Fl.
- 2014: "Chopin Dreams" for solo piano; commissioned by Concert Artists' Promotion Trust for Carlo Grante; premiered in Alice Tully Hall at Lincoln Center for the Performing Arts; European premiere in the Brahms-saal of the Musikverein in Vienna (2015); recording for Naxos American Masters series released in 2016/2017
- 2015: Einstein's Light music for a documentary by Nickolas Barris; soundtrack featuring Joshua Bell and Marija Stroke (piano); released on Sony Classical Records
- 2014: "Musics of Memory" for piano, marimba, harp, guitar; based on Antonio Damasio's work
- 2014: "Piano Concerto" premiered July 10, 2016, with Fabio Luisi conducting the Philharmonia Zurich and Carlo Grante as piano soloist
- 2014: "I Will Not Remain Silent" for violin and orchestra; inspired by the life of Joachim Prinz
- 2011: "Reach Out, Raise Hope, Change Society" for SATB chorus, wind quintet, 3 percussionists; with text about social justice, civil rights, freedom
- 2009: "Self Comes to Mind" for cello and 2 percussionists; with text by Antonio Damasio and images based on brain scans by Hanna Damasio
- 2009: Let Freedom Sing: The Story of Marian Anderson one-act opera with libretto by Carolivia Herron
- 2004: "Da Boo" for soprano and marimba
- 2004: "The Tiger's Ear: Listening to Abstract Expressionist Paintings" for flute, oboe, violin, viola, cello, piano
- 2005: "Violin Concerto"
- 1998: "Whispers of Mortality: String Quartet No. 4" (1998)
- 2005: "Three Secret Stories" for violin and piano (2005)
- 1998: "Couple" for cello and piano (1998)
- 2007: "Wind Across the Sky: Settings of Native American Poetry" for soprano and piano trio
- 1999: "A Thousand Years of Love" for soprano and piano
- 2005: "Songs of Life and Love" setting of poems by Iranian, Palestinian, and Israeli women
- 1994: "Memories of a Possible Future" for string quartet and piano
- 2003: "Red Dogs and Pink Skies: A Musical Celebration of Paul Gauguin" for flute, clarinet, violin, cello, bass, percussion; with slides and optional narration
- 2000: "Tyrannosaurus Sue: A Cretaceous Concerto" for 13 musicians and narrator
- 2005: "Witches, Wizards, Spells, and Elves: The Magic of Shakespeare" for actors and 13 musicians
- 1982: "Mikhoels the Wise" opera in two acts about Solomon Mikhoels; libretto by Mel Gordon
- 2004: "Tough Turkey in the Big City" for bass trombone, trumpet, clarinet, violin, piano, percussion, and actor
- 1983: "The False Messiah" opera in two acts, libretto by Mel Gordon
- 1994: "The Amazing Adventure of Alvin Allegretto" comic opera for children in one act, libretto by Sara Schlessinger
- 1992: "Marita and Her Heart's Desire" for 12 instruments and narrator; fairy tale with story by Louise Gikow
- 1990: "Out of the Whirlwind" for mezzo-soprano, tenor, and large concert band; text by victims and survivors of the Holocaust
- 1985: "Ladino Songs of Love and Suffering" for soprano, horn, and guitar
- 1986: "Night Journey for Wind Quintet"
- "And All is Always Now" for violin and piano
- "The Bitter, Sour, Salt Suite" for solo violin with narrator; poems by Louise Gikow
