= Judith Blegen & Frederica von Stade: Songs, Arias & Duets =

Songs, Arias & Duets
- Columbia LP, M-33307

Studio album by Judith Blegen and Frederica von Stade
- Released: 1975
- Studio: CBS 30th Street Studio, New York City
- Genre: Classical vocal
- Length: 42:18
- Language: French, German and Italian
- Label: Columbia
- Producer: Thomas Frost

Judith Blegen & Frederica von Stade: Songs, Arias & Duets is a 42-minute studio album of art songs, art duets and operatic arias performed by Blegen and von Stade with members of the Chamber Music Society of Lincoln Center. It was released in 1975.

== Background and recording ==
The album was recorded using analogue technology on 18–19 November 1974 and 31 January 1975 at the CBS 30th Street Studio, New York City. It was taped after a performance of its programme in concert in Alice Tully Hall.

== Cover art ==
The cover of the album was designed by Albert Maggiore, and features a photograph taken by Don Hunstein at the Marriott Essex House, New York City.

== Critical reception ==
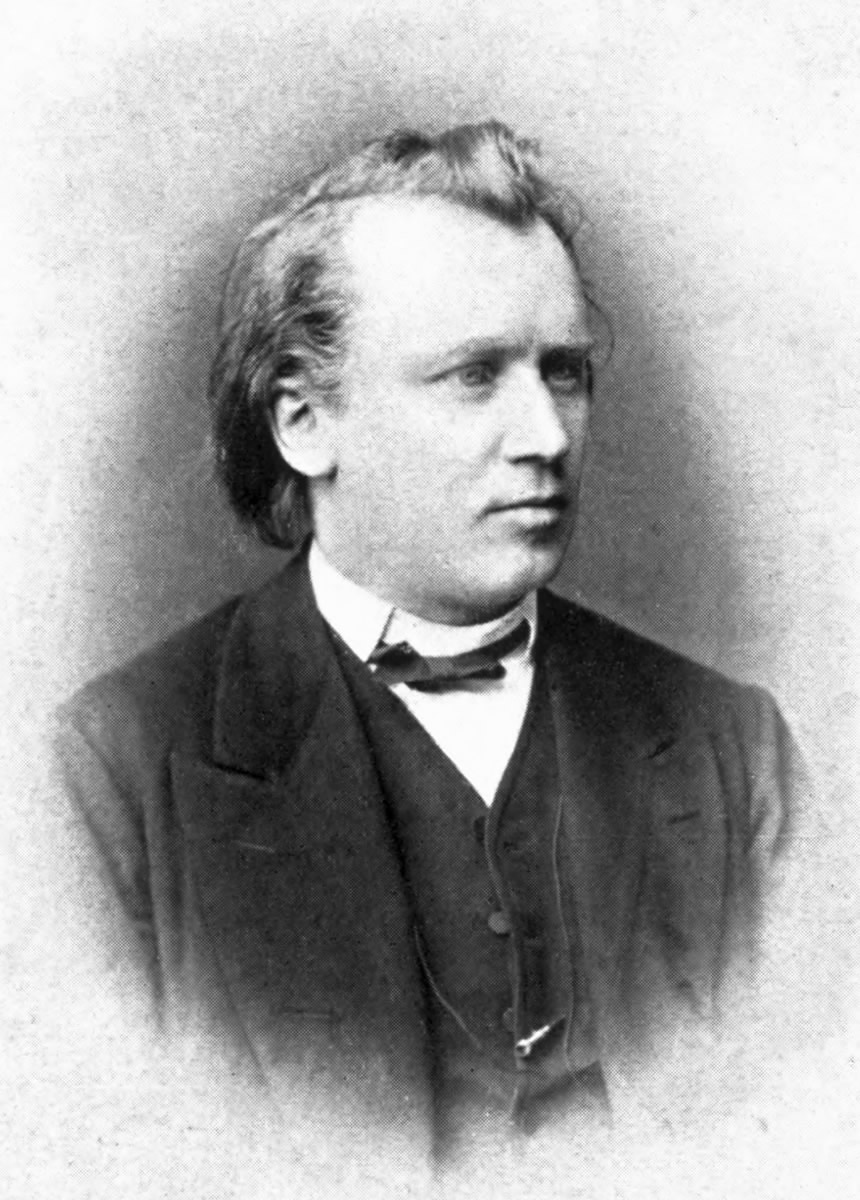
Johannes Brahms, circa 1872

George Jellinek reviewed the album on LP in Stereo Review in July 1975. The Chamber Music Society of Lincoln Center, he wrote, was usually inventive in the concerts that it mounted. Columbia's LP exemplified the kind of programme that the Society offered.

There was a vivacious aria by Alessandro Scarlatti with a trumpet obbligato, an aria by Saint-Saëns in which a violin figured prominently and a song by Schubert in which the singer was accompanied by a clarinet. There was also a novelty in the form of Cherubino's "Non so più" adapted by Mozart himself for voice, violin and piano (presumably for the use of amateur musicians in their drawing rooms).

Judith Blegen and Frederica von Stade were "attractive vocalists individually and in tandem; everything they do is charming, disarming and heartwarming". Their accomplished hosts included the clarinetist Gervase de Peyer, the trumpeter Gerard Schwarz and the violinist Joe del Maria, with the Society's director, Charles Wadsworth, fulfilling duties at the keyboard. The disc presented very good performances with very good audio quality, but was perhaps not the most nourishing fare ever put before collectors - less a square meal than a tray of delectable patisserie.

Alan Blyth reviewed the album on LP in Gramophone in February 1976. There were evenings, he wrote, on which eminent vocalists were invited to join the Chamber Music Society of Lincoln Center for one of its concerts in Alice Tully Hall. Columbia's disc was the fruit of one such occasion.

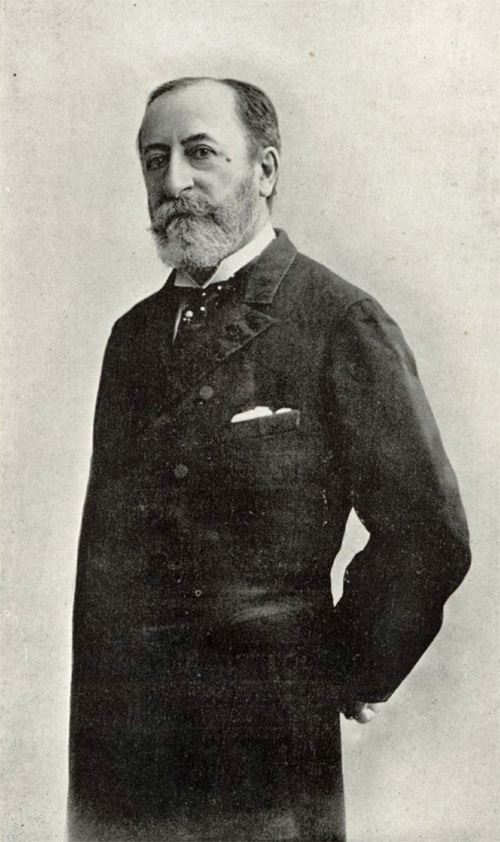
Camille Saint-Saëns, circa 1880

Judith Blegen and Frederica von Stade, "two of America's brightest singing talents", offered an eclectic programme of music that was mostly some distance from the mainstream. Only one item was very familiar, Mozart's "Non so più", and even that was performed in a version seldom encountered - an arrangement for violin and piano accompaniment that had been written by Mozart himself. Sung by von Stade, it evoked happy memories of the "youthful, palpitating Cherubino" that she had recently brought to the summer festivals at Glyndebourne and Salzburg.

Von Stade's timbre and interpretations were reminiscent of Christa Ludwig's. Chausson's sensual "Chanson perpétuelle", though, would probably not have figured in a Ludwig recital. Von Stade sang it with "dark, smouldering tone so right for its fin de siècle eroticism".

Judith Blegen's solo selections were just as enjoyable as her friend's. In "Ja, wir schwören", a number from Schubert's 1823 singspiel Die Verschworenen with a clarinet obbligato, she found an atypical darkness in her voice to convey the music's typically Schubertian yearning. Her performance of Saint-Saëns's "Le bonheur est chose legère", an aria in which "the vocal line is in an attractively sinuous vein with a violin solo", made one wonder whether he might not be a better composer than critics currently judged him to be.

The album's duets, by Brahms and Schumann, were a variegated mixture. Blegen's and von Stade's voices combined very nicely in them, and it was plain that the singers had been meticulous in their rehearsals: their phrasing was never spoiled by interpretative clashes. They were as adept in handling German as they were in French or Italian.

The instrumentalists were worthy partners of their guests, Gervase de Peyer and Gerard Schwarz deserving special praise for their contributions with clarinet and trumpet. All in all, the album was "wholly delightful". Every bar of Blegen's and von Stade's singing exhibited "intense and enthusiastic musicality". Apart from an insert on which texts were poorly laid out and marred by typographic errors, the LP's only fault was a stingily short running time.

William S. Burroughs reviewed the album in Esquire, praising it as "a permanent record of the most exciting concert I heard this year". Records in Review judged it "thoroughly delightful", and Time called it "distinguished". It was also reviewed in High Fidelity, Musikrevy, The New Records, Opera and Tribuna Musical.

== CD track listing ==
Robert Schumann (1810–1856)

- 1 (5:02) Spanisches Liederspiel, Op. 74 (1849): No. 8, "Botschaft"; with a traditional text, translated by Emanuel Geibel (1815–1884); Judith Blegen, Frederica von Stade and Charles Wadsworth (piano)
- 2 (0:51) Liederalbum für die Jugend, Op. 79 (1849): No. 15, "Das Glück"; with a text by Christian Friedrich Hebbel (1813–1863); Judith Blegen, Frederica von Stade and Charles Wadsworth (piano)

Ernest Chausson (1855–1899)

- 3 (8:25) "Chanson perpétuelle"; with a text by Charles Cros (1842–1888); Frederica von Stade, Charles Wadsworth (piano), Joe del Maria (violin), Ani Kavafian (violin), Ida Kavafian (viola) and Laurence Lesser (cello)

Franz Schubert (1797–1828)

- 4 (3:25) "Ich schleiche bang und still herum" from Die Verschworenen (D. 787, 1823), with a libretto by Ignaz Franz Castelli (1780–1862), after Lisistrata, ou Les Athéniennes (1802) by François-Benoît Hoffman (1760–1828), after Lysistrata (411 BC) by Aristophanes (circa 446 BC-circa 386 BC); Judith Blegen, Charles Wadsworth (piano) and Gervase de Peyer (clarinet)

Alessandro Scarlatti (1660–1725)

- 5 (3:03) "Se geloso è il mio core" from Endimione e Cintia; Judith Blegen, Charles Wadsworth (harpsichord), Ani Kavafian (violin), Daniel Phillips (violin), Carol Webb (violin), Richard Sortomme (violin), Jeffrey Solow (cello), Alvin Brehm (bass), Loren Glickman (bassoon) and Gerard Schwarz (trumpet)

Wolfgang Amadeus Mozart (1756–1791)

- 6 (3:02) "Non so più" from Le nozze di Figaro (K. 492, Vienna, 1786), with a libretto by Lorenzo da Ponte (1749–1838), after La folle journée, ou le Mariage de Figaro ("The mad day, or The marriage of Figaro", 1784) by Pierre Beaumarchais (1732–1799); Frederica von Stade, Charles Wadsworth (piano) and Joe del Maria (violin)

Camille Saint-Saëns (1835–1921)

- 7 (3:53) "Le bonheur est chose légère" from Le timbre d'argent ("The silver bell", completed 1865, premiered in Paris, 1877); with a libretto by Jules Barbier (1825–1901) and Michel Carré (1821–1872); Judith Blegen, Charles Wadsworth (piano) and Joe del Maria (violin)

Johannes Brahms (1833–1897)

- 8 (2:08) Five duets, Op. 66 (1873–1875): No. 2, "Klänge II"; with a text by Klaus Groth; Judith Blegen, Frederica von Stade and Charles Wadsworth (piano)
- 9 (1:54) Four duets, Op. 61 (1852–1874): No. 2, "Klosterfräulein"; with a text by Justinus Kerner (1786–1862); Judith Blegen, Frederica von Stade and Charles Wadsworth (piano)
- 10 (1:54) Four duets, Op. 61: No. 3, "Phänomenon"; with a text by Johann Wolfgang von Goethe (1749–1832); Judith Blegen, Frederica von Stade and Charles Wadsworth (piano)
- 11 (2:15) Three duets, Op. 20 (1858–1860): No. 1, "Weg der Liebe"; with a traditional text, translated by Johann Gottfried Herder (1744–1803); Judith Blegen, Frederica von Stade and Charles Wadsworth (piano)
- 12 (4:52) Three duets, Op. 20: No. 2, "Weg der Liebe"; with a traditional text, translated by Johann Gottfried Herder; Judith Blegen, Frederica von Stade and Charles Wadsworth (piano)
- 13 (1:33) Four ballades and romances, Op. 75 (1877–1878): No. 4, "Walpurgisnacht"; with a text by Willibald Alexis (1798–1871); Judith Blegen, Frederica von Stade and Charles Wadsworth (piano)

== Personnel ==
=== Musical ===
- Judith Blegen (b. 1943), soprano
- Frederica von Stade (b. 1945), mezzo-soprano
- Charles Wadsworth, piano and harpsichord
- Jaime Laredo (b. 1941), credited as Joe del Maria, violin
- Ani Kavafian (b. 1948), violin
- Daniel Phillips, violin
- Carol Webb, violin
- Richard Sortomme, violin
- Ida Kavafian (b. 1952), viola
- Laurence Lesser, cello
- Jeffrey Solow, cello
- Alvin Brehm, bass
- Loren Glickman, bassoon
- Gervase de Peyer (1926–2017), clarinet
- Gerard Schwarz (b. 1947), trumpet

=== Other ===
- Thomas Frost, producer
- Bud Graham, engineer
- Raymond Moore, engineer

== Release history ==
On 1 March 1975, Columbia released the album on LP (catalogue numbers 76476 in Europe, M-33307 in the US,), with notes by Robert Jacobson and an insert with texts and translations. Columbia also issued the album on cassette (catalogue number 40–76476 in Europe).

In 2012, Newton Classics issued the album on CD (with a 16-page booklet featuring a biography of von Stade by David Patrick Stearns) in their 4-CD collection Frederica von Stade: Duets, Arias, Scenes & Songs (catalogue number 8802125). In 2016, Sony issued the album on CD (in a miniature cardboard replica of the sleeve of the original LP) with a 52-page booklet in their 18-CD collection Frederica von Stade: The Complete Columbia Recital Albums (catalogue number 88875183412).
