= LyricaFest =

LyricaFest is an annual chamber music festival held in Lincoln, Massachusetts. This festival is part of Lyrica Boston Inc., a 501 (c)(3) not-for profit educational and performance corporation. Lyricafest was founded in 2000 by violinist/violist Laura Bossert and cellist Terry King. Every year 35 participants from conservatories and colleges throughout the United States and abroad, come together for a two-week workshop. The faculty includes Laura Bossert, Terry King and violinist/violist Paula Majerfeld. Lyricafest was featured in a documentary in 2009, The Sound of Character, produced by HawkFinn Production.

== Guest artists ==
LyricaFest welcomes guest artists every year to give chamber coachings and masterclasses, previous guest artists have been Roger Tapping, William Preucil, Natasha Brofsky, Joseph Kalichstein, Lawrence Dutton, Pamela Frank, Laura Goldberg, Martin Perry.

== Notable alumni ==
Neave Piano Trio, Hausmann Quartet, Alturas Duo, A Far Cry, Vox 4 String Quartet, Ashley Vandiver, Andrew Eng, Russell Wilson, Min-Jeong Koh, Jeremy Harmen, and John Richards.
