= Paul Watkins (musician) =

Welsh cellist and conductor (b. 1970)

Paul Watkins (born 1970) is a Welsh classical cellist and conductor. His brother is the composer Huw Watkins. Watkins studied cello with William Pleeth, Melissa Phelps and Johannes Goritzki. In 1988, he won the BBC Young Musician of the Year in the string section. From 1990 to 1997, he was principal cellist of the BBC Symphony Orchestra.

Watkins joined the Emerson String Quartet in the 2013-14 season, replacing the departing cellist David Finckel. He was previously a cellist with the Nash Ensemble, with whom he has made several commercial recordings. He was the musician-in-residence at the 2005 Fishguard Festival.

Watkins has made five concerto appearances at The BBC Proms, including the 2007 First Night. In March 2006 he premiered a new concerto by Richard Rodney Bennett with the Philharmonia at South Bank Centre, recording it two months later. His commercial recordings include the first recording of the cello concerto of Cyril Scott.

Watkins developed an additional interest in conducting, and won first prize and audience prize at the 2002 Leeds Conductors' Competition. His first conducting appearance with the London Philharmonic Orchestra was in February 2006. As a conductor, he has recorded for the Warner Classics label. He became Associate Conductor of the English Chamber Orchestra (ECO) in the 2007-2008 season. In June 2009, the ECO named Paul Watkins its music director, effective with the 2009-2010 season, for an initial contract of 3 years. Watkins became principal guest conductor of the Ulster Orchestra from 2009-2012. He has also served as guest conductor of the CityMusic Cleveland chamber orchestra.

Watkins plays on a cello made by Domenico Montagnana and Matteo Goffriller, c 1730.

Preceded by Ralf Gothóni (Principal Conductor)	Music Director, English Chamber Orchestra; 2009-present	Succeeded by incumbent
