= Escher String Quartet =

American string quartet

The Escher String Quartet is an American string quartet based in New York City, where they serve as Artists of the Chamber Music Society of Lincoln Center. Their name derives from the Dutch artist M. C. Escher.

== Biography ==
The Escher Quartet was founded in 2005 in New York City, where its original members were studying at the Manhattan School of Music. The group tours the US as well as internationally and has performed in Europe, Australia, and China. Among the venues where the ensemble has performed are the Auditorium du Louvre in Paris, Kennedy Center in Washington DC, the Concertgebouw in Amsterdam, and Wigmore Hall in London.

The quartet served on the BBC Radio 3 New Generation Artists scheme from 2010 until 2012. They were also invited by Pinchas Zukerman to serve as Quartet in Residence at the Young Artists Programme at Canada's National Arts Centre and were invited by Itzhak Perlman to the Perlman Music Program on Shelter Island, New York. From 2007 until 2009, the quartet was in residence at Stony Brook University. Escher has been mentored by the Emerson String Quartet and has collaborated with artists that include Leon Fleischer, David Finckel, Wu Han, Benjamin Grosvenor, jazz vocalist Kurt Elling, and jazz saxophonist Joshua Redman

In 2013 the Escher Quartet was awarded the Lincoln Center's Avery Fisher Career Grant. In 2015 the quartet was awarded the Martin. E. Segal Award by Lincoln Center.

In 2023–2024 the Escher Quartet served as season artists for the Chamber Music Society of Lincoln Center.

== Members ==
- Adam Barnett-Hart, violin
- Brendan Speltz, violin
- Pierre Lapointe, viola
- Brook Speltz, cello

=== Former Members ===
- Aaron Boyd, violin

== Recordings ==
The Escher String Quartet is best known for its recordings of Alexander von Zemlinsky's complete string quartets. In 2015, the quartet began releasing recordings of Mendelssohn's complete string quartets on the BIS label.

- Music@Menlo: Bridging the Ages, Disc 5. 2008. Music@Menlo Live
- Amy Cheney Beach Piano Quintet / Alan Louis Smith Vignettes: Covered Wagon Woman. 2011. Chamber Music Society Studio Recordings
- Stony Brook Soundings, Vol. 1, 2011. Bridge Records
- Alexander Zemlinsky String Quartets, Vol. 1, 2013. Naxos
- Alexander Zemlinsky String Quartets, Vol. 2, 2014. Naxos
- Mendelssohn: String Quartets No. 1 in E Flat Major and No. 4 in E Minor, 2015. BIS
- Mendelssohn: String Quartets No. 2 in A Minor and No. 3 in D Major, 2015. BIS
- Mendelssohn: String Quartets No. 5 in E Flat Major and No. 6 in F Minor, 2016. BIS
- Dvořák: American Quartet; Tchaikovsky: Quartet No. 1; Borodin: Quartet No. 2, 2018. BIS
- Samuel Barber: String Quartet in B minor, Op.11; Charles Ives: String Quartet No. 1 (From the Salvation Army) and String Quartet No. 2, 2021. BIS
- Pierre Jalbert: String Quartet No. 4, Air in Motion, and String Quartet No. 6 (“Canticle”), 2023. Orchard Classics – with Carol Wincenc (flute)
- Pierre Jalbert: String Quartet No. 5 Terra Incognita, 2023. Orchard Classics
