= Michael Stephen Brown =

American pianist and composer (born 1987)

Michael Stephen Brown (born 1987 in Oceanside, NY) is an American classical pianist and composer.

== Biography ==
Brown is the recipient of the 2015 Avery Fisher Career Grant, 2018 Emerging Artist Award from Lincoln Center, and the 2010 Concert Artists Guild Competition. Brown has performed as soloist with the Seattle, Grand Rapids, North Carolina, Maryland and Albany symphony orchestras, and at Carnegie Hall, Caramoor, the Smithsonian, Alice Tully Hall, and the Gilmore Festival. He is an artist at the Chamber Music Society of Lincoln Center, and is a former member of CMS Two (now known as The Bowers Program). He regularly performs duo recitals with cellist Nicholas Canellakis. He has received commissions from many organizations and some of today’s leading artists, and recently toured his own Piano Concerto around the US and Poland with several orchestras.

Brown is also a composer and is the recipient of the 2018 Copland House Residency Award. He is a recipient of a 2025 MacDowell fellowship in music composition.

Brown is a graduate of the Juilliard School, where he studied piano with Jerome Lowenthal and Robert McDonald, and composition with Samuel Adler (composer).

== Works ==
List of compositions by Michael Stephen Brown
Year	Title	Instrumentation
2020	Concerto for Piano and Strings	Piano and Orchestra
2021	Merging Pods	Orchestral
2021	American Diaries	Orchestral
2022	Vortex	Cello and String Orchestra
2013	Violin Sonata	Violin and Piano
2016	Reflections	Piano Trio
2017	Prelude and Dance	Cello and Piano
2018	Garden Quartet	Clarinet, Violin, Cello and Piano
2018	Relationship	Clarinet and piano
2021	Twelve-Blocks	Piano Four-Hands, with Spoken Poetry
2024	The Lotos-Eaters	Flute, Cello, Piano, Percussion
2024	Spinning Song	Cello and Piano
2024	Sigh (after Mallarmé)	Violin and Piano
2015	After Three Statues	Mezzo Soprano and Piano
2017	Dearest Friend	Soprano, Baritone, Piano
2023	Loves Lives Lost	Soprano and Piano
2025	Pas de trois	Soprano, Viola, Piano
2012	Suite for Solo Cello	Cello
2013	Chant	Piano Four-Hands
2016	Surfaces	Piano
2020	Etude Fantasy on the Name of Haydn	Piano
2024	Four Lakes, Four Children	Piano
2024	Breakup Etude for the Right Hand Alone	Piano
