= Charles Wadsworth =

American pianist and musical promoter (1929–2025)

- Wadsworth, c. 1990
- Born: May 21, 1929; Barnesville, Georgia, U.S.
- Died: May 29, 2025 (aged 96)
- Education: University of Georgia; Juilliard School
- Occupations: Pianist; Festival director
- Organizations: Festival dei Due Mondi; Chamber Music Society of Lincoln Center; Spoleto Festival USA
- Awards: Ordre des Arts et des Lettres; Order of Merit of the Italian Republic; Order of the Palmetto

Charles Wadsworth (May 21, 1929 – May 29, 2025) was an American classical pianist and musical promoter from Newnan, Georgia. He established series of chamber music concerts, first at the Festival dei Due Mondi in Spoleto, Italy, in 1969 for the new Chamber Music Society of Lincoln Center in New York City, and in 1977 at the Spoleto Festival USA, directing it until 2009. For both the Spoleto series, he kept program and performers a secret until personally announcing them at the beginning of each concert.

== Life and career ==
Wadsworth was born in Barnesville, Georgia, on May 21, 1929, to Charles Wadsworth, a grocer and country fiddler, and Ethel Capps who worked in a shop for woman's clothing. They moved to Newnan. His mother took him to listen to concerts in Atlanta, including recitals of Sergei Rachmaninoff and Vladimir Horowitz. After local piano lessons, he studied from age 12 with Hugh Hodgson who founded the music department at the University of Georgia in Athens. Hodgson supported his interest in contemporary music and chamber music. Wadsworth also studied organ, playing in churches and for religious revivals. He began to accompany church singers on tours. He later worked as a vocal coach and accompanist for singers including Dietrich Fischer-Dieskau, Reri Grist, Jan Peerce, Beverly Sills, Frederica von Stade, and Shirley Verrett.

He moved to New York City at age 19, to study at Juilliard School with Alton Jones and Rosalyn Tureck. During his studies, he was director and accompanist of a church performance of Menotti's Amahl and the Night Visitors. Menotti was thankful, and they met in 1958 when Wadsworth appeared at an audition. Menotti invited the pianist to play Carlos Surinach's Piano Concerto at the Festival dei Due Mondi in Spoleto that he had founded. In 1959, Menotti invited him further to establish a chamber music series there. The concerts, played from 1960, brought him international recognition. Players included pianist Sviatoslav Richter, already well-known, and cellist Jacqueline du Pré at the beginning of her career. His series presented a daily concert for the month the festival lasted. Both pieces and players came as a surprise, which he announced at the beginning of each concert in broken Italian mixed with English, all of them in live broadcasts. Listeners laughed a lot, and he become known as "one of the most popular radio comedians".

The concerts in Spoleto brought him to the attention of William Schuman, president of Lincoln Center. When Schuman planned the Alice Tully Hall in 1965, he asked Wadsworth for a proposal for a chamber music series. Based on it, Wadsworth became artistic director of the Chamber Music Society of Lincoln Center a year later. The first concert was held for the inauguration of the hall on September 11, 1969, with a program of Bach's Trio Sonata in C, Schumann’s Dichterliebe, performed by baritone Hermann Prey, accompanied by Wadsworth, and Schubert's String Quintet. He led the organization as artistic director for twenty seasons, commissioning more than 60 new works, such as John Corigliano's Poem in October, David Del Tredici's Haddocks' Eyes, Boulez's ...explosante-fixe..., Ned Rorem's Winter Pages, and Oliver Knussen's Ophelia Dances, and works by Samuel Barber and Leonard Bernstein, among others He also presented many young performers, including Kathleen Battle, Richard Goode, Yo-Yo Ma, Jessye Norman, Peter Serkin, and Pinchas Zukerman. In his programs, he turned away from classical string quartets, towards different composers and different instrumental ensembles, for example Couperin's Le Parnasse, ou L'Apothéose de Corelli, Jan Dismas Zelenka's Trio Sonata for two oboes, bassoon and continuo, and Anton Arensky's Suite No. 1 for two pianos.

He also started a chamber music concert series at Menotti's Spoleto Festival USA in Charleston, South Carolina, in 1977, which he directed through 2009. Concerts were held twice a day, again as surprise concerts. He won the Emerson String Quartet for the festival; the St. Lawrence String Quartet became the festival's quartet in residence.

In 1996, Wadsworth organized a concert for the 1996 Summer Olympics, which included performances by Pinchas Zukerman, Itzhak Perlman, Lynn Harrell, and Frederica von Stade.

Wadsworth was invited to perform at the White House for Presidents John F. Kennedy, Richard Nixon, Gerald Ford, Jimmy Carter, and Ronald Reagan.

=== Personal life and death ===
Wadsworth was first married to Sarah Wadsworth; they had two children, Beryl Rajnic and David Wadsworth, but the marriage ended in divorce. He was married to Susan née Popkin, the founder of Young Concert Artists, from 1966; they had a daughter, Rebecca Banks.

Wadsworth died at a rehabilitation center in Manhattan on May 29, 2025, at the age of 96.

== Honors ==
Wadsworth received awards from the French Government as a Chevalier in the Ordre des Arts et des Lettres, and from Italy as a Cavaliere Ufficiale in the Order of Merit. He also received the Handel Medallion for his contributions to the cultural life of the New York City.

The Art Deco municipal auditorium in Newnan was renovated and renamed in 1998 the Charles Wadsworth Auditorium in his honor. He performed there annually from 1990 on.

The University of West Georgia created the Charles Wadsworth Music Scholarship in his honor. It was first established in 1990 by a citizens' group from Newnan, Georgia. He received the Order of the Palmetto and the Elizabeth O’Neill Verner Governor’s Award for the Arts in South Carolina. He was inducted into the American Classical Music Hall of Fame in 2012.

== Recordings ==
- Judith Blegen & Frederica von Stade: Songs, Arias & Duets, with the Chamber Music Society of Lincoln Center, Columbia, 1975
