= Carlo Grante =

Italian classical pianist

- Born: 1960 (age 65–66); L'Aquila, Abruzzo, Italy
- Genres: Classical
- Occupation: Musician
- Website: https://www.carlogrante.com/

Carlo Grante (born 1960) is an Italian classical pianist. Born in L'Aquila and graduating from the National Academy of St Cecilia in Rome, he performs classical and contemporary classical music. His discography consists of more than 50 albums.

== Biography ==
After graduating from the Conservatory of St. Cecilia under Sergio Perticaroli, Grante studied under Ivan Davis at the University of Miami, with Rudolf Firkusny at the Juilliard School in New York, and then with Alisa Kezheradze-Pogorelić in London.

Grante has performed and recorded a wide range of concert repertoire, focusing often on lesser-known works. His discography ranges from works by Franz Liszt and the complete sonatas of Domenico Scarlatti, to twentieth-century composers like Leopold Godowsky, Ferruccio Busoni and Kaikhosru Sorabji. He has performed with major orchestras across Europe such as Staatskapelle Dresden, Royal Philharmonic Orchestra, Orchestra i Pomeriggi Musicali, Cappella Istropolitana, Chamber Orchestra of Europe, MDR Leipzig Radio Symphony Orchestra, Orchestra dell'Accademia di Santa Cecilia, and Vienna Symphony. Grante has also written scholarly articles regarding research into methodology and piano literature.

At the Newport Music Festival in 1995, Grante performed the world premiere of the 53 Studies on the Études of Chopin by Leopold Godowsky. In 1996, on the occasion of two recitals at Wigmore Hall in London, a Musical Opinion reviewer wrote: "The discs of Grante had shown astonishing qualities... his live performances have then proved him to be the first rate pianist that his discs suggested." In 1997, he gave a series of six recitals in New York. He performed again at the Newport Music Festival in 2011 and 2012.

A number of works have been dedicated to him, most notably Chopin Dreams and a Piano concerto by composer Bruce Adolphe.

== Discography ==
- Busoni: Works for Piano and Orchestra, Orchestra dei Pomeriggi musicali di Milano, Music & Arts CD-1047
- Piano works by Busoni, Bloch, Finnissy & Flynn, Music & Arts CD-1247
- Busoni, Troncon – P. Troncon: 6 Preludes and Fugues F. Busoni: Prélude et Etude; Fantasia nach Bach; Vivace e Leggero; Perpetuum mobile, Music & Arts CD-1157
- Busoni, Vlad – Busoni: Fantasia Contrappuntistica, Roman Vlad: Opus Triplex, Music & Arts CD-1186-1
- Muzio Clementi – The Sonatas for Solo Piano, Vol. 1, Altarus
- Leopold Godowsky Edition, Vol. 1 – Passacaglia; 12 Schubert Song Transcriptions, Music & Arts CD-984
- Godowsky Edition, Vol. 2 – Bach Violin Sonatas Transcriptions, Music & Arts CD-1039
- Godowsky Edition, Vol. 3 – Bach Cello Suites Transcriptions, Music & Arts CD-1046
- Godowsky Edition, Vol. 4 – Studies on Chopin's Etudes, Music & Arts CD-1093
- Godowsky Edition, Vol. 5 – Transcriptions from Weber, Schumann, Chopin, Music & Arts CD-1189
- Godowsky Edition, Vol. 6 – "Renaissance" Transcriptions, Music & Arts CD-1215
- Godowsky Edition, Vol. 7 – Transcriptions and Paraphrases, Albeniz to Richard Strauss, Music & Arts CD-1259
- Godowsky Studies on Chopin's Etudes Vol. 1, Studien über die Etüden von Chopin Nos. 1–20, Altarus Air CD 9092
- Godowsky Studies on Chopin's Etudes Vol. 2, Studien über die Etüden von Chopin Nos. 21–43, Altarus Air CD 9093
- Godowsky Studies on Chopin's Etudes Vol. 3, Studien über die Etüden von Chopin Nos. 44–48, Passacaglia, 4 Chopin Waltz transcriptions, Altarus Air CD 9094
- Giovanni Benedetto Platti
  - Platti – Sonatas Vol. 1, Sonatas 1–4, Dante PSG9647
  - Platti – Sonatas Vol. 2, Sonatas 5–8, Dante PSG9648
  - Platti – Sonatas Vol. 3, Sonatas 9–13, Dante PSG9651
- Liszt, Busoni, Sorabji – Liszt: Norma Fantasy, Don Juan Fantasy, Busoni: Sonatina super Carmen, Sorabji: Carmen Pastiche, Altarus Air CD
- Franz Liszt – Via crucis, Harmonies poétiques et religieuses
- Carlo Grante Live in New York – Liszt: Mazeppa, Sonata, Bach-Busoni: Chaconne
- Wolfgang Amadeus Mozart – Concerto K. 449 – Concerto K. 488 – Concerto K. 365 (Orchestra dell’Accademia di Santa Cecilia, Rome; B. Sieberer, cond.; Barbara Panzarella, piano II in K. 365), Music & Arts CD-1222
- Poulenc; Saint-Saëns; Elliot – Music for Woodwinds and Piano, Altarus Air CD 9032
- Sergei Rachmaninoff – Preludes Op. 32, Corelli Variations, Isle of the Dead (transcr. G. Kirkor) Music & Arts CD-1128
- Scarlatti – Domenico Scarlatti, Vol. 1 (6 CDs, 90 Sonatas), 30 Essercizi, Parma book I: Sonatas 1–30, Parma book II: Sonatas 1–30, Music & Arts CD-1236
- Scarlatti – Domenico Scarlatti, Vol. 2 (6 CDs, 90 Sonatas), Parma book III: Sonatas 1–30, Parma book IV: Sonatas 1–30, Parma book V: Sonatas 1–30, Music & Arts CD-1242
- Franz Schmidt – Concertante Variations for piano (left hand) and orchestra, Concerto in E-flat major German Radio Orchestra, MDR Leipzig, Fabio Luisi, cond. Querstand VKJK 0611
- Robert Schumann – Three Piano Sonatas, Sonata, Op. 11, Sonata, Op. 14, Sonata, Op. 22 Music & Arts CD-1120
- Roman Vlad – Major piano works Cantata No. 3, "Le ciel est vide" Santa Cecilia Academy Chorus and Orchestra, Giuseppe Sinopoli, cond. Music & Arts CD-1217
- Maria Hofer – Toccata (piano solo) Ballada, for violoncello and piano (with Euden Prochak) Lieder (with Patrizia Cigna, Wolf Matthias Friedrich)
- Wolfgang Amadeus Mozart – Twelve Variations on "Ah vous dirai-je, Maman"

== Publications ==
- Criteri primari di metodologia pianistica, Rugginenti Editori, Milano, 2012 ISBN 978-88-7665-620-0. English Fundamentals of Piano Methodology (2013), ISBN 978-88-7665-637-8

== Bibliography ==
- Roberto Piana, Around the Piano. Appunti intorno al pianoforte, Magnum Edizioni, Sassari, 2001
- Roberto Piana incontra Carlo Grante, Editoriale Documenta, Cargeghe, 2009
