= Far Brook School =

Private school in New Jersey, United States

Location
- 52 Great Hills Road; Short Hills, NJ 07078; 40.7482°N 74.3147°W

Information
- Type: Private school
- Motto: They Shout for Joy, They Also Sing
- Established: 1948
- Head of school: Amy Ziebarth
- Faculty: 78
- Grades: Nursery - Eight
- Enrollment: 246 students in the 2025-2026 school year
- Student to teacher ratio: 5:1
- Website: School website

Far Brook School is a private, independent, nonsectarian, coeducational day school located in the Short Hills section of Millburn, in Essex County, New Jersey, United States, serving students in nursery through eighth grade.

Far Brook School is accredited by the Middle States Association of Colleges and Schools, Commission on Elementary Schools, and is a member of the National Association of Independent Schools, the New Jersey Association of Independent Schools, the Educational Records Bureau, and the Council for the Advancement and Support of Education.

== Notable alumni ==
- David Finckel (born 1951), cellist who is co-artistic director of the Chamber Music Society of Lincoln Center
- Michael Lerner (1943–2024), rabbi and political activist, who was the founder and editor of Tikkun magazine

== Notable staff ==
- Edwin Finckel was the school's music director for 39 years
