= Edwin Finckel =

American jazz performer (1917–2001)

Edwin A. Finckel
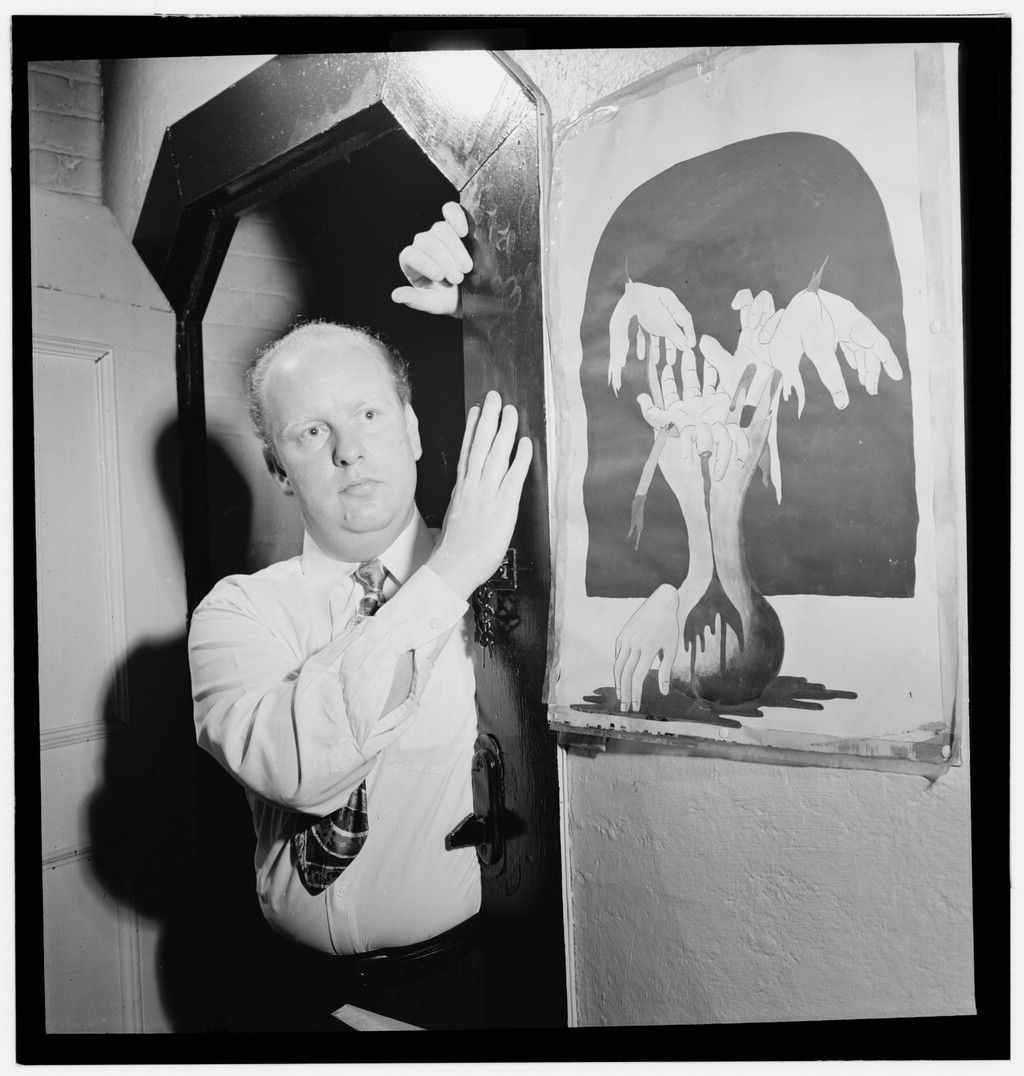
- Edwin A. Finckel at his home with his painting
- Born: 23 December 1917; Washington, D.C., U.S.
- Died: 7 May 2001 (aged 83); Madison, Wisconsin, U.S.
- Education: Corcoran School of Art
- Known for: Composing and teaching
- Spouse: Helen
- Children: David Finckel

Edwin A. Finckel (23 December 1917 – 7 May 2001) was an American jazz performer and arranger and a composer of songs and classical music.

== Biography ==
Finckel was born in Washington, D.C., as the youngest of six children. His father was a patent attorney and both his parents were musical. All of his five elder siblings received musical training but Edwin was left to his own devices with regard to music, but his artistic talents won him a scholarship at the Corcoran School of Art. He did not give up his interest in art but he also found access to a piano and, within a year, he had taught himself to play, albeit unconventionally and without the ability to read music. Finckel took to jazz although he also showed skill as a tennis player while still a teenager.

Finckel was well regarded for his ability to improvise music and he went on to arrange others and later composed over 200 of his own melodies. He was appearing professionally as a teenager and he went on to introduce string instruments into his arrangement for big bands. His best known song may be "Where Is the One", which was recorded by Frank Sinatra on his Where Are You? album.

Finckel wrote songs for the 1945 film George White's Scandals. The photo illustrated here shows Finckel posing for a magazine picture where he has been chosen as a representative of the musical "Modern School" in 1947. He went into teaching where he led the music department of the private Far Brook School in New Jersey for 39 years. At the school, he gave private lessons, conducted the choir and orchestra, and wrote much of the music that the children sing every morning and at special events. The school also employed his wife, Helen, as a secretary. When Edwin Finckel retired in 1990 his position was taken up by Mr. F. Allen Artz III. Finckel continued to perform jazz and in his forties he also wrote classical music. His son David is a professional cellist who performed and recorded his father's composition for piano and cello Of Human Kindness with his wife Wu Han.

Finckel and his wife, Helen, ran a summer camp for 17 years until 1980 called "Point Counter Point" and it continued under new management after they gave up that commitment.

A resident of Madison, New Jersey, he died there in 2001.
