= Carolivia Herron =

American writer

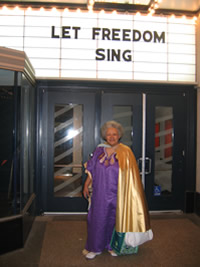
- Herron at opening of Let Freedom Sing
- Born: Carol Olivia Herron; July 22, 1947 (age 79); Washington, D.C., U.S.
- Education: Eastern Baptist College (BA); Villanova University (MA); University of Pennsylvania (MFA, PhD)
- Occupations: Writer; scholar
- Website: www.carolivia.com

Carolivia Herron (born Carol Olivia Herron; July 22, 1947) is an American writer of children's and adult literature, and a scholar of African-American Judaica.

== Personal life ==
She was born to Oscar Smith Herron and Georgia Carol (Johnson) Herron, in Washington, D.C.

Herron converted to Judaism in adulthood, and she has paternal-line Jewish descent from her grandmother via Jewish Geechees.

She is a founding member of "Jews of African Descent".

== Education ==
She has a BA in English from Eastern Baptist College in Pennsylvania (now Eastern University). She earned an M.A. in English from Villanova University in 1973, and an MFA in creative writing and a PhD in comparative literature and literary theory from the University of Pennsylvania.

Herron spent a postdoctoral research year at Brandeis University investigating the subject of African-American Jews.

== Writing ==
Her debut novel, Thereafter Johnnie, a semi-autobiographical portrayal of African-American life, was critically well received.

Her critically acclaimed picture book Nappy Hair, a call-and-response story based on her own experiences as a child, was the cause of massive controversy when a New York City public school teacher was accused of racism after using it in the classroom. Nappy Hair was originally planned as a chapter of an adult book, is influenced by the epic tradition and African praise tradition.

Herron edited the papers of Angelina Weld Grimke for Oxford University Press.

Many of her writings, including her multimedia novel in progress, "Asenath and Our Song of Songs", refer to the intersections between Judaic and African cultures. Textual portions of "Asenath and Our Song of Songs" were published as separate novels in 2014, "Asenath and the Origin of Nappy Hair," and 2016, "PeacesongDC."

Her children's book Always an Olivia recounts the coming of Herron's Jewish ancestors from Tripoli, Libya, to the Georgia Sea Islands in the Americas.

Herron wrote the libretto of the opera Let Freedom Sing: The Story of Marian Anderson, composed by Bruce Adolphe, which was commissioned and premiered by the Washington National Opera and the Washington Performing Arts Society in 2009.

== Teaching ==
Herron has taught literature at many institutions, including Harvard University, Mount Holyoke College, Brandeis University, California State University, Chico, William and Mary, and Marien N'Guabi University in Brazzaville, Republic of the Congo. In 2017 Herron joined the Classics Department at Howard University, and currently teaches undergraduate courses in Humanities (mostly epics) and Blacks in Antiquity.

She also teaches children directly working directly in Grecian epics with her vast understanding of ancient Greece mythology. She also has the ability to translate the ancient language.

== Scholarship ==
Her scholarship includes work on African-American Judaica. Her scholarship also includes work on children's literature, multicultural literature, and Star Trek. Herron is currently developing Epicenter Stories to assist in her work with children, literacy, and multiculturalism.

== Bibliography ==
=== Adult ===
- Thereafter Johnnie, 1991
- Asenath and the Origin of Nappy Hair, 2015

=== Children's ===
- Nappy Hair, 1997
- Always an Olivia, 2007

=== Non-fiction ===
- Selected works of Angelina Weld Grimké, 1991
- “Nappier Hair: In Brenda’s Own Voice or Setting the Record Straight.” The Lion and the Unicorn, Volume 37, Number 2 (April 2013): 188-194.
- “Early African American Poetry.” The Columbia History of American Poetry., edited by Jay Parini and Brett Millier, 16-32. New York: Columbia University Press; 1993. xxxi, 894.
- “Philology as Subversion: The Case of Afro-America.” Comparative Literature Studies, vol. 27, no. 1 (1990): 62–65.
