= Claude Frank =

German-born American pianist

Claude Frank (born Claus Johannes Frank; December 24, 1925 – December 27, 2014) was a German-born American pianist.

== Biography ==
Of Jewish ancestry, Frank was born in Nuremberg, Germany. His father immigrated to Brussels after the advent of the Third Reich, and the family eventually settled in Paris when Frank was 12. Frank subsequently began studies at the Paris Conservatoire, but in 1940, he and his mother escaped France by way of the Pyrenees and Lisbon, and settled in the USA. Frank studied with Artur Schnabel in New York, for whom he first played in Europe. He also was a pupil of Maria Curcio. He studied composition and conducting at Columbia University, where his teachers included Paul Dessau. At Tanglewood, he studied with Serge Koussevitzky. He became an American citizen in 1944 and served in the US military, which interrupted his piano studies.

In 1954, Frank entered the Leventritt Competition and, although he lost to Van Cliburn he made a deep impression on jurist Eugene Istomin, who became a fast friend and active supporter, saying of Frank: “I was, again, a kind of mentor to him. Not really, because I had a great respect for him. He was a very strong musician, trained by Schnabel in all those values of expressiveness and seeing the whole Gestalt of a work. Anyway, we had a great deal of respect for each other.”

Frank was a member of the Boston Symphony Chamber Players. He served on the faculty of the Curtis Institute of Music, and presented master classes at Yale University, Duke University, the University of Kansas, and the North Carolina School of the Arts among many others. He joined the piano faculty of the Yale School of Music in 1973. Frank wrote his memoirs with co-author Hawley Roddick, The Music That Saved My Life: From Hitler's Germany to the World's Concert Stages. As part of the cultural events surrounding the 2008 Beijing Olympics, Frank performed alongside nine other celebrated pianists at "The Olympic Centenary Piano Extravaganza of China".

Frank often gave joint concerts with his wife, pianist Lilian Kallir (1931–2004), whom he had met in 1947 at Tanglewood. The couple married in 1959 in Marlboro, Vermont, and the marriage lasted until Kallir's death. The couple had a daughter, the violinist Pamela Frank (born 1967), with whom Frank also appeared in recital, and who survives her father. The father-daughter team recorded the complete sonatas for violin and piano of Beethoven commercially. Other commercial recordings by Frank included a complete set of the 32 Beethoven piano sonatas, issued on the RCA Victrola label in the Beethoven bicentenary year of 1970, in parallel with a series of live concerts of the complete Beethoven sonatas.

Frank died on December 27, 2014, three days after his 89th birthday.
