= Avery Fisher Prize =

- Awarded for: "American solo instrumentalists who have demonstrated outstanding achievement and excellence in music, with consideration, since 2004, also being given to chamber ensembles."
- Sponsored by: Avery Fisher Artist Program
- Location: New York City
- Country: United States
- Presented by: Avery Fisher Artist Program
- Reward: US$100,000, marble plaque in David Geffen Hall
- First award: 1975
- Website: www.lincolncenter.org/series/avery-fisher-artist-program/

The Avery Fisher Prize is an award given to American musicians for outstanding achievement in classical music. Founded by philanthropist Avery Fisher in 1974, it is regarded as one of the most significant awards for American instrumentalists. The award is decided by members of the Avery Fisher Artist Program, which is administered by the Lincoln Center for the Performing Arts; artists do not apply, and nominations are secret. The prize was initially accompanied by an award of $10,000; it has since increased to $100,000. The Avery Fisher Artist Program awards the Prize.

== List of winners ==
The list below includes only those who have won the Avery Fisher Prize, for years in which it has been awarded. It does not include awardees of the Avery Fisher Career Grant or the Avery Fisher Recital Award.

- 1975: Murray Perahia, Lynn Harrell
- 1978: Yo-Yo Ma
- 1979: Emanuel Ax
- 1980: Richard Goode
- 1982: Horacio Gutiérrez
- 1983: Elmar Oliveira
- 1986: Richard Stoltzman
- 1988: André Watts
- 1991: Yefim Bronfman
- 1994: Garrick Ohlsson
- 1999: Sarah Chang, Pamela Frank, Nadja Salerno-Sonnenberg
- 2000: Edgar Meyer, David Shifrin
- 2001: Midori
- 2004: The Emerson String Quartet
- 2007: Joshua Bell
- 2008: Gil Shaham
- 2011: Kronos Quartet
- 2014: Jeremy Denk
- 2017: Claire Chase
- 2018: Leila Josefowicz
- 2020: Anthony McGill
- 2024: Hilary Hahn
- 2026: Jean-Yves Thibaudet
