= Pamela Frank =

American violinist (born 1967)

- Born: June 20, 1967 (age 59); New York, New York
- Occupations: Classical violinist; Music professor
- Years active: 1988–present
- Website: www.opus3artists.com/artists/pamela-frank

Pamela Frank (born June 20, 1967) is an American violinist, with an active international career across a varied range of performing activity. Her musicianship was recognized in 1999 with the Avery Fisher Prize, one of the highest honors given to American instrumentalists. In addition to her career as a performer, Frank holds the Herbert R. and Evelyn Axelrod Chair in Violin Studies at the Curtis Institute of Music, where she has taught since 1996, and is also an adjunct professor of Violin at the University of Southern California's Thornton School of Music since 2018.

== Biography ==
Frank was born in New York City, the daughter of two pianists, Claude Frank and Lilian Kallir. She studied under Shirley Givens using the Givens Method, unlike many of her contemporaries, who generally begin with the Suzuki Method as children. In 1983 and 1984 she attended the Music Academy of the West summer conservatory. She began her performing career in 1985, when she appeared with Alexander Schneider and the New York String Orchestra at Carnegie Hall.

Pamela Frank has performed regularly with today's most distinguished soloists and ensembles, including the orchestras of Philadelphia, Chicago, Cleveland, Boston, New York, San Francisco, and Baltimore, as well as the Berlin, St. Petersburg, and Israel philharmonics. Her chamber music projects include performances with such artists as Peter Serkin, Yo-Yo Ma, Emanuel Ax, and her father, Claude Frank, and frequent appearances with the Academy of St Martin in the Fields, Chamber Music Society of Lincoln Center, and Musicians from Marlboro. In 1999 Pamela Frank was awarded the Avery Fisher Prize, one of the highest honors given to American instrumentalists.

She is on the faculties of the Peabody Institute of Johns Hopkins University, the Curtis Institute of Music, and the State University of New York at Stony Brook.

Since 2012 Pamela Frank is chair of the jury of the Yehudi Menuhin International Competition for Young Violinists.

She is married to physical therapist Howard Nelson.

== Discography ==
On Argo:

- Kernis Lament & Prayer, with David Zinman and the Minnesota Orchestra (1999)

On Arte Nova:

- Mozart Violin Concertos 1-5 with David Zinman and the Tonhalle Orchestra (2000)
- Schubert: Works for Violin and Piano, with Claude Frank (2005)

On Decca Records:

- Dvorak Violin Concerto, Romance, Suk Fantasy with Sir Charles Mackerras and the Czech Philharmonic Orchestra (1998)
- Brahms Complete Violin Sonatas, with Peter Serkin (1998)

On Delos:

- Herrmann "Souvenirs de Voyage" for Clarinet and String Quartet (1992)
- Prokofiev Quintet for Oboe, Clarinet, Violin, Viola and Bass in G minor, Op. 39 (1993)

On Hänssler Classics:

- Bruch Violin Concerto No. 1 in G minor, Op. 26 with Neville Marriner and The Academy of St Martin in the Fields (2004)

On MusicMasters:

- Beethoven 10 Sonatas for Violin & Piano, with Claude Frank (1999)

On Naxos Records:

- Zwilich Violin Concerto, with Michael Stern and the Saarbrücken Radio Symphony Orchestra (2005)

On Sony Classical:

- Chopin Trio for Violin, Cello and Piano in G minor, Op. 8 (1994)
- Schubert Quintet in A Major, D. 667 "Trout" (1996)
- Schubert Quintet in C Major, D. 956 (1990)
