= George Flynn =

American composer and pianist

George Flynn is a distinguished American composer and pianist. Born in Miles City, Montana on January 21, 1937, he grew up in Montana and Washington. He received his B.A. and Ph.D. from, and taught at Columbia University, New York City, and from 1977 to 2001 headed the Department of Composition at DePaul University in Chicago. His works cover a wide range of genres, from symphonies to electronic compositions. His 114-minute piano cycle Trinity was described in Tempo in 2005 as a ‘masterpiece’. It consists of three very large piano pieces, Kanal, Wound and Salvage, each performable on its own. The work has been recorded by the pianist Fredrik Ullén.

== Selected compositions ==
Orchestral

- Mrs. Brown for chamber orchestra and tape (1965)
- First Symphony "Music For Orchestra" (1966)
- Tirades and Dreams for chamber orchestra, narrator and soprano (1972)
- Second Symphony (1981)
- Meditations, Praises for chamber orchestra (1981)
- Focus for chamber orchestra (1983)
- Coloration for chamber orchestra (1983)
- Quietude for small orchestra (1983)
- Lost and Found for youth orchestra (1984)
- A Reign of Love for narrator and orchestra (1992)
- Surfaces for chamber orchestra (1997)
- Winter Dusk for string orchestra (1999)
- Rita's Dance (2000)

Concertante

- The Density of Memory for clarinet trio and orchestra (1997)
- American City for piano and wind ensemble (1998)

Chamber music

- Piano Quartet (1963)
- Solos and Duos for violin and piano (1964)
- Four Pieces for violin and piano (1965)
- Duo for clarinet and piano (1966)
- Duo for trumpet and piano (1974)
- American Festivals and Dreams for string quartet (1976)
- Duo for cello and piano (1977)
- Duo for violin and piano (1979)
- Celebration for violin and piano (1980)
- Fantasy Etudes for violin solo (1981)
- Saxophone Quartet (1982)
- Woodwind Quintet (1983)
- American Rest for clarinet, viola, cello and piano (1982, 1984)
- Diversion for flute, clarinet, violin, cello and piano (1984)
- American Summer for violin, cello and piano (1986)
- Turmoil and Lullabies for clarinet, viola, cello and piano (1986)
- Disquietude and Lullaby for clarinet, viola, cello and piano (1986)
- Diversions for Five Woodwinds (1988)
- Til Death for violin and piano (1988)
- Who Shall Inherit the Earth? for clarinet, viola and 2 pianos (1989)
- Forms of Flight for clarinet solo (1991)
- The Streets are Empty for saxophone quartet (1992)
- Duo for viola and piano (1974, 1985, 1995)
- Winter Landscape Duo for cello and piano (1998)
- Together for violin and piano (2003)
- American Enchantment for string quartet (2003)
- Seeking Serenity for violin and piano (2005)

Harpsichord

- Drive (1973)

Piano

- Fuguing (1962)
- Fantasy (1966)
- Music for Piano Four Hands (1966)
- Wound (1968)
- Kanal (1976)
- American Icon (1988)
- Pieces of Night (American Nocturnes) (1989)
- Toward the Light (1991)
- Salvage (1993)
- Preludes (1994)
- Derus Simples (1995)
- Glimpses of Our Inner Lives (2001)
- Remembering (2003)

Vocal

- Benedictus for mixed voices (1962)
- Christmas Fanfare for mixed chorus (1972)
- Lady of Silences for female chorus (1973)
- Ave Maria for mixed voices unaccompanied, or with piano (1973
- Ave Maria for female chorus (1973)
- Songs of Destruction for soprano and piano (1974)
- Dies Sanctificatus for soprano, alto and piano (1976)
- Dawn for mixed chorus (1977)
- Dusk for mixed chorus (1977)
- Kyrie for female chorus (1977)
- Agnus Dei for female chorus (1977)
- American Voices for mixed chorus, horn and piano (1983)
