= Karina Canellakis =

American conductor and violinist

Karina Canellakis (born August 23, 1981) is an American conductor and violinist.

== Biography ==
Born in New York City, of Greek and Russian background, Canellakis grew up in a family of musicians. Her parents were music students at the Juilliard School. Her father Martin became a conductor, and her mother Sheryl became a pianist. She studied violin as a youth, and her younger brother Nicholas studied cello. She continued music studies at the Curtis Institute, where her teachers included Ida Kavafian, and graduated from Curtis in 2004. As a violinist, she played as a substitute in the Chicago Symphony Orchestra, and was a guest leader with the Bergen Philharmonic Orchestra.

From 2005 to 2007, Canellakis was a violinist with the Berlin Philharmonic Orchester-Akademie. Whilst in Berlin, Simon Rattle encouraged her growing interest in conducting. She studied conducting at the Juilliard School from 2011 to 2013, where her teachers included Alan Gilbert. She also studied conducting with Fabio Luisi, at the Pacific Music Festival. In 2013, she was the winner of the Taki Concordia Conducting Fellowship. From 2014 to 2016, she was the assistant conductor of the Dallas Symphony Orchestra. Early in her career in the Dallas post, in October 2014, she stood in as an emergency substitute for Jaap van Zweden with the Symphony No. 8 of Shostakovich, without rehearsal. Her work in contemporary music has included performing with and conducting the International Contemporary Ensemble (ICE), and conducting the premiere of David Lang's chamber opera The Loser in September 2016.

Canellakis made her European conducting debut in 2015 with the Chamber Orchestra of Europe, as an emergency substitute for Nikolaus Harnoncourt. In 2016, she won the Georg Solti Conducting Award. Her conducting debut at The Proms in September 2017 was also her debut with the BBC Symphony Orchestra (BBC SO). Also in September 2017, Canellakis made her first guest-conducting appearance with the Berlin Radio Symphony Orchestra (RSO Berlin).

In March 2018, Canellakis first guest-conducted the Radio Filharmonisch Orkest (RFO), with concerts in Utrecht and Amsterdam. On the basis of this series of concerts, in May 2018, the RFO announced the appointment of Canellakis as its next chief conductor, effective with the 2019–2020 season, with an initial contract of 4 years. This appointment marks Canellakis' first orchestral post. She is the first female conductor to be named chief conductor of the RFO, and the first female conductor to be named chief conductor of any Dutch orchestra. In September 2021, the RFO announced the extension of Canellakis' contract as its chief conductor through July 2027. In April 2025, the RFO announced a further extension of Canellakis' contract as its chief conductor through August 2031. With the RFO, Canellakis has made commercial recordings for Deutsche Grammophon and for PENTATONE, which include the first commercial recordings of Rachmaninoff's The Bells and Symphonic Dances with a female conductor.

In December 2018, Canellakis conducted the annual Nobel Prize concert with the Royal Stockholm Philharmonic Orchestra, the first female conductor to do so. In April 2019, the RSO Berlin announced the appointment of Canellakis as its next principal guest conductor, the first female conductor named to the post, effective with the 2019–2020 season. On 19 July 2019, Canellakis became the first female conductor to conduct the First Night of The Proms, at the Royal Albert Hall (London). In April 2020, the London Philharmonic Orchestra (LPO) announced the appointment of Canellakis as its new principal guest conductor, the first female conductor named to the post, effective September 2020, following her first guest-conducting appearance with the LPO in October 2018. She stood down as principal guest conductor of the RSO Berlin at the close of the 2022–2023 season. In February 2024, the LPO announced the extension of Canellakis' contract as principal guest conductor for an additional three years. In June 2026, the LPO announced a further extension of Canellakis' contract as principal guest conductor through the close of the 2029–2030 season.

Canellakis and her family reside in The Netherlands.

Cultural offices
Preceded by Markus Stenz	Chief Conductor, Radio Filharmonisch Orkest; 2019–present	Succeeded by incumbent
