= Philharmonia Zurich =

- Orchestra
- Former name: Zurich Opera Orchestra
- Founded: 1985; 41 years ago
- Location: Zurich, Switzerland
- Concert hall: Zurich Opera House
- Principal conductor: Gianandrea Noseda
- Website: Official website

Philharmonia Zurich is the orchestra of Zurich Opera. As an independent body of 116 contract players, it has existed since 1985 under the name of Zurich Opera Orchestra. It was renamed in 2012 with the appointment of director Andreas Homoki and general music director Fabio Luisi.

== History ==
The history of Philharmonia Zurich is closely linked to that of Zurich's Tonhalle Orchestra. Opera has been performed in Zurich since 1834, at first in the Aktientheater at Untere Zäune, Zurich's first permanent theatre, until it burned to the ground on New Year's Eve 1890. Richard Wagner conducted in the Aktientheater in the early 1850s, including the first performance of The Flying Dutchman and of Tannhäuser. For his own productions he augmented the orchestra, on one occasion from 30 to 70 players. In 1851 Wagner wrote an essay entitled 'A Theatre in Zurich', in which he outlined his suggestions for the reform of Zurich's musical life, although at first none of them could be implemented. In 1853 he directed the first Wagner-Festspiele in the Aktientheater within the framework of the Allgemeine Musikgesellschaft (General Music Society) in Zurich.

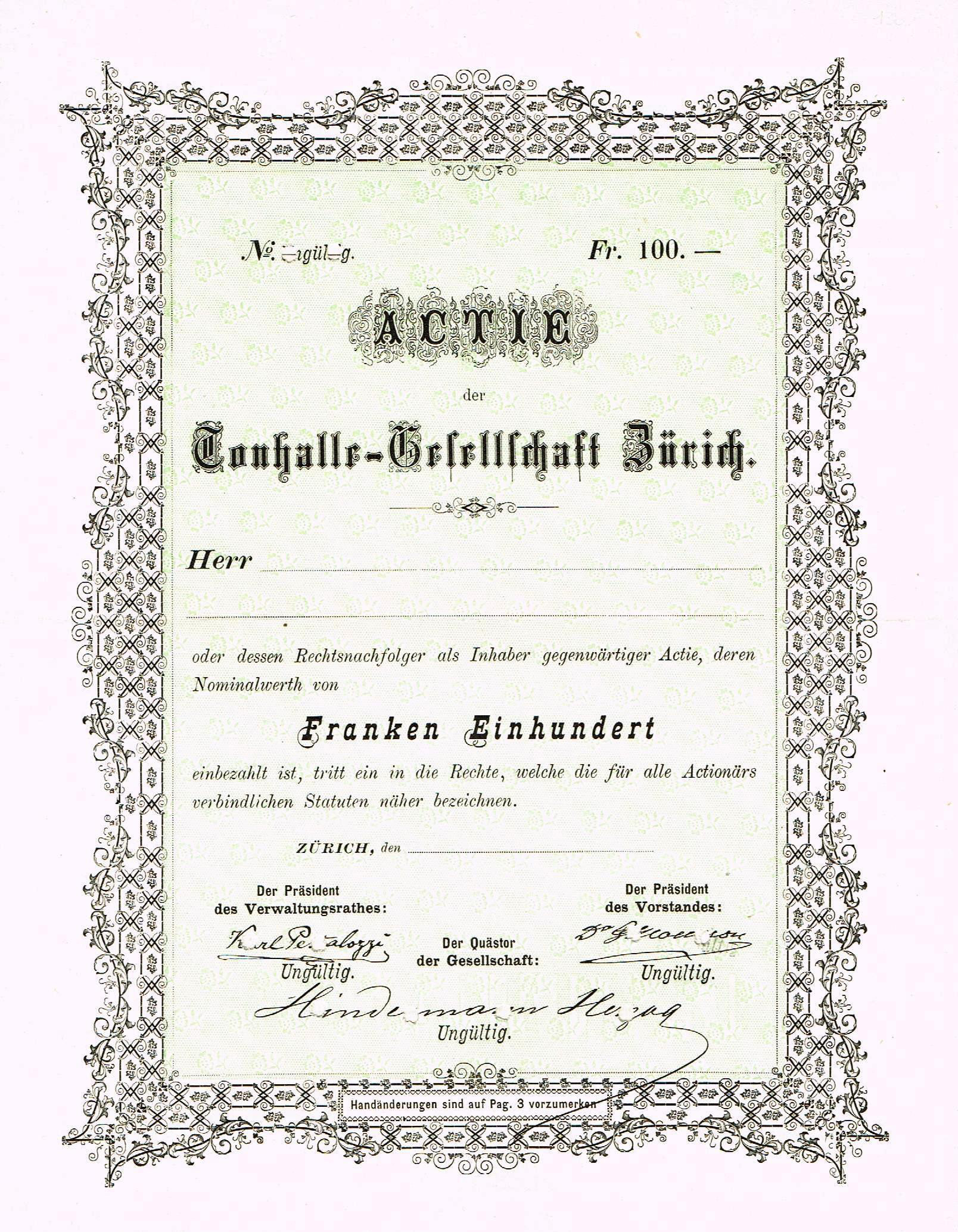
Share of the Tonhalle-Gesellschaft Zürich, not issued

The Orchesterverein, Zurich's first permanent professional ensemble, was founded in 1861. The 31 musicians played for the Allgemeine Musikgesellschaft (in the Kasino, now the Geschworenengericht) and for the Aktientheater. In 1867 the Schweizerisches Musikfest took place in Zurich, and for this purpose the old Kornhaus (Corn Exchange), on the site of today's opera house, was converted into a concert hall. In 1868 the Tonhalle Gesellschaft (Tonhalle Society) was set up and took over the running of the orchestra from the Allgemeine Musikgesellschaft.

In the Grosser Tonhalle-Saal, its new concert hall built in 1895, the orchestra achieved distinction under the direction of its first chief conductor, Friedrich Hegar and his friend Johannes Brahms. An intensive collaboration with the composer Ferruccio Busoni followed under chief conductor Volkmar Andreae. At the Stadttheater, built in 1891, artistic personalities like Richard Strauss and the young Wilhelm Furtwängler determined the orchestra's progress. Richard Strauss conducted and attended many performances of his own stage works in Zurich. Several first performances of works by composers ostracised in Germany and Austria by the Nazi regime took place in Zurich's Stadttheater, such as Alban Berg's Lulu (1927) and Paul Hindemith's Mathis der Maler (1938). Many other significant operatic works of the twentieth century were also premiered at the "Opernhaus Zürich", as it has been known since 1964. The Zurich Stadttheater was also one of the leading houses in the field of operetta, particularly during the period of discrimination against numerous Jewish composers of this genre, such as Ralph Benatzky, Oscar Straus, Paul Abraham and Emmerich Kálmán.

In 1944, the Schweizerische Rundspruchgesellschaft (Swiss Broadcasting Corporation) dissolved its Zurich-based radio orchestra. Thanks to an initiative of the mayor of Zurich at the time, Adolf Lüchinger, the entire radio orchestra was incorporated into the Tonhalle Orchestra from 1 December 1944. The 142-strong orchestra was divided into concert and theatre formations, and was known from then on as the Tonhalle- und Theaterorchester TTO Zürich. In 1946 the first woman was awarded a permanent position in the violin section. By 1968 there were fifteen female musicians. There followed contractual regulation of working conditions (collective labour agreements 1947, 1954, 1965) and of the orchestral work distribution between the Tonhalle Gesellschaft and Theater AG, and the establishment of an orchestral management and joint committee.

Highlights in the history of the theatre branch of the TTO were the Monteverdi and Mozart cycles begun in the 1970s with Nikolaus Harnoncourt (Musical Director) and Jean-Pierre Ponnelle (Stage Director). Further influences on the Opera House orchestra were conductors such as Ferdinand Leitner (Chief Musical Director at Zurich Opera House from 1969 until 1984) and Nello Santi (Musical Director from 1958 until 1969, and regular guest conductor ever since).

Managerial staffing difficulties and the century-old wish of the Tonhalle Gesellschaft and Zurich Opera House for independent programming led in 1985 to the rescission of the articles of association of both institutions and to the splitting of the TTO into the Tonhalle Orchestra and the Zurich Opera Orchestra. This split occurred at the same time as the renovation of the Opera House in 1984 and the preceding heated cultural and political debate in Zurich, which had led to disturbances by young people in the city in 1980.

The subsequently independent Zurich Opera Orchestra is the only exclusive theatre orchestra in Switzerland. Under its chief musical director, Ralf Weikert (active in this capacity from 1985 to 1992), the previous theatre formation of the TTO was progressively enlarged (Weikert attended a total of 86 auditions as chief conductor), and the orchestra extended its scope to include the Philharmonic Concerts, which take place around six times per year.

From within the orchestra, the ensemble La Scintilla was formed in 1994, specializing in historically-informed performance on original instruments. Its activities were soon expanded and integrated into the orchestral schedule, so that today Zurich Opera House has at its disposal a specialist period-instrument ensemble, which works together with such notable conductors in this field as Nikolaus Harnoncourt, William Christie, Christopher Hogwood and Giovanni Antonini.

Alexander Pereira, director of Zurich Opera House from 1991 until 2012, was particularly committed to the development and promotion of the orchestra. Franz Welser-Möst served as chief conductor from 1995 until 2008 (and as general music director from 2005) and brought the opera house and its orchestra international repute. Numerous DVD productions arising from television recordings document Pereira's tenure as director. Since then, guest conductors such as Riccardo Chailly, Christoph von Dohnányi, Vladimir Fedoseyev, John Eliot Gardiner, Valery Gergiev, Bernard Haitink, Nikolaus Harnoncourt, Heinz Holliger, Zubin Mehta, Ingo Metzmacher, Georges Prêtre, Nello Santi, Ralf Weikert, and both Ivan and Adam Fischer have worked with the orchestra. Daniele Gatti was chief conductor from 2009 until 2012.

== Principal conductors ==
- 1985–1992: Ralf Weikert
- 1995–2008: Franz Welser-Möst
- 2009–2012: Daniele Gatti
- Since 2012: Fabio Luisi

== Orchestra Academy ==
The members of Philharmonia Zurich also engage in pedagogical work. The orchestra runs an academy with places for 15 students. During their two-year period in the academy young musicians are trained for their profession. In addition to this, a collaboration with Zurich University of the Arts (ZHdK) gives students on the MA orchestra-specialisation course the opportunity to receive practical tuition.

== "Philharmonia Records" ==
In 2014, in collaboration with Opernhaus Zürich AG, Philharmonia Zurich launched the label Philharmonia Records, which released its first CD and DVD recordings in January 2015 on the occasion of the orchestra's thirtieth anniversary.

=== Releases ===
- Hector Berlioz: Symphonie Fantastique
  • Richard Wagner: Preludes and Interludes
  • Giuseppe Verdi: Rigoletto. DVD
  • Sergei Rachmaninoff: Complete piano concertos. Soloist: Lise de la Salle. (Release date: October 2015)
- Sergei Rachmaninoff: Piano Trios. Lise de la Salle, Bartlomiej Niziol, Claudius Herrmann (2016)
- Anton Bruckner: Symphony No. 8 (original version 1876) (2016)
- Alban Berg: Wozzeck. DVD (2016)
- Vincenzo Bellini: I Capuleti e i Montecchi. DVD (2016)
- Nikolai Rimsky-Korsakov: Scheherezade (2016)
- Frank Martin: Die Weise von Liebe und Tod des Cornets Christoph Rilke (2017)
- Giuseppe Verdi: Overtures and Preludes (2017)
- Anton Bruckner: Symphony No. 4 ("Romantic) (2018)
- Franz Schubert: Symphony in C major D944 ("The Great") (2019)

== Discography ==
- Verdi: Macbeth (1865 revised version) (TDK) 2001
- Mozart 250th Anniversary Edition: Operas III (Warner Classics) 2005
- Mozart: La Clemenza di Tito (Warner Classics) 2005
- Verdi: Rigoletto (Arthaus) 2007
- Beethoven: Fidelio (Opus Arte) 2010

== Further reading (German) ==
- Walter Baumann: Vom Aktientheater zum Opernhaus. In: Turicum, Winter 1984.
- Wilhelm Bickel: 100 Jahre Zürcher Stadttheater. In: Zürcher Statistische Nachrichten 1934.
- Hans Erismann: Das fing ja gut an... Zürich 1984.
- Max Fehr: Richard Wagners Schweizer Zeit. Aarau/Leipzig 1934.
- Martin Hürlimann: Theater in Zürich. 125 Jahre Stadttheater. Zürich 1959.
- Gottfried Kummer: Beiträge zur Geschichte des Zürcher Aktientheaters. Zürich 1938.
- Eugen Müller: Eine Glanzzeit des Zürcher Stadttheaters. Zürich 1911.
- Eugen Müller: 100 Jahre Stadttheater. Festschrift. 1934.
- Aus einer alten Theaterchronik. In: Zürcher Taschenbuch 1934.
- Friedemann Arthur Pfenninger: Zürich und sein Theater im Biedermeier. Zürich 1980.
- Friedemann Arthur Pfenninger: Zürich und sein Theater auf dem Weg zur Belle Epoque. Zürich 1981.
- Reinhold Rüegg: Blätter zur Feier des fünfzigjährigen Jubiläums des Zürcher Stadttheaters. Zürich 1884.
- Rudolf Schoch: Hundert Jahre Tonhalle Zürich. Zürich 1968.
- Richard Wagner: Gesammelte Schriften und Dichtungen. Leipzig 1880.
- Sigmund Widmer: Zürich, eine Kulturgeschichte. Zürich 1982.
- Theater? Theater! Begleitpublikation zur Ausstellung des Stadtarchivs, Zürich 1991.
- Geschichte des Kantons Zürich, Band 3: 19. und 20. Jahrhundert. Zürich 1994.
- Zeitungen des 19. Jahrhunderts: Allgemeine Theaterchronik Leipzig, Neue Zürcher Zeitung, Tagblatt der Stadt Zürich, Züricher Post,
- Jahrbücher des Stadttheaters Zürich, 1923–1925 und 1984/1985.
- Unterlagen des Aktientheaters: Protokolle der Vorsteherschaft, Theaterjournale, Verträge, Theaterzettel im Stadtarchiv Zürich.
