= Nicholas Canellakis =

American cellist (born 1984)

Nicholas Canellakis (born 1984 in New York City) is an American cellist. He made his Carnegie Hall concerto debut in 2015 with the American Symphony Orchestra. He has performed as soloist with the Albany Symphony as his sister Karina Canellakis conducted, as well as the Delaware, New Haven, Lansing, and Bangor Symphonies. He is an artist at the Chamber Music Society of Lincoln Center, and is a former member of CMS Two (now known as the Bowers Program). He regularly performs duo recitals with pianist Michael Brown. He is the Artistic Director of Chamber Music Sedona in Arizona.

Nicholas Canellakis is also a filmmaker and actor. He created and stars in the web series “Conversations with Nick Canellakis.”

Nicholas Canellakis is a graduate of the Curtis Institute of Music and New England Conservatory where he studied with Orlando Cole, Peter Wiley, and Paul Katz.
