= Lilian Kallir =

American pianist (1931–2004)

Lilian Kallir (May 6, 1931 – October 25, 2004) was a Czech-born American pianist. Born in Prague in 1931, she moved to New York in 1940, where she studied the piano under Isabelle Vengerova and Herman de Grab, and composition and theory under Hugo Kauder. She made her debut with the New York Philharmonic in 1957, and in 1959 married fellow pianist Claude Frank, with whom she frequently performed together in her career. In 1975, Kallir became a teacher at the Mannes School of Music, where she was once a student. She toured frequently and collaborated with a wide range of orchestras and musicians, and was nominated for a Grammy Award for a performance of Mozart's Piano Concerto No. 17.

Kallir and Frank had one daughter, violinist Pamela Frank. Towards the end of her life, Kallir was diagnosed with posterior cortical atrophy, a case that was documented by neurologist and writer Oliver Sacks in his book The Mind's Eye. She died of ovarian cancer in 2004.
