= Music@Menlo =

Music festival

- Status: Active
- Genre: classical music festival
- Inaugurated: 2003
- Founder: David Finckel and Wu Han
- Organiser: Menlo School
- Website: musicatmenlo.org

Music@Menlo is an annual summer chamber music festival and institute in Atherton, California. The festival was founded in 2003 by cellist David Finckel and pianist Wu Han. In October 2026, cellist Dmitri Atapine and pianist Hyeyeon Park became Music@Menlo Artistic Directors. American Public Media says that "Music@Menlo has rapidly become one of the world's top-tier chamber music festivals due to the quality of performance and its goal to rejuvenate the classical music experience." Music@Menlo's highly selective Chamber Music Institute offers string players and pianists ages nine to twenty-nine the opportunity to fully engage in a multitude of offerings including performances, lectures, master classes, and other educational events. The organization also holds a Winter Residency on the campus of Menlo School, including educational and outreach events, and a series of artist-curated residencies in Menlo Park and Atherton.

== Festival history ==
Number	Festival name	Year	Venue
1	The Unfolding of Music	2003	Menlo School
2	Origin/Essence: A Musical Odyssey	2004	Menlo School
3	Beethoven: Center of Gravity	2005	Menlo School
4	Returning to Mozart	2006	Menlo School
5	Bridging the Ages	2007	Menlo School
6	The Unfolding of Music II	2008	Menlo School
7	Being Mendelssohn	2009	Menlo School
8	Maps and Legends	2010	Menlo School and Performing Arts Center at Menlo-Atherton High School
9	Through Brahms	2011	Menlo School and Performing Arts Center at Menlo-Atherton High School
10	Resonance	2012	Menlo School and Performing Arts Center at Menlo-Atherton High School
11	From Bach	2013	Menlo School and Performing Arts Center at Menlo-Atherton High School
12	Around Dvořák	2014	Menlo School and Performing Arts Center at Menlo-Atherton High School
13	Schubert	2015	Menlo School and Performing Arts Center at Menlo-Atherton High School
14	Russian Reflections	2016	Menlo School and Performing Arts Center at Menlo-Atherton High School
15	The Glorious Violin	2017	Menlo School and Performing Arts Center at Menlo-Atherton High School
16	Creative Capitals	2018	Menlo School and Performing Arts Center at Menlo-Atherton High School
17	Incredible Decades	2019	Menlo School and Performing Arts Center at Menlo-Atherton High School
18	Intermezzo	2020	Menlo School and Performing Arts Center at Menlo-Atherton High School
19	Gather	2021	Menlo School
20	Haydn Connections	2022	Menlo School
21	Beethoven Unfolding	2023	Menlo School
22	French Reflections	2024	Menlo School
23	Constellations: Ensemble Magic	2025	Menlo School
24	Redux	2026	Menlo School
