= David Finckel =

American musician

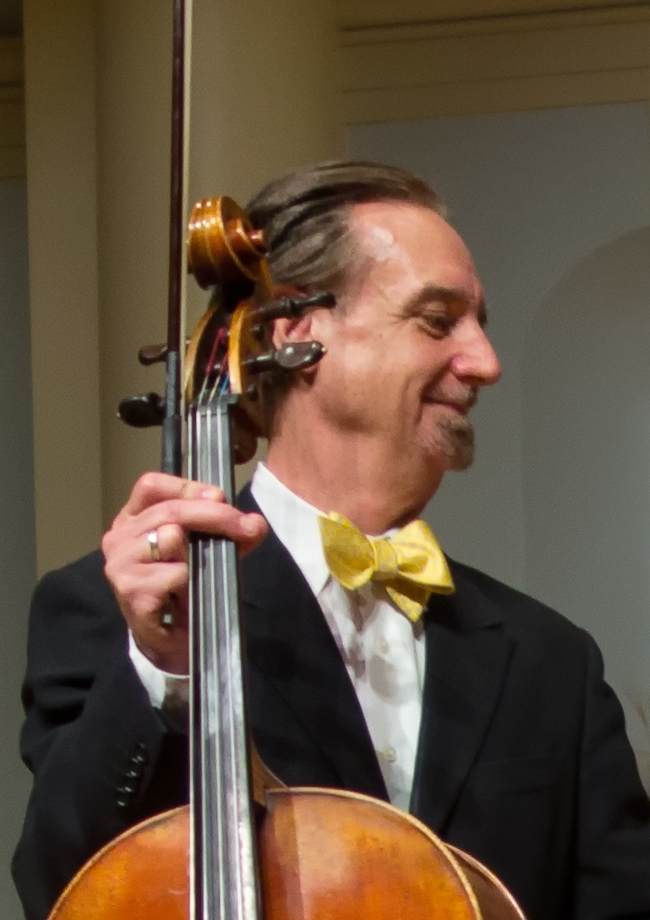
- David Finckel, in 2013

Background information
- Born: December 6, 1951 (age 74)
- Origin: New Jersey, US
- Genres: Classical
- Occupations: Cellist, arts administrator
- Instrument: Cello
- Labels: ArtistLed; Deutsche Grammophon; Music@Menlo LIVE
- Website: www.davidfinckelandwuhan.com

David Finckel (born December 6, 1951) is an American cellist and influential figure in the classical music world. The cellist for the Emerson String Quartet from 1979 to 2013, Finckel is currently the co-artistic director of the Chamber Music Society of Lincoln Center in New York, co-founder of the independent record label ArtistLed, co-artistic director and co-founder of Music@Menlo in Silicon Valley, producer of Cello Talks, professor of cello at The Juilliard School, and visiting professor of music at Stony Brook University.

Finckel frequently collaborates with pianist Wu Han. The two were married in 1985. They regularly perform on the chamber music series in the United States, as well as across Europe and Asia. They also appear in trio performances with violinist Philip Setzer and clarinetist David Shifrin, and as a piano quartet with violinist Daniel Hope and violist Paul Neubauer.

== Early life and education ==
Raised in Madison, New Jersey, Finckel graduated from Far Brook School.

== Discography and digital media ==
David's more than 80 releases on the ArtistLed, CMS Live, and Music@Menlo LIVE labels include the staples of the cello-piano duo repertoire with pianist Wu Han and masterworks of the chamber repertoire with numerous musicians. In recent seasons, David has designed and produced more than 200 digital media projects, which brought the art of chamber music in dozens of communities across the United States.

== The Chamber Music Society of Lincoln Center ==
In 2004, Finckel and Wu Han were appointed Co-Artistic Directors of the Chamber Music Society of Lincoln Center in New York City. The Chamber Music Society is one of eleven constituents of Lincoln Center.

== Music@Menlo ==
In 2003, Wu Han and Finkel co-founded Music@Menlo, an annual chamber music festival. Alumni of both Music@Menlo's Chamber Music Institute and internship program have gone on to create and direct more than 30 chamber music organizations worldwide.

In 2002, Finckel developed and trademarked AudioNotes, an innovative complement to program notes. The listener guides are designed to offer audiences engaging introductions to many of the concert programs presented over the years.

Finckel's 100 online lessons on cello technique, Cello Talks, are viewed by an international audience of musicians.

== Media ==
Finckel has been the subject of numerous articles including in The Wall Street Journal, The New York Times, Los Angeles Times, San Francisco Chronicle, Toronto Star, New York Newsday, The Mercury News, The Strad, BBC Music Magazine, Strings Magazine, San Francisco Classical Voice, Concerti magazine, Musical America, The Washington Post, and The Violin Channel. On television, he has appeared on NBC Nightly News, PBS's Live from Lincoln Center, Medici TV, Channel 13 New York Voices and Articulate with Jim Cotter and has also been a frequent guest on National Public Radio, American Public Media's Performance Today, Saint Paul Sunday, and other popular classical radio programs.

== Discography ==
- Bach, Mendelssohn, Debussy, Britten (2018)
- Wu Han LIVE II (2016)
- Simple Gifts: The Chamber Music Society at Shaker Village (CMS Live, 2016)
- Romantic Piano Quartets (Brahms, Schumann, Mahler) on Deutsche Grammaphon with Daniel Hope, Paul Neubauer and Wu Han (2015)
- Dvorak/Thomas (2015 re-release of 2003 Cello Classics CD)
- Wu Han LIVE (2014)
- Dvorak Piano Trios with Philip Setzer and David Finckel (2012)
- Mendelssohn: The Piano Trios with Philip Setzer and David Finckel (2012)
- Clarinet Trios with David Shifrin and David Finckel (2011)
- For David and Wu Han (contemporary works composed for David Finckel and Wu Han) (2010)
- Bach: The Brandenburg Concertos (CMS Live, 2010)
- Dreams of Fancy, Tales of Loss (DG Concerts, 2008-09)
- Schubert Piano Trios with Philip Setzer and David Finckel (2008)
- Beethoven and Dvorak Piano Quartets (CMS Studio, 2007)
- CMS Studio Recordings: Elgar and Walton (2007)
- CMS Studio Recordings: Beethoven and Dvořák (2007)
- DG Concerts: Bartok/Dvořák (2007)
- Brahms Sonatas (2005)
- Schubert Sonatas (2004)
- Edwin Finckel: Music For Cello (2001)
- Russian Classics (2001)
- Beethoven: Complete Works for Piano & Cello (1998)
- Sonatas by Strauss, Franck, and Finckel (1997)
- Sonatas by Tchaikovsky and Kodály with Da-Hong Seetoo and David Finckel (1997)
- Sonatas by Grieg, Schumann, and Chopin (1997)

Emerson String Quartet

- ESQ: Complete Recordings on Deutsche Grammophon (2016)
- Journeys: Tchaikovsky, Schönberg (2013)
- Mozart: The Prussian Quartets (2011)
- Old World-New World (2010)
- Intimate Letters (2009) - GRAMMY AWARD WINNER FOR BEST CHAMBER MUSIC PERFORMANCE
- Bach Fugues (2008)
- BRAHMS: String Quartets (2007)
- The Little Match Girl (2007) - OSCAR NOMINATED SHORT FILM
- Intimate Voices (2006) – GRAMMY AWARD WINNER FOR BEST CHAMBER MUSIC PERFORMANCE
- Mendelssohn: The Complete String Quartets (2005) - WINNER OF 2 GRAMMY AWARDS INCLUDING BEST CHAMBER MUSIC PERFORMANCE
- Haydn: The Seven Last Words of our Savior on the Cross, Op. 51 (2004)
- Bach: The Art of Fugue, BWV 1080 (2003)
- The Emerson Encores (2002)
- The Haydn Project (2004)
- Shostakovich: The String Quartets (complete) (2000) - GRAMMY AWARD WINNER FOR BEST CLASSICAL & BEST CHAMBER PERFORMANCE
- Mozart/Brahms: Clarinet Quintets with David Shifrin (1999)
- Schubert: String Quintet; Late Quartets (1999)
- Music of Curt Cacioppo: "Monsterslayer" (1998)
- Meyer: String Quintet/Rorem: String Quartet No. 4 (1998)
- Beethoven: Key to the Quartets (1997)
- Beethoven: The String Quartets (Complete) (1997) - GRAMMY AWARD WINNER FOR BEST CHAMBER MUSIC PERFORMANCE
- Schumann Piano Quintet Op. 44/ Piano Quartet Op. 47 (1996)
- Webern: Works for String Quartet/String Trio Op. 20 (1995)
- Mozart: String Quartet in G, K. 387; String Quartet in d, K. 421 (1995)
- Dvorák: Quartet in E-flat, Op. 87; Quintet in A, Op. 81 (1994)
- American Contemporaries: Harbison, Wernick, and Schuller (1994)
- American Originals: String Quartets of Ives and Barber (1993) GRAMMY AWARD FOR BEST CHAMBER MUSIC PERFORMANCE
- Schubert: String Quintet in C, D. 956 (1992)
- Prokofiev: String Quartets Nos. 1 & 2/Sonata for 2 Violins (1992)
- Mozart: The Flute Quartets with Carol Wincenc (1992)
- Mozart: The "Haydn" Quartets (complete) (1992)
- Bartók: Complete String Quartets (1990) - GRAMMY AWARD WINNER FOR BEST CLASSICAL AND BEST CHAMBER MUSIC PERFORMANCE
- Beethoven: Quartet in f, Op. 95; Schubert: Quartet No. 14 in d, D. 810 "Death and the Maiden" (1990)
- Brahms: Quartet No. 1 in c, Op. 51; Schumann: Quartet in A, Op. 41, No. 3 (1990)
- Mozart: Quartet in B-flat, K. 458 "Hunt"; Quartet in C, K. 465 "Dissonance"; Haydn: Quartet in C, Op. 76, No. 3 "Emperor (1990)
- Tchaikovsky: Quartet No. 1 in D, Op. 11; Borodin: Quartet No. 2 in D (1990)
- Debussy: Quartet in g, Op. 10; Ravel: Quartet in F (1990)
- Dvorák: Quartet No. 12 in F, Op. 96 "American"; Smetana: Quartet No. 1 in e, "From My Life" (1990)
- Beethoven: Quartet in F, Op. 135; Schubert: Quartet in G, D. 887 (1990)
- Imbrie: Quartet No. 4; Schuller: Quartet No. 2 (1990)
- Cowell: Quartet Euphometric; Harris: Three Variations on a Theme (Quartet No. 2); Shepherd: Triptych for Soprano and String Quartet with Betsy Norden (1990)
- Piston: Concerto for String Quartet, Winds and Percussion (1990)
