= Chamber Music Society of Lincoln Center =

American nonprofit organization

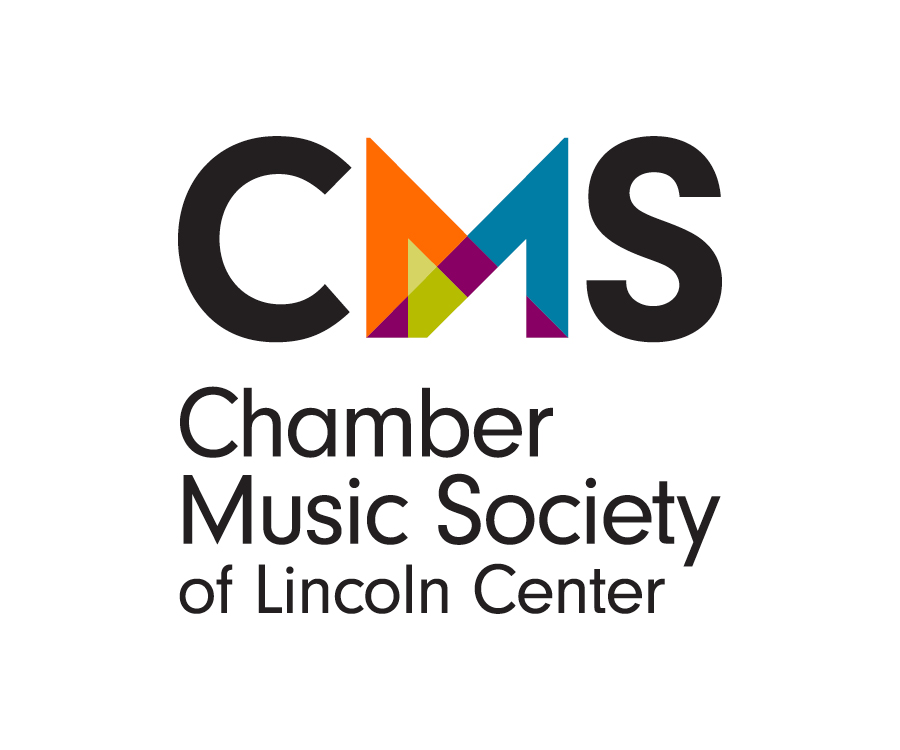

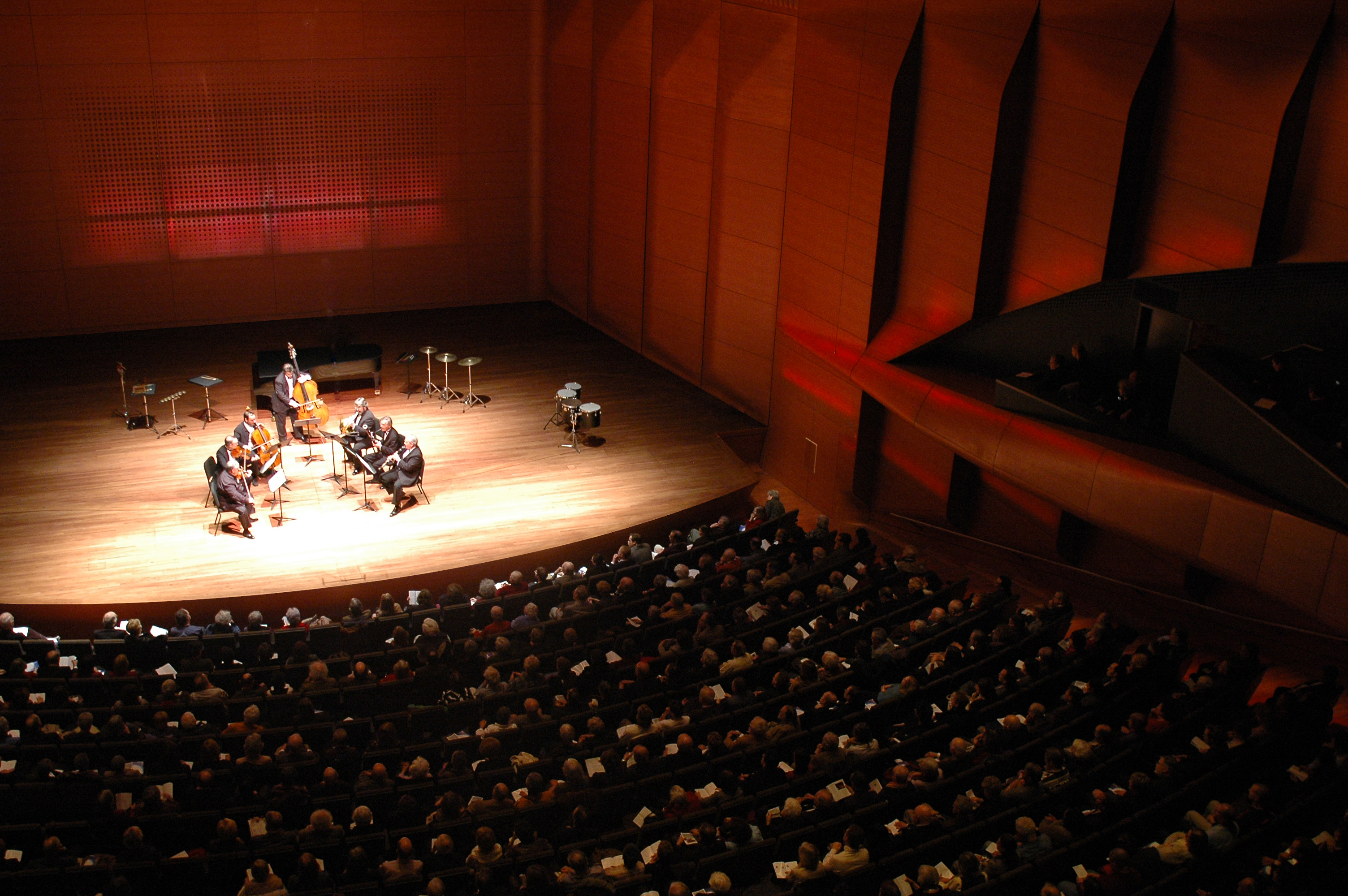
- Chamber Music Society artists perform in Alice Tully Hall.
- Formation: 1969; 57 years ago
- Type: Chamber Music organization
- Headquarters: Alice Tully Hall at Lincoln Center
- Artistic Directors: David Finckel and Wu Han
- Website: ChamberMusicSociety.org

The Chamber Music Society of Lincoln Center (CMS) is an American organization dedicated to the performance and promotion of chamber music in New York City and around the world. It is the largest organization of its kind in the country for chamber music. CMS's home is Alice Tully Hall, located in New York's Lincoln Center for the Performing Arts.

Founded in 1969 by pianist Charles Wadsworth with the patronage of Alice Tully, the first performance at Alice Tully Hall was September 11, 1969. The current artistic directors are cellist David Finckel and pianist Wu Han.

== Overview ==
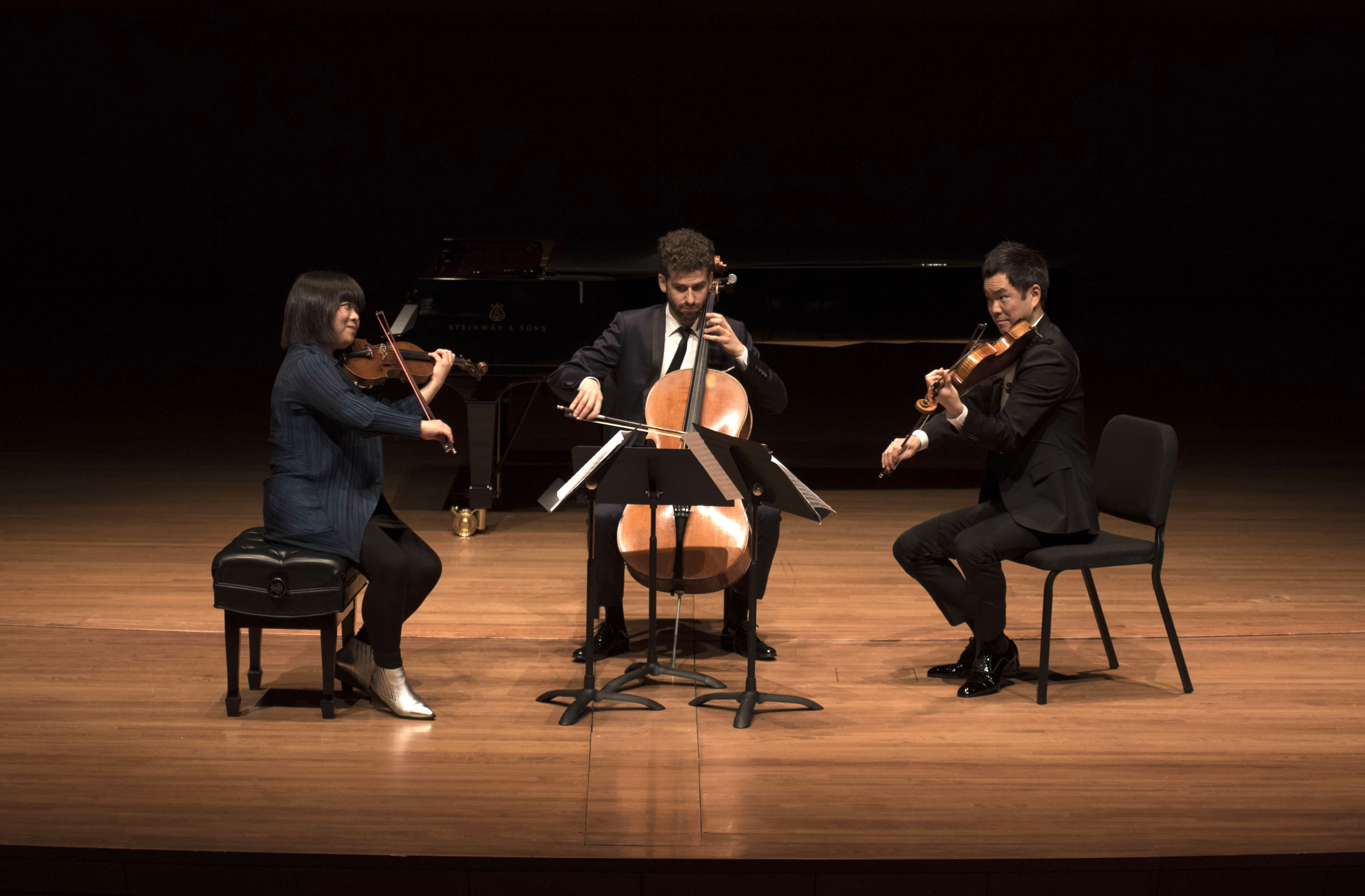
(Left to Right) Chamber Music Society artists Yura Lee, Nicholas Canellakis, and Richard O'Neill

External audio
- You may hear the Chamber Music Society of Lincoln Center performing Johannes Brahms's Quintet in B minor for Clarinet and Strings, Op. 115 in 2011 Here on archive.org

CMS' Alice Tully Hall hosts mainstage performances. The complete Brandenburg Concertos are performed each December, and have been called a "New York holiday staple" by The New York Times. The Daniel and Joanna S. Rose Studio hosts other events, including contemporary compositions, lectures, and classes.

The Bowers program is a residency program at the Chamber Music Society of Lincoln Center. It was known as CMS Two until it was renamed after a donation by philanthropist Ann S. Bowers. Alumni of the program include Inon Barnatan, Lang Lang, Hilary Hahn, Paul Huang, Nicholas Canellakis, Anthony McGill, Alisa Weilerstein, and the Escher String Quartet.

CMS presents more than 80 concerts per season outside of New York City, including concerts in North America, Europe and Asia. They are known for their focus on older works.

An exhibit at New York Public Library celebrated their 50th anniversary in 2019.

== Artistic Directors ==
- Charles Wadsworth (1969–1989)
- Fred Sherry (1989–1993)
- David Shifrin (1993–2004)
- David Finckel and Wu Han (2004–present)
