= Emerson String Quartet =

American string quartet

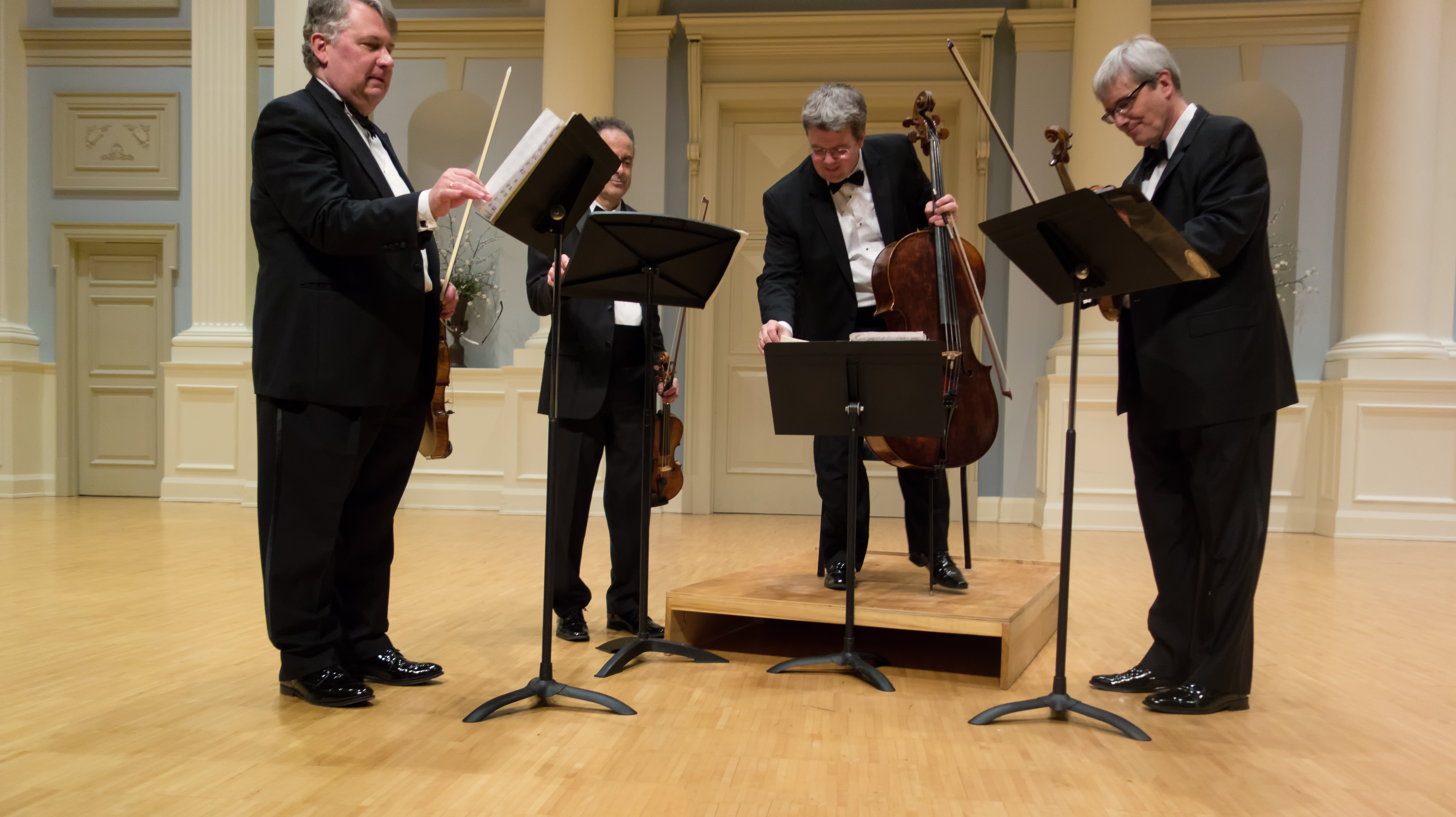
- The Emerson String Quartet in 2014

Background information
- Also known as: The Emerson Quartet
- Origin: New York City, United States
- Genre: Classical
- Occupation: String quartet
- Instruments: 2 violins, 1 viola, 1 cello
- Years active: 1976–2023
- Labels: Deutsche Grammophon, New World, Sony Classical
- Members: Eugene Drucker; Philip Setzer; Lawrence Dutton; Paul Watkins
- Past members: Guillermo Figueroa, Jr. Eric Wilson; David Finckel
- Website: www.emersonquartet.com

The Emerson String Quartet, also known as the Emerson Quartet, was an American string quartet initially formed as a student group at the Juilliard School in 1976. It was named for American poet and philosopher Ralph Waldo Emerson and began touring professionally in 1976. The ensemble taught in residence at The Hartt School in the 1980s and is currently the quartet in residence at Stony Brook University. Both of the founding violinists studied with Oscar Shumsky at Juilliard, and the two alternated as first and second violinists for the group. The Emerson Quartet was one of the first such ensembles with the two violinists alternating chairs.

The Emerson Quartet was inducted into the Classical Music Hall of Fame in 2010. As of May 2014, they had released more than thirty albums and won nine Grammy Awards, as well as the prestigious Avery Fisher Prize in 2004. In 2017, the Emerson String Quartet Institute became part of the College of Arts and Sciences at Stony Brook University. The institute enables members of the current quartet and the quartet's former cellist David Finckel to mentor and coach student string quartets.

In August 2021, the quartet announced its plan to disband at the end of the 2022–2023 season in order to focus on teaching and solo work. In the final season of concerts in 2022-23, the quartet gave farewell performances throughout North America and Europe. The final performance of the quartet took place on Sunday, October 22, 2023, in New York City, featuring a program of Beethoven's Op. 130 string quartet (with its original ending, the Grosse Fuge, Op. 133) and Schubert's String Quintet D. 956. The performance was filmed by Tristan Cook for a documentary, Four Rational People, released in 2026.

== Members ==
The members of the group at the time of its retirement were: Eugene Drucker and Philip Setzer, violin; Lawrence Dutton, viola (since 1977); and Paul Watkins, cello (since 2013).

Previous members were: Guillermo Figueroa, Jr., viola (1976–1977); Eric Wilson, cello (1976–1979); and David Finckel, cello (1979–2013).

== History ==
In the early 1980s, Deutsche Grammophon chose the Emerson Quartet to begin a series of recordings of the string quartet literature to be released on the new CD digital format. Cellist David Finckel called this a "huge break" for the ensemble, allowing it to develop a worldwide audience for its performances.

== Instruments ==
In addition to using their Stradivarius instruments, the Emerson quartet own instruments by Samuel Zygmuntowicz which they often favour in larger halls as they believe they have better projection. Violinist Eugene Drucker even says of his modern violin "In a large space like Carnegie Hall, the Zygmuntowicz is superior to my Strad. It has more power and punch."

== Awards and recognition ==
Grammy Award for Best Chamber Music Performance:

- 1989 Bartók: 6 String Quartets
- 1993 Ives: String Quartets Nos. 1, 2; Barber: String Quartet Op.11 (American Originals)
- 1997 Beethoven: The String Quartets
- 2000 Shostakovich: The String Quartets
- 2005 Mendelssohn: The Complete String Quartets
- 2006 Intimate Voices
- 2009 Intimate Letters

Grammy Award for Best Classical Album:

- 1989 Bartók: 6 String Quartets
- 2001 Shostakovich: The String Quartets

Gramophone Classical Music Awards:

- Chamber (Record of the Year) 1989 - Bartók: String Quartets Nos. 1–6
- Chamber 2000 – Shostakovich, Complete String Quartets Nos. 1–15

In 2002 the Quartet were the Music Directors of the Ojai Music Festival. They also played for the Oscar nominated short film, The Little Matchgirl. They have also won the Avery Fisher Prize, and in 2010, were inducted into the Classical Music Hall of Fame, with a ceremony held in 2011. In January 2015, the Quartet received the Richard J. Bogomolny National Service Award, the highest award in the classical chamber music world.

== Recordings ==
- Volume I - Dvorák: Quartet No. 12 in F, Op. 96 "American;" Smetana: Quartet No. 1 in E "From My Life." (1990) Book of the Month Records
- Volume II - Brahms: Quartet No. 1 in c, Op. 51; Schumann: Quartet in A, Op. 41, No. 3 (1990) Book of the Month Records
- Volume III - Borodin: Quartet No. 2 in D; Tchaikovsky: Quartet No. 1 in D, Op.11 (1990) Book of the Month Records
- Volume IV - Debussy: Quartet in g, Op. 10; Ravel: Quartet in F Major. (1990) Book of the Month Records
- Piston: Concerto for String Quartet, Winds and Percussion (1990) Composers Recording Inc
- Cowell: Quartet Euphometric; Harris: Three Variations on a Theme (Quartet No. 2) (1990) New World
- Imbrie: Quartet No. 4; Schuller: Quartet No. 2 (1990) New World
- Beethoven: Quartet in F, Op. 135; Schubert: Quartet in G, D. 887 (1990) Deutsche Grammophon
- Dvorák: Quartet No. 12 in F, Op. 96 "American"; Smetana: Quartet No. 1 in E, "From My Life." (1990) Deutsche Grammophon
- Debussy: Quartet in g, Op. 10; Ravel: Quartet in F (1990) Deutsche Grammophon
- Tchaikovsky: Quartet No. 1 in D, Op. 11; Borodin: Quartet No. 2 in D (1990) Deutsche Grammophon
- Mozart: Quartet in B-flat, K. 458 "Hunt"; Quartet in C, K. 465 "Dissonance"; Haydn: Quartet in C, Op. 76, No. 3 "Emperor (1990) Deutsche Grammophon
- Brahms: Quartet No. 1 in c, Op. 51; Schumann: Quartet in A, Op. 41, No. 3 (1990) Deutsche Grammophon
- Beethoven: Quartet in f, Op. 95; Schubert: Quartet No. 14 in d, D. 810 "Death and the Maiden" (1990) Deutsche Grammophon
- Bartók: Complete String Quartets (1990) Deutsche Grammophon
- Mozart: The "Haydn" Quartets (complete) (1992) Deutsche Grammophon
- Mozart: The Flute Quartets with Carol Wincenc (1992) Deutsche Grammophon
- Prokofiev: String Quartets Nos. 1 & 2/Sonata for 2 Violins (1992) Deutsche Grammophon
- Schubert: String Quintet in C, D. 956 with Mstislav Rostropovich (1992) Deutsche Grammophon
- American Originals: String Quartets of Ives and Barber (1993) Deutsche Grammophon
- American Contemporaries: Harbison, Wernick, and Schuller (1994) Deutsche Grammophon
- Dvorák: Quartet in E-flat, Op. 87; Quintet in A, Op. 81 with Menahem Pressler (1994) Deutsche Grammophon
- Mozart: String Quartet in G, K. 387; String Quartet in d, K. 421 (1995) Deutsche Grammophon
- Webern: Works for String Quartet/String Trio Op. 20 (1995) Deutsche Grammophon
- Schumann Piano Quintet Op. 44/ Piano Quartet Op. 47 with Menahem Pressler (1996) Deutsche Grammophon
- Beethoven: The String Quartets (Complete) (1997) Deutsche Grammophon
- Beethoven: Key to the Quartets (1997) Deutsche Grammophon
- Meyer: String Quintet/Rorem: String Quartet No. 4 with Edgar Meyer (1998) Deutsche Grammophon
- Music of Curt Cacioppo: "Monsterslayer") (1998) Capstone Records
- Schubert: String Quintet; Late Quartets (1999) Deutsche Grammophon
- Mozart/Brahms: Clarinet Quintets with David Shifrin (1999) Deutsche Grammophon
- Shostakovich: The String Quartets (complete) (2000) Deutsche Grammophon
- The Haydn Project (2001) Deutsche Grammophon
- The Emerson Encores (2002) Deutsche Grammophon
- Bach: The Art of Fugue, BWV 1080 (2003) Deutsche Grammophon
- Haydn: The Seven Last Words of our Savior on the Cross, Op. 51 (2004) Deutsche Grammophon
- Mendelssohn: The Complete String Quartets (2005) Deutsche Grammophon
- Intimate Voices (2006) Deutsche Grammophon
- The Little Match Girl (2007) Disney
- Brahms: String Quartets (2007) Deutsche Grammophon
- Bach Fugues (2008) Deutsche Grammophon
- Intimate Letters (2009) Deutsche Grammophon
- Old World-New World (Dvorak) with Paul Neubauer (2010) Deutsche Grammophon
- Mozart: The Prussian Quartets (2011) Sony Classical
- Journeys: Tchaikovsky, Schönberg (2013) Sony Classical
- Berg: Lyric Suite; Wellesz: Sonnets By Elizabeth Barrett Browning (2015) Decca
- Emerson String Quartet: The Complete DG Recordings (2016) Deutsche Grammophon (52 CDs)
- Chaconnes And Fantasias - Music Of Britten And Purcell (2017) Decca
- Schumann - String Quartets (2020) PENTATONE

== See also ==
- List of string quartet ensembles
