= List of people from Santa Rosa, California =

The following list includes notable people who were born or have lived in Santa Rosa, California, United States.

== Artists, designers, and cartoonists ==
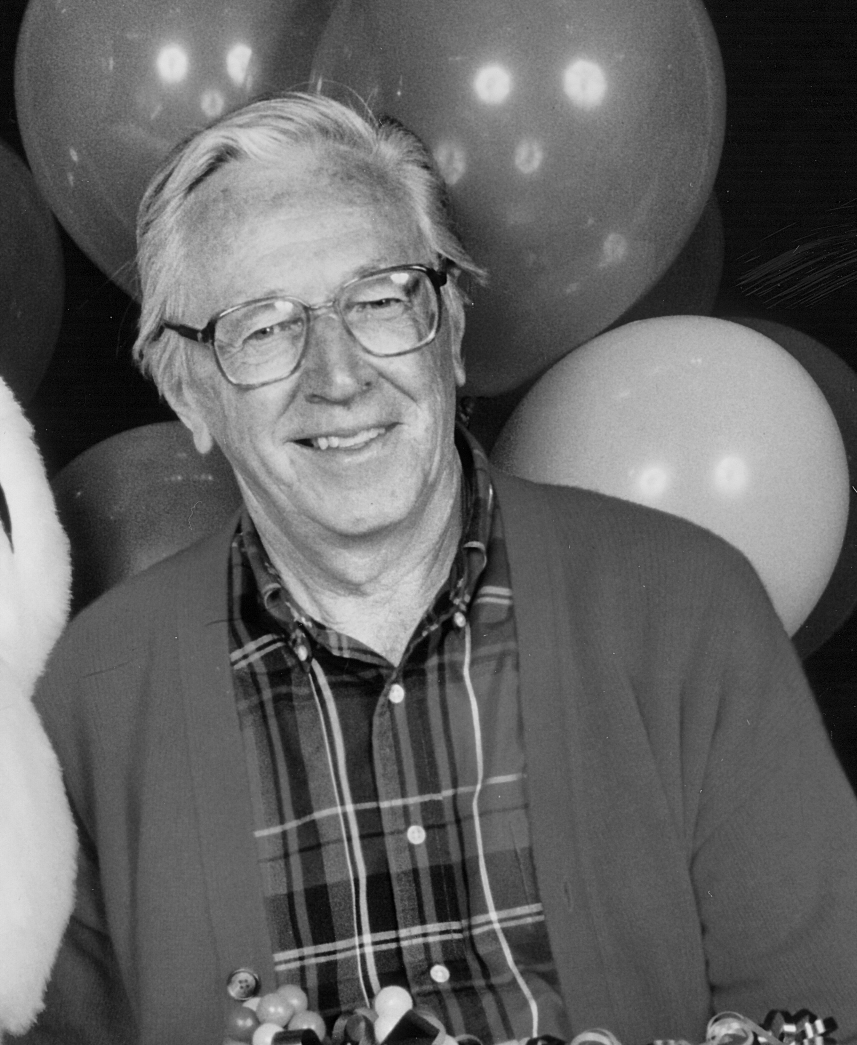
Charles Schulz (1993), cartoonist and Peanuts creator

- Linda Geary (born 1960), painter, educator
- Jean Halpert–Ryden (1919–2011), painter, printmaker
- Stephan Pastis, cartoonist of Pearls Before Swine
- Peter Schifrin (born 1958), Olympic fencer and sculptor
- Charles M. Schulz, creator and cartoonist of Peanuts
- Nancy Speir, children's book illustrator

== Entertainers, actors, musicians ==
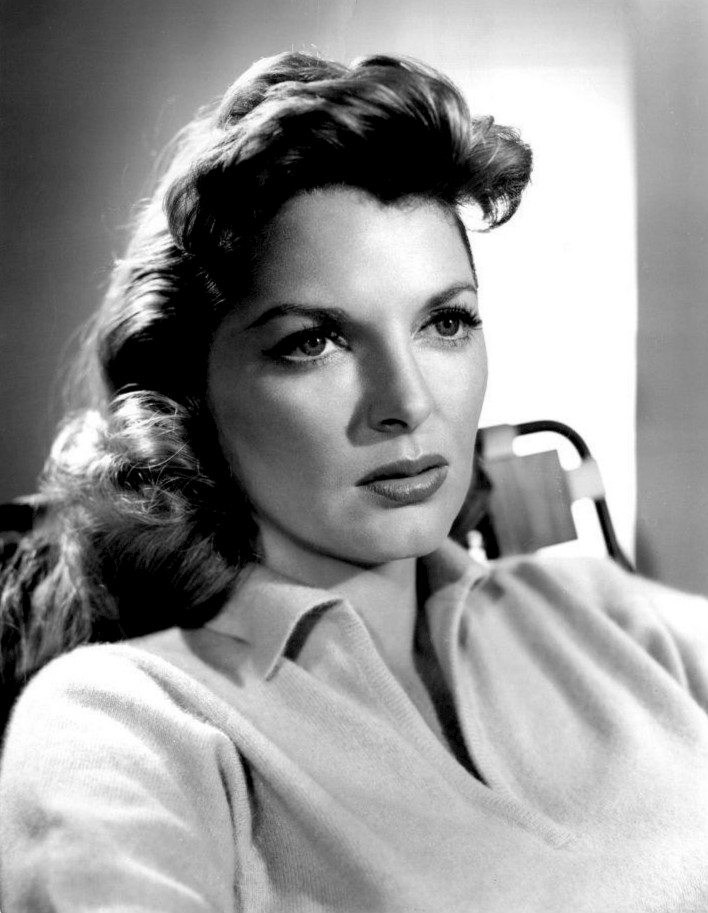
Julie London, singer and actress

- Francis Boggs, actor, writer, and early movie director
- Warren Boyd, television producer, drug counselor
- Chad Channing, drummer for Nirvana
- Eftekhar Dadehbala, Iranian singer, known by her stage name "Mahasti"
- Rebecca De Mornay, film and television actress
- Chris Hayes, musician, member of Huey Lewis and the News
- Dan Hicks, singer and songwriter
- Jesca Hoop, singer and songwriter
- Julian Lage, guitarist and composer
- Julie London, singer and actress
- Kevin Kwan Loucks, concert pianist and arts entrepreneur
- Ray Luv, rapper, native of the South Park and West 9th districts
- Jon Provost, film and television actor
- Jade Puget, guitarist for the band AFI
- Robert Quarry, film and stage actor
- Pete Rugolo, musician
- Auggie Smith, comedian
- Jussie Smollett, actor and singer
- Stephanie St. James, actress, singer, and disease advocate
- Natalie Wood, film actress; lived in Santa Rosa as a child

== Sports ==
- Scott Alexander, MLB player
- Luis Arriaga, soccer player
- Kim Conley, professional distance runner, two-time Olympian in the 5,000m
- Gabe Cramer, baseball pitcher
- Maya DiRado, Olympic swimmer
- Jonathan González, Mexican soccer player
- Sara Hall, American middle distance runner
- Brandon Hyde, manager of the Baltimore Orioles
- Jenna Johnson, Olympic swimmer
- Levi Leipheimer, cyclist and three-time winner of the Tour of California
- Koa Misi, football linebacker
- McKenzie Moore (born 1992), player in the Israeli Basketball Premier League
- Alfonso Motagalvan, soccer player
- Brandon Morrow, Major League Baseball pitcher
- Ernie Nevers, football star
- Tony Renda, baseball player
- David Terrell, fighter
- Stephen Tomasin, plays for United States national rugby sevens team
- Tony Trujillo, skateboarder

== Writers, journalists ==
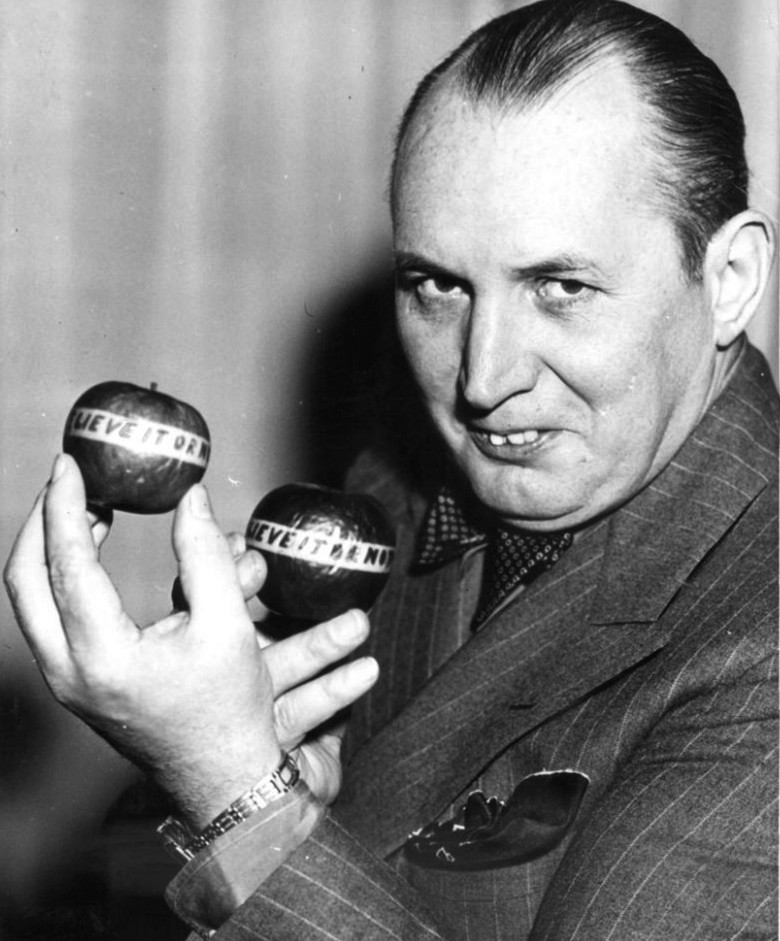
Robert L. Ripley, creator and columnist of Ripley's Believe It or Not

- Jacob Appelbaum, journalist, computer security researcher and hacker
- Shirlee Busbee, writer
- Robert X. Cringely, technology journalist
- Garen Drussai, science fiction writer
- Paul Gilger, author of the musical Showtune
- Richard Heinberg, ecological journalist
- Frank Herbert, science-fiction writer and author of Dune
- Robert L. Ripley, creator and columnist of Ripley's Believe It or Not
- Jim Ross, professional wrestling commentator and executive
- Greg Sarris, author, film producer and screenwriter, professor
- Albino Brown, ska music writer, historian, producer, and director

== Others ==
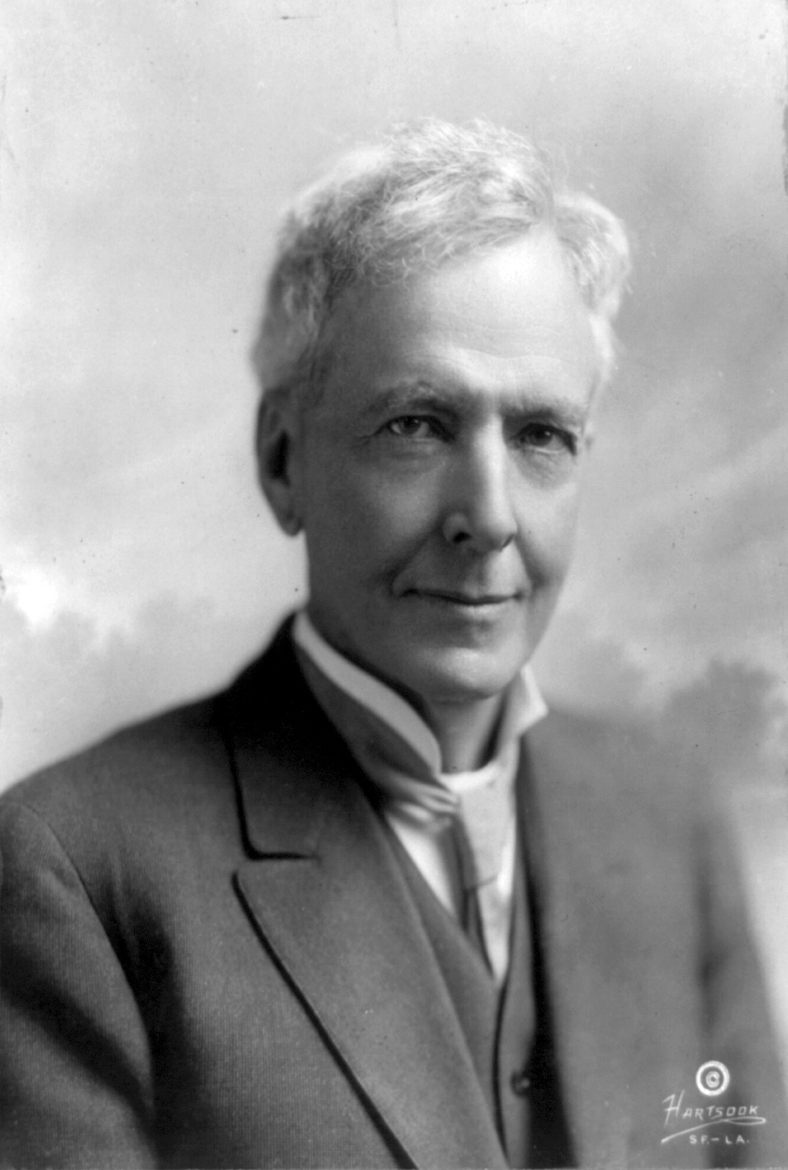
Luther Burbank, horticulturalist

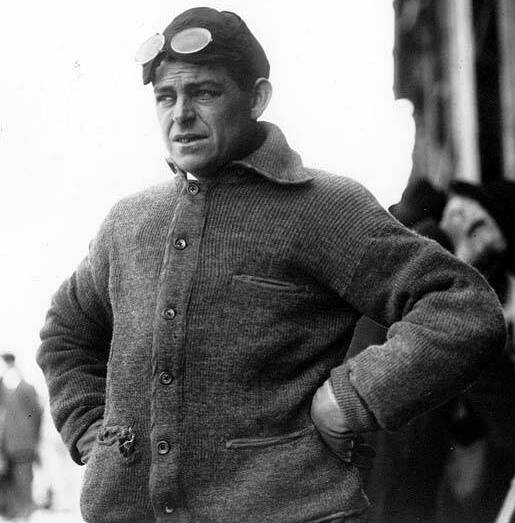
Aviation pioneer Fred J. Wiseman at Olympia "flyer" 1911

- Madeline Bunch, businesswoman
- Luther Burbank, horticulturalist
- Fred J. Wiseman, aviation pioneer and first airmail pilot
- Efren Carrillo, member of Sonoma County Board of Supervisors
- María Ygnacia López de Carrillo, original grantee of Rancho Cabeza de Santa Rosa
- Brett Crozier, Commander of the Theodore Roosevelt
- Frank Pierce Doyle, banker and philanthropist, known as the "Father of the Golden Gate Bridge"
- William Mark Felt, FBI agent and associate director, Watergate informant known as "Deep Throat"
- Guy Fieri, celebrity chef
- Mendy Fry, drag racer
- Thomas Lake Harris, mystic and prophet
- Edward J. Livernash, journalist and Congressman
- Joseph and William Hunt, founders of Hunt's foods
- Vicky Nguyen, television reporter
- Ruth Paine, friend of Marina Oswald
- Michael Robinson, rabbi and activist for civil/human rights
- Robley C. Williams, geneticist
