= Kevin Kwan Loucks =

American musician

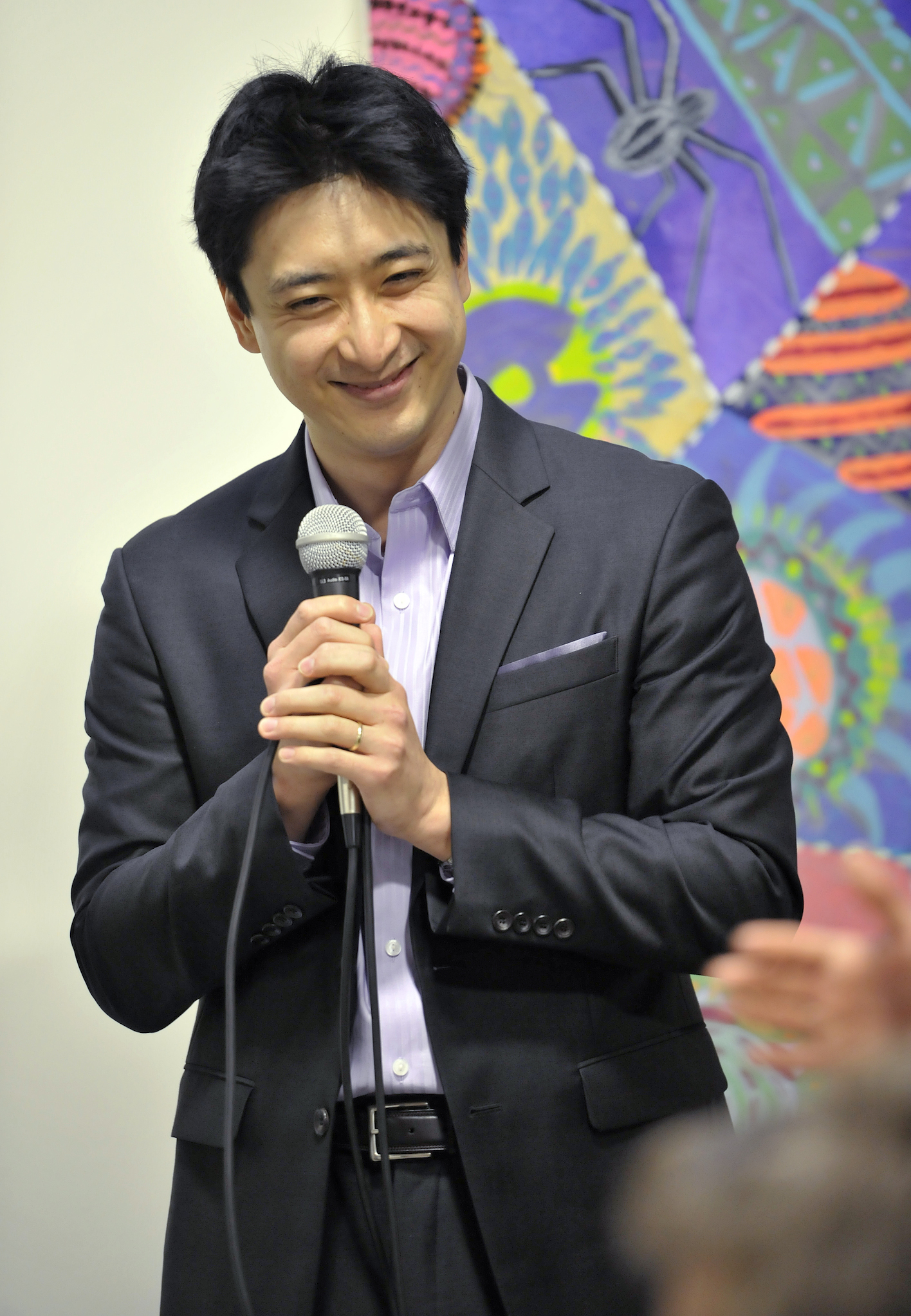
- Pianist Kevin Kwan Loucks Loucks addressing an audience at the Orange County Great Park on March 31, 2012

Background information
- Born: Kevin Kwan Loucks; South Korea
- Genres: Classical
- Occupations: Musician, educator, arts entrepreneur
- Instrument: Piano
- Years active: 2000–present
- Website: www.kevinloucks.com www.trioceleste.com www.chambermusicoc.org

Kevin Kwan Loucks is a Korean–American classical pianist, arts entrepreneur, and nonprofit executive. In September 2021, he was appointed chief executive officer of Chamber Music America in New York City. He previously served as Director of Business Development and Strategic Partnerships at the Philharmonic Society of Orange County, a presenting organization in residence at the Segerstrom Center for the Arts in Costa Mesa, CA, and also served as Director of Innovation and Program Development at Music Academy of the West in Montecito, California. He co-founded Chamber Music | OC, an arts organization headquartered in Lake Forest, California, and is a founding member and current pianist of the award-winning piano trio, Trio Céleste.

== Early life and formal education ==
Loucks, a Korean adoptee, grew up in Santa Rosa, California, where he was active in the instrumental music program as an honors student at Santa Rosa High School. He attended the University of California, Irvine, where he received the Dean's Award for Excellence upon graduating with a bachelor of music degree in 2004. While a student at UC Irvine, Loucks attended the Aspen Music Festival and Music@Menlo where he worked closely with cellist David Finckel and pianist Wu Han. Loucks moved to New York City to continue his piano studies with Julian Martin at The Juilliard School where he studied chamber music with pianists Yoheved Kaplinsky, Seymour Lipkin, and cellist Fred Sherry. At Juilliard, he received the Luba and George Goldberg Prize and the Susan Rose Fellowship before graduating with a master of music degree in 2006.

He took a year off to concertize before enrolling in the doctoral program at Stony Brook University in New York where he served as head of piano for the Pre-College Division and was teaching assistant for the Emerson String Quartet and the university's graduate chamber music department. He worked with pianist Christina Dahl, violinists Pamela Frank and Philippe Graffin, cellist Colin Carr, and the Emerson String Quartet, and was awarded a doctor of musical arts degree from the university in 2014. He was the recipient of the Dean's Fellowship for Professional Activities, the Ackerman Memorial Award for Service in Chamber Music, and the Distinguished Travel Award from Stony Brook's Graduate Student Organization. During his studies at Stony Brook, Loucks also attended programs at The Banff Centre in Canada where he worked with pianists Marc Durand and Robert McDonald.

In 2017, Loucks graduated with an Executive Master of Business Administration degree from the Argyros School of Business and Economics at Chapman University in Orange, California where he studied entrepreneurship, finance, management, and strategy. He completed his executive education at Stanford Graduate School of Business where he studied marketing and innovation, brand management, and digital marketing strategy.

== Performance career ==
Loucks has concertized as both soloist and chamber musician throughout Austria, Canada, the Czech Republic, France, Italy, South Korea, Spain, Thailand, and the United States. He performed as soloist with the Bratislava Chamber Orchestra, the Seoul National University Virtuosi, and the California Chamber Orchestra, and has been featured in prominent international concert venues including Weill Recital Hall and Zankel Hall at Carnegie Hall, Chicago Cultural Center, the Daejeon Cultural and Arts Center, the Kennedy Center, Kumho Art Hall, the Los Angeles County Museum of Art, Lincoln Center's Alice Tully Hall, Martinu Hall in Liechtenstein Palace, Merkin Concert Hall, the Moulin d'Andé, Prösels Castle, IBK Chamber Hall and the Recital Hall at Seoul Arts Center, Soka Performing Arts Center, and BP Hall at Walt Disney Concert Hall.

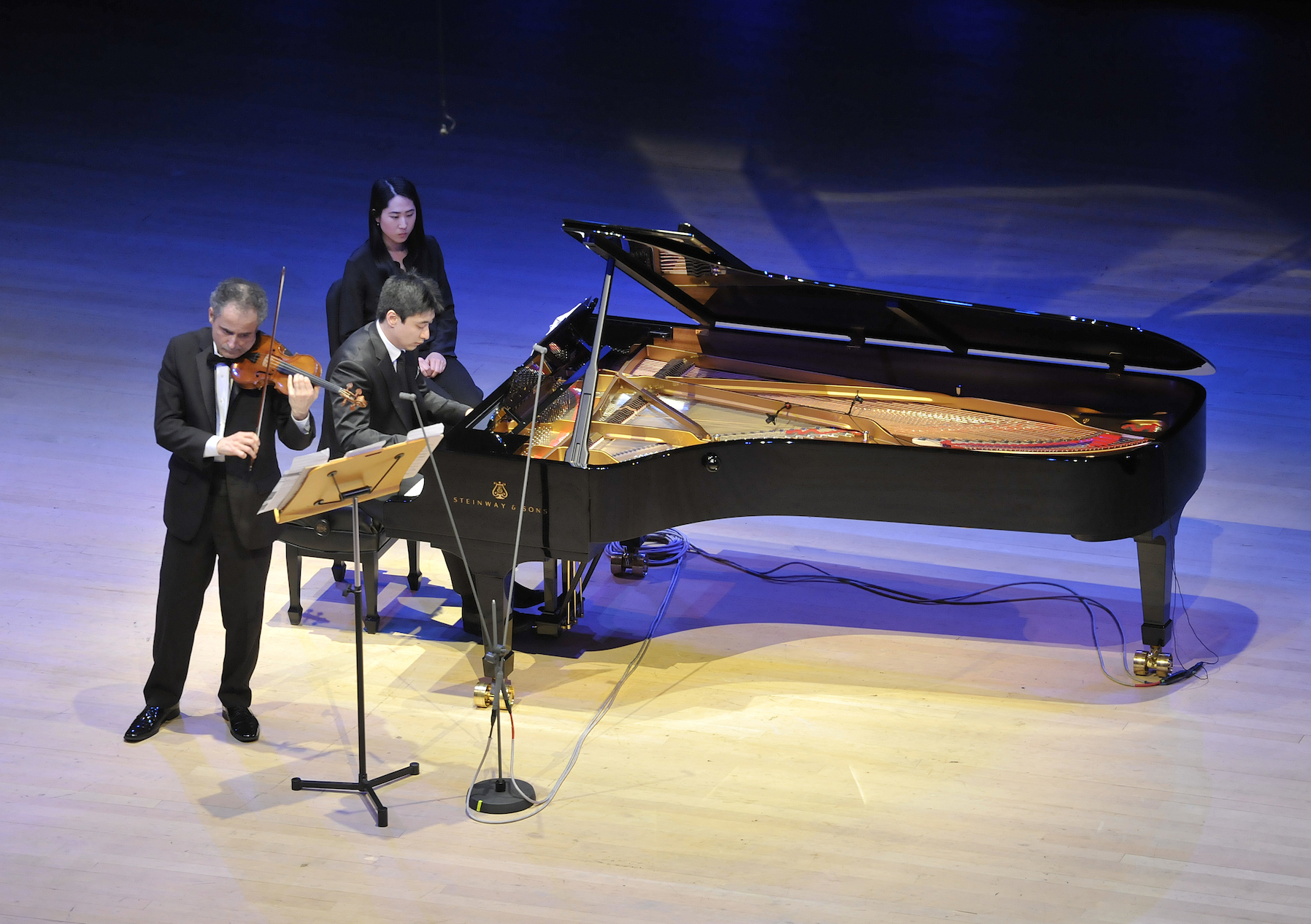
Emerson String Quartet violinist Eugene Drucker and Loucks in recital at Soka Performing Arts Center on February 10, 2014

As a collaborative artist, Loucks has been featured in recital performances with Rachel Barton Pine, Denis Brott, James Campbell, Colin Carr, Paul Coletti, Robert deMaine, Glenn Dicterow, Karen Dreyfus, Eugene Drucker, Philippe Graffin, Alan Kay, Edgar Meyer, Frank Morelli, Johannes Moser, Lara St. John, Kyung Sun Lee, Stephen Prutsman, Roger Tapping, Raphael Wallfisch, Carol Wincenc, and Peter Zazofsky. He has also appeared with numerous ensembles including the Afiara, Argus, Arneis, Beaubliss, Cecilia, Jupiter, Lyris, Rus, and YUL String Quartets, and has performed and recorded as a member of Gruppo Montebello, an All‐Star Ensemble of acclaimed faculty and alumni from The Banff Centre.

=== The Krechkovsky/Loucks Duo ===
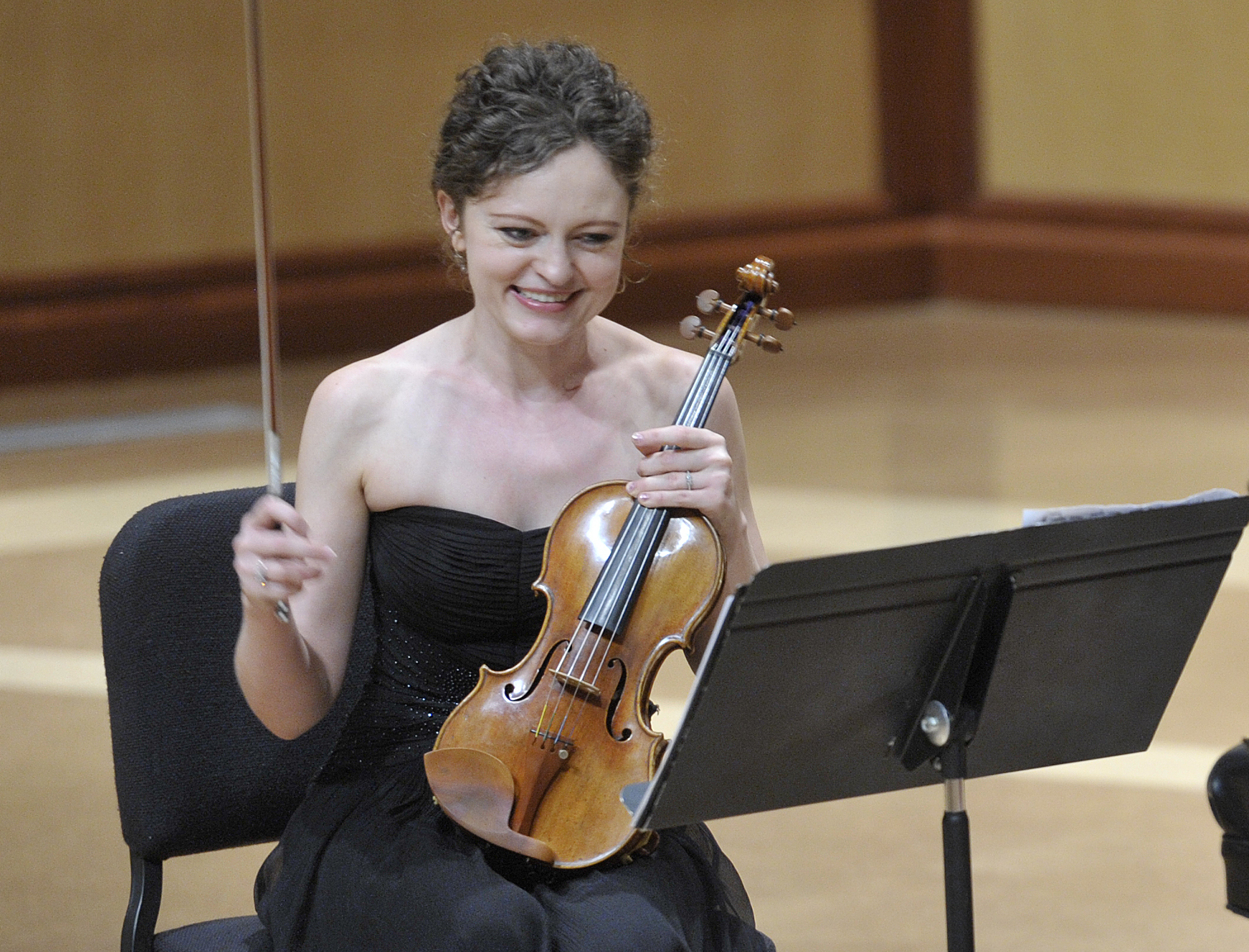
Violinist Iryna Krechkovsky

In 2004 Loucks met concert violinist and future wife Iryna Krechkovsky at a music festival in Italy where the two were scheduled to perform together. Later that year they formed the award-winning Krechkovsky/Loucks Duo and have since performed hundreds of recitals together throughout North America, Europe, and Asia. They have performed the majority of the violin/piano repertoire with particular interest in the music of Bach, Beethoven, Brahms, Corigliano, Debussy, Gershwin, Janacek, Mozart, Saint-Saëns, Szymanowski, and Tchaikovsky. The Duo has also premiered numerous compositions written for them by composers including Samuel Adler and Philip Lasser, and have worked with John Corigliano in New York City.

=== Trio Céleste ===
At the recommendation of pianist Wu Han, Loucks formed Trio Céleste in 2012 with Krechkovsky and cellist Ross Gasworth who performed together with Krechkovsky during their graduate studies at the Cleveland Institute of Music in 2006 and 2007. The trio has since established itself as one of the most active and dynamic chamber music ensembles in the country with major recital performances in Chicago, Cleveland, Los Angeles, New York, San Francisco, Seoul, and Toronto.

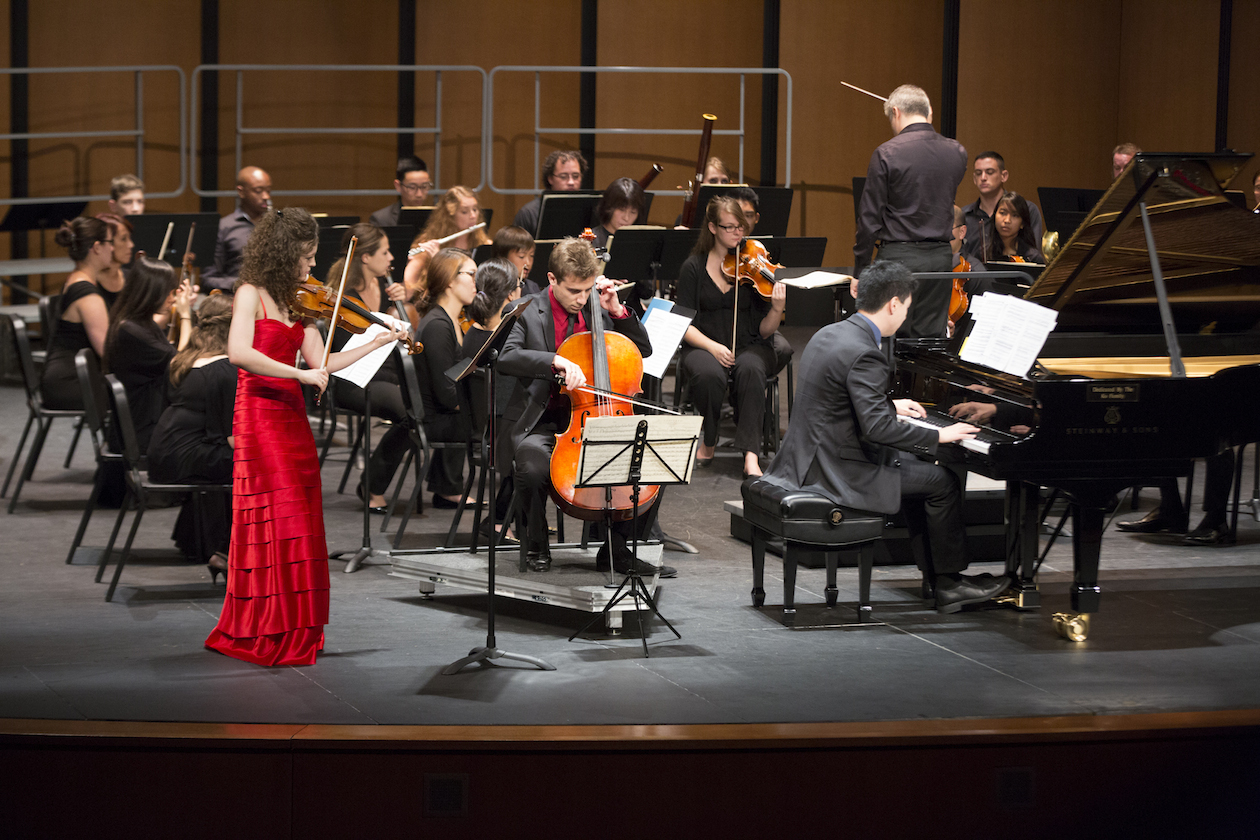
Trio Céleste performing Beethoven's Triple Concerto at the Marcus D. Hurlbut Theater on July 12, 2014

In their inaugural season, Trio Céleste was selected as winners of the prestigious Beverly Hills Auditions in Los Angeles and were appointed Artists-in-Residence at the Claire Trevor School of the Arts at the University of California, Irvine, where they also direct the annual Summer Chamber Music Festival. The ensemble also makes up the core of Chamber Music | OC, both as principal performers and as organizational administrators.

The trio's first major performance project, “The Complete Piano Trios of Ludwig van Beethoven” included three separate performances of the entire piano trio cycle of Beethoven in Irvine, San Francisco, and Toronto, as well as multiple performances of the Triple Concerto with the UC Irvine Symphony Orchestra at the Irvine Barclay Theater and the Capistrano Conductor's Institute Orchestra at the Marcus D. Hurlbut Theater in Southern California. “The American Project” took place in June 2015 featuring world premieres by Christopher Dobrian and jazz flautist Nicole Mitchell as well as established works by John Adams, Samuel Adler, John Corigliano, and Eugene Drucker, and "The Evolution of Ludwig van Beethoven" with music critic Timothy Mangan explored the creative evolution of Beethoven through his music for violin, cello, and piano.

Trio Céleste recorded their debut album with Grammy Award winning recording engineer Jesse Lewis at Soka Performing Arts Center in June 2015. The album, released on the Navona label, debuted at No. 5 on iTunes for new classical music releases, and No. 10 on Amazon.com for chamber music releases and has received critical acclaim from major publications including The Strad who said, "The US West Coast-based Céleste Trio may have been formed only four years ago, but judging from its first disc it has an important career ahead of it...The playing in Beethoven’s early Piano Trio in G major is not only accomplished but unfailingly stylish – crisply turned yet high in character...The second movement is a rapt fusion of slow, pliantly lilting siciliana, prayer-like solemnity and twinkling delicacy. Constellations – ten newly commissioned variations based on the opening theme from the second movement of Beethoven’s Trio – are novel if not all successful...In Dvořák’s ‘Dumky’ Trio, the players contrast sparkling exuberance in the fast sections with heart-rending tragedy in the slow ones – the Poco adagio of the second movement is especially mesmeric in its frozen motion. They vividly realise the composer's ambition to combine the ‘melancholy and delirious joy of life… in the same being’."

The ensemble recorded their second album in June 2018 featuring Beethoven's Archduke Trio and Tchaikovsky Piano Trio in A minor, Op. 50 with recording engineer Louis Ng at Soka Performing Arts Center.

== Professional activities ==
=== International Arts Mentoring Program ===
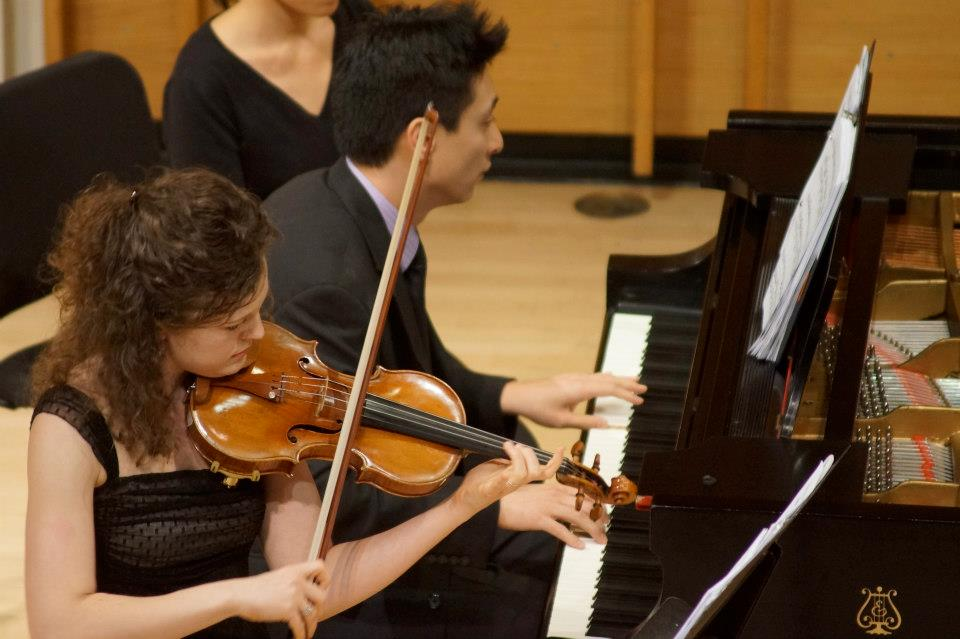
The Krechkovsky/Loucks Duo in recital at Merkin Concert Hall on April 23, 2013

The Education and Culture Association of South Korea created the International Arts Mentoring Project in 2010 to bring music performance and arts education to underprivileged children throughout South Korea. Loucks was invited to lead and direct the artistic operations of the project that included the selection of over fifty student to take part in over two weeks of mentoring and formal concert performances in Busan, Seoul, and Yongin. The program featured private lessons and master classes for pianists and string players, interdisciplinary performance projects with actors and dancers, and a weeklong arts camp that culminated in a formal performance tour of the country.

=== Orange County Great Park ===
In 2011 Loucks was selected as Artist-in-Residence at the Orange County Great Park in Irvine, California. He conceived and developed an eight-concert chamber music series that featured Canadian cellist Denis Brott, Alarm Will Sound clarinetist Bill Kalinkos, The Krechkovsky/Loucks Duo, and Trio Céleste among others. Each individual program included unique interactions with the audience, public workshops, lectures, and special programs for kids. It was through the success of this residency that then Mayor of Irvine, Sukhee Kang, convinced Loucks and Krechkovsky to move to Irvine, California.

=== Chamber Music | OC ===
Launched in 2012 by Loucks and Krechkovsky, Chamber Music | OC is an arts initiative designed to address what Loucks states are many of the complex issues facing performers and audiences alike: "It is a project that embodies the most important elements shaping classical music today – a commitment to the art of performance, educating the next generation of young musicians, and the necessity to contribute to one’s community through the arts.” Krechkovsky currently serves as the organization's Director of Education while Loucks serves as a member of the Pre-College Faculty.

==== Performance ====
The Performance division of Chamber Music | OC provides residents of the greater Orange County area with world-class chamber music performances presented by rising stars and established veterans in the classical music world. Distinguished guest artists have included the Argus Quartet, Colin Carr, cello; Yuri Cho, violin; Paul Coletti, viola; Robert deMaine, cello; Glenn Dicterow, violin; Karen Dreyfus, viola; Eugene Drucker, violin; Grace Fong, piano; Philippe Graffin, violin; the Jupiter String Quartet; Alan Kay, clarinet; Kyung Sun Lee, violin; the Lyris Quartet; Julian Martin, piano; Robert McDonald, piano; David Samuel, viola; Philip Setzer, violin; Trio Céleste; Ben Ullery, viola; and William VerMeulen, horn. In 2017, Chamber Music | OC celebrated its 5-year anniversary with a sold-out Carnegie Hall debut recital at Zankel Hall featuring the world premiere of a new concerto grosso by composer Paul Dooley featuring Trio Céleste and some of the organization's former guest artist.

==== Education ====
The Education division of Chamber Music | OC is anchored by the Pre-College Program (formerly the Young Artist Program) and was previously in residence at Chapman University in Orange, California. The program provides a unique and comprehensive musical education that features chamber music coachings and performance classes, musicianship, composition, ear training, career development and college preparation, participation in distinguished guest artist master classes, community outreach performances, and the Rising Stars Recital Series. Select members and alumni from the Program appeared in Carnegie Hall in April 2017, and have since gone on to pursue their studies at the Eastman School of Music, The Juilliard School, Northwestern University, the Peabody Institute of Music, Princeton University, Rice University, the San Francisco Conservatory of Music, and Stanford University, among others.

==== Community ====
The Community Outreach Division of Chamber Music | OC aspires to make the benefits of music widely accessible through collaborations with local schools and community organizations. The program offers a range of single- and multi- session workshops and performances designed to give participants the opportunity to enjoy and learn about how music can positively affect their well-being. Partnering organizations include the Irvine Adult Day Health Services, Human Options, Orange County Academy of Sciences and Arts, Orange County Children's Therapeutic Art Center, Rejoice Center, Santa Ana High School, and University Synagogue in Irvine.

==== Grand Canyon Residency ====
In 2013, Chamber Music | OC was selected from over five hundred applicants to be Artists-in-Residence at the Grand Canyon National Park. Then directors Iryna Krechkovsky, Michelle Gasworth, Ross Gasworth, and Loucks participated in performances, public master classes, and led educational outreach projects throughout the South Rim in August 2014.

==== COVID-19 pandemic and new headquarters ====
During the COVID-19 pandemic, Chamber Music | OC's Pre-College Program successfully shifted to a virtual model that prompted the LA Times to write, "Gatherings or no gatherings, Chamber Music OC is keeping classical music going in Orange County." The pandemic also prompted the organization to formulate a new strategic plan that would enable the organization to self-produce innovative artistic content, invest in technology to expand organizational reach, scale its thriving Pre-College Program, and explore and implement new business models.

On August 11, 2020, Chamber Music | OC purchased a 4,000-square-foot commercial property that was repurposed to help address these needs. The facility includes the 1,200-square-foot Weinstein Performance Space, a recording studio, rehearsal spaces, administrative offices, and various common areas.

==== Upcoming 10-Year Anniversary Season ====
To kick off its 10-year anniversary season, Chamber Music | OC announced that it was named a commissioning partner for the Kronos Quartet’s 50 for the Future project. This collaboration will bring members of the Quartet to Orange County to interact with participants of the Pre-College Program, and will also feature special performance collaborations with students and Chamber Music | OC principals. Other anniversary initiatives include a new concert series at the Weinstein Performance Space, new partnerships with major Southern California arts organizations, and a concert celebration at Walt Disney Concert Hall in July 2022.

=== Chamber Music America ===
After an extensive national search, Chamber Music America, the national network of ensemble music professionals, named Loucks as its new Chief Executive Officer effective September 1, 2021. The organization provides access to professional resources and benefits, professional development seminars, grants and awards, and a national conference hosted annually in New York City. The membership community is made up of thousands of artists, educators, managers, presenters, and organizations, and represent all fifty states. Loucks is tasked with providing leadership and strategic vision that will enable the organization to achieve its artistic, financial, and organizational goals. He also serves as an ex-officio member of the Board of Directors.

== Awards and recognition ==
Loucks has been called "impeccable" by La Presse, Montreal; "a shining talent" by Völser Zeitung, Italy; and a pianist of “exhilarating polish, unity and engagement” by the Orange County Register, California. He has been featured in live performances on National Public Radio's Performance Today, CBC Radio 2, KUSC, WFMT, the Public Broadcasting Service, KABC-TV Los Angeles, and the Korean Broadcasting System. He was a top prize winner at the Schlern International Competition in Italy, the International Chamber Music Ensemble Competition in Boston, the Beverly Hills Auditions in Los Angeles on two separate occasions, the Music Teachers' Association of California Duo-Piano Competition, the American Prize in Piano Performance, and the Emerging Artist Award from Arts Orange County.

Loucks was named one of Orange County's most influential people by OC Weekly in March 2015 and in 2018, was nominated for the Excellence in Entrepreneurship Award by the Orange County Business Journal. In 2019, he received special recognition from the California State Legislature for the creation and development of the Sing! Program at Music Academy of the West.

== Personal ==
Loucks resides in Brooklyn, New York and Irvine, California with his wife and musical partner, violinist Iryna Krechkovsky. He is an avid outdoorsman having earned his Eagle Scout in 2000.
