= Santa Rosa High School (Santa Rosa, California) =

Secondary school in California, US

Coordinates: 38°27′07″N 122°43′06″W

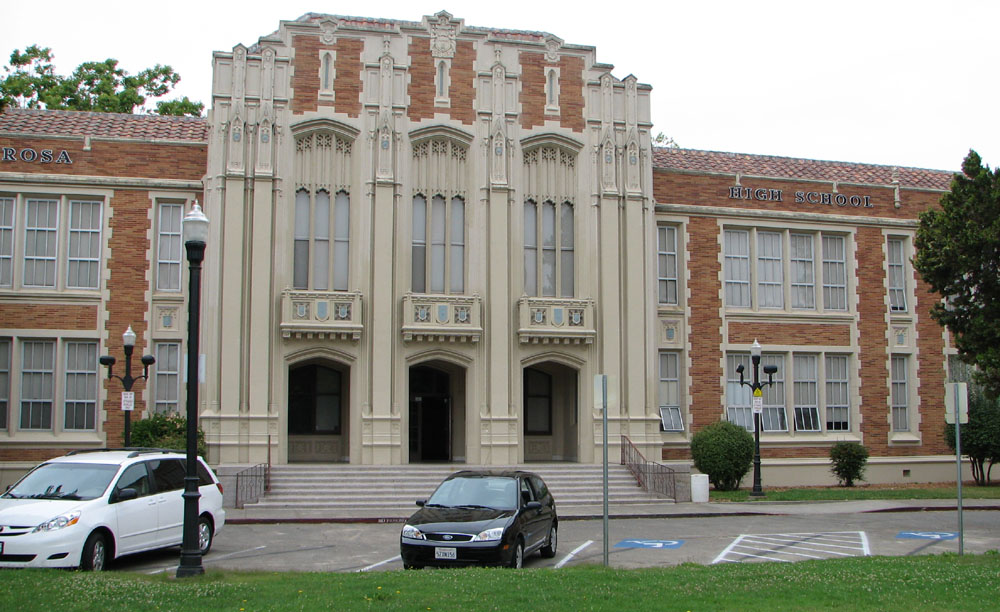

Location
- 1235 Mendocino Ave; Santa Rosa, California 95401; United States

Information
- Type: Public secondary
- Established: 1874
- Principal: Kimberly Clissold
- Teaching staff: 84.20 (FTE)
- Enrollment: 1,636 (2023-2024)
- Student to teacher ratio: 19.43
- Colors: Orange and black
- Mascot: Panther
- Website: https://srhs.srcschools.org

Santa Rosa High School (SRHS) & Santa Rosa Junior High School are secondary schools located in Santa Rosa, California. It is part of the Santa Rosa City High School District, which is part of Santa Rosa City Schools.

== History ==
SRHS was the only public high school in Santa Rosa from 1874 to 1958. Santa Rosa Junior College (SRJC), located on the adjacent property, was a part of Santa Rosa High School from 1918 to 1927.

The school had several locations. The previous location on Humboldt Street burned to the ground in 1921. The school was moved to its current location and opened in 1924. The school's current Brick Gothic design was created by W. H. Weeks in 1922.

In 2011, Santa Rosa High School received the California Distinguished School and the California Career Technical Awards.

In 2015, Santa Rosa High School received the California Gold Ribbon Award, which replaced the California Distinguished Schools Award as the highest award a school can receive from the state of California.

In February 2025, the Santa Rosa City School District Board decided to make Santa Rosa High School into a K7-12 school taking in middle schoolers who were expected to go to Santa Rosa Middle School by June 2026.

Starting the 2025 - 2026 school year, Santa Rosa Middle School transitioned onto Santa Rosa High School's campus becoming Santa Rosa Junior High. The Junior High embodies DeSoto Hall on-campus.

=== Nevers Field ===
Ernie Nevers attended Santa Rosa High School, where he excelled in football. In 1920, as a senior, he led the team to the NCS Championships. He went on to attend Stanford University, and play for the Duluth Eskimos and the Chicago Cardinals of the National Football League. In 1925 the football field at Santa Rosa High School was renamed Nevers Field in his honor. In 2004, just in time for the homecoming game, a $2 million refurbishment of Nevers Field was completed. The improvements included an artificial turf, an all-weather 8-lane track, new bleachers, a snack bar and ticket booth, restrooms, and lights for night games.

== Curriculum ==
Santa Rosa High School also offers Advanced Placement (AP) courses and exams meaning the school has met the College Board's requirements to offer college-level courses to high school students.

Santa Rosa High School is involved in a dual-enrollment program with Santa Rosa Junior College allowing students to take junior college courses for college and high school credits.

== Extracurricular Activities ==
=== Sports ===
Santa Rosa High School has various athletic programs and competes in the 5-A North Bay League of the North Coast Section of the California Interscholastic Federation. The teams are known as the Santa Rosa Panthers. Sports offered include football, volleyball, cross country, tennis, golf, basketball, wrestling, soccer, baseball, softball, track and field, badminton, and swimming. The cross country varsity boys team was the undefeated league champions, a record of 7-0, in the 2008-2009 season. In the 2016 swim season, both men's and women's varsity teams were undefeated with 7-0 records. In the 2017 school season, the boys team was similarly undefeated.

=== ArtQuest ===
ArtQuest is a magnet program for Santa Rosa High School that allows students to take classes with a focus on the arts. ArtQuest has specialty coursework in visual fine arts, dance, theatre arts, photography, instrumental and vocal music, digital arts, and video.

=== School Newspaper ===
Santa Rosa High School has a journalism class that produces newspapers about once a month is entitled The Santa Rosan.

=== Clubs ===
Santa Rosa High School has several student-organized and teacher-supervised clubs, ranging from many different subjects. Every year there is a club day for students to represent their clubs with the help of their teacher advisor and their department.

=== Foundation ===
The Santa Rosa High School Foundation is a group of alumni who take an active interest in SRHS. The Foundation helps raise money for school programs and other services.

== In popular culture ==
Santa Rosa High School was used as a filming location for several Hollywood films, including Peggy Sue Got Married (1986) and Inventing the Abbotts (1997).

Director Wes Craven applied for the use of Santa Rosa High School and reached a verbal agreement with the principal of the school for the filming of his 1996 horror film Scream. Just days before filming was to begin, the school board denied permission for the use of the school. In response, following the listing of organizations and individuals whom the filmmakers wished to thank in the closing credits of Scream, Craven included the note, "No thanks whatsoever to the Santa Rosa City School District Governing Board".

== Demographics ==
=== 2023-2024 ===
- 1,636 students:

Hispanic	African American	Asian	Pacific Islander	White, non-Hispanic	Multiracial	American Indian
48.7%	1.6%	2.9%	0.4%	37.7%	7.0%	0.7%

== Notable alumni ==
- Morgan Bertsch (born 1997), basketball player
- Doug Camilli (born 1936), baseball catcher
- Efren Carrillo, two-time member of the Sonoma County Board of Supervisors
- Tim Cossins (born 1970), baseball coach
- Gabe Cramer (born 1994), Israeli-Canadian-American baseball pitcher
- Brett E. Crozier, class of 1988, United States Navy Captain
- Daniel Farrands, class of 1987, producer and screenwriter of Halloween: The Curse of Michael Myers and The Haunting in Connecticut
- Chuck Girard, class of 1961, rock and roll recording artist, formed The Castells during his time at Santa Rosa High School. Love Song
- Herbert N. Hultgren, Professor of Medicine (Cardiovascular) Emeritus, Stanford Medical School, high-altitude medicine pioneer and researcher
- Kevin Kwan Loucks, class of 2000, CEO of Chamber Music America.
- Hector Andres Negroni, Air Force fighter pilot, aerospace defense executive, historian
- Ernie Nevers, Pro Football Hall of Fame fullback who played for Duluth Eskimos and Chicago Cardinals of National Football League, major league baseball player
- Robert Ripley, cartoonist and creator of Ripley's Believe It or Not!
- Rolando Toyos, ophthalmologist who developed intense pulsed light treatment for eye conditions
- Peter Schmidt, class of 1961, archaeologist of Africa, fellow of the World Academy of Art and Science, Professor of Anthropology—Brown University and University of Florida. Author and editor of 15 books on African archaeology and heritage.

== Notable faculty ==
- Edward Von der Porten (1933–2018) early nautical archaeologist; expert on Sir Francis Drake's visit to New Albion in 1579; expert in early Chinese export porcelains; author on the German Navy in WW II, Francis Drake and Chinese porcelains. Led efforts leading to the Drakes Bay National Historic and Archeological National Historic Landmark in 2012.

== See also ==
- List of school districts in Sonoma County, California
