= Lyric Suite for Sextet =

Studio album by Chick Corea and Gary Burton
- Released: September 1983
- Recorded: September 1982
- Studio: Mad Hatter, Los Angeles, California
- Genre: Jazz
- Length: 39:38
- Label: ECM 1260
- Producer: Manfred Eicher

Chick Corea chronology
Again and Again (1983)	Lyric Suite for Sextet (1983)	On Two Pianos (1983)

Gary Burton chronology
Picture This (1982)	Lyric Suite for Sextet (1983)	Real Life Hits (1985)

Lyric Suite for Sextet is an album by piano–vibraphone duo Chick Corea and Gary Burton, recorded in September 1982 and released on ECM a year later—the duo's third studio recording, following Crystal Silence (1972) and Duet (1978). The sextet features the pair accompanied by a string quartet comprising violinists Ik-Hwan Bae and Carol Shrive, violist Karen Dreyfus, and cellist Fred Sherry.

== Reception ==
The AllMusic review by Dave Connolly stated: "If you enjoy jazz/classical hybrids, which are by their nature intellectual pursuits, than this music should pique your interest. However, better to think of this as a duet with some string support than a sextet of equal partners."

Professional ratings
Review scores
Source	Rating
AllMusic	2.5/5 stars
The Penguin Guide to Jazz Recordings	3/4 stars

== Track listing ==
All compositions by Chick Corea

1. "Part 1 - Overture" - 6:25
2. "Part 2 - Waltz" - 7:11
3. "Part 3 - Sketch (For Thelonious Monk)" - 2:13
4. "Part 4 - Roller Coaster" - 1:25
5. "Part 5 - Brasilia" - 7:57
6. "Part 6 - Dream" - 10:33
7. "Part 7 - Finale" - 3:54

== Personnel ==
- Chick Corea – piano
- Gary Burton – vibraphone
- Ik-Hwan Bae – violin
- Carol Shrive – violin
- Karen Dreyfus – viola
- Fred Sherry – cello
