= Herbert Hultgren =

American cardiologist and professor

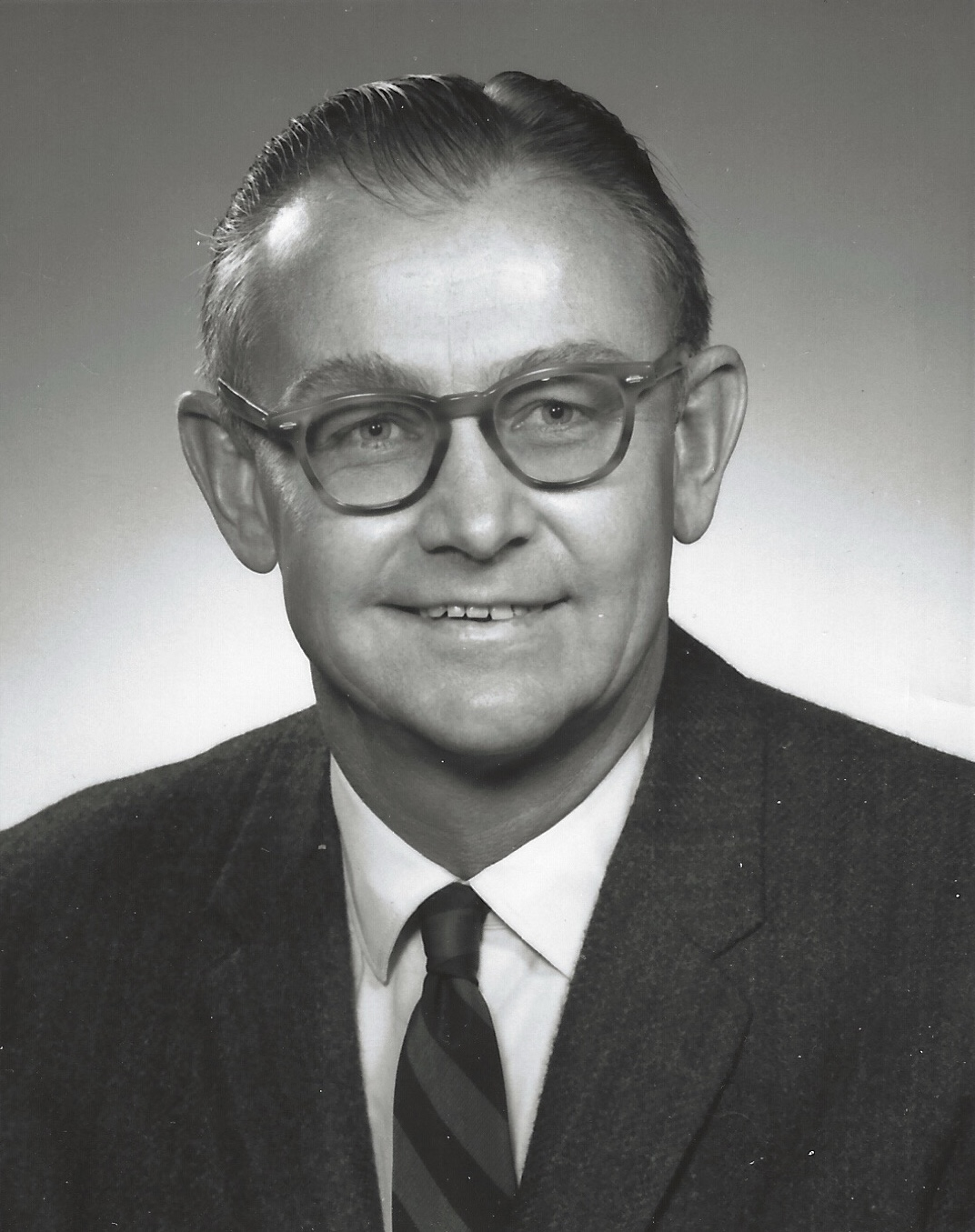
- Herbert Hultgren.
- Born: August 29, 1917; Santa Rosa, CA, U.S.
- Died: October 18, 1997 (aged 80)
- Education: Stanford University, Stanford University School of Medicine
- Known for: Cardiology, high altitude medical research
- Scientific career
- Fields: Cardiology
- Workplaces: Stanford University

Herbert Nils Hultgren (August 29, 1917 – October 18, 1997) was an American Stanford Medical School cardiologist, researcher, teacher, author, professor of Medicine (Cardiology) Emeritus, and worldwide pioneer in the study of high altitude medicine. He was the 1990 recipient of the distinguished Albion Walter Hewlett Award and author of the acclaimed 1997 text High Altitude Medicine.

== Early life and education ==
Hultgren was born in 1917 in Santa Rosa, California, the son of Swedish immigrants Adolf and Hilda Hultgren. He attended Santa Rosa public schools. In 1932, Hultgren became the youngest Eagle Scout ever recognized in the state of California. At Santa Rosa High School, he was a straight A student and member of the debate team. Following high school, he enrolled at Santa Rosa Junior College, where he competed on the swimming and track & field teams and graduated with academic honors. He was an avid reader at a young age, excelled at science and math, and before electronic calculators, was a master of the infamous slide rule.

In 1937, Hultgren was accepted to Stanford University. He earned his Bachelor of Arts in Basic Medical Sciences from Stanford, graduating Phi Beta Kappa in 1939 and received an M.D. from the Stanford University School of Medicine in 1943. He completed an internal medicine residency at Stanford before serving in the United States Army Medical Corps in Europe in 1944–45. He returned to Stanford for a pathology residency in 1946 and then spent a year as a research fellow in cardiology at the Thorndike Memorial Laboratory at the Harvard Medical School in Boston, Massachusetts.

== Cardiology career ==
In 1948, Hultgren (or "Herb," as he was known to colleagues and friends) was hired to teach at the Stanford University School of Medicine. He was the first member of the Medical School faculty to specialize in the quickly evolving field of Cardiology, and he founded the school's Division of Cardiology.

Hultgren was an early advocate of cardiac catherization, which significantly enhanced the diagnosis of cardiovascular disease. He designed and established the first cardiac catheterization laboratory in Northern California. In 1955, Stanford named him Chief of Cardiology.

In 1959, Stanford reorganized their School of Medicine and relocated its operations from San Francisco to a new medical center on the Stanford University campus. The revamped program featured a full-time faculty and redirection and commitment to research. Hultgren was instrumental in planning and ensuring the success of the move and implementing the school's new focus and strategic direction.

Hultgren served as the Chief of Cardiology at the Palo Alto Veterans Administration Medical Center for 17 years beginning in 1967. In 1972, NASA hired him to serve as one of two cardiology consultants to the Apollo 16 space mission, a cautionary measure adopted by the space agency after multiple Apollo 15 astronauts had suffered arrhythmia and loss of potassium while on the Moon the previous year. In 1983, Stanford named him Professor of Medicine (Cardiology) Emeritus. Throughout his career, Hultgren received significant national recognition for his investigative research into the treatment of coronary artery disease (CAD).

== High altitude medicine pioneer ==
While at Stanford in the 1950s, Hultgren developed a research interest in the pathophysiology of congenital heart disease, specifically the problem of reduced oxygen in the arterial blood and its relationship to the physiology of the circulation of the blood through the lungs. He decided to couple this interest with his lifelong love and pursuit of climbing. He was an experienced outdoorsman and skilled mountaineer. In addition to the Sierra Nevada, Cascades, and Rockies, he climbed in Alaska, the Alps, Mexico, Ecuador, Peru, and the Himalayas.

During a trip to the Peruvian Andes in 1959, Hultgren encountered the condition of high altitude pulmonary edema (HAPE), which was relatively unknown at the time and yet to be described in U.S. medical literature. In 1961, he was the first American researcher to define the clinical effects of this altitude sickness, which he presented that year at the annual meeting of the Western Association of Physicians in Carmel, California. High altitude medicine and HAPE became his primary research interest for the remainder of his career. During the next 10 years, he made many trips to the Chulec General Hospital in the Peruvian Andes city of La Oroya (12,300 ft) to study HAPE, chronicling his findings in multiple U.S. academic medical publications.

Following his Andes excursions, Hultgren continued his study of high altitude illnesses at the White Mountain Barcroft Research Lab in the Sierra Nevada, on the peaks around Leadville, Colorado, and at the Mount Everest Base Camp in Nepal. In 1997, his extensive journey of worldwide breakthrough study and research was documented in the publication and release of his book High Altitude Medicine. It is widely considered the definitive text on the clinical aspects of common altitude illnesses.

== Recognition, awards, and publications ==
In the early 1960s, Hultgren co-founded the Association of University Cardiologists, becoming its president in 1970. In 1970–71, he served as president of the Western Association of Physicians. From 1972 to 1975, he was chairman of the Sub-Specialty Board of Cardiovascular Disease of the American Board of Internal Medicine. He belonged to the American Alpine Club (AAC) for 34 years and was chairman of its Medical Committee from 1974 to 1980. In addition, Hultgren served as an active member and officer on over 15 national cardiology and internal medicine associations, boards and committees.

He was a member of the International Society for Mountain Medicine (ISMM) as well as the Wilderness Medical Society (WMS), receiving a Founders Award from the latter in 1995. He was an advisor and instructor for Mountain Travel Medical Seminars (MTMS) in Alaska, Patagonia, and Nepal, and was a lifelong member, advocate, and supporter of the Sierra Club, California Academy of Sciences, and the Sempervirens Fund. In addition to his book High Altitude Medicine, Hultgren authored more than 300 scientific articles and abstracts and 30 book chapters.

In 1990, Hultgren received the Albion Walter Hewlett Award, an honor bestowed by his fellow Stanford Medical School faculty members for "the physician of care and skill who has committed to discovering and using biologic knowledge, wisdom, and compassion to return patients to productive lives." As part of the awards ceremony, Hultgren conducted Grand Rounds at the Stanford Medical Center, and was introduced at the presentation by his longtime friend and heart transplant pioneer, Dr. Norman Shumway.

In 2003, Hultgren's wife, Barbara, donated his research papers to the Mandeville Special Collections Library at the University of California, San Diego (UCSD), where they are available to the medical community. The "Herbert Hultgren Papers" comprise original notes, notebooks, travel logs, correspondence, article drafts, and experiment, test, and patient observation data from Hultgren's multi-decade research and study of high altitude medicine and physiology. They also contain a complete set of his extensive U.S. medical journal article reprints.

== Mountaineering and environmentalism ==
Hultgren has been to the Sierra Nevada Mountains. Beginning as an undergraduate student at Stanford, he spent nearly 60 years hiking, backpacking, camping, climbing, fishing, and skiing there. He climbed and backpacked extensively in Yosemite, Sequoia, Kings Canyon, and Lassen National Parks. He scaled all of California's 14ers (peaks with at least 14,000 feet of elevation), as well as Mount Rainier (WA), Mount Hood (OR), Mount Lassen (CA), all decades before smartphones, mountaineering apps, and GPS.

As an ardent student of natural history, he taught himself and learned the names of every common native Sierra Nevada species of mammal, reptile, bird, fish, tree, plant, and wildflower. Hultgren was so captivated by the Sierra that he considered joining the U.S. Forest Service following graduation from Stanford, before ultimately deciding to pursue a career in medicine.

During his service as a Scoutmaster in the 1960s, he introduced scores of young men to the Sierra Nevada, teaching respect for nature, conservation, and sustainability. Hultgren was a fierce environmentalist. Among his favorite pursuits was an annual two-week Boy Scout troop backpack trip, crossing the Sierra Nevada from east to west and traversing sections of the John Muir Trail. In his later years, he met and became friends with former United States Secretary of Defense Robert McNamara, with whom he shared numerous Sierra treks.

== Family life ==
In 1948, Hultgren married fellow Stanford University alum Barbara Ann Brooke of Pasadena, California. After initially settling in San Francisco, the couple moved to Mill Valley, CA in 1951. When the Stanford Medical School relocated in 1959, they built a home on the Stanford campus, where they raised their family. Hultgren and his wife had three sons: Peter (1952), Bruce (1953), and John (1957)

== Career and death ==
Hultgren passed in October 1997 at the young age of 80 following a fearless battle with acute myeloid leukemia (AML).
