= Grand Ronde =

Grand Ronde or Grande Ronde may refer to:

- Grand Ronde, Oregon, a place in Oregon, U.S.
- Confederated Tribes of the Grand Ronde Community of Oregon, a group of twenty-seven Native American tribes
  - Grand Ronde Community, an Indian reservation in Oregon, U.S.
- Grande Ronde River, Oregon, U.S.
  - Grande Ronde Valley
- Grande Ronde Hospital, in La Grande, Oregon, U.S.
- Grande Ronde basalt, a member of the Columbia River basalt group
- Grande Ronde Aquifer

== See also ==
- Grand Rounds (disambiguation)
