= The Cleaner (American TV series) =

- Genre: Action; Drama
- Created by: Jonathan Prince; Robert Munic
- Starring: Benjamin Bratt; Brett DelBuono; Liliana Mumy; Grace Park; Esteban Powell; Amy Price-Francis; Kevin Michael Richardson
- Country of origin: United States
- Original language: English
- No. of seasons: 2
- No. of episodes: 26

Production
- Executive producers: Jonathan Prince; Robert Munic
- Producer: Tony Palermo
- Running time: 45 minutes
- Production companies: Once a Frog Productions; CBS Productions

Original release
- Network: A&E
- Release: July 15, 2008 – September 15, 2009

The Cleaner is an A&E television series starring Benjamin Bratt. It debuted on July 15, 2008 and the last episode aired on September 15, 2009, when the show was officially cancelled.

It was produced by Once a Frog Productions and CBS Productions.

== Synopsis ==
William Banks is a recovering drug addict who lives in Los Angeles. When his daughter Lula was born, Banks "made a deal with God", pledging that if he is given a second chance, he will end his drug abuse and help others end their addictions to drugs and alcohol. Banks and his small team of recovering addicts begin to work to help others in recovering from their addictions. They will resort to unethical and illegal tactics in order to end their clients' addictions.

Doing this gains respect from other members of the LAPD, some turning a blind eye to the vigilante's methods and refers clients over to Banks, who subsequently believes that his work is a calling so he decides to work pro bono if a client cannot afford to pay for the services he offers.

Banks has a busy life; besides his addiction fighting capers, he runs a shop that primarily sells surfing equipment. His shop is connected to a garage where his business repairs automobiles and surfboards. Besides that he also works at a drug rehabilitation center called Transitions.

Each episode typically begins with Banks having a one-way conversation with God (or "talking", as he refers to it), usually asking for guidance and clarity on his mission, the meaning of life and human nature, among other things. Other times Banks will air his grievances to God, asking why He allows bad things to happen. William's one-way communications with God are somewhat of a theme during the series, implying that his faith plays an important role in his sobriety. However, whether all the scenes where Banks is shown praying out loud to God are real or whether they are simply illustrations of what is going on in his mind, are left ambiguous to the viewers.

The show's intro states that Banks also helps people overcome addictions to sex and gambling, however, neither one was the focus of an episode.

== Production ==
The Cleaner, whose protagonist, according to A&E, helps others defeat their habits "by any means necessary", is the first original drama for this cable network in over six years. The show is loosely based on the life of Warren Boyd who, as an addictions counselor, has helped such people as Mel Gibson, Courtney Love, and Whitney Houston. On October 27, 2008, A&E declared they would pick up a second season of The Cleaner. It went into production of thirteen all-new episodes, and premiered on June 23, 2009. A&E opted not to renew the series for a third season on September 25, 2009.

== Cast ==
- Benjamin Bratt as William Banks
- Grace Park as Akani Cuesta
- Esteban Powell as Arnie Swenton
- Kevin Michael Richardson as Darnell McDowell (season 1)
- Amy Price-Francis as Melissa Banks, William's wife
- Liliana Mumy as Lula Banks, William's daughter
- Brett DelBuono as Ben Banks, William's son

== Main crew ==
- Steve Boyum
- Félix Enríquez Alcalá (2 episodes, 2008)
- Leon Ichaso (2 episodes, 2008)
- Robert Munic (13 episodes, 2008)
- Jonathan Prince (head writer)

== Episodes ==
=== Series overview ===
| Season | Episodes | Originally aired | |
| Season | Episodes | First aired | Last aired |
|---|---|---|---|
| 1 | 13 | July 15, 2008 | October 14, 2008 |
| 2 | 13 | June 23, 2009 | September 15, 2009 |

=== Season 1 (2008) ===
| No. overall | No. in season | Title | Original release date |
|---|---|---|---|
| 1 | 1 | "Pilot" | July 15, 2008 |
William tries to help Zachary Giles (James Immekus), a once-promising high school athlete who has fallen victim to methamphetamine addiction. Giles funds his addiction by stealing from his family and heisting people's homes with his girlfriend Heather (Hazel Dean), who is also an addict. In order to save Giles, William must go to battle with a ruthless Aryan supremacist (Michael Cudlitz) that supplies people with drugs in exchange for stolen merchandise. This episode introduces William's team and his family. The episode ends with one of William's team members embarking on a heavy binge with fatal results.
| 2 | 2 | "Rag Dolls" | July 22, 2008 |
Irene Kemp (Kathleen Wilhoite) is the mother of a teenage surfer girl (Alona Tal) who exhibits signs of a drug habit--except her drug tests keep coming up clean. William, driven to investigate, discovers that the girl and her friend Lolly (Vanessa Lengies) are drug mules, transporting heroin over the U.S.-Mexico border.
| 3 | 3 | "Meet the Joneses" | July 29, 2008 |
A lawyer (Tate Donovan) comes to William, seeking help for his wife (Annabeth Gish), who is caught in the throes of an addiction to Vicodin and zolpidem. William and his team discover that the woman is not only using, but she is also part of an elaborate upper middle class "drug club". The title of this episode is a play on "Jonesing", which is slang for delirium tremens, which is a painful episode that an addict typically experiences during a withdrawal from drugs and/or alcohol.
| 4 | 4 | "Chaos Theory" | August 5, 2008 |
A mathematics professor (Neil Hopkins), in a race against time to publish his research, turns to cocaine. His colleague and girlfriend (Susan May Pratt) seeks William's help. William invites some friends over to his house including his former sponsor Quinn (Jeff Fahey) whom he idolizes and credits for saving his life. Shortly after the party William's son Ben suspects that his father is using after finding a syringe in the bathroom.
| 5 | 5 | "Here Comes the Boom" | August 19, 2008 |
A teenage boy (Shiloh Fernandez) asks for William's help with his father (Eric Roberts), who went to prison as a result of William's past efforts. The man, now out, is using methamphetamine again. William and his team go undercover in a biker gang and discover that their mark is part of a heavy-duty meth ring. Unbeknownst to the team, Swenton is forced to relapse on meth to not only maintain his cover but to keep his life. Meanwhile after getting arrested for vandalism (Ben threw a football through several windows), Ben runs away, leaving his family worried. William pockets a small methamphetamine crystal and considers relapsing.
| 6 | 6 | "To Catch a Fed" | August 26, 2008 |
FBI agent Lauren Keenan (Sarah Clarke) strong-arms William into searching for her former partner, agent Michael Davis (Christian Camargo) who developed a drug addiction while deep undercover on a case. William and crew infiltrate a "tent city" of meth manufacturers to find the man, who is delusional and dangerous. Only then does William realize that the FBI agent lied to him: the man is not only her ex-partner, but the father of her unborn child--and a pawn in a larger power struggle within the FBI. Meanwhile, Ben is found to have run off to the home of his paternal grandfather (Raymond J. Barry), and Melissa goes over there to try to talk Ben into coming home. Swenton struggles with his recent relapse.
| 7 | 7 | "House of Pain" | September 2, 2008 |
The principal (Anne Ramsay) of a prestigious prep school, who is also an old friend of William's, asks for his help with a troubled student named Brian Porter (John Patrick Amedori) who is a talented basketball player that has a severe addiction to heroin. Porter also uses hydromorphone so he can get by between fixes. William and his team encounter resistance from the boy's blue-collar father (Jeff Kober), who refuses to believe that his talented son can do wrong. Swenton starts taking pills to alleviate his nerves and to keep himself from using meth.
| 8 | 8 | "Let It Ride" | September 9, 2008 |
Jimmy Alvarez (James Madio) is a renowned horse jockey; unfortunately, he has a severe addiction. He has used the ADD medication Adderall for years in order to "make weight" and vicodin to "come down". A ludomaniac named Sol (Steve Lawrence), has been observing Alvarez's erratic behavior and enlists William for help. William maneuvers the jockey into treatment, but he breaks out in a violent episode and heads for the track. William realizes that he is fighting the man's addiction to his sport as much to drugs.
| 9 | 9 | "The 11th Hour" | September 16, 2008 |
An unsuccessful intervention drives a heroin-addled woman (Rachel Miner) onto the streets. Her sister (Anastasia Griffith) hires William, but the girls' mother (Kathy Baker) does not trust his methods. She retains the original interventionist Dr. Keith Bowen (Isaiah Washington), who considers William, with his unorthodox approach to addiction, to be little more than a thug. During the course of his investigation William comes across a new popular drug on the streets (a drug his client is using) called blue dust, which is both cheap and gives an intense high, but is more dangerous than any other drug. Forced to question what he does and why he does it, William races to find the addict before she succumbs to her addiction.
| 10 | 10 | "Rebecca" | September 23, 2008 |
Rebecca (Rooney Mara), a gifted teenage pianist, has turned to methamphetamine to cope with the pressures in her life. Her father (Steven Culp), who has been reluctantly supporting her habit out of fear of losing her, requests William's help. William and his team face an unexpected challenge in Rebecca's mother (Kelly Lynch), whose control issues have influenced her daughter's neuroses. As Rebecca spirals out of control – "dating" a 50-year-old man (Patrick Fabian) for drug money and stealing from neighbors – William realizes that, in order to save her, he must first heal her family. Swenton's bizarre behavior makes him fall short on his job, much to William's annoyance. Swenton's thirst for meth reaches its breaking point.
| 11 | 11 | "Back to One" | September 30, 2008 |
Lisa (Michelle Borth) moved to Los Angeles years ago with dreams of becoming an actress, but thus far, all she has managed is a steady career as an extra. When her visiting brother (Jackson Rathbone) discovers the depth of her cocaine problem, he enlists William for help. William learns that Lisa has been supporting her habit via a check washing scheme and moves to grab her, only to have her finally land a role that could be her break. Meanwhile, Swenton flees to his ex-girlfriend (Nicole Vicius) and embarks on a heavy meth binge for a number of days. Akani, the only person on the team that knows of Swenton's relapse (William thinks Swenton is taking care of his grandmother), races to locate him.
| 12 | 12 | "Five Little Words" | October 7, 2008 |
William brings Swenton into the Banks home to detox, determined to save him from the fate that Mickey suffered. Meanwhile, William, Akani and Darnell take on a case from drug dealer Gaza Rashburg (Mark Ivanir), who is owed a favor from William due to his help during the Hoffler case (Episode: "Meet the Joneses"). Gaza demands William to help his college daughter (Tania Raymonde) who uses ecstasy and other drugs. William's team infiltrate her sorority house, where Akani discovers that the girl is severely bulimic, while Darnell harbors a personal vendetta against Rashburg. The title of this episode is a reference to five words that William says addicts frequently say or think: "I wish I was dead."
| 13 | 13 | "Lie With Me" | October 14, 2008 |
Neil and Shelly (Tim DeKay & Kari Matchett) have a beautiful daughter (Adair Tishler), a wonderful home, successful careers and dangerous addictions to alcohol. Neil's father (Ralph Waite) comes to William, concerned for his granddaughter's safety. William and his team make a risky play posing as Child Protective Services to remove the little girl from the house and scare Neil and Shelly straight. Jason Andrews (Malcolm-Jamal Warner), a mentally unstable patient at Transitions, becomes dangerously fixated on Genesis 22. William and Melissa get in argument and make a hard decision regarding their marriage.

=== Season 2 (2009) ===
| No. overall | No. in season | Title | Original release date |
|---|---|---|---|
| 14 | 1 | "Hello America" | June 23, 2009 |
Although William and Melissa are now separated, they remain on friendly terms and are keeping their marital situation a secret from Melissa's parents (Barry Newman & Mariette Hartley) who are in town. Also, William faces his old sponsor (Whoopi Goldberg) when an old friend and fellow program member (Jayne Brook) seeks William's help to get her relapsed husband (Gary Cole) a high-profile national news anchor, clean.
| 15 | 2 | "Last American Casualty" | June 30, 2009 |
William sets out to have a relaxing father-son weekend with Ben, but instead is hired by an alcoholic career military veteran (Joe Don Baker) who wishes to get the father (Michael Beach) of a gay soldier, who was killed in action, back down the road to sobriety.
| 16 | 3 | "The Projectionist" | July 7, 2009 |
William is secretly hired by the mother (Alice Amter) of a pregnant Indian girl (Janina Gavankar) that has a drug addiction. William and the team take some radical actions in the case that lead to further complications.
| 17 | 4 | "Does Everybody Have a Drink?" | July 14, 2009 |
Michael Zellman (Noah Bean), a highly stressed talent manager, angrily confronts William about his unsuccessful treatment of his star client (Mia Kirshner) whose severe drug addiction is causing much public embarrassment. William learns that Zellman's stress is also caused by his alcoholic parents (Shirley Jones & Steve Landesberg), who are big L.A. night club stars.
| 18 | 5 | "Split Ends" | July 21, 2009 |
William is hired by the mother (Diana Scarwid) of a young woman (Jeanette Brox) who has had a traumatic life of drug and sexual abuse. The girl's twin sister (Rachel Boston) is no help, as she carries a severe grudge and has a secret addiction to analgesics. William's old friend Greg (Brian Van Holt) shows up unexpectedly, and to William's dismay, his sexual addiction is still intact.
| 19 | 6 | "The Things We Didn't Plan" | July 28, 2009 |
The team takes on three separate cases. Swenton takes on a widower alcoholic father (Paul Schulze) that he meets on a bus. Due to the father's constant state of inebriation his young daughter (Madeline Carroll) plays the role of adult in their household. Meanwhile, William is hired by a cop (Tom Bower) whose cop son (Jamie McShane) needs to be cleaned for a drug test, but to William's dismay, the cop appears to have no intention of making a life-long obligation. Akani takes on an alcoholic homeless woman named Sunshine (Lori Petty).
| 20 | 7 | "An Ordinary Man" | August 4, 2009 |
William and Akani are hired to get a surgeon (Charles Esten) and his RN girlfriend (Rebecca Gayheart) cleaned. The two are not only risking their own lives, but that of their patients, particularly a young girl that needs a heart transplant. The surgeon's narcissistic personality disorder makes this case incredibly difficult for William.
| 21 | 8 | "The Turtle and the Butterfly" | August 11, 2009 |
William and Swenton are hired to retrieve and clean a young man named Travis (Taylor Handley) that is jailed somewhere in the Inland Empire. William and Swenton soon learn that Travis is not only an addict, but is also a valued meth baker. When learning that his facility is about to be raided by the police he sets the place on fire, clearing both him and his superior (Jon Sklaroff) of any crime. However, things get even more complicating when Travis's superior demands him to pay half a million dollars for all damages. William is also forced to take a hard look at Travis's girlfriend (Samantha Shelton) who is both an addict and a prostitute that has a young son Miles (Sterling Beaumon) that is an addict and a pusher.
| 22 | 9 | "The Path of Least Resistance" | August 18, 2009 |
The team is hired by an author (Julia Campbell) whose addicted son Taylor (Reiley McClendon) is missing. Things get complicated when the team learns that Taylor's drug use and other problems are triggered by his struggles with gender identity.
| 23 | 10 | "Cinderella" | August 25, 2009 |
While watching his daughter Lula rehearse for an important ballet recital, William observes that the star ballerina (Ksenia Solo), whom Lula idolizes, uses drugs. William wrestles with his own issues of being an overprotective father and must find a way to help the ballerina with her tribulations while not damaging his relationship with his daughter.
| 24 | 11 | "Standing Eight" | September 1, 2009 |
Bobby Carmichael (Henry Simmons) is a championship boxer with issues of alcoholism and inimicality. An attorney (Greg Germann) seeks William's help in getting Bobby cleaned in time for a big match. Like any case, William takes a no-nonsense approach and purges all alcohol, drugs and enablers away, despite the heavyweight's objections. William also discovers that Bobby's emotionally abused wife Angie (Paola Turbay) is also an addict. Things get violent when Bobby suspects that William is infatuated with his wife.
| 25 | 12 | "Crossing the Threshold" | September 8, 2009 |
A former client of William's (Will Estes) who is an undercover narc in the FBI calls on William to save his drug-addicted girlfriend (Danay Garcia), who also happens to be the daughter of a powerful Mexican drug dealer (Julio Oscar Mechoso). William's world is turned upside down when the drug dealers threaten William's family and put everyone on his team in danger because they are looking for millions of dollars in drugs which were stolen by the narc.
| 26 | 13 | "Trick Candles" | September 15, 2009 |
This episode takes place during the course of one day. The day marks William's ten-year anniversary of being sober. Uninterested in giving the day any special recognition, William spends it doing business as usual as he helps an old friend (Richard Lewis) who chooses heroin and speed over his wife (Annabelle Gurwitch) and kids, get clean. Despite William's apathy, PK, Swenton and Akani attempt to wrangle some of the other addicts William has helped recently for a surprise party in honor of William's sober birthday. William gives a deep apology to Mellissa for the wrongs he committed during his addiction.

== Home media ==
The first season of The Cleaner was released on DVD on June 9, 2009, and the second and final season was released on DVD on June 1, 2010.

== Ratings ==
2008 first-run ratings for The Cleaner were 1.1 million in the 18-49 demographic. The series finale averaged 1.528 million viewers in live+7.

== International airings ==
- The series was broadcast in Latin America through the A&E Latinamerica channel. Series one premiered on Sunday, October 5, 2008. The second season premiered on Tuesday, September 8, 2009.
- The first season premiered in Bulgaria in 2009 on AXN and the Second premiered in January 2010. In 2010 also the first season started on PRO.BG with different dub.
- The first season of the series premiered in Italy on Thursday September 10, 2009, on pay-TV channel Joi (Mediaset Premium).
- The first season premiered in Ireland in January 2010, on RTÉ Two.
- The first season premiered in Kenya in January 2011, on nation tv.
- The first season premiered in Greece in April 2011, on Skai TV.
- The first and second season have been broadcast in Finland on nelonen.
