= The Color Purple (musical) =

2005 musical

- Original Broadway promotional poster
- Music: Brenda Russell; Allee Willis; Stephen Bray
- Lyrics: Brenda Russell; Allee Willis; Stephen Bray
- Book: Marsha Norman
- Basis: The Color Purple by Alice Walker; The Color Purple by Menno Meyjes
- Productions: 2005 Broadway; 2007 Chicago; 2007 First U.S. tour 2010 Second U.S. tour 2012 Third U.S. tour 2013 Off West End; 2015 Broadway revival 2017 Fourth U.S. tour
- Awards: 2016 Tony Award for Best Revival of a Musical; 2016 Drama League Award for Outstanding Revival of a Musical; 2017 Grammy Award for Best Musical Theater Album

The Color Purple is a musical with music and lyrics by Brenda Russell, Allee Willis, and Stephen Bray, and book by Marsha Norman. Based on the 1982 novel The Color Purple by Alice Walker and its 1985 film adaptation, the musical follows the journey of Celie, an African American woman in the American South from the early to mid-20th century.

The original Broadway production ran from 2005 to 2008, earning eleven Tony Award nominations in 2006. An enthusiastically acclaimed Broadway revival opened in late 2015 and ran through early 2017, winning two 2016 Tony Awards—including Best Revival of a Musical.

A film adaptation of the musical was released on December 25, 2023.

== Productions ==
=== Workshop and world premiere (2004–2005) ===
The Color Purple was originally workshopped by the Alliance Theatre in Atlanta, Georgia, in mid-2004 following Scott Sanders' optioning the work from Alice Walker in 1999 and auditioning various creative team members. The September 9, 2004, world premiere of the musical was produced by the Alliance Theatre in Atlanta by special arrangement with Creative Battery and Scott Sanders Productions.

For the Atlanta run, LaChanze starred as Celie, Felicia P. Fields as Sofia, Saycon Sengbloh as Nettie, Adriane Lenox as Shug and Kingsley Leggs as Mister. Gary Griffin staged the work, with scenic design by John Lee Beatty, lighting by Brian MacDevitt, costumes by Paul Tazewell and sound by Jon Weston.

=== Broadway (2005–2008) ===
The musical opened on Broadway at the Broadway Theatre on December 1, 2005. It was directed by Gary Griffin, produced by Scott Sanders, Quincy Jones and Oprah Winfrey, with choreography by Donald Byrd and musical direction by Linda Twine. The musical closed on February 24, 2008, after 30 previews and 910 regular performances. The production recouped its $11 million investment within its first year on Broadway, and had grossed over $103 million by the time it closed.

The original Broadway production starred LaChanze as Celie, Brandon Victor Dixon as Harpo, Felicia P. Fields as Sofia, Renée Elise Goldsberry as Nettie, Kingsley Leggs as Mister, Krisha Marcano as Squeak, and Elisabeth Withers-Mendes as Shug Avery.

=== First national tour (2007–2010) ===
==== Chicago (2007) ====
The first national tour began on April 17, 2007, starting with an extended run at the Cadillac Palace Theatre in Chicago, Illinois. The company includes LaToya London as Nettie, Michelle Williams as Shug Avery, Felicia P. Fields as Sofia, and Jeannette Bayardelle as Celie, Stephanie St. James as Squeak. Bayardelle and Fields both are reprising their roles from Broadway. The show exceeded expectations, which necessitated a four-week extension of its Chicago engagement until September 30, 2007. The original expectation was that the show would run in Chicago until November. In all, the show produced respectable business results bringing in about $1 million per week for the first half of the engagement, but less during the summer months when the ticket prices were reduced to $39.50 to keep the theater full.

Chicago was notable as a starting point of the national tour because Oprah Winfrey, a 1986 Academy Awards nominee in the film adaptation is a Chicago resident. In addition, Felicia Fields is a Chicago native and resident. It was also a homecoming for Gary Griffin. Both Fields and Griffin made their broadway theatre debuts with this musical. As a result of the Chicago connections the Chicago premiere had a star-studded red carpet with Chicago Mayor Richard M. Daley, Jesse Jackson, R. Kelly, and Roger Ebert. Others in attendance included United States Senator Carol Moseley Braun and Christie Hefner. Coverage of the Chicago premiere was prominent in international media.

==== Tour (2009–2010) ====
The 2009–2010 tour length started at the Kennedy Center Opera House in Washington, D.C. on August 9, 2009, and ended at the Pantages Theatre in Los Angeles, California. The direction was by Griffin with John Lee Beatty as set designer, Paul Tazewell as costumer and Jon Weston as sound director. The official cast roles were made by Fantasia Barrino as Celie, Angela Robinson as Shug Avery, Felicia P. Fields as Sofia and LaToya London as Nettie.

=== Second national tour (2010–2011) ===
A second national tour with a new non-Equity cast opened on March 12, 2010, at the Lyric Opera House and visited numerous US cities, making several return engagements. Tour stops include Omaha, Nashville, Fort Lauderdale, Mobile, Durham, and more. In August 2010, Oprah Winfrey announced the traveling company of The Color Purple would be raising funds for the relief organization SBP along with the novel's author, Alice Walker. Due to an overwhelming demand, the tour returned to New Orleans where it played a 5-show limited-engagement at the Mahalia Jackson Theater for the Performing Arts from February 11–13, 2011.

=== Third national tour (2012) ===
A third national tour with a non-Equity cast opened January 17, 2012, at the Francis Marion University PAC, in Florence, South Carolina, with previews in New Haven, CT at the Schubert Theater. The role of Celie was played by Washington, D.C., native Ashley L. Ware, and Taprena Augustine reprised her role as Shug Avery alongside Dayna Marie Quincy taking the role of Nettie (later taking the role of Celie at Toby's Dinner Theatre in Columbia). Tour stops included Nevada (Las Vegas & Reno), Alabama (Mobile), Pennsylvania (Williamsport, Reading & Bloomsburg), and more.

=== London production (2013) ===
A first international production, directed by John Doyle, opened in London at the Menier Chocolate Factory on July 17, 2013. The limited run ended on September 14, 2013. The cast included Cynthia Erivo (Celie), Nicola Hughes (Shug) and Christopher Colquhoun (Mister/Albert).

=== Broadway revival (2015–2017) ===
On January 9, 2015, producers Scott Sanders, Roy Furman, and Oprah Winfrey announced that the Menier Chocolate Factory production would be mounted on Broadway. Jennifer Hudson would make her Broadway debut in the role of Shug, Danielle Brooks would play the role of Sofia, and Cynthia Erivo would reprise her role as Celie. Kyle Jean-Baptiste was slated to be in it as well, but he died in a fall on August 29, 2015. Previews began November 10, 2015, with the official opening being December 10 at the Bernard B. Jacobs Theatre. Erivo won the 2016 Tony Award for Best Actress in a Musical, with the production taking home the 2016 Tony Award for Best Revival of a Musical. The production closed on January 8, 2017, after 33 previews and 449 performances.

=== South Africa (2018) ===
The first major international staging of the musical since the Broadway revival opened in Johannesburg, South Africa, on February 4, 2018.

=== Netherlands (2018) ===
The first translated production of The Color Purple opened on April 16 in Amsterdam at the NDSM wharf visited by the Queen of the Netherlands. This production was produced by Opus One and translated and directed by Koen van Dijk. The limited engagement will be followed by a tour in the autumn through several theatres in the Netherlands. It opened to positive reviews and starred newcomer Naomi van der Linden as Celie, Ana Milva Gomes as Shug Avery, Jeannine de la Rose as Sofia, Edwin Jonker as Mister and Carlos de Vries as Harpo.

=== Leicester and Birmingham (2019) ===
A new co-production between Curve, Leicester and Birmingham Hippodrome opened in Leicester on June 28, 2019, before transferring to Birmingham on July 16, 2019. The production was directed by Tinuke Craig with T'Shan Williams as Celie, Karen Mavundukure as Sofia, Joanna Francis as Shug and Ako Mitchell as Mister.

=== Canada (2019) ===
The Canadian premiere of The Color Purple opened in Halifax, Nova Scotia Neptune Theatre (Halifax) on April 9, 2019. The production is directed by Kimberley Rampersad, the first African-Canadian and woman to helm the show.

=== Brazil (2019) ===
The Brazilian production of the musical opened in Rio de Janeiro from September 6 to November 3, 2019, before transferring to São Paulo from December 6, 2019, to February 16, 2020. The production was directed by Tadeu Aguiar.

== Synopsis ==
=== Act I ===
On a Sunday morning in 1909, fourteen-year-old Celie – who has had one child by her father Alphonso and is now pregnant with her second – plays a clapping game with her younger sister Nettie ("Huckleberry Pie"). While attending services with the other members of their rural Georgia community, Celie goes into labor and is dragged out of the church as the congregation quietly looks on ("Mysterious Ways"). After Celie gives birth to a son, her father takes the child away and bluntly tells her he is going to get rid of it like the last one. Celie quietly says goodbye to her newborn and asks God for a sign ("Somebody Gonna Love You").

Four years later, local farmer and widower Albert "Mister" Johnson approaches Alphonso and asks permission to marry one of his daughters. Alphonso agrees, offering him Celie, instead of Nettie, and throwing a cow into the bargain. Although the girls promise never to be separated, Celie goes with Mister to save Nettie's dreams of becoming a teacher ("Our Prayer"). The local Church Ladies cluck their approval ("That Fine Mister") while Mister's field hands introduce Celie to a life of hard work ("Big Dog").

One day, Nettie arrives, explaining that she is tired of Alphonso's lecherous attentions and asking if she can stay. Mister agrees, but later attacks Nettie while she is walking to school. She fights back, prompting Mister to kick her out ("Mister / Nettie"). Celie protests, but Mister swears they will never see each other again. As she leaves Mister's property, Nettie promises to write to Celie. But when she goes to the mailbox the next day, Mister slams the mailbox shut, threatening to kill her if he ever sees her touch it ("Lily of the Field").

In 1920, Mister's son Harpo brings home Sofia, a strong-willed woman whom he later marries ("Dear God - Sofia"). When he complains that he is tired of Sofia bossing him around, Mister and Celie tell him the only way to get her to listen is to beat her. Harpo attempts to do so but ends up being beaten by Sofia ("A Tree Named Sofia"). After confronting Celie, Sofia learns the extent of Mister's cruelty and tells Celie to stand up for herself before leaving home to spend time with her sisters ("Hell No!").

Harpo decides to turn his house into a juke joint and engages in an affair with a waitress named Squeak, who moves in with him ("Brown Betty"). Sometime later, the community prepares for the arrival of jazz singer Shug Avery, who is revealed to be Mister's longtime lover ("Shug Avery Comin' to Town"). But when Shug arrives with her band, she is in such bad shape that Celie nurses her back to health despite local disapproval ("All We've Got to Say").

While tailoring a dress for Shug's debut, Celie experiences feelings of warmth and tenderness for the first time ("Dear God - Shug"). Shug, meanwhile, learns more about Celie's relationship with Mister and encourages her to find her inner strength ("Too Beautiful for Words"').

That night, at Harpo's Juke Joint, Shug brings down the house with a raucous blues number ("Push Da Button"). Sofia arrives with her new boyfriend Buster and dances with Harpo, prompting Squeak to pick a fight with her ("Uh-Oh!"). The fight eventually escalates into a bar brawl, prompting Shug and Celie to escape.

After returning to Mister's house, Shug and Celie explore their newfound relationship ("What About Love?"). Shug uncovers several letters for Celie that have come from Africa. Celie recognizes Nettie's handwriting and realizes her sister is alive ("Act I Finale").

=== Act II ===
While reading the letters that Mister has hidden from her, Celie learns Nettie is in Africa and is living with the missionary family that adopted her children ("African Homeland"). In Georgia, Sofia is arrested for assaulting the mayor after refusing to work for his wife. When Celie goes to visit her, she learns Sofia will serve out her sentence in the Mayor's custody.

In 1932, Shug brings her lover Grady over for Easter. After learning the extent of Celie's anger towards God, Shug invites her to come back to Memphis with her so they can enjoy the simple joys of life ("The Color Purple"). After sitting down to dinner ("Church Ladies' Easter"), Celie tells Mister that she is leaving and Squeak announces she is leaving as well. When Mister refuses and tries to beat her, Celie stands firm and curses him ("I Curse You, Mister"). Harpo then invites Sofia to come back and live at the Juke Joint, reconciling with her in the process. Eventually, Mister begins to feel the effect of Celie's curse. Harpo challenges his father to make things right after a bunch of terrible things happen to Mister, which force Mister to try to understand the meaning of Celie's curse and the meaning of life other than his tough childhood ("Mister's Song/Celie's Curse").

At Shug's Memphis home, Celie starts writing back to Nettie and discovers that she has a natural gift for making pants. After inheriting her childhood home, Celie starts a business and begins selling her designs ("Miss Celie's Pants"). Meanwhile, Harpo and Sofia hit it off and learn Mister is having difficulty getting Nettie and the children to come to the United States. The three resolve to make a plan. ("Any Little Thing")

Shug tells Celie she has fallen in love with a 19-year-old musician in her band and asks her permission to have one last fling with him. Meanwhile, Mister has reconciled his life ("What About Love? [Reprise]"). While walking home, Celie realizes she is not destroyed by this and, for the first time, feels a deep love for herself ("I'm Here").

Several years later, while hosting a Fourth of July picnic for the community, Celie hears a car horn and a familiar voice from her childhood. It is Nettie singing the clapping song they sang years ago. They both run to each other and hug with Celie's children right behind them all grown up. After learning that Mister and Shug have made the reunion possible, Celie thanks them and God for reuniting her with her sister ("The Color Purple [Reprise]").

== Cast ==
=== Original casts of notable productions ===
Character	Broadway	First U.S. National Tour	Second U.S. National Tour	Off-West End	Broadway Revival	Third U.S. National Tour	Film Adaptation
Character	2005	2007	2010	2013	2015	2017	2023
Celie	LaChanze	Jeannette Bayardelle	Fantasia Barrino	Cynthia Erivo	Cynthia Erivo	Adrianna Hicks	Fantasia Barrino
Shug Avery	Elisabeth Withers	Michelle Williams	Angela Robinson	Nicola Hughes	Jennifer Hudson	Carla R. Stewart	Taraji P. Henson
Sofia	Felicia P. Fields	Felicia P. Fields	Felicia P. Fields	Sophia Nomvete	Danielle Brooks	Carrie Compere	Danielle Brooks
Mister/Albert	Kingsley Leggs	Rufus Bonds Jr.	Rufus Bonds Jr.	Christopher Colquhoun	Isaiah Johnson	Gavin Gregory	Colman Domingo
Harpo	Brandon Victor Dixon	Stu James	Stu James	Adebayo Bolaji	Kyle Scatliffe	J. Daughtry	Corey Hawkins
Nettie	Renée Elise Goldsberry	LaToya London	LaToya London	Abiona Omonua	Joaquina Kalukango	N'Jameh Camara	Ciara

=== Cast replacements ===
- Fantasia assumed the role of Celie in the original Broadway production from April 10, 2007 – January 6, 2008, becoming the first American Idol winner on Broadway. Fantasia reprised her performance as Celie in the 2010 National tour from June 30-September 13, 2010, & also the 2023 film.
- Montego Glover assumed the role of Nettie in the original Broadway production on January 8, 2008.
- Heather Headley assumed the role of Shug Avery from Jennifer Hudson in the 2015 Broadway revival on May 10, 2016.
- Jennifer Holliday assumed the role of Shug Avery from Heather Headley in the 2015 revival on October 4, 2016.
- Nathaniel Stampley assumed the role of Mister from Isaiah Johnson in the 2015 revival on November 15, 2016.

== Musical numbers ==
Act I

- "Overture"† – Orchestra
- "Huckleberry Pie" / "Mysterious Ways" – Young Celie and Young Nettie / Celie, Nettie and Ensemble
- "Somebody Gonna Love You" – Celie
- "Our Prayer" – Nettie, Celie, Mister, Doris, Darlene, Jarene and Pa
- "That Fine Mister" – Doris, Darlene and Jarene
- "Big Dog" – Mister, Celie, Young Harpo, Mister's Daughters and Male Ensemble
- "Lily of the Field" – Celie, Nettie and Mister
- "Dear God - Sofia" – Celie
- "A Tree Named Sofia" – Doris, Darlene and Jarene
- “Hell No!” - Sofia, Celie, & Sofia's Sisters
- "Brown Betty" – Harpo, Squeak, Celie and Male Ensemble
- "Shug Avery Comin' to Town" – Mister, Celie and Ensemble
- "All We've Got to Say" – Doris, Darlene and Jarene
- "Dear God - Shug" – Celie and Shug
- "Too Beautiful for Words" – Shug
- "Push Da Button" – Shug, Harpo and Ensemble
- "Uh-Oh!" – Sofia, Squeak, Celie, Buster and Female Ensemble
- "What About Love?" – Celie and Shug
- "Act I Finale"† – Orchestra, Shug, Celie and Nettie

Act II

- "African Homeland" – Nettie, Celie, Young Adam, Young Olivia and Ensemble
- "The Color Purple" – Shug and Celie
- "Church Ladies' Easter"† – Doris, Darlene and Jarene
- "I Curse You Mister"† – Celie and Mister
- "Mister's Song - Celie's Curse" – Mister
- "Miss Celie's Pants" – Celie, Shug, Sofia and Female Ensemble
- "Any Little Thing" – Harpo and Sofia
- "What About Love? (Reprise)" – Celie and Shug
- "I'm Here" – Celie
- "The Color Purple (Reprise)" – Celie and Company

†Not included on the 2015 Revival Cast Recording

== Critical reception ==
=== 2005 production ===
The 2005 production received mixed to negative reviews from critics, who praised the performances but criticized its heavy adaptation, sluggish running time and the absence of romance between the female characters. Theatre critic Ben Brantley of The New York Times wrote, "Celie had morphed into a heroine of the kind of inspirational women's fiction found in airport bookstores, written by Barbara Taylor Bradford and Danielle Steel. These are authors I would never have thought to compare to Alice Walker." Brantley also criticized its length writing, "Watching this beat-the-clock production summons the frustrations of riding through a picturesque stretch of country in a supertrain like the TGV." Brantley did however praise the casting adding "this show is blessed with a surfeit of performing talent... It is to the credit of each of these confident actresses that their characters register as emphatically and winningly as they do in the midst of the narrative rush".

David Rooney of Variety wrote, "Neither Steven Spielberg’s prettified, Amblin-ized 1985 movie nor this big, messy patchwork of a musical entirely do justice to the story of poor black women from the Deep South in the first half of the 20th century." Rooney added "the show crudely reduces the sprawling feminist saga to cartoonish episodes". He also criticized the music in the show writing, "Like everything else in the show, the musical elements are a far-from-seamless mix, alternating flat stretches with stirring peaks, and too many songs feel incomplete." Jeremy McCarter of New York Magazine also panned the musical, criticizing it for its unfaithful adaptation of the novel and failing to add the lesbian romance into the musical. McCarter wrote, "Amid all this faith-based dramaturgy, it’s no surprise that the lesbian element in Celie’s story gets swept aside. The love she shares with Shug in Walker’s book is dispatched here with a couple of timid kisses and some platitudinous lyrics. Hollywood has gay cowboys, and a Broadway musical gets nervous about an awkward hug? Who’s responsible for this madness?"

=== 2015 production ===
The 2015 revival received positive reviews with critics praising its cast: in particular Cynthia Erivo, who many credit for the success of the production. Ben Brantley of The New York Times reviewed the revival referencing the 2005 production describing it as "a big, gaudy, lumbering creature that felt oversold and overdressed". He however stated that "the current version is a slim, fleet-footed beauty, simply attired and beguilingly modest. Don’t be deceived, though, by its air of humility. There’s a deep wealth of power within its restraint." Brantley praised Erivo as "incandescent" adding "Ms. Erivo escorts us through these transformations with a subtle but tensile performance that parallels her character’s evolution". Marilyn Stasio of Variety also praised the production describing Erivo as "haunting", Jennifer Hudson as "radiant" and wrote that Danielle Brooks "shakes the house".

In Alexis Soloski's The Guardian three star review praised Erivo's performance describing her as "a remarkable actor and singer who can accomplish a tremendous amount while seeming to do very little. She communicates Celie’s suffering with scant exaggeration or fuss and her joy is infectious". Soloski also added, "[Jennifer] Hudson may have a marquee name, but make no mistake this is Erivo’s show. She’s here and if New York producers have any sense, she’ll stay." Soloski however criticized the production calling "this version...streamlined and stripped down" but added "the fine performances, particularly Erivo as the downtrodden Celie, brighten it up."

Jesse Oxfeld of Entertainment Weekly praised the production and its performances. She cited Erivo's number "I'm Here" as a standout adding, "Erivo’s ovation is well-earned. This is a star-making moment". She wrote of Danielle Brooks' Broadway debut "She turns out to be a gifted stage actress. She’s funny, sensitive, and compulsively charismatic." David Rooney of Billboard gave a positive review, writing of Jennifer Hudson's performance "Hudson might not yet quite match the assurance in dramatic scenes of the cast’s more seasoned stage performers, but with that voice, nobody’s going to care. Her vocals are sensational — luscious and full-bodied, with astonishing control."

== Awards and nominations ==
=== Original Broadway production ===
Year	Award Ceremony	Category	Nominee	Result	Ref
2006	Tony Award	Best Musical		Nominated	
2006	Tony Award	Best Book of a Musical	Marsha Norman	Nominated	
2006	Tony Award	Best Original Score	Brenda Russell, Allee Willis and Stephen Bray	Nominated	
2006	Tony Award	Best Actress in a Musical	LaChanze	Won	
2006	Tony Award	Best Featured Actor in a Musical	Brandon Victor Dixon	Nominated	
2006	Tony Award	Best Featured Actress in a Musical	Felicia P. Fields	Nominated	
2006	Tony Award	Best Featured Actress in a Musical	Elizabeth Withers-Mendez	Nominated	
2006	Tony Award	Best Choreography	Donald Byrd	Nominated	
2006	Tony Award	Best Scenic Design	John Lee Beatty	Nominated	
2006	Tony Award	Best Costume Design	Paul Tazewell	Nominated	
2006	Tony Award	Best Lighting Design	Brian MacDevitt	Nominated	
2006	Theatre World Award		Felicia P. Fields	Won	
2006	Theatre World Award		Elisabeth Withers-Mendes	Won	
2007	Grammy Award	Best Musical Show Album		Nominated	
2007	Theatre World Award		Fantasia Barrino	Honoree	

=== 2015 Broadway revival ===
Year	Award Ceremony	Category	Nominee	Result	Ref
2016	Tony Award	Best Revival of a Musical		Won	
2016	Tony Award	Best Actress in a Musical	Cynthia Erivo	Won	
2016	Tony Award	Best Featured Actress in a Musical	Danielle Brooks	Nominated	
2016	Tony Award	Best Direction of a Musical	John Doyle	Nominated	
2016	Drama Desk Award	Outstanding Revival of a Musical		Nominated	
2016	Drama Desk Award	Outstanding Actress in a Musical	Cynthia Erivo	Won	
2016	Drama Desk Award	Outstanding Featured Actress in a Musical	Danielle Brooks	Nominated	
2016	Drama Desk Award	Outstanding Director of a Musical	John Doyle	Won	
2016	Drama Desk Award	Outstanding Orchestrations	Catherine Jayes and Joseph Joubert	Nominated	
2016	Drama Desk Award	Outstanding Lighting Design for a Musical	Jane Cox	Nominated	
2016	Drama League Award	Outstanding Revival of a Musical		Won	
2016	Drama League Award	Distinguished Performance	Cynthia Erivo	Nominated	
2016	Drama League Award	Distinguished Performance	Jennifer Hudson	Nominated	
2016	Outer Critics Circle Award	Outstanding Revival of a Musical		Nominated	
2016	Outer Critics Circle Award	Outstanding Actress in a Musical	Cynthia Erivo	Won	
2016	Outer Critics Circle Award	Outstanding Featured Actress in a Musical	Danielle Brooks	Nominated	
2016	Theatre World Award		Cynthia Erivo	Honoree	
2016	Theatre World Award		Danielle Brooks	Honoree	
2017	Grammy Award	Best Musical Theater Album		Won	
2017	Daytime Emmy Award	Outstanding Musical Performance in a Daytime Program	Cynthia Erivo and the Cast of The Color Purple on Today	Won	

== Film adaptation ==
On November 2, 2018, it was announced that a film adaptation of the musical was in development at Warner Bros. Pictures and Amblin Entertainment, the same companies that made the 1985 film adaptation of the novel, with Steven Spielberg, Quincy Jones, Scott Sanders, and Oprah Winfrey all signing on to produce. On August 24, 2020, it was announced that Marcus Gardley will write the screenplay and Black is King's Blitz Bazawule will direct. Winfrey praised the selection of Bazawule as director, after she and the producers saw his work on The Burial of Kojo, saying that "We, were all blown away by Blitz's unique vision as a director and look forward to seeing how he brings the next evolution of this beloved story to life." It was also announced that Alice Walker, Rebecca Walker, Kristie Macosko Krieger, Carla Gardini, and Mara Jacobs will executive produce the film. It was announced on December 23, 2020, that the film will be released on December 20, 2023. Corey Hawkins plays the role of Harpo in the film and singer-songwriter H.E.R. will make her acting debut as Squeak. On February 1, 2022, Taraji P. Henson was announced to star in the role of Shug Avery. On February 3, 2022, the rest of the cast was announced, with Fantasia starring as Celie, Danielle Brooks reprising her role as Sofia, Colman Domingo as Mister, and Halle Bailey as Nettie. On March 22, 2022, it was announced that Ciara had joined the cast as older Nettie. The film was released on December 25, 2023.
