= Adebayo Bolaji =

British painter, actor, writer and director

Adébayo Bolaji
- Adebayo Tibabalase Bolaji
- Born: 15 May 1983 (age 43); Perivale, England
- Education: Royal Central School of Speech and Drama
- Occupation: Artist
- Notable work: Ghost The Musical, Skyfall, The Color Purple, The Scottsboro Boys

Adebayo Bolaji (born 15 May 1983) is a London-based painter, actor, writer and director.

== Early life ==
Adebayo Tibabalase Bolaji was born in Perivale in the London Borough of Ealing, of Nigerian parents, and is an English actor, writer and director. Bolaji began his acting career when he was 14 with the National Youth Music Theatre, making his West End debut in their 1997 production of Bugsy Malone at the Queen's Theatre. With NYMT he performed at the Edinburgh Festival three times, in Tokyo, at the Palace Theatre, London and the Lyceum Theatre, London.

== Education ==
Bolaji graduated from London Guildhall University with a degree in Law but went on to train at the Central School of Speech and Drama.

== Actor, director and writer ==
Bolaji originated the role of the Subway Ghost in Ghost the Musical, directed by Matthew Warchus and produced by Colin Ingram. Bolaji appeared in Skyfall directed by the Oscar-winning Sam Mendes, as one of the henchmen of Silva, played by Javier Bardem and was also cast in Tom Hooper's movie version of Les Misérables but had to withdraw due to film schedule conflicts.

In May 2013, Bolaji was cast in the Menier Chocolate Factory's production of The Color Purple and the Young Vic's production of Susan Stroman's London premiere of The Scottsboro Boys.

Bolaji's first play Ugly Butterflies was performed at the Central School of Speech and Drama while still in training. Bolaji's second play, In Bed, was written and produced at The Questors Theatre with Ex Nihilo, the theatre company he set up in 2009.

In December 2018, Bolaji's theatre company Ex Nihilo will be showing Jacky Ivimy's play Dialektikon at the Park Theatre which Bolaji will direct. The play is based on the counter-culture event in 1967, the Dialectics of Liberation Congress.

== Career as Painter ==
Bolaji is a self-taught artist and came to work with the medium of paint later on in his acting career. In an interview with Vanessa Murrell via DATEAGLE ART, he stated "acting and law offer great tools, such as asking the right questions".

In 2016 Bolaji was chosen as Tangle's commissioned artist for Yinka Shonibare's MBE Guest Projects Space, in Hackney London, for emerging artists, subsequently Bolaji was selected to show his works at long standing contemporary gallery Galerie Proarta, in Zürich Switzerland.

== Personal life ==
Bolaji currently lives in London and is also a percussionist.

== Filmography ==
Film
Year	Title	Role	Notes
2012	Skyfall	Boat Crew	
2012	Les Misérables	Sailor	Uncredited
2016	The White King	Carol	
