= Kyle Jean-Baptiste =

American actor (1993–2015)

- Jean-Baptiste in costume as Courfeyrac from Les Misérables in June 2015
- Born: December 3, 1993; Brooklyn, New York, U.S.
- Died: August 29, 2015 (aged 21); Brooklyn, New York, U.S.
- Education: Baldwin Wallace University
- Occupation: Actor
- Years active: 2015
- Known for: First Black actor to play Jean Valjean in Les Misérables on Broadway
- Website: http://kylejeanbaptiste.com/

Kyle Jean-Baptiste (December 3, 1993 – August 29, 2015) was an American actor. He was the youngest, as well as the first Black actor, to play the role of Jean Valjean in Les Misérables on Broadway.

He was also slated to be a cast member of the revival of the musical The Color Purple. On August 29, 2015, a day after departing Les Misérables and two days after his final performance as Valjean, he died, after accidentally falling from a fire escape in Brooklyn, New York. Scholarships in his name exist at Fiorello H. LaGuardia High School and at Baldwin Wallace University.

== Early life ==
Jean-Baptiste was born to Haitian-born Serge Jean-Baptiste (born 1964) and Guyanese-born Sonia Jean-Baptiste (born 1966). Jean-Baptiste lived in Canarsie, Brooklyn, with his parents and two sisters, Kelsey and Keely, with whom he was close. He attended P.S. 276 in Brooklyn, where he gained a love for the stage. He also attended Fiorello H. LaGuardia High School, where he was accepted on a Vocal audition during the end of Junior High School (PS/IS 66).

In 2011, Jean-Baptiste attended Baldwin Wallace University in Berea, Ohio, where he studied under the tutelage of Victoria Bussert, Scott Plate, Timothy Mussard, Joanne Uniatowski, Adam Heffernan, Gregory Daniels, Sara Whale, Heidi Glynias, and others.

During his senior showcase, he sang a selection from the musical Once, followed by "Glory" from the film Selma. He was a tenor. Upon his return to New York City, he was ultimately signed by Ben Sands at Stone Manners Salners Agency. During the showcase, he was spotted by Les Miserables casting directors. The day after graduation, they asked him to join the cast.

== Career ==
Educational Productions that Kyle had roles in included: Carousel (Billy Bigelow), Les Misérables (Javert) at The New London Barn Playhouse, Love Story The Musical, Murder Ballad The Musical.

Regional shows Jean-Baptiste performed in included Singin' in the Rain, The Music Man, and The Merry Wives of Windsor. In 2014, he played the role of Enjolras in a production of Les Misérables at the Idaho Shakespeare Festival.

In the Broadway revival of Les Misérables, Jean-Baptiste joined the cast on June 23, 2015, playing the roles of Courfeyrac and the Constable, as well as understudying the role of Jean Valjean. He made his first appearance as Jean Valjean on July 23, 2015, going on for Ramin Karimloo while the latter was on vacation. With his appearance, Jean-Baptiste became both the first Black actor and the youngest actor to portray the character on Broadway. His last show was August 27, 2015. Prior to the accident that killed him, Jean-Baptiste had tweeted his fans: "I thank everyone who supported me and still does. I will never forget this experience. Onwards and upwards. Nothing but love."

He was slated to appear with Cynthia Erivo and Jennifer Hudson in the Broadway production of The Color Purple later in 2015.

== Death ==
Jean-Baptiste died on August 29, 2015, at Woodhull Hospital in the Bedford-Stuyvesant section of Brooklyn, New York, after falling four stories, from a fire escape, at the residence that his family were temporarily relocated to after a fire at their primary residence. He went out to view a full moon with a friend, and at around 4am Jean-Baptiste lost his balance on his way back into his room. His death was ruled as accidental. The evening before, he had participated in his closing performance of Les Misérables. He was only 21 years old.

=== Aftermath ===
A memorial, attended by about 200 friends and family was held, at the Bethesda Fountain in Central Park on August 31, 2015. The lights were dimmed at the Les Miserables' Imperial Theatre, Hamilton's Marquee at the Richard Rodgers Theatre, and Cleveland's Playhouse Square on September 1, 2015 at 10:15 PM in his honor.

The Les Misérables production released a statement, saying:

The entire Les Miserables family is shocked and devastated by the sudden and tragic loss of Kyle, a remarkable young talent and tremendous person who made magic – and history – in his Broadway debut. We send our deepest condolences to his family and ask that you respect their privacy in this unimaginably difficult time.

Other entertainers tweeted their condolences, including Kristin Chenoweth, Debra Messing, Josh Groban, Jesse Tyler Ferguson, Ansel Elgort, and Lin-Manuel Miranda. His alma mater, Baldwin Wallace University, posted on Facebook that they were "incredibly saddened by the loss" of one of their own. His Facebook page remains as a Memorial. Three scholarships were begun in his name at Baldwin Wallace University, Fiorello H. LaGuardia High School, and with teachers at the PS 276 Louis Marshall School. The Kyle Jean-Baptiste Foundation, Inc was formed in 2016.

The Baldwin Wallace University community celebrated Jean-Baptiste's life in a student-led ceremony. Classmates raised funds for a music theater scholarship in his name.
