= Warren Boyd =

American addiction counselor

Warren Boyd (born 1958) is owner of Wavelengths Recovery Center, and recovering drug addict. He is a co-executive producer of the American A&E television series The Cleaner, which is based on his life.

By the time he was 32, Boyd had spent five years in prison after having been found guilty in nine DUIs. He was addicted to alcohol and cocaine, and had been in 26 rehab programs. After his girlfriend gave birth to their first child in 1990, he claimed that when he first held his infant daughter that he realized that he must achieve sobriety.

Besides the television show, he is best known for clients including Courtney Love, Mel Gibson, Robert Downey Jr., and Whitney Houston.
