= Grand Rounds =

Grand Rounds may refer to:

- Grand rounds, a methodology of medical education
- Grand Rounds (journal), a case report journal
- Grand Rounds National Scenic Byway, a parkway system in Minneapolis, Minnesota, United States

== See also ==
- Grand Ronde (disambiguation)
