= Chamber Music America =

American non-profit organization

- Formation: September 1977; 49 years ago
- Founder: Benjamin S. Dunham
- Type: Musical organization
- Location: New York City
- Region served: United States
- Members: Small ensemble professionals
- Chief Executive Officer: Kevin Kwan Loucks
- Staff: 16
- Website: chambermusicamerica.org

Chamber Music America (CMA) is an American non-profit organization that provides small ensemble professionals with access to a variety of professional development, networking, and funding resources. CMA's regular initiatives include grants, awards, and commissioning programs for ensembles and presenters, a national conference held annually in New York City, and the publication of Chamber Music magazine.

CMA defines chamber music as "music composed for small ensembles, with one musician per part, generally performed without a conductor. The term once referred only to Western classical music for small ensembles, such as string quartets. But today chamber music encompasses myriad forms, including contemporary and traditional jazz, classical, and world genres." CMA-member organizations and individuals include ensembles, musicians, concert presenters, artist managers, composers, educators, and others involved in the performance of classical, jazz, contemporary, and world music.

== History ==
Chamber Music America was founded in September 1977 by 34 musicians with the principal aims of uniting, serving, and advocating for small ensemble music professionals. The organization's first executive director was Benjamin S. Dunham.

In its early years, CMA focused on expanding opportunities for chamber groups to perform outside traditional concert halls, establishing community-based residencies and partnerships. Writing in The New York Times in 1979, critic Harold C. Schonberg described the organization as "a vigorous new force" helping to “open up new possibilities for chamber music," noting its efforts to connect musicians and audiences beyond established institutions.

Around this time, CMA was selected by the National Endowment for the Arts to administer the NEA's first chamber music grant program. The organization held its first national conference in 1978, and soon after broadened membership to include presenters, artist managers, publicists, and music-related businesses.

In the early 1980s, CMA established its first formal commissioning program. The Classical Commissioning program was officially launched in 1984, after planning stages in 1983, and has since supported hundreds of new works. Among the first pieces commissioned with CMA support were works by Martin Bresnick, Ellen Taaffe Zwilich, and Charles Wuorinen. Aaron Jay Kernis's String Quartet No. 2 — commissioned by the Lark Quartet with CMA support — won the Pulitzer Prize in 1997. The current Classical Commissioning program is supported by the Andrew W. Mellon Foundation.

Since 2000, jazz has been a significant part of Chamber Music America's grants and professional development programs. CMA's two jazz-specific grant programs — New Jazz Works: Commissioning and Ensemble Development and Presenter Consortium for Jazz — are supported by the Doris Duke Charitable Foundation.

In May 2012, Chamber Music America introduced National Chamber Music Month, a month-long initiative to raise awareness of small ensemble performance in the United States.

In September 2021, the organization appointed Kevin Kwan Loucks as its chief executive officer. He succeeded Margaret Lioi, who previously held the position for 21 years.

== National Chamber Music Month ==
In 2012, Chamber Music America introduced the first National Chamber Music Month (NCMM). According to Chamber Music America, the goals of NCMM are to "raise public awareness of the chamber music field nationally and to help ensembles and presenters attract new audiences and media attention within their own communities." National Chamber Music Month is held in May.

== See also ==
- League of American Orchestras
