= Garen Drussai =

Garen Lewis Drussai (June 17, 1916 — November 16, 2009) was an American science fiction and mystery writer, born Clara Hettler.

== Early life ==
Clara Hettler was born in the Bronx, the daughter of Benjamin Hettler, a furrier, and Annie Bessner Hettler. Her parents were immigrants from central Europe. In the 1970s, Garen Drussai earned a degree in English from the University of California Los Angeles.

== Career ==
Stories by Drussai included "Extra-Curricular" (The Magazine of Fantasy and Science Fiction, 1952), "Grim Fairy Tale" (Vortex, 1953), "The Closet" (Vortex, 1953), "The Twilight Years" (with Kirk Drussai, If, 1953), "Woman's Work" (The Magazine of Fantasy and Science Fiction, 1956), "Sugar Puss" (Sir! Droll Stories, 1967), and "Why Don't You Answer, Theodore?" (Mike Shayne's Mystery Magazine, 1970).

In "The Twilight Years", Drussai predicts the middle-class home as a site of constant marketing and advertising through appliances and the telephone. Her science fiction stories were judged by later scholars as "galactic suburbia", for their conventional domestic settings and housewife characters.

In 1977, a profile of Garen Drussai appeared in the Los Angeles Times, while she was working as a "hat-check girl" at a hotel. In the interview, she described her thrill when astronauts came to a dinner at the hotel in 1969: "On that night, I held the moon rock in my hand. It was an incredible feeling knowing that something that had come from the moon was touching my skin."

== Personal life ==
Garen Lewis lived in California for most of her adult life. In 1956 she was a member of the paint crew for a production of Much Ado About Nothing by the San Jose State College Department of Drama. In 1993, she was living in Santa Rosa, California.

She married fellow writer Kirk Drussai. They had a son in 1949; they divorced in 1959. She died in 2009, in Santa Rosa, aged 93 years.
