= Ik-Hwan Bae =

South Korean–American violinist (1956–2014)

- Born: November 19, 1956; Seoul, South Korea
- Died: July 24, 2014 (aged 57)
- Education: High School of Performing Arts (1976); Juilliard School (1980)
- Occupation: Concert violinist

Korean name
- Hangul: 배익환
- RR: Bae Ikhwan
- MR: Pae Ikhwan

Ik-Hwan Bae (November 19, 1956 – July 24, 2014) was a South Korean-born American concert violinist. A native of Seoul, he made his professional debut with the Seoul Philharmonic Orchestra at the age of 12. He attended New York City's prestigious High School of Performing Arts, graduating in 1975. While there, Bae also studied with Ivan Galamian at Juilliard's Pre-School. He went on to graduate from Juilliard four years later. His performances in recitals and concerto concerts took him to most of the major cities in Europe, Asia and the United States.

== Career ==
Bae received second prize at the Queen Elisabeth Music Competition in Brussels in 1985 and also was a prize winner at the ARD International Music Competition in Munich in 1984. In 1986, he was a recipient of the Solo Recitalist Grant from the National Endowment for the Arts.

He traveled everywhere from Seoul to Alaska as a participant in many of the world's best chamber music festivals. He was an artistic director of the Bargemusic Ltd., one of the leading presenters of chamber music in New York City, for thirteen years until 1995.

His latest project was as a concertmaster of the Hwaum Chamber Orchestra in South Korea, a conductorless string orchestra. He led them to Kraków, Poland and Puerto Rico at the Casals Festival.

Much sought after as a pedagogue, Bae taught at the Peabody Institute of the Johns Hopkins University, the Manhattan School of Music, and the Korea National University of Arts, as well as giving masterclasses worldwide. Ik-Hwan Bae was on the faculty of the Indiana University Jacobs School of Music from August 1999 until his death in 2014. He recorded for the RCA, ECM, Delos, and Koch labels. Bae was also a jury member of the Munich ARD competition in Germany, the Carl Nielsen International Violin Competition in Denmark, and the Benjamin Britten International Violin Competition in London.
