= Efren Carrillo =

American politician (born 1981)

Member of the Sonoma County Board of Supervisors
- In office November 2008 – November 2016

Personal details
- Born: March 20, 1981 (age 45) Los Angeles, California, U.S.
- Party: Democratic
- Education: University of California, Berkeley (BS)
- Website: Supervisor Efren Carrillo

Efren Carrillo (born March 20, 1981) is an American politician and businessman who served as a member of the Sonoma County Board of Supervisors from 2008 to 2012 and again from 2013 to 2015. He left office at the end of his second term in December 2016.

== Early life and education ==
Efren Carrillo was born in North Hollywood in Los Angeles, California, and moved to Mexico City, Mexico at the age of one. He was raised in Santa Rosa, California, where he lived off West Ninth Street. He graduated from Santa Rosa High School in 1999, and graduated from University of California, Berkeley in 2003 with a bachelor's degree in environmental economics and policy.

== Career ==
After graduating from UC Berkeley, Carrillo moved back to Sonoma County, where he became a project coordinator for the Sonoma County Economic Development Board designing policies. Carrillo progressed into the banking industry where he became the education and government relations manager for Redwood Credit Union. In 2007, he was recognized by the North Bay Business Journal as being one of the 40 business and community leaders under 40.

In November 2008, Carrillo was elected to the Sonoma County Board of Supervisors at the age of 27. His term ended in June 2012, and Carrillo was re-elected to be on the Board of Supervisors in January 2013. Carillo represented the 5th District, which spans the Sonoma County coast, the lower Russian River area, Sebastopol and the west and southwest Santa Rosa areas to Highway 101.

While on the Board of Supervisors, Carrillo served on the Santa Rosa Gang Prevention Task Force, Health Action Sonoma County, the Board of Directors for the Center for Volunteer and Nonprofit Leadership of Marin, Habitat for Humanity of Sonoma County, and was president of the board of the Southwest Community Health Center. Carrillo left the board when his second term ended in December 2016. He had declined to seek reelection, citing personal reasons and fallout from a recent arrest and trial.

== Personal life ==
On September 5, 2012, Carrillo was arrested at a nightclub in San Diego, and was booked on charges of misdemeanor battery and disturbing the peace. He was involved in a fight that took place that at the nightclub, and another man was seriously injured. Carrillo posted bail the same day. Charges against Carrillo were dropped in October 2012.

On the morning of July 13, 2013, Carrillo was arrested in Santa Rosa on charges of burglary, a felony, and prowling, a misdemeanor while clothed only in underwear and a pair of socks. He was released the same day after posting $40,000 bail. He released a statement in which he attributed his attempt to break into a woman's bedroom due to alcohol and he immediately entered a rehabilitation center. On October 31, 2013, Carrillo was formally charged with misdemeanor peeking in connection with the incident. On April 28, 2014, he was found not guilty of attempted peeking.
