= Stephanie St. James =

American actress

- Occupations: Singer; Actress
- Website: www.stephaniestjames.com

Stephanie St. James is an American-born actress, singer, mentor, and advocate for the disease endometriosis. St. James has been seen internationally in such productions as Broadway’s The Color Purple, adapted from the Alice Walker novel of the same name and produced by Oprah Winfrey.

== Early life and education ==
Her mother, a Russian-born Jew, is the daughter of Holocaust survivors. Her grandmother Sofia Katz was one of two Jewish survivors of the entire Jewish community in Budslav, Poland, and her grandfather David Kopelewicz a decorated partisan commander who saved the lives of hundreds of Jews during the Holocaust. Her father is of Guyanese descent and both met in Jerusalem, Israel.

Stephanie St. James grew up in the Northern California Bay Area and graduated from Santa Rosa High School. She trained at the San Francisco and Marin Ballets and studied at the American Musical and Dramatic Academy in New York City.

== Career ==
While studying at the American Musical and Dramatic Academy, St. James landed her first role in the European Tour of Fame, the musical, in her last semester of school. She later went on to originate the role of Rusty in the first national tour of Footloose the musical. She was seen by United States President Barack Obama at the Cadillac Palace Theater in her performance of The Color Purple in Chicago. Her theater resume includes such shows as Gary Marshall's Happy Days, Jesus Christ Superstar, Irish dance show Celtic Fusion, for which she recorded the soundtrack in Edinburgh, Scotland, Little Shop of Horrors, and Grease, to name a few. Also, as a recording artist, her cover tune of ABBA's "Money, Money, Money" and John Denver's "Leaving on a Jet Plane" are popular singles worldwide from her debut independent releases The St. James Experience and What Did I Do? under the alias "St. James."

== Personal life ==
St. James is the owner of AFP a children's entertainment company. Headquartered in Santa Rosa, California, the company provides characters for corporate events and parties.

After suffering for over a decade with the painful symptoms of endometriosis, she was officially diagnosed with the disease in 2003. To date, it is noted that she has survived six major surgeries from the disease, and she went public in 2007 to raise awareness. She is now an advocate for women suffering from endometriosis worldwide and is known as one of the first celebrity women suffering from the disease to go public.

== St. James Acting Studio ==
Launched The St. James Acting Studio, which opened its doors in Miami, Florida, in the fall of 2010 and offers training in film, TV, commercials, musical theater, and voice-overs. Her students have been seen in such Broadway shows as Hamilton the Musical, films as Tom Cruise's Rock of Ages and the TV series Magic City, and Burn Notice.

== Awards and recognition ==
For her performance as Squeak in “The Color Purple,” she was nominated in 2008 for an NAACP Theater Award” Best Supporting Actress."

Stephanie received the 2010 San Francisco Broadway World Fan Award for Best Leading Actress in a Musical Local, for her role as Mimi in Rent at 6th Street Playhouse in Northern California.

Stephanie was also honored with the 2011 FREC Award by The Film Recording Entertainment Council in 2011 for Acting Coach of South Florida.
