= Grande Ronde Aquifer =

Aquifer

Coordinates: 46.75°N 117.11°W

The Grande Ronde Aquifer is part of the regional Columbia Basin basalt aquifer system in the northwest United States, and is one of three aquifer systems that make up the Water Resource Inventory Area (WRIA) 32, along with the Wanapum and Saddle Mountain aquifers. The aquifer is the main source of drinking water for the primary population centers of the Palouse; the university cities of Pullman, Washington, and Moscow, Idaho.

For several decades the water levels in the Grande Ronde Aquifer have been in decline – up to three feet (0.9 m) per year – due to pumping by the cities and universities.
