= Colin Carr =

British cellist

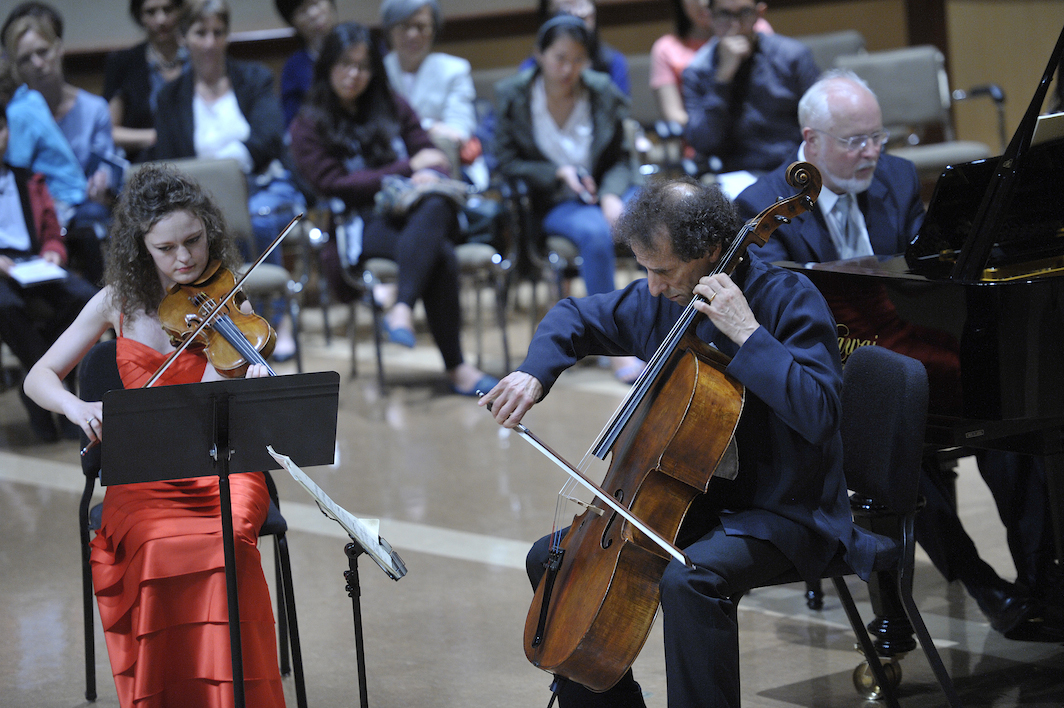
Violinist Iryna Krechkovsky, cellist Colin Carr and pianist Julian Martin performing at Chapman University on 23 May 2014

Colin Carr (born 25 October 1957) is a British cello soloist, chamber musician, recording artist and teacher.

== Biography ==
Born in Liverpool, Carr is professor of cello at the Royal Academy of Music. He taught at the New England Conservatory in Boston for 16 years before joining the Royal Academy's faculty. He is affiliated with the State University of New York at Stony Brook. Carr has won many international awards, including First Prize in the Naumburg Competition, the Gregor Piatigorsky Memorial Award, Second Prize in the Rostropovich International Cello Competition and the Young Concert artists competition.

Carr began playing at the age of five, and studied with Maurice Gendron. He also attended the Yehudi Menuhin School. He formerly played the 'Marquis de Corberon' Stradivari cello, formerly played by Zara Nelsova and now played by Steven Isserlis, and owned by the Royal Academy of Music. He now plays a Venetian cello made by Matteo Goffriller.

He is married with three children, and lives in Oxfordshire.
