= Glenn Dicterow =

American violinist (born 1948)

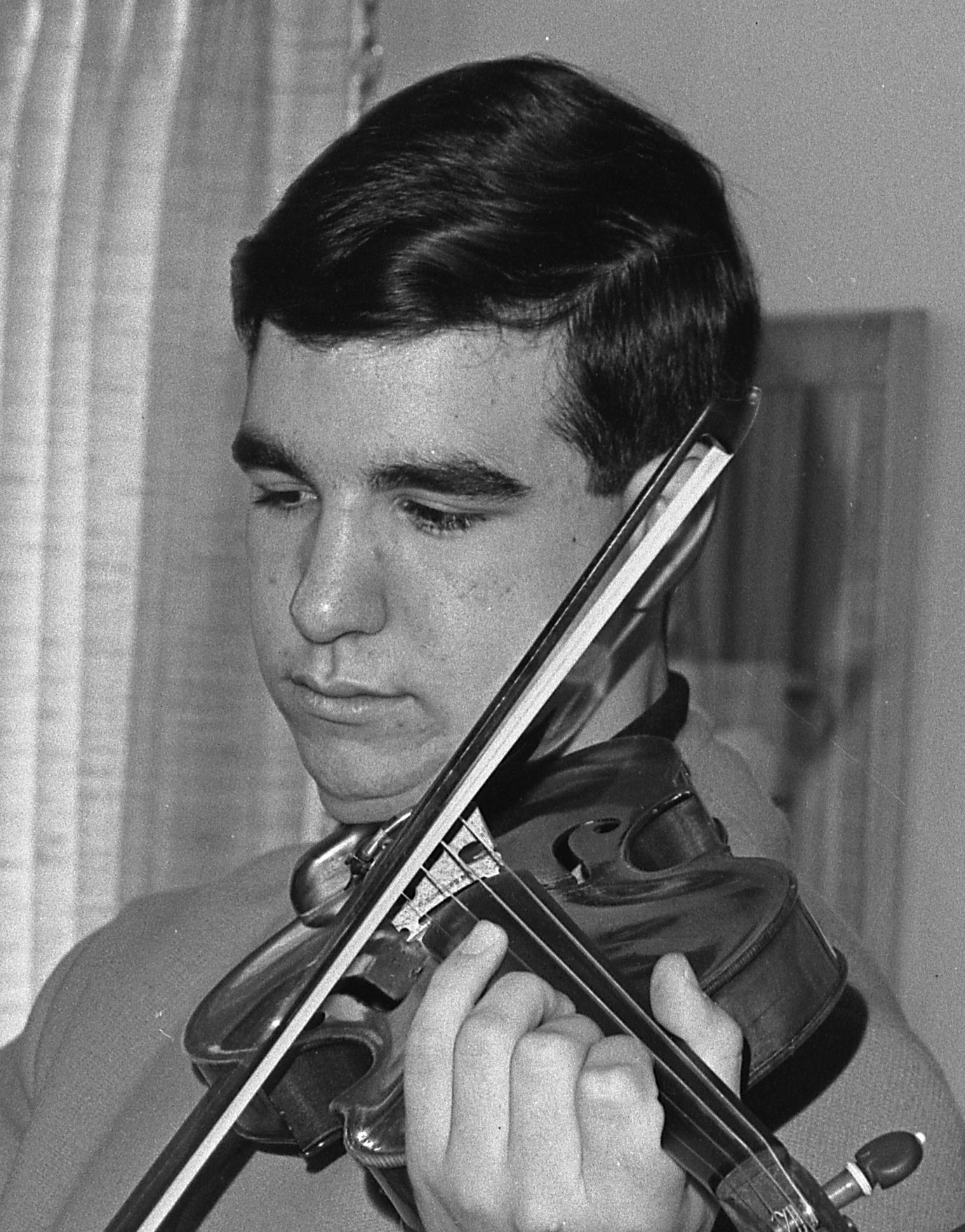
- Dicterow in 1964

Background information
- Born: December 23, 1948 (age 77); Los Angeles, California, United States
- Genre: Classical
- Occupation: Violinist
- Instrument: Violin
- Years active: 1950s–present
- Website: glenndicterow.com

Glenn Dicterow (born December 23, 1948) is an American violinist and former concertmaster of the New York Philharmonic Orchestra. He is on the faculty of the University of Southern California's Thornton School of Music where he holds the Jascha Heifetz Chair in violin as well as serving as a faculty artist at the Music Academy of the West.

He joined the Los Angeles Philharmonic as associate concertmaster in 1971, later assuming the role of concertmaster in 1973. His tenure with the New York Philharmonic began in 1980 and lasted until 2014. Dicterow holds the record as the New York Philharmonic's longest-serving concertmaster, holding the role for 34 years.

Dicterow's accolades include winning the Young Musicians Foundation Award and Coleman Award (Los Angeles), The Julia Klumpke Award (San Francisco), and the Bronze Medal in the International Tchaikovsky Competition (1970). He is a graduate of the Juilliard School, where he was a student of Ivan Galamian.

== Career ==
At the age of 11, Dicterow made his solo debut with the Los Angeles Philharmonic, performing Tchaikovsky's Violin Concerto. In 1967 at age 18, he appeared as a soloist with the New York Philharmonic under the baton of Andre Kostelanetz, presenting the Tchaikovsky Violin Concerto. He joined the Los Angeles Philharmonic full-time in 1971, initially serving as associate concertmaster before becoming concertmaster in 1973.

In 1980, Dicterow transitioned to the New York Philharmonic as concertmaster. Notable moments in his career include being featured in Leonard Bernstein's Serenade during a New York Philharmonic tour of major American cities in 1986 with Bernstein himself conducting, performing at the White House in 1982, and playing Carmen Fantasy under Zubin Mehta's direction in a Live from Lincoln Center concert telecast in 1990. Internationally, Dicterow has appeared with the Leipzig Gewandhaus Orchestra and the Hong Kong Philharmonic. During his tenure with the philharmonic, he worked with music directors Zubin Mehta, Kurt Masur, Lorin Maazel, and Alan Gilbert.

On May 24, 2012, Dicterow announced his decision to step down as concertmaster of the New York Philharmonic, embarking on a new chapter by joining the faculty at the University of Southern California. He assumed the role of the first Robert Mann Endowed Chair in Violin and Chamber Music at USC's Thornton School of Music. The appointment began in the fall of 2013, although Dicterow stayed with the New York Philharmonic through the end of the 2013–2014 season. In March 2022, the Thornton School of Music named Dicterow the Jascha Heifetz Chair in Violin.

== Personal life ==
Dicterow is the son of Harold Dicterow, who served as principal of the second violin section in the Los Angeles Philharmonic for 52 years. He is married to violist Karen Dreyfus.

== Discography ==
Dicterow's discography includes Aaron Copland's Violin Sonata, Largo, and Piano Trio; Charles Ives's Sonatas Nos. 2 and 4 and Piano Trio; and Erich Wolfgang Korngold's Piano Trio and Violin Sonata, all for EMI. He is also featured in the violin solos in Richard Strauss's Ein Heldenleben and Also sprach Zarathustra with Zubin Mehta for CBS. Other compositions for disc are works of Wieniawski with Zubin Mehta and the Los Angeles Philharmonic; Lee Holdridge's Violin Concerto with the London Symphony Orchestra and Holdridge conducting; Shostakovich's Violin Concerto No. 1 with the New York Philharmonic conducted by Maxim Shostakovich on a Radiothon recording; and the philharmonic's recording of Rimsky-Korsakov's Scheherazade with Yuri Temirkanov on the BMG label. Dicterow and his wife, Karen Dreyfus, also recorded the Mozart Sinfonia Concertante in E-Flat Major for Violin, Viola and Orchestra, K. 364, and William Thomas McKinley's Concert Variations with the Warsaw Philharmonic National Orchestra, conducted by Carl St.Clair (MMC Recordings).

== Filmography ==
Dicterow can also be heard in the violin solos of the film scores for:

- The Turning Point
- The Untouchables
- Altered States
- Aladdin
- Beauty and the Beast
- Interview with the Vampire
