= Karen Dreyfus =

Karen Dreyfus is an American violist who currently teaches at the USC Thornton School of Music. Ms. Dreyfus has distinguished herself as a recipient of many prizes, including the Naumburg Viola Competition (1982), the Lionel Tertis International Viola Competition (1980), the Washington International Competition (1979), and the Hudson Valley Competition (1978). Ms. Dreyfus has concertized extensively in the United States, Canada, Europe, Asia, and South America.

Some of her musical collaborations have been with Musicians From Marlboro, New York Philomusica, Theater Chamber Players of the Kennedy Center, the New York Philharmonic, and the Orpheus Chamber Orchestra. She has performed in recital with Yehudi Menuhin at Carnegie Hall and has also collaborated with such artists as Rudolf Serkin; Alexander Schneider; Leon Fleisher; Chick Corea; and her husband, Glenn Dicterow.

== Early life ==
Born into a family of musicians, she began studying the violin with her father, a member of the Philadelphia Orchestra, and later decided to pursue a career on the viola under the tutelage of Leonard Mogill. Other teachers have included Heidi Castleman and Martha Katz. A 1979 graduate of the Curtis Institute of Music, where she studied with Michael Tree and Karen Tuttle, Ms. Dreyfus moved to the New York area, where she performs solo concerts and chamber music recitals and teaches viola, orchestral excerpts, and chamber music.

== Career ==
Ms. Dreyfus has also served on the faculties of the Third Street Music School Settlement, SUNY Purchase, and Queens College. In 2001 she began teaching a class in orchestral repertoire at Juilliard. Ms. Dreyfus is a co-founding member of the Lyric Piano Quartet, which is quartet in residence at Queens College. She has had many pieces written for her and has premiered pieces by composers such as Ezra Laderman, Elizabeth Brown, and William Thomas McKinley, among others.

=== CDs ===
Karen Dreyfus has received a National Endowment for the Arts Solo Recitalists Award and has performed extensively throughout the United States. She has also recorded many CDs. Her premiere recording with Bridge Records, entitled Romanze, was received with much critical acclaim. American Record Guide cites Ms. Dreyfus as “a terrific player with impeccable technique and intonation, beautiful tone, and real musicianship. Her playing is highly expressive and responsive to the many moods elicited by this varied program.”

=== Poland ===
In 1995 Karen Dreyfus was invited to Poland to record the William Walton Viola Concerto with the Warsaw Philharmonic. It has been released by MMC Recordings. She recorded works for viola and orchestra of eight American composers with the Silesian Philharmonic. In 1997, Ms. Dreyfus recorded and premiered three more solo works with the Czech Radio Symphony of Prague. These CDs have all been released on the MMC label. The latest CD for MMC has been the a recording of Mozart’s Sinfonia Concertante, along with a piece written for Ms. Dreyfus and Glenn Dicterow, released in 2002, entitled The Music of Mozart and McKinley. Dreyfus is also featured on the Navona Records label.

=== Lyric Piano Quartet ===
Most recently, Karen Dreyfus’s chamber ensemble, the Lyric Piano Quartet, has released a recording of piano quartet works of Strauss and Turina for Black Box Records. It has been given the honor of being nominated as “Editor's Choice” by Gramophone magazine. BBC Magazine said the Lyric Piano Quartet “marry the old-fashioned virtues of portamento and warm vibrato to a quicksilver intelligence.”

== Discography ==
With Chick Corea and Gary Burton

- Lyric Suite for Sextet (ECM, 1982)
