= Adam Ben Ezra =

Israeli musical artist

Adam Ben Ezra אָדָם בֶּן עֶזְרָא
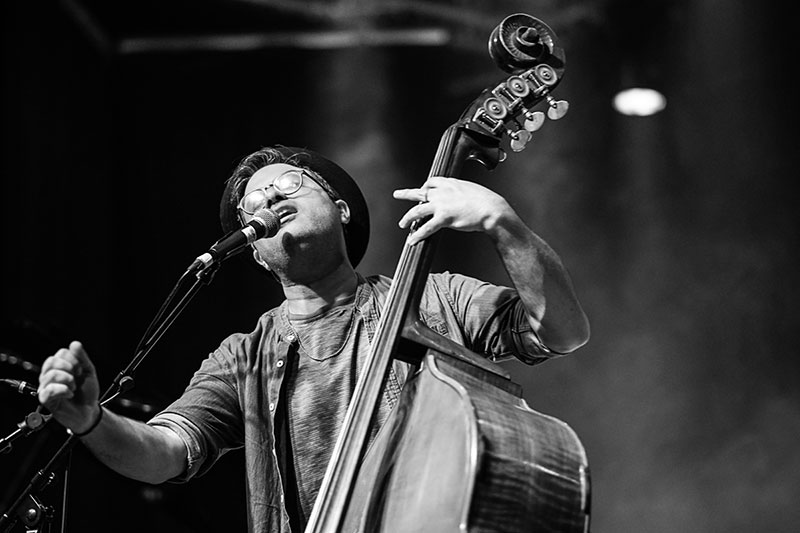
- Denmark 2019

Background information
- Born: 18 December 1982 (age 43); Tel Aviv, Israel
- Genres: Modern jazz, world music, rock
- Occupations: Double bassist, multi-instrumentalist, composer, educator
- Instruments: Double bass, piano, oud, cajon, guitar, bass guitar, clarinet, flute
- Years active: 2000-present
- Website: www.adambenezra.com

Adam Ben Ezra (Hebrew: אָדָם בֶּן עֶזְרָא, lit. 'Adam, son of Ezra'; born December 18, 1982, in Tel Aviv, Israel) is an Israeli self-taught multi-instrumentalist, composer and educator, known for his double bass performances.

== Early life ==
Growing up in Tel Aviv, Adam began playing the violin when he was five years old before picking up the guitar when he was nine. Following a stint with the electric bass at 16 he discovered the instrument that would come to be most associated with him when he began studying the double bass.

== Career ==
Adam began his musical career performing in jazz clubs and cafes and playing with several local musicians and ensembles. He got his early break in 2008 when his upright bass version of the theme tune for the TV show Seinfeld as well as his rendition of Michael Jackson's "Billie Jean" gained viral success. This caught the attention of American label CandyRat Records who released the singles "Openland" and "Flamenco" in 2012.

That same year Adam's playing was featured on the Amnesty International 'Chimes of Freedom: The Songs of Bob Dylan' album playing on songwriter Oren Lavie's version of the track "4th Time Around".

2013 was a key year for Adam with solo shows in Europe and the United States including appearances at the International Society of Bassists convention in Rochester, New York, fr:Gaume Jazz Festival in Belgium, and Musica in Borgo in Termoli, Italy, where he also featured as a guest artist during Sarah Jane Morris' set. In addition he supported the likes of Richard Bona, Mike Stern and Victor Wooten. He also appeared on a cover of the Pearl Jam track 'Jeremy' by the metal band Orphaned Land. A few months later Adam began his ongoing collaboration with internationally renowned singer Achinoam Nini ("Noa"), appearing on her 2014 album Love Medicine as well as joining her on tours in North America and Europe that included a show with George Dalaras and Dulce Pontes at the Acropolis in Athens.

In 2014 Adam joined renowned classical musicians Igudesman & Joo (Aleksey Igudesman and Hyung-ki Joo) for their League of X-traordinary Musicians Showpiece, performing a New Year's Eve show at the Vienna Konzerthaus alongside a talented multinational ensemble. That same year he also formed the new Adam Ben Ezra Trio which toured Europe including performances at Catania Jazz Festival in Italy. In 2015 Adam crowd-funded his debut album Can't Stop Running through a PledgeMusic campaign. The cover art for the album, photographed by Ezra Gozo Mansur, was also selected as one of the best photos of 2015 by Communication Arts magazine.

In the summer of 2015 Adam appeared at the Pilsen Festival and Pacovský Poledník Festival as well as a sold-out show at the Jazz Dock Club in Prague as part of his tour in the Czech Republic. Later that year he again joined forces with Igudesman & Joo at the 'Lucerne Festival' in Switzerland, and also performed solo concerts at The Romanian National Opera, in Timișoara, Romania and at the Double Bass Passion Festival in Belgrade, Serbia.

Besides touring extensively, Adam published the albums "Pin Drop", recorded at Little Big Beat Studios in Liechtenstein and released on Ropeadope Records in 2017, and "Hide and Seek" in 2020.

== YouTube ==
In addition to his live music playing Adam has made a name for himself through his YouTube channel. To date his videos have gained more than 7 million views and his original video for "Can't Stop Running" has generated more than 1 million views. He is well known for his takes on TV theme songs such as 'Dexter' and 'Mad Men'.

== Influences ==
Adam has cited Bach, Sting, Debussy, Chick Corea, Eddie Gomez and Jaco Pastorius, Flamenco and Arabic music as his musical inspiration. Adam is considered a pioneer in a new style of playing on the upright bass, in which he plays and drums on his instrument at the same time in order to obtain a rich groove sound.

== Instruments ==
As well as playing the double bass, he is known for incorporating various instruments in his live performances and recordings, including the piano, bass guitar, guitar, clarinet, oud, flute and cajon, and for his use of a loop and effect pedals.
