= Pianomania =

- Directed by: Lilian Franck; Robert Cibis
- Written by: Lilian Franck, Robert Cibis
- Produced by: Vincent Lucassen, Ebba Sinzinger, Robert Cibis, Lilian Franck
- Starring: Stefan Knüpfer; Pierre-Laurent Aimard; Alfred Brendel; Rudolf Buchbinder; Julius Drake; Till Fellner; Lang Lang; Igudesman & Joo
- Cinematography: Jerzy Palacz, Robert Cibis
- Edited by: Michèle Barbin
- Production companies: WILDArtFILM; OVALmedia Berlin&Cologne, OVALinternational GbR
- Release date: 2009
- Running time: 93 minutes
- Countries: Germany, Austria
- Languages: German, English

Pianomania is a 2009 German-Austrian documentary film by directors Lilian Franck and Robert Cibis. The film presents Stefan Knüpfer, a virtuoso piano tuner from the piano company Steinway & Sons, in his work with pianists such as Lang Lang, Alfred Brendel and Pierre-Laurent Aimard.

== Synopsis ==
The collaborative work between Pierre-Laurent Aimard and Stefan Knüpfer is at the centre of the film. Bach's The Art of Fugue is to be recorded. Pierre-Laurent Aimard has decided in favour of concert grand piano Nr. 109 for the Bach recording. The film begins one year before the recording.

Knüpfer wants to study instruments from the time of Bach for Aimard. He experiments with sound absorbers made from felt and with glass sound mirrors. But as fate will have it, the number 109 grand piano is sold to Australia a few months later; and that is not the last obstacle that gets in their way. Knüpfer and Aimard meet regularly, and when the tension is so thick it can be cut with a knife, Knüpfer saves the day with his sense of humour. The road toward the pianist’s longed for “bravo” is long.

One afternoon, a rather sleepy musician in jeans and sneakers shows up. It is the Chinese star pianist Lang Lang, who will be giving a guest performance in the Viennese concert hall. Still suffering from jet lag, he has to choose an instrument to play. His overcrowded tour calendar leaves little time for individual settings. Instead, and almost shyly, he asks for a heavy bench that will hold up through his extrovert style of playing without sliding around. The piano superstar completes his performance in the large hall in a dark suit and wild hairstyle. The bench holds up, and he receives thunderous applause.

The sketches of the comedy duo Igudesman & Joo always parody the elitist music world. Together with Knüpfer they come up with some of the craziest scenarios for the next show.

One of Alfred Brendel's last concerts takes place at the Grafenegg Music Festival. Knüpfer prepares the piano for him while the star pianist gives his directions humorously.

== Technical aspects ==
Corresponding to the struggle of the protagonists to find the perfect sound, the sound recording of the film itself was made with great efforts. All the scenes were recorded in Dolby Surround quality and on up to 90 separate sound tracks.

== Nominations, awards and prizes ==
- Lola, German Oscar, category Best sound (Deutscher Filmpreis)
- Golden Gate Award as best documentary (San Francisco International Film Festival)
- Audience award for the best documentary (International Filmweekend Würzburg)
- ‘Lüdia’, first prize (Cinema Festival in Lünen)
- Award for "Best Editing” (Diagonale)
- Best film, category ‘Week of the Critic’(Locarno International Film Festival)
- Nominated for European Film Prize (European Film Academy)
- Nominated for Austrian Film Prize
- Rating ‘Highly Recommended’ by The Film Evaluation Committee in Wiesbaden
- Honourable Mention (EURODOK film festival, Oslo)

== Official selection in international festivals ==
=== 2009 ===
- International Documentary Film Festival (IDFA), Netherlands
- Max-Ophüls-Preis, Germany
- Kinofest Lünen, Germany
- Hof International Film Festival, Germany
- Unerhört Hamburg, Germany
- Diagonale, Austria
- Cork Festival, Ireland
- Locarno International Film Festival, Switzerland
- Zurich Film Festival, Switzerland
- Valladolid International Film Festival, Spain
- Sheffield Doc/Fest, Great Britain
- SoNoRo Bucharest, Romania

=== 2010 ===
- The Magnificent 7, Serbia
- Internationales Filmwochenende Würzburg, Germany
- Göteborg International Film Festival, Sweden
- Internationale Filmfestspiele Berlin (Berlinale), Germany
- Jameson Dublin IFF, Ireland
- Zagrebdox, Croatia
- Sofia International Film Festival, Bulgaria
- 34th Hong Kong International Film Festival, China
- Macau International Film Festival, China
- BAFICI – Festival International de Cinema Independiente Buenos Aires, Argentina
- St. Paul International Film Festival Minneapolis, USA
- Doc Outlook-Market, Switzerland
- San Francisco International Festival, USA
- DOK.Fest München, Germany
- Planet Doc Review Film Festival, Poland
- Moscow International Film Festival, Russia
- Melbourne International Film Festival, Australia
- New Zealand International Film Festival, New Zealand
- Semana de Cine Aleman in Cinemateca Nacional Mexico City, Mexico
- Austrian Cultural Forum in Washington DC, USA
- Flickers – Rhode Island International Film Festival, USA
- Jecheon International Music & Film Festival, South Korea
- Ghent Film Festival, Belgium
- Berlin & Beyond Festival San Francisco, USA
- Golden Horse Film Festival, Taiwan
- Canberra Film Festival, Australia
- St. George Brisbane International Film Festival, Australia
- PIANO-PAM! Internationales Festival für Neue Klaviermusik Uster, Switzerland
- IDOCS International Documentary Forum Beijing, China

== Directors biography ==
- Lilian Franck studied at the Film Academy Baden-Württemberg and at Le Fresnoy, the National Studio of Contemporary Arts in France. In 2002, she received the French-German prize for Young Journalism for the humorous documentary “Half a Chance,” which she co-directed with Robert Cibis. After this collaboration, the pair founded the filmmaking company OVAL Filmemacher in Berlin, Germany. In 2009, Lilian Franck co-directed Pianomania, which premiered in more than 20 countries and was awarded, among others, the prize of “Semaine de la critique” at the Locarno International Film Festival, the Golden Gate Award at the San Francisco International Film Festival and the German Deutscher Filmpreis “Lola” for Best Sound.
- Robert Cibis studied at the Film Academy Baden-Württemberg, FÉMIS, École Nationale Supérieure des Métiers de l'Image et du Son and Le Sorbonne Nouvelle. In 2002, he received the French-German prize for Young Journalism for the humorous documentary “Half a Chance,” which he co-directed with Lilian Franck. After this collaboration, the pair founded the filmmaking company OVAL Filmemacher in Berlin, Germany. Since, he has produced scientific documentaries for television on the theme of health. In 2007, Robert Cibis and Michaela Kirst received the Slovenian Festival Prize “EKOTOPFILM” for their project DISGUSTINGLY HEALTHY which uncovered the use of maggots, called maggot therapy, in the medical field. In 2009, Robert Cibis co-directed Pianomania.

== Played tracks in the movie and artists ==
- Béla Bartók – Klavierkonzert Nr. 2, Sz 95 (Radio-Symphonieorchester Wien, Orchestra – Péter Eötvös, Director – Pierre-Laurent Aimard, Piano)
- Robert Schumann – Fantasie C-dur, op. 17 (Lang Lang, Piano)
- Wolfgang Amadeus Mozart – Sonate Nr. 13 (Lang Lang, Piano)
- Franz Liszt – Ungarische Rhapsodie Nr. 6 (Lang Lang, Piano)
- Jan Pieterszoon Sweelinck – Mein junges Leben hat ein End (Ingomar Rainer, Clavichord)
- Jan Pieterszoon Sweelinck – Baletto del Granduca (Ingomar Rainer, Cembalo)
- Ludwig van Beethoven – Klavierkonzert Nr. 3, op. 37 (Till Fellner)
- Maurice Ravel – "Ondine", Gaspard de la nuit (Till Fellner)
- Johannes Brahms – Sommerabend, op. 85 (Heinrich Heine, Text - Julius Drake, Piano - Ian Bostridge, Tenor)
- Joseph Haydn – Sonate, Hob. XVI: 20 (Alfred Brendel, Piano)
- Franz Schubert – "Impromptu“ Nr. 1, op. 142 (Alfred Brendel, Piano)
- Ludwig van Beethoven – Sonate Nr. 31, op. 110, 3. Satz (Fuga. Allegro ma non troppo) (Alfred Brendel, Piano)
- Thomas Koschat – Schneewalzer (Stefan Knüpfer tuning the 109 grand at styriarte)
- Wolfgang Amadeus Mozart – Klavierkonzert Nr. 13, KV 415 (Chamber Orchestra of Europe - Pierre-Laurent Aimard, Piano and Director)
- Frédéric Chopin – Prelude, op. 45 (Client buying the 109 grand)
- Erik Satie – Gymnopédie (Hyung-ki Joo, Piano)
- Ludwig van Beethoven – Für Elise (Sketch from "A Little Nightmare Music": Hyung-ki Joo, Piano - Aleksey Igudesman, Violin)
- Johann Sebastian Bach – Die Kunst der Fuge, BWV 1080 (Pierre-Laurent Aimard, Piano)
- Sergei W. Rachmaninoff – Rhapsodie über ein Thema von Paganini fur Klavier und Orchester, op. 43 (Rudolf Buchbinder, Piano)
- Elliott Carter – Caténaires (Pierre-Laurent Aimard)
