= Nozaki =

Nozaki (written: 野崎) is a Japanese surname. Notable people with the surname include:

- Albert Nozaki (1912–2003), art director
- Chiharu Nozaki (野崎 千春, born 1973), Japanese speed skater
- Hitoshi Nozaki (born 1922), Japanese chemist
- Keiichi Nozaki (born 1961), Japanese anime music producer
- Kojoro Nozaki (1872–1946), Japanese Imperial Navy admiral
- Kyoko Nozaki (born 1964), Japanese chemist
- Masaya Nozaki (born 1993), Japanese footballer
- Nagisa Nozaki (born 1990), Japanese professional wrestler
- Takao Nozaki, Japanese entomologist
- Yoko Nozaki, pianist and musician
- Yōsuke Nozaki (born 1985), Japanese footballer

== Fictional characters ==
- Umetaro Nozaki, the titular character of manga series Monthly Girls' Nozaki-kun

== See also ==
- Nozaki Station (disambiguation)
