= Oleg Maisenberg =

Russian-Austrian pianist and teacher (1945–2026)

- Олег Майзенберг
- Maisenberg, in c. 1995
- Born: 29 April 1945; Odessa, Ukrainian SSR, Soviet Union
- Died: 16 April 2026 (aged 80)
- Occupations: Classical pianist; Academic teacher
- Organizations: University of Music and Performing Arts Vienna
- Awards: Austrian Decoration for Science and Art

Oleg Iosifovich Maisenberg (Russian: Олег Иосифович Майзенберг; 29 April 1945 – 16 April 2026) was a Soviet and Austrian pianist and academic teacher. Based in Vienna from 1981, he made an international career as a soloist with orchestras, a recitalist and a chamber music player, especially interpreting music of the 19th century such as Franz Schubert's. Maisenberg was both a master of the Russian tradition of piano playing and of sensitive attention to nuances, and a longtime duo partner to violinist Gidon Kremer. He was a professor at the University of Music and Performing Arts Vienna from 1998 until 2013.

== Life and career ==
Maisenberg was born to a Jewish family in Odessa on 29 April 1945. He received piano lessons from his mother from age five. He studied at the Central Music School in Kishinev and at the Gnessin Institute in Moscow with Alexander Jocheles. In 1967 he won the competition Music of the 20th Century and also achieved second prize at the "International Schubert Competition" in Vienna. From 1971 to 1980 he appeared regularly as a soloist with the Moscow Philharmonic Orchestra and other renowned orchestras of the Soviet Union.

=== Move to Vienna and international career ===
In 1981 Maisenberg emigrated to Vienna. He performed as a soloist with the Israel Philharmonic, the Philadelphia Orchestra, the London Symphony Orchestra, the Vienna Symphony Orchestra and the Berlin Philharmonic, with the conductors Christoph von Dohnányi, Zubin Mehta, Eugene Ormandy, Herbert Blomstedt, Stanisław Skrowaczewski, Neeme Järvi, Rafael Frühbeck de Burgos, Georges Prêtre, Alain Lombard, Michel Plasson, Nikolaus Harnoncourt, Vladimir Fedosejev, and Esa-Pekka Salonen.

Maisenberg appeared frequently with chamber orchestras including the Orpheus Chamber Orchestra of New York City, the Chamber Orchestra of Europe, the Deutsche Kammerphilharmonie Bremen, and the Lithuanian Chamber Orchestra. In chamber music, he collaborated with singers Hermann Prey and Robert Holl, oboist Heinz Holliger, pianist András Schiff, violinist Renaud Capuçon and cellist Gautier Capuçon, among others. His collaboration with the violinist Gidon Kremer commenced during his early years in Russia. The tension of their creative collaboration was due to the contrast between Kremer's extravagant playing and Maisenberg's restrained and subtle piano playing.

Maisenberg appeared at major festivals including the Lockenhaus Chamber Music Festival, Schwetzingen Festival, the Salzburg Festival, Lucerne Festival, Piano Festival Ruhr and Sviatoslav Richter Festival in Moscow, among others. He performed in recitals throughout the world. His broad repertoire of all eras focused on the music of the 19th century; Chopin's Nocturnes were a highlight of his programs. He performed 121 times at the Vienna Konzerthaus, including a series of 12 recitals in the 1994/95 season with each recital dedicated to one composer.

Maisenberg was professor of piano at the Musikhochschule Stuttgart from 1985 to 1998, and then at the University of Music and Performing Arts Vienna until 2013, influencing many students, including Till Fellner, Moto Harada, Hyung-ki Joo and Khatia Buniatishvili.

Maisenberg died on 16 April 2026, at the age of 80.

== Recordings ==
Maisenberg participated in recordings and TV productions with works by Schubert, Schumann, Liszt, Rachmaninov, Scriabin, Stravinsky, Berg, Webern, Schönberg, and Darius Milhaud, published by Orfeo, Harmonia Mundi, Teldec and Deutsche Grammophon, and recordings of chamber music were released by ECM, Preiser Records and Philips. He recorded an album of French music for clarinet and piano with Sabine Meyer. Selections of his Konzerthaus concerts were issued on five CDs, reissued by the Glissando label.

== Honours ==
In April 1995, Maisenberg was awarded the title of "Honorary Member" of the Wiener Konzerthaus Society. Then-federal Chancellor Wolfgang Schüssel awarded the Austrian Decoration for Science and Art to Maisenberg in 2005.
