= Rudolf Buchbinder =

Austrian classical pianist

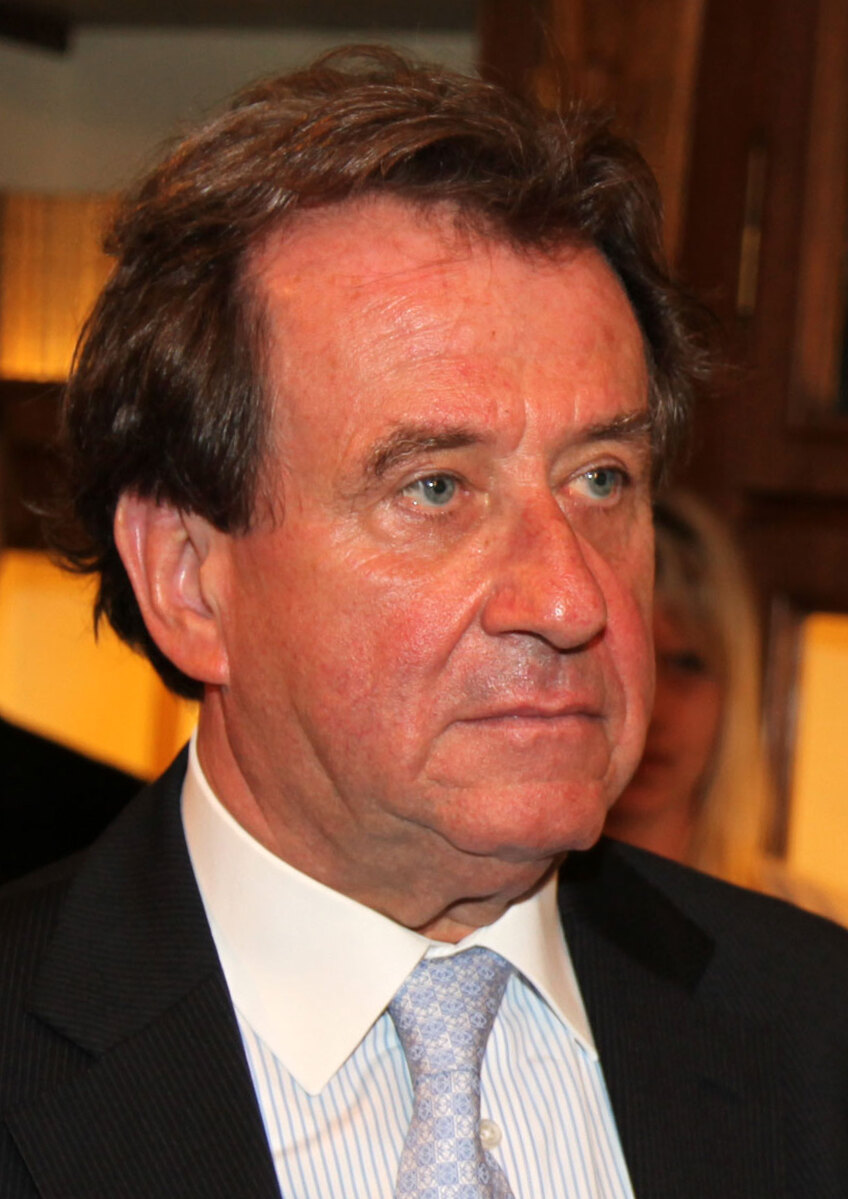
- Buchbinder in 2010

Background information
- Born: 1 December 1946; Litoměřice, Czechoslovakia
- Education: Vienna Academy of Music
- Years active: 1965–present
- Award: Echo Klassik (2012)

Rudolf Buchbinder (born 1 December 1946) is an Austrian classical pianist. Trained at the Vienna Academy of Music, he has performed internationally as a soloist and with the Vienna Philharmonic. He is best known for his comprehensive recordings of Haydn, Mozart, and Beethoven.

He is the founder and artistic director of the International Music Festival in Grafenegg Castle since 2007. He was awarded the Echo Klassik award for Instrumentalist of the Year in 2012 and became an honorary member of the Vienna Philharmonic in 2016.

== Biography ==
Buchbinder was born in Litoměřice (German: Leitmeritz), a town in northern Bohemia, then part of postwar Czechoslovakia, in 1946. His mother was from Vienna and had traveled there to settle paperwork after the death of her first husband, who was from Leitmeritz. They returned to Vienna in 1947, and he lived with his mother, grandmother, and half-brother Klaus in a small apartment in Vienna's 7th district.

He began his formal musical training with Bruno Seidlhofer at the Vienna Academy of Music. In 1965, he made a tour of North and South Americas. The following year, he won a special prize awarded at the Van Cliburn International Piano Competition. Subsequently he has toured with the Vienna Philharmonic and appeared as soloist around the world.

He has also taught piano at the Basel Academy of Music.

For the Teldec label he has recorded the complete keyboard music of Haydn, all Mozart's major works for piano, all the Beethoven piano sonatas and variations, and both Brahms piano concertos with Harnoncourt and the Royal Concertgebouw Orchestra of Amsterdam. With János Starker, he recorded memorable performances of works for cello and piano by Beethoven and Brahms. He has twice recorded the Beethoven piano concertos conducting from the keyboard, first with the Vienna Symphony Orchestra for the Preiser label in 2007, and then with the Vienna Philharmonic for the Sony label in 2011; this cycle was recorded live in concert and released on both CD and DVD.

He is one of the few pianists to have ever recorded the entire Part II of Vaterländischer Künstlerverein, which consists of 50 variations by 50 different composers on a waltz by Anton Diabelli. He has also recorded Beethoven's Diabelli Variations, which originally comprised Part I of that anthology. Buchbinder is a life-long interpreter of Mozart's piano concertos and sonatas, usually conducting them from the keyboard. This shows that Mozart's music is at the heart of his repertoire.

Since 2007, Buchbinder has been the artistic director of the Grafenegg Festival.

In 2009, Buchbinder was featured in the award-winning German-Austrian documentary Pianomania, about a Steinway & Sons piano tuner, which was directed by Lilian Franck and Robert Cibis. The film premiered theatrically in North America, where it was met with positive reviews by The New York Times, as well as in Asia and throughout Europe, and is a part of the Goethe-Institut catalogue.

== Decorations and awards ==
- 1961: First Prize at the International Competition in Munich, division "Piano Trio"
- 1962: Lipatti Medal
- 1966: Special prize awarded at the Van Cliburn International Piano Competition
- 1970: Mozart Interpretation Prize of the Austrian Minister for Education and the Arts
- 1977: Grand Prix du Disque for the entire piano works of Joseph Haydn
- 1989: Austrian Cross of Honour for Science and Art
- 1992: Honorary Member of the Vienna Symphony
- 1994: Honorary Member of the Carinthian Summer
- 1995: Austrian Cross of Honour for Science and Art, 1st class
- 1996: Great Merit of the Province of Salzburg
- 1996: Grand Gold Decoration of Carinthia
- 1996: Bruckner Ring of the Vienna Symphony
- 1996: Gold Medal for services to the City of Vienna
- 1999: Grand Gold Decoration of Lower Austria
- 2003: Grand Gold Decoration for Services to the Republic of Austria
- 2004: Gold Medal of Salzburg
- 2007: Gold Medal of the Austrian capital Vienna
- 2008: Honorary Member of the Society of Friends of Music in Vienna
- 2010: Tourism Award of the State of Lower Austria for his work in music tourism in Grafenegg
- 2011: Gloria Artis, Medal for Merit to Culture
- 2012: Echo Klassik in German music award as Instrumentalist of the Year (piano) and the album Beethoven: The Sonata Legacy issued by RCA Red Seal/Sony
- 2016: Honorary member of the Vienna Philharmonic
- 2017: Vienna Mozart Prize

== Sources ==
- Slonimsky, Nicolas; Kuhn, Laura Diane; McIntire, Dennis (1997). Baker's Biographical Dictionary of Twentieth-Century Classical Musicians. New York: Schirmer Books. ISBN 978-0-02-871271-0.
