= Heiichirō =

- Gender: Male

Origin
- Origin: Japanese
- Meaning: Different meanings depending on the kanji used

Heiichirō, Heiichiro, Heiichirou or Heiichiroh (written: 平一郎) is a masculine Japanese given name. Notable people with the name include:

- Heiichiro Ito (伊藤 平一郎; born 1990), Japanese rugby union player
- Heiichiro Ohyama (大山 平一郎; born 1947), Japanese conductor and violist
