= Jacob Shaw =

Jacob Shaw may refer to:

- Jacob Shaw (musician) (born 1988), classical cellist
- Jacob Shaw (comics), a fictional character in Marvel Comics
