= Bobby Chen (pianist) =

Malaysian pianist

Bobby Chen is a Malaysian pianist. He has been praised by The Independent, Guardian, Irish Examiner, and Straits Times newspapers and was described by International Piano Magazine as "an armour-clad player of complete technique, a thinking musician, a natural Romantic. Young bloods come no better". Chen has performed as soloist under conductors Mathias Bamert, Maximiliano Valdes, Lan Shui, Neville Marriner, Yehudi Menuhin, and Pierre-Andre Valade and concerti with the Academy of St Martin in the Fields, London Sinfonietta, Warsaw Sinfonia, Singapore Symphony Orchestra and Malaysian Philharmonic Orchestra.

Bobby is the founder of Overseas Masters Winter Piano Academy (OMWPA), which established in December 2010.

== Education ==
A graduate of the Yehudi Menuhin School and the Royal Academy of Music with Ruth Nye and Hamish Milne, Chen appeared three times as soloist at London's Wigmore Hall, and performed at Italy's Fazioli Hall, Beijing's Forbidden City Concert Hall, Dublin's National Concert Hall, London's Cadogan Hall and Purcell Room, Singapore's Victoria Concert Hall and Kuala Lumpur's Dewan Petronas at the Twin Towers. Festival appearances include the South Bank Prokofiev Festival and Worcester Three Choirs Festival, São Paulo's Musica Nova Contemporary Music Festival and Sweden's Lidköping Music Festival.

He graduated from Royal Academy of Music in London with First Class Honours and winning eight awards including Best Final Recital, Best Overseas Pupil and Best Royal Overseas League.

== Recordings ==
Chen has made live broadcasts for Radio Television Hong Kong and Pianoforte Chicago (USA), and his six commercial recordings include two solo CDs for Jaques Samuel Recordings, a recording for the Cello Classics label with cellist Leonid Gorokhov, a solo piano disc for SOMM Recordings and piano trio recordings for Illuminate Records and Toccata Classics.
