= Igudesman & Joo =

Classical music duo

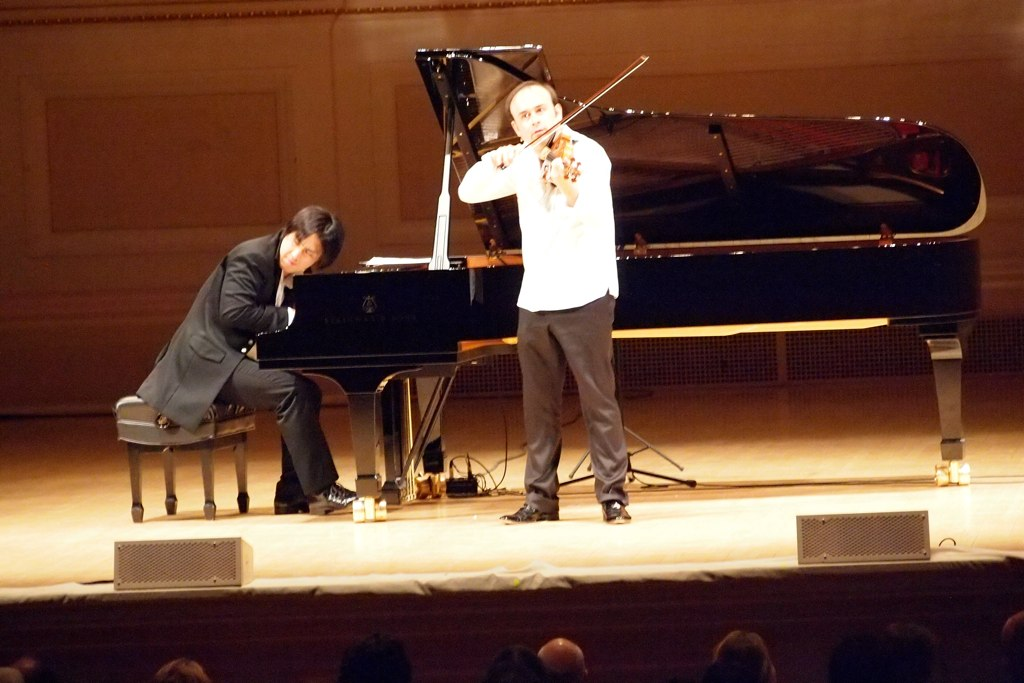
- Performing together in 2012, Carnegie Hall

Background information
- Genres: Classical
- Members: Aleksey Igudesman; Hyung-ki Joo
- Website: igudesmanandjoo.com

Igudesman & Joo is a duo comprising classical musicians Aleksey Igudesman and Hyung-ki Joo, whose shows combine comedy with classical music and popular culture.

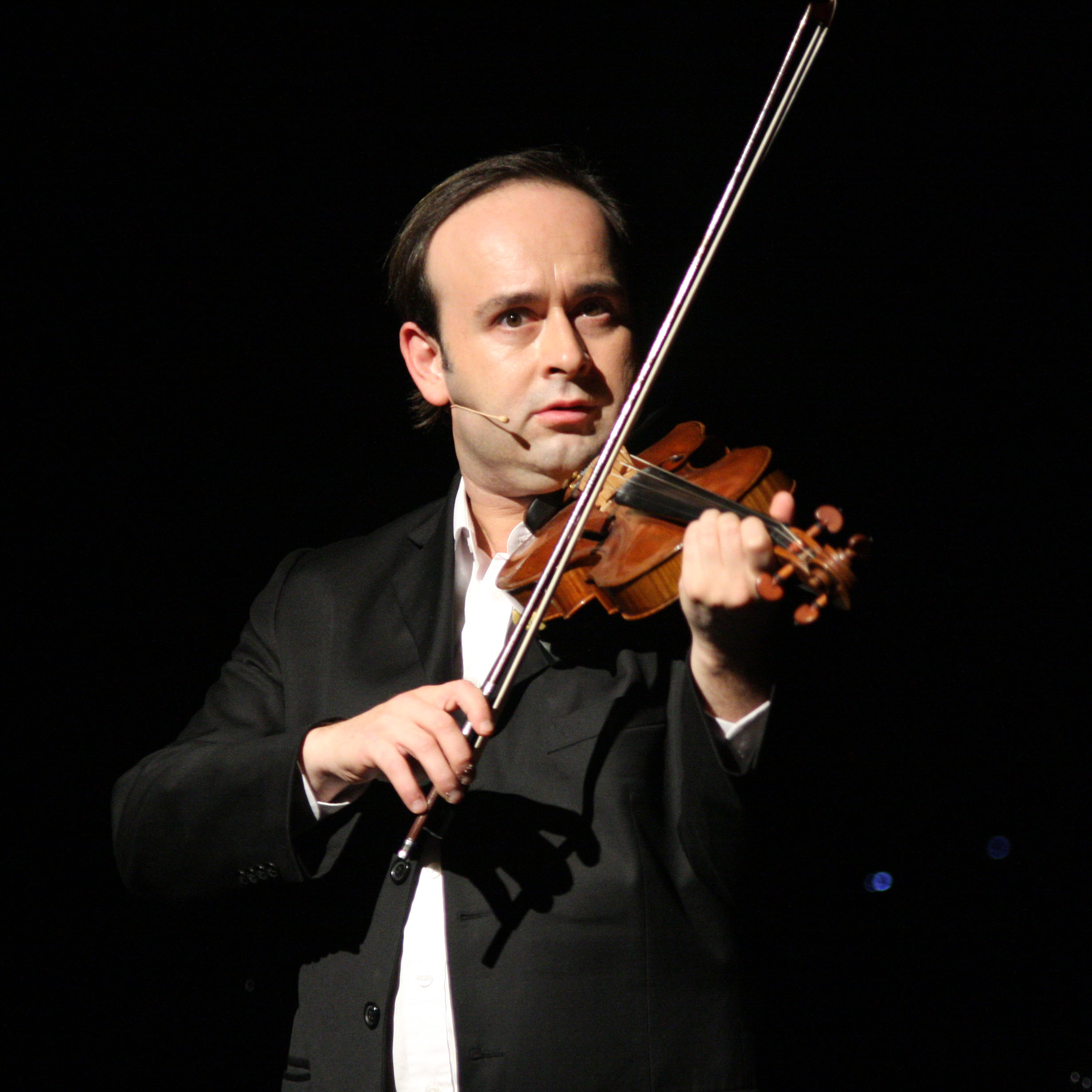
Aleksey Igudesman, 2009

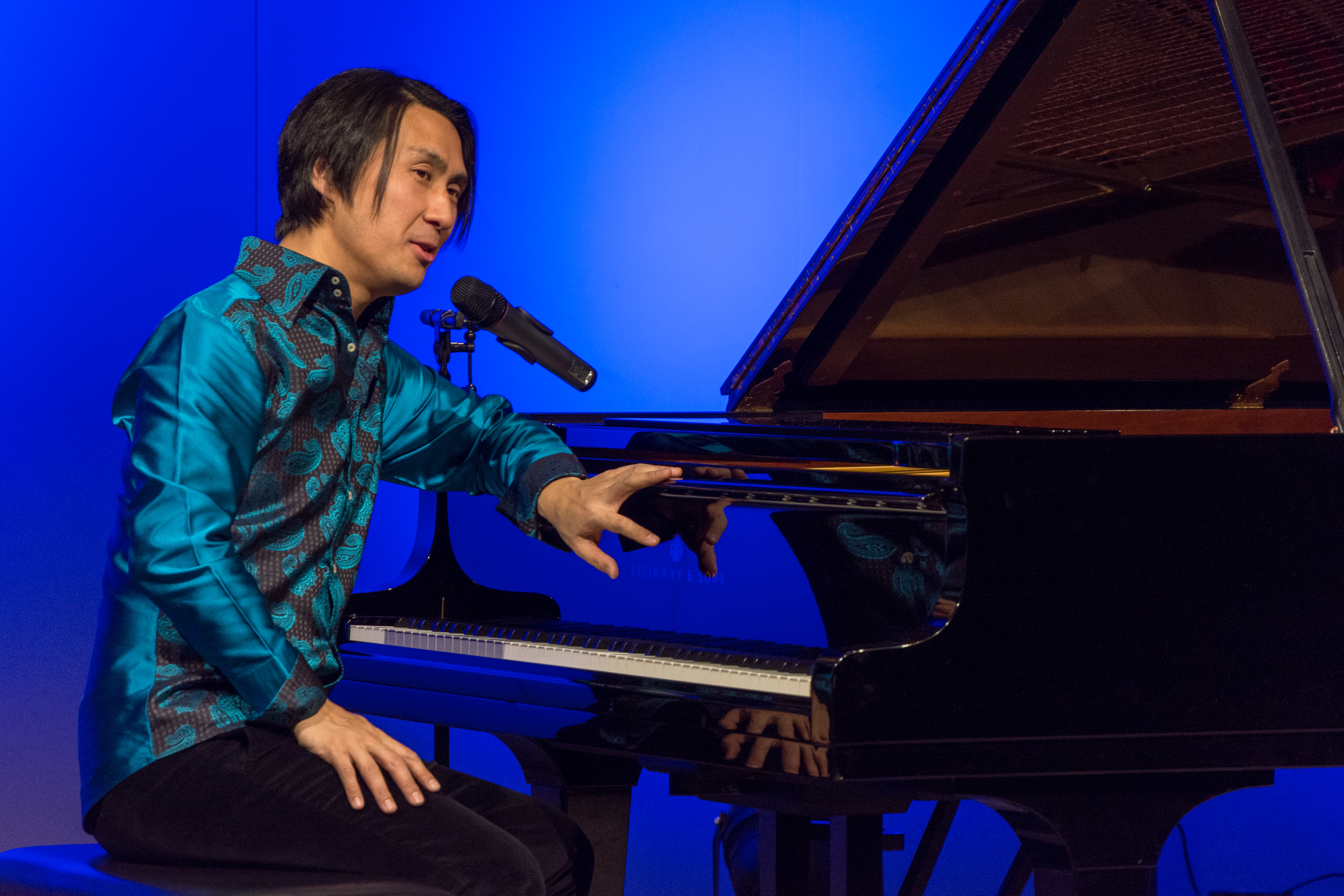
Hyung-ki Joo, 2017

== Beginning ==
Aleksey Igudesman and Hyung-ki Joo met at the age of twelve, at the Yehudi Menuhin School, in England, and since then, have remained friends and writing partners. Igudesman (born 22 February 1973) is a Russian violinist, composer, conductor and actor. Joo is a British-Korean pianist and composer. In 2004, inspired by Victor Borge and Dudley Moore, they created their show, "A Little Nightmare Music", a play on the Mozart string quartet Eine kleine Nachtmusik (English: A Little Night Music). Since then, they have performed with symphony orchestras and played at large festivals worldwide.

== Shows ==
Well known classical performers such as Emanuel Ax, Janine Jansen, Gidon Kremer, Mischa Maisky, Viktoria Mullova, and Julian Rachlin, have joined them in their musical sketches. Classical conductor Bernard Haitink commented "Igudesman and Joo played at my 80th birthday celebrations. I nearly died laughing. I'd like to invite them back for my 85th, but that might be considered reckless...Great musicians, great fun."

Their performances reach outside of the classical field. In 2008 they toured Europe with Robin Gibb (Bee Gees), Midge Ure (Ultravox), co-creator of Live Aid and Band Aid, Tears for Fears, Simple Minds, and Kim Wilde and Joe Kerr. Igudesman and Joo have also collaborated with the actor Roger Moore for UNICEF.

A Little Nightmare Music
"A Little Nightmare Music" has received positive reception. They have performed this show at Verbier Festival, Bergen International Festival, Yehudi Menuhin Festival in Gstaad, Lockenhaus, Saratoga Festival, New York and festivals run by Renaud Capuçon and Yuri Bashmet. The duo has received positive reviews from musicians and entertainers, including Terry Jones, Sir Roger Moore, violinist Gidon Kremer, violinist Julian Rachlin, and cellist Mischa Maisky.

BIG Nightmare Music
Igudesman & Joo also performed a show called "BIG Nightmare Music" with orchestras such as the Belgrade Symphony Orchestra, the Hong Kong Sinfonietta, and the Orchestre de Cannes Provence-Alpes-Côte d’Azur.

Being Gidon Kremer
Their project together with Gidon Kremer and Kremerata Baltica named "Being Gidon Kremer" premiered in 2008 and was performed in Schleswig Holstein and Rheingau Musik Festival as well as in Asia, Europe and Russia.

And Now Mozart
After the success of "A Little Nightmare Music", Igudesman & Joo developed a new show called "And Now Mozart". The show premiered at the Konzerthaus, Vienna, in September 2012 and has received positive critiques. Igudesman & Joo's second duo program was also played at the Bergen International Festival in June 2013, and at the Skirball Center for the Performing Arts in New York City in 2016.
