= Aubrey Murphy =

Irish violinist

Aubrey Murphy (28 May 1965 - 1 July 2025) was an Irish violinist. Murphy was Concertmaster of the Opera Australia (OA) orchestra in Sydney, Australia 2002 - 2012, and was Principal Violinist for the Royal Opera House Orchestra, London, United Kingdom for 8 years (1994–2002). More recently he was Concertmaster of the Cleveland Opera Theater and Opera Project Columbus.

== Background ==
Murphy was born in Dublin in 1965, Ireland and began playing piano and violin at the age of five. At age ten, he was the first Irish student ever to enter the Yehudi Menuhin School, where he studied with Felix Andrievsky, Peter Norris and Hans Keller. In 1983, he began his studies at Indiana University School of Music, under Franco Gulli, Henryk Kowalski, Josef Gingold and Rostislav Dubinsky.

== Career ==
Murphy has been guest leader with Scottish Chamber Orchestra and Ulster Orchestra. He then spent eight years with the Orchestra of the Royal Opera House, Covent Garden as Principal Violinist and regular Guest Concertmaster, working with conductors such as Georg Solti, Bernard Haitink, Sir Charles Mackerras and Colin Davis. In 2002, Murphy was appointed as Concertmaster for Opera Australia at the Sydney Opera House under the baton of Simone Young. In 1993, he was a founding member of the 'Soloists of the Royal Opera House', and in 2002 he founded the 'Utzon Ensemble' that played at the inaugural concert in the newly refurbished Utzon Room of the Sydney Opera House in addition to a series of chamber music concerts in Sydney from 2002 to 2008. In July 2013, Murphy resigned his post as Concertmaster of the Australian Opera and Ballet Orchestra.

== Recognition ==
- Artists Diploma and Performers Certificate (Bloomington)
- Centenary Medal for Services to Music in Australia.

== Discography ==
- Numerous recordings with Orchestra of the Royal Opera, Covent Garden and various artists
- The Love for Three Oranges (Prokoviev) and Rusalka (Dvorak) with Opera Australia (conducted by Richard Hickox on the Chandos label, and with The Australian Ballet under the baton of Nicolette Fraillon

== Instrument ==
Murphy owned a 1853 Giuseppe Rocca violin, acquired through Bein and Fushi in 2003.
