= Pierre-Laurent Aimard =

French pianist (born 1957)

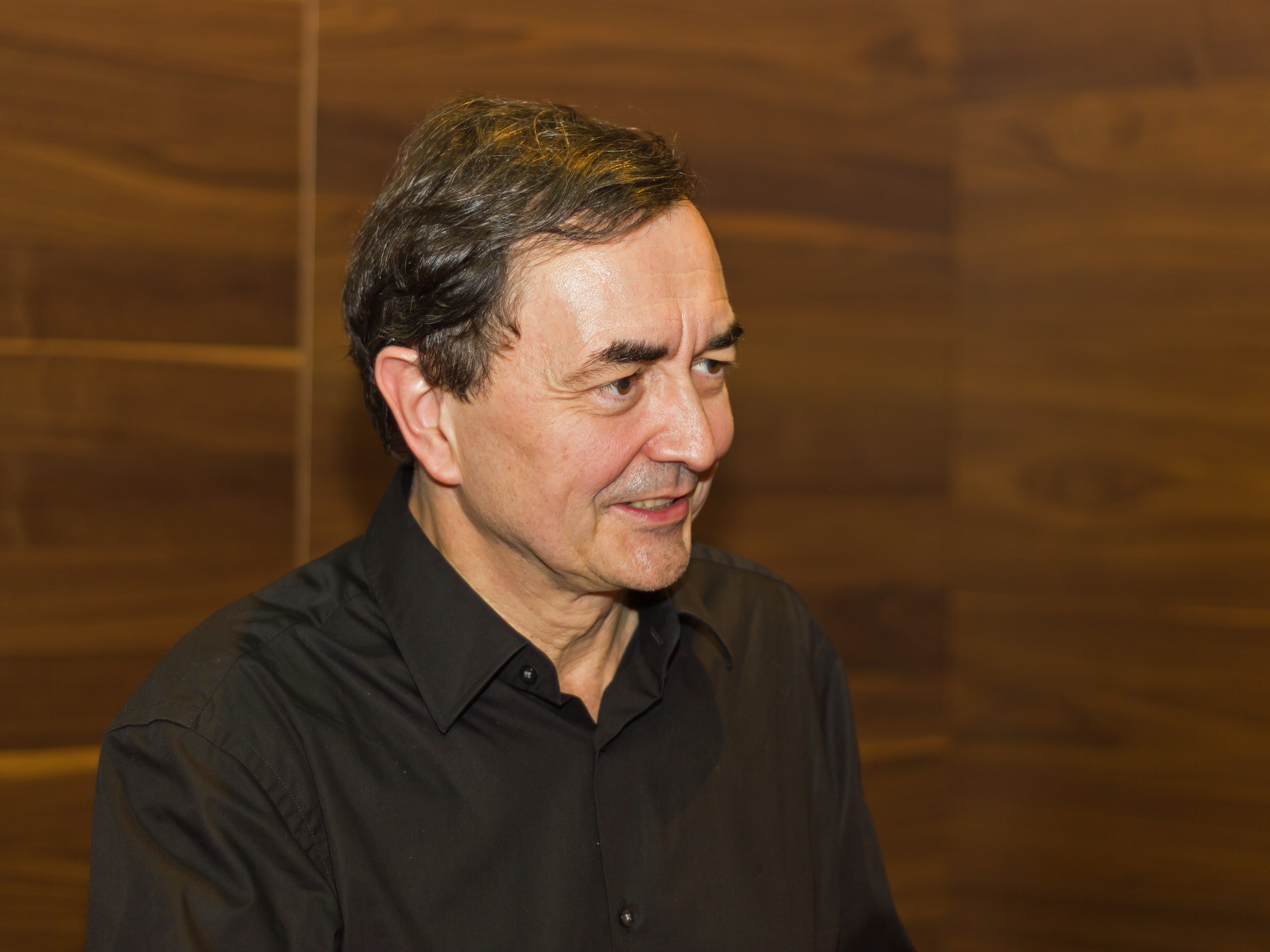
Aimard in Berlin 2014

Pierre-Laurent Aimard (born 9 September 1957) is a French pianist. He focuses on contemporary music.

== Biography ==
Aimard was born in Lyon, where he entered the conservatory. Later he studied with Yvonne Loriod and with Maria Curcio.

In 1973, he was awarded the chamber music prize of the Paris Conservatoire. In the same year, he won the first prize at the international Olivier Messiaen Competition. In 1977, at the invitation of Pierre Boulez, he became a founding member of the Ensemble InterContemporain. He made his American debut with the Chicago Symphony Orchestra at the age of twenty, performing the piano solo part in Olivier Messiaen's Turangalîla-Symphonie.

Aimard is particularly committed to contemporary music. He was the soloist in several premieres of works such as Répons by Pierre Boulez, Klavierstück XIV by Karlheinz Stockhausen, and the eleventh and thirteenth piano études of György Ligeti. One of his most notable recordings is that of the first two books of Ligeti's piano études. He has also performed the work of contemporary composers such as George Benjamin, Roberto Carnevale and Marco Stroppa. In May 2012, he premiered Tristan Murail's piano concerto Le Désenchantement du Monde.

Aimard was one of Carnegie Hall's "Perspectives" artists for the 2006–2007 concert season, where he programmed his own series of concerts. He served as artist-in-residence with the Cleveland Orchestra for two seasons, from 2007 to 2009. In 2007 Aimard was the music director of the Ojai Music Festival.

In addition to his work with contemporary music, Aimard has recorded the five Beethoven piano concertos with Nikolaus Harnoncourt and the Chamber Orchestra of Europe, at the invitation of Harnoncourt. Aimard has recorded for the Sony Classical and Teldec labels. In August 2007, he signed a new recording contract with Deutsche Grammophon.

Aimard has recently extended his musical activities to conducting, although he characterized his interest and gift for conducting as follows:

To be clear: I am not a conductor, and I will never be one. This is not my way of life, and I have nothing to do with that, and have no talent for that. But if you want me to give a definition to what I do, I wouldn't say I'm a pianist – I'm a musician, and the piano happens to be my instrument. I don't like to have one function, to give me just one perspective on music. I like to make chamber music, to be part of a group, to play song accompaniments, to teach, to speak about music. In other words, to live the phenomenon on different sides.

In 2009, Aimard became the artistic director of the Aldeburgh Festival in England, for an initial contract of 3 years. Aimard is a visiting professor and an Honorary Member (2006) of the Royal Academy of Music. He appears in the 2007 film Note by Note: The Making of Steinway L1037.

Aimard was featured recording Bach's The Art of Fugue in the 2009 award-winning German-Austrian documentary Pianomania, about Steinway & Sons' piano technician Stefan Knüpfer, which was directed by Lilian Franck and Robert Cibis. The film premiered theatrically in North America, where it was met with positive reviews by The New York Times, as well as in Asia and throughout Europe, and is a part of the Goethe-Institut catalogue.

In 2017 Aimard signed with the PENTATONE label. Under this collaboration Aimard intends to record key works from his repertoire, spanning three centuries and ranging from Bach to Kurtág, beginning with his first ever recording of Messiaen's Catalogue d'Oiseaux.

In 2024, Aimard premiered Mark Andre's ...selig ist... at the Donaueschingen Festival.

== Awards ==
- 2017 Ernst von Siemens Music Prize
- 2022 Léonie Sonning Music Prize

== Selected discography ==
- Aimard, Pierre-Laurent (2003), African rhythms (in German), Hamburg: Warner Strategic Marketing, OCLC 1183639694, compositions by György Ligeti and Steve Reich, with songs of Aka Pygmies.
- Messiaen, Olivier; Aimard, Pierre-Laurent (2018), Catalogue d'Oiseaux (in no linguistic content), JA Baarn, The Netherlands: PentaTone Music, OCLC 1031433507
- Aimard, Pierre-Laurent; Stefanovich, Tamara; Messiaen, Olivier; Enesco, Georges; Knussen, Oliver; Birtwistle, Harrison (2022), Visions (in no linguistic content), [Baarn]: PentaTone, OCLC 1352453966
- Bartók, Béla; Aimard, Pierre-Laurent; Salonen, Esa-Pekka; San Franciscos Symfoniorkester (2023), Piano concertos (in undetermined language), PentaTone Music, OCLC 1400969943
- Schubert, Franz; Aimard, Pierre-Laurent (2024), Ländler (in undetermined language), PentaTone Music, OCLC 1434111609
