= Hitomi Kaneko =

Japanese classical music composer (born 1965)

- Born: 2 November 1965; Japan Tokyo
- Other name: 金子 仁美
- Occupation: composer

Hitomi Kaneko (金子 仁美) is a female Japanese classical music composer.

== Background ==
Born in Japan in 1965, Ms. Kaneko graduated from the composition class at Toho Gakuen School of Music in 1988, and completed postgraduate studies in 1994. She went to study in France with a French Government scholarship in 1990. She then began to study at the Paris Conservatoire. She also attended the Summer Music Festivals in Avignon and Darmstadt with scholarships in 1992. In September 1997, she went to Paris to study at IRCAM. She is at present a full-time professor of Toho Gakuen School of Music.

== Awards and prizes ==
- First Prize in the 6th Competition of French-Japanese Contemporary Composition (1988)
- First Prize for Composition in the 59th Japan Music Competition (1990)
- E. Nakamichi Prize (1990)
- Awarded the 9th Muramatsu Prize (January 1997)

== Compositions ==
=== Orchestral works ===
- 悲しみの自乗 Tristesse (for orchestra)(1989)(First Prize and the E. Nakamichi Prize at the 59th Japan Music Competition, 1990): 8'
- ラ・ピエス La Piece (for 15 Players)(1993/94): 10'
- フルート協奏曲 Concerto (for Flute and Orchestra)(1995): 14'
- ル・プロセシュス Le Processus (for 15 Players)(1996): 15'
- 気配 尺八とオーケストラのための Kehai (for Shakuhachi and Orchestra)(1998): 24'39"
- グリゼイの墓 Le Tombeau de Gerard Grisey (for Chamber Orchestra)(2000): 20'
- 木島平讃歌 Hymn To Kijima-Daira (for Mixed Chorus and Orchestra)(2000): 4'45"
- 大好き木島平 Our Favorite Kijima-Daira (for children's chorus and Orchestra)(2000): 4'40"
- 祝典序曲《新しい生命（いのち）に》 Ouveture De Fete "Pour une nouvelle vie" (for Orchestra)(2001/02): 10'

=== Chamber works ===
- ヴァイオリン・ソナタ Sonata (for Violin and Piano)(1985): 17'
- 弦楽四重奏曲 String Quartet(1986): 16'30"
- ソナタ Sonata (for Flute, Violoncello and Piano)(1987): 14'
- 呼び声 Appel (for string quartet)(1988): 7'15"
- プロメテウス Promtheus (for Flute and Piano)(1988): 10'30"
- 雅 Miyabi(= elegance) (for two Flutes)(1991): 7'
- ある日ピアノと Un Jour Avec Le Piano (for Piano)(1992): 5'30"
- エスパス/レゾナンス Espace / Resonance (for Harp, Violin, Viola and Double bas)(1992): 10'15"
- 緑の光線 Rayon Vert (for Violin, Viola, Violoncello and Piano)(1993): 16'
- 遠心 Centrifuge (for Flute solo)(1994/96): 7'
- 幻影の空間 Espace / Vision (for Horn and Trumpet)(1996): 6'
- 捩じれた時 I Le Temps Tordu I (for Tom-tom and Marimba)(1996): 4'
- 呼吸（いき）I - a, b, c, d, e, f Respiration I - a, b, c, d, e, f (for Clarinet solo)(1996/98): a(1996): 1'30" / b(1998): 3' / c(1996): 3'30" / d(1996/97): 5'15" / e(1998): 1'30" / f(1998): 1'30"
- シェルターの中で Dans L'abri (for Piano)(1997): 10'
- 交叉 Le Croisement (for Oboe, Violin and Double bass)(1997): 24"
- 小鳥は飛び立とうとしている... Le Petit Oiseaux Va Sortir... (for Piccolo and Trombone)(1997): 6'
- クネヒト=ループレヒト Knecht Ruprecht (for Piano)(1997): 3'
- 磁界 Champ Magnetique (for String Quartet)(1997): 14'
- 空間/霧 Espace / Brume (for Marimba and Bass Clarinet)(1998): 7'
- 捩じれた時 III Le Temps Tordu III (for 2 Congas and 2 Bongos)(1998): 6'
- 連歌 I Renga I (for Shakuhachi, Violin and Harp)(1998): 17'
- 残響 La Reverberation (for Violin, Violoncello and Piano)(1998): 9'
- 連歌 II Renga II (for Flute, Clarinet, Percussion, Violin, Cello and Piano)(1999): 13'30"
- 呼吸（いき）II - 中断の継続 Respiration II - Continuation de l'interruption (for Flute and Violin)(1999): 11'
- フーガの方法 L'expression Methodique D'une Fugue (for Piano)(2000): 6'-7'30"
- アルプスの調べ Accord Des Alpes (for Piano)(2000/01): 3'
- 垂直の歌 Le Chant Vertical (for Shakuhachi and the Computer)(2000/01): 16'12"
- くじらのダンス Whale's Dance (for Piano)(2000): 4'
- 流線型の時 Le Temps Carene (for Oboe, Violin and Cello)(2000/01): ca.16'
- 捩じれた時 IV - 感覚の時間 Le Temps Tordu IV - le temps du sens (for Percussion)(2001): 8'50"
- M.Y.のための誕生日の歌 Anniversary Song For Y.M. (for Doublebass)(2001): 2'
- 捩じれた時 V Le Temps Tordu V (for Percussion)(2001): 5'
- 音の彫刻 La Sculpture Sur Les Sons (for Marimba)(2001): 7'38"
- 気泡 La Bulle (for Alto Saxophone and Piano)(2001): 9'30"
- 軽井沢の午後 Afternoon in Karuizawa (for Piano)(2001): 3'
- 二人静 Futari Shizuka, une recitation des vers du No (for Yo(voice), Nokan, Shooko, flute and Percussion)(2001/02): 18'40"
- 流れ The Stream (for Strings)(2002): 5'
- アリラン変奏曲 Variations Sur Un Theme D'arirang (for Piano)(2002): 5'20"
- うた うた うた Song, Song, Song (for Piano)(2002): 3'
- 呼吸（いき） III ?孤独の共存 Respiration III - Coexistence des isolements (for Oboe, Clarinet and Bassoon)(2002): 12'35"
- 小さな星 La Petite Etoile (for children's chorus and guitar)(2003): ca.3'

=== Other works ===
- エチュード I Etude I (for Tape)(1991): 3'
- エチュード II Etude II (for Tape)(1992): 12'
- 捩じれた時 II Le Temps Tordu II (for Miburi and Three Dancers)(1997): 8'
- 分解 I：導入 Decomposition I - Introduction (for Computer)(1998): 3'
- 分解 II：ゲートの向こうで Decomposition II - Beyond the gate (for Computer)(1999): 6'
- シェルターの中で Dans L'abri (Revised Version for Piano and Computer)(1997/2002): 14'56"

=== Writings ===
- 「方法の表現」まで/から Up to and/or From 'Expressive Method' (2001)

Published in Quarterly magazine "ExMusica" Vol.3, March 2001

- わが作曲技法とコンピュータとの関係 On the relationship between My Compositional Method and the Computer (2002)

Read at the 17th Congress of the International Association of
Empirical Aesthetics(IAEA), on 5 August 2002, in Takarasuka.

== Discography ==
=== Orchestra ===
- Concerto (for flute and orchestra)(1995) DEUTSCHE GRAMMOPHON/POCG-1947
- Kehai (for shakuhachi and orchestra)(1998) GREEN CONCERTS/OCD-98113-1

=== Chamber music ===
- Miyabi (for two flutes)(1991) RUGGINENTI EDITORE/RUSSY CLASSICA/RUS-555019. 2DDD
- L'expression methodique d'une fugue (for piano)(2000) ZEN-ON/ZP-2000
