= Toho Gakuen School of Music =

Private music school in Chōfu, Tokyo, Japan

Coordinates: 35°39′35.59″N 139°35′00.91″E

- 桐朋学園大学
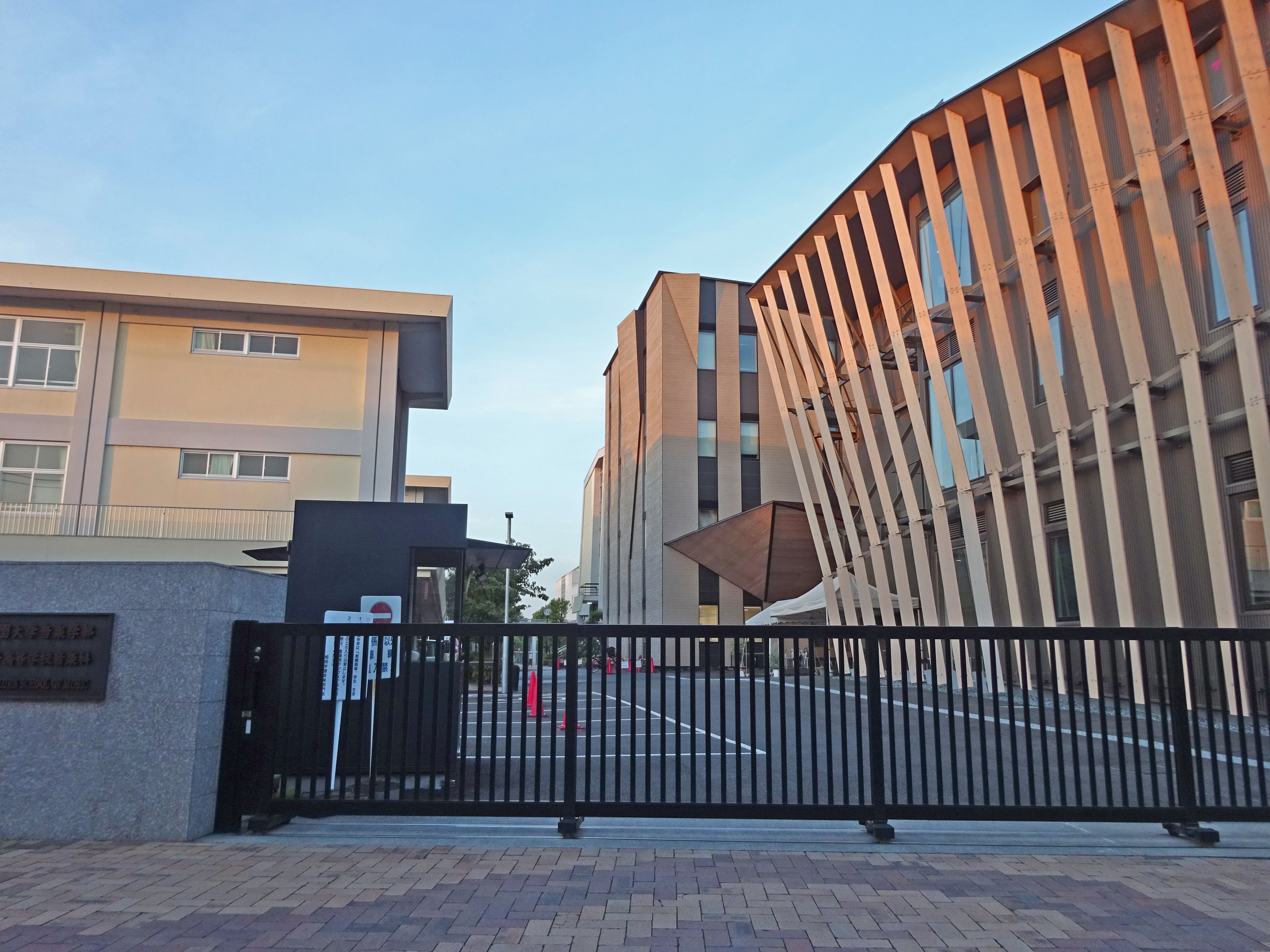
- Type: Private
- Established: 1948
- President: Tsuyoshi Tsutsumi
- Principal: Ikuo Oshima
- Location: Chōfu, Tokyo, Japan
- Campus: Urban
- Website: www.tohomusic.ac.jp

Toho Gakuen School of Music (桐朋学園大学, Tōhō Gakuen Daigaku) is a private music school in Chōfu, Tokyo, Japan.

== History ==
Toho Gakuen was founded in 1948 in Ichigaya (Tokyo) as the Music School for Children, and two years later moved to Sengawa (current address at Wakabacyo, Chōfu-shi, Tokyo) and opened the Toho High School of Music, to provide quality musical education to teenage girls. Nov.1954 moved to Sengawa (Wakabacyo, Chōfu-shi, Tokyo). 1955 saw the establishment of the Junior College and in 1961 the Junior College becomes the Toho Gakuen College Music Department. The College of Music was a pioneer in offering university-level degrees in music in Japan. In 1995 the Toho Orchestra Academy was established in Toyama and in 1999 opened the Toho Gakuen Graduate School, which offers postgraduate degrees.

== Courses ==
Through its high school, college and graduate school, Toho Gakuen offers courses from preparatory diplomas to master's degrees in all orchestral instruments, piano, composition, conducting and musicology.

== Notable staff members ==
- Hiroshi Wakasugi, conductor
- Hitomi Kaneko, composer

== Notable alumni ==
- Seiji Ozawa, conductor
- Kazuyoshi Akiyama, conductor,
- Tadaaki Otaka, conductor
- Hiroko Nakamura, pianist
- Tōru Yasunaga, violinist
- Koichiro Harada, founding member of the Tokyo String Quartet
- Sadao Harada, founding member of the Tokyo String Quartet
- Kazuhide Isomura, founding member of the Tokyo String Quartet
- Yoshiko Nakura, founding member of the Tokyo String Quartet
- Akiko Suwanai, violinist
- Nobuko Imai, violist
- Mayuko Kamio, violinist
- František Brikcius, cellist
- David Currie, conductor
- Aimi Kobayashi, pianist
- Kokia, singer, composer
- Yukie Nishimura, pianist
- Yoko Nozaki, pianist
- Eiji Oue, conductor.
- Heiichiro Ohyama, conductor
- Yūji Takahashi, composer, arranger, and pianist
- Tsuyoshi Tsutsumi, cellist and later President of Toho Gakuen School of Music
- Keiko Abe, marimbist, composer, educator
