= Music Traveler =

Peer-to-peer sharing economy platform

- Founded: 2017
- Headquarters: Austria

Music Traveler is a peer-to-peer sharing economy platform specialised in the centralisation of venues and spaces for members of the creative sector. This is achieved through the rental of music studios, practice rooms and recital spaces. However, other services are also provided including the rental of concert halls, live music venues, rooms for music lessons, festival locations, outdoor music venues, theatres, and the company is involved in collaborations with the educational sector. The company was founded in Vienna, Austria in 2017 by Aleksey Igudesman and Julia Rhee. The Music Traveler mobile application has been available for use since 2018. Co-founders Igudesman and Rhee are both recognised musicians.

The service is intended for use by professional musicians on concert tours and amateur musicians who want to practice and has gained the backing of prominent supporters such as John Malkovich, Billy Joel and Hans Zimmer. The latter are also members of Music Traveler's advisory board that also includes pianist Emmanuel Ax, pianist Yuja Wang, and director of the Vienna Philharmonic Clemens Hellsberg. Steinway Austria is one of the company's partners.

In 2017, Music Traveler was chosen by the Vienna Business Agency to represent the Austrian startup scene on the SXSW festival in Austin, Texas.

At the start of 2020, a partnership was announced between Music Traveler and FanDragon Technologies, a platform that specialises in online ticketing, who announced their plan to integrate their SaaS technology into Music Traveler's mobile app through SDK integration.

On 24 March 2020, the Music Traveler team appeared on the seventh season of the German investment television show Die Höhle der Löwen.
