= Regina Smendzianka =

Polish pianist

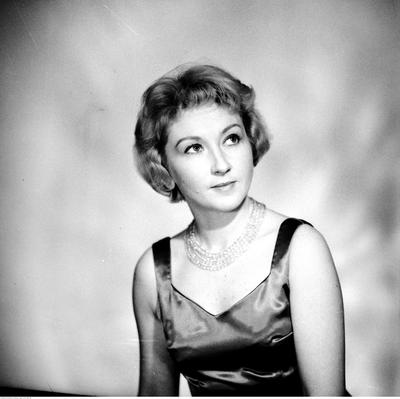

Regina Smendzianka (9 October 1924, Toruń – 15 September 2011, Warsaw) was a Polish pianist.

== Biography ==
Regina Smendzianka was born in Toruń, and began her public performances as a child of eight surprising the audience with her mature interpretation of the classical works. In 1949 she was awarded the just resumed IV International Chopin Piano Competition's 11th prize soon after graduating from the State Higher School of Music in Kraków (at present Academy of Music in Kraków) with the highest marks. She was a disciple of Zbigniew Drzewiecki from 1950 to 1955, and subsequently launched an international career. Smendzianka held a professorship at the Fryderyk Chopin Music Academy in Warsaw (at present Fryderyk Chopin University of Music in Warsaw) until 1996, briefly serving as the institution's rector. Among her students are contemporary classical pianists such as: Andrzej Dutkiewicz, Elżbieta Karaś-Krasztel, Maria Korecka, Ewa Kupiec, Elżbieta Tarnawska, Sławomir Dobrzański, Maciej Grzybowski, Nina Drath, Jesús María Figueroa, Rosa María Delsordo, Kazimierz Brzozowski, Moto Harada, Artur Cieślak, Yumi Toyama. Smendzianka was a juror at the 1970, 1980, 1995 and 2000 editions of the Chopin Competition.
