= Till Fellner =

Austrian pianist (born 1972)

Till Fellner (born 9 March 1972) is an Austrian pianist.

== Biography ==
Till Fellner was born in Vienna and studied at the Konservatorium der Stadt Wien with Helene Sedo-Stadler, and subsequently with Alfred Brendel, Meira Farkas, Oleg Maisenberg and Claus-Christian Schuster. He won first prize in the Clara Haskil International Piano Competition in Vevey, Switzerland in 1993, and was awarded the Mozartinterpretationspreis of the Mozart Society of Vienna in 1998.

Fellner has played with orchestras such as the Berlin Philharmonic, Vienna Philharmonic, Royal Concertgebouw Orchestra, New York Philharmonic, Boston Symphony Orchestra, Chicago Symphony Orchestra, and NHK Symphony Orchestra. He has worked with Claudio Abbado, Vladimir Ashkenazy, Herbert Blomstedt, Semyon Bychkov, Christoph von Dohnányi, Christoph Eschenbach, Bernard Haitink, Nikolaus Harnoncourt, Manfred Honeck, Sir Charles Mackerras, Sir Neville Marriner, Kurt Masur, Kent Nagano, Jonathan Nott, Kirill Petrenko, and Hans Zender.

He has performed at the BBC Proms London, Festival de la Roque d' Anthéron, Hollywood Bowl Los Angeles, Klavier-Festival Ruhr, Lucerne Festival, Mostly Mozart Festival New York, Salzburg Festival, Schubertiade Schwarzenberg, Tanglewood Music Festival, and Vienna Festival.

An active chamber musician, Fellner regularly collaborates with the Belcea Quartet, tenor Mark Padmore, violinist Viviane Hagner and cellist Adrian Brendel.

Fellner has received critical acclaim for his performances of the masterworks of the baroque, classical, and romantic periods, particularly compositions by J.S. Bach, Mozart, Beethoven, Schubert, and Liszt. He performs musical rarities such as the piano sonata of Julius Reubke, which was composed in Weimar under the aegis of Liszt. Fellner also performs music of the Second Viennese School of Arnold Schoenberg, Alban Berg and Anton Webern, as well as the contemporary classical music of Heinz Holliger, György Kurtág, Thomas Larcher, and Harrison Birtwistle, including some premieres.

In 2008–2010, Fellner performed Beethoven's 32 piano sonatas in a seven-recital series in Vienna, Paris, London, New York City, and Tokyo. He also performed and recorded Beethoven's Piano Concertos Nos. 4 and 5 with the Montreal Symphony under the baton of Kent Nagano.

In 2009, Fellner was featured in the award-winning German-Austrian documentary Pianomania.

He has taught at the Zurich University of the Arts since 2013 and joined the faculty of the University of Music and Performing Arts Graz in 2023. His former students include Aurel Dawidiuk, Anton Gerzenberg, Mitra Kotte und Carter Muller.

In 2016, his recording of the piano quintet by J. Brahms with the Belcea Quartet received the "Diapason d'Or de l'Année".

Fellner is a jury member at major international competitions, including The Cliburn (2025), the Leeds International Piano Competition (2024), and the Concours de Genève (2022). In 2019, he chaired the jury of the Ferruccio Busoni International Piano Competition in Bolzano.

== Recordings ==
- Schubert: 4 Impromptus, D 935, Op. posth. 142; Arnold Schoenberg: Suite, Op. 25; Beethoven: Sonata No. 23 in F minor, Op. 57 'Appassionata'. EMI Austria, 567 7 54497 2 (1992)
- Mozart: Piano Concerto No. 22 in E flat major, K 482 (Orchestre de Chambre de Lausanne/Uri Segal); Mozart: Rondo in A minor, K 511; Beethoven: Sonata No. 5 in C minor, Op. 10 No. 1. Claves, CD 50-9328 (1994)
- Beethoven: Piano Concerto No. 2 in B flat major, Op. 19; Beethoven: Piano Concerto No. 3 in C minor, Op. 37 (The Academy of St. Martin in the Fields/Sir Neville Marriner). Erato, 4509-98539-2 (1995)
- Schumann: Kreisleriana, Op. 16; Julius Reubke: Sonata in B-flat minor. Erato, 0630-12710-2 (1996)
- Schubert: Sonata in A minor, D 784, Op. posth. 143; Schubert: 6 Moments musicaux, D 780, Op. 94; Schubert: 12 Grazer Walzer, D 924, Op. 91. Erato, 0630-17869-2 (1997)
- Mozart: Piano Concerto No. 19 in F major, K 459; Mozart: Piano Concerto No. 25 in C major, K 503 (Camerata Academica Salzburg/Alexander Janiczek). Erato, 3984-23299-2 (1998)
- Beethoven: The Complete Works for Cello and Piano (Heinrich Schiff, cello). Philips, 462 601-2 (2000)
- J. S. Bach: The Well-Tempered Clavier, Book I, BWV 846–869. ECM New Series, 1853/54 (2004)
- J. S. Bach: Inventions & Sinfonias, French Suite No. V. ECM New Series, 2043 (2009)
- Beethoven: Piano Concerto No. 4 in G major, Op. 58; Piano Concerto No. 5 in E-flat major, Op. 73 (Orchestre symphonique de Montréal/Kent Nagano). ECM New Series, 2114 (2010)
- Thomas Larcher: Böse Zellen for piano and orchestra (Münchener Kammerorchester/Dennis Russell Davies). ECM New Series, 2111 (2010)
- Harrison Birtwistle: Chamber Music (Lisa Batiashvili, Adrian Brendel, Roderick Williams). ECM New Series, 2253 (2014)
- J. Brahms: Piano Quintet in F minor, Op. 34 (Belcea Quartet). Alpha, 248 (2016)
- F. Liszt: Années de pèlerinage, Première année – Suisse; Beethoven: Piano Sonata No. 32 in C minor, Op. 111. ECM New Series, 2511 (2018)
