= Ruth Nye =

Australian musician

Ruth Nye MBE (born 1932) is an Australian pianist and teacher, based in the United Kingdom.

Ruth Nye, born Ruth Farren-Price, sister of fellow pianist Ronald Farren-Price, grew up in Australia where she attended Methodist Ladies' College in Melbourne.

== Career ==
Nye studied with Claudio Arrau in New York, and had a career as a concert pianist, initially known by her maiden name Ruth Farren-Price, before turning her attention to teaching. She married fellow Australian Ross Nye in 1956.

Ruth Nye is currently on the faculty of the Yehudi Menuhin School in Surrey, UK and the Royal College of Music in London, UK. She holds master classes and lectures throughout the world.

== Honours ==
Ruth Nye was appointed a Member of the Order of the British Empire (MBE) in the 2007 Queen's Birthday Honours list. In 2008 a Fellowship of the Royal College of Music was conferred on her by the Prince of Wales. She lives near London.

A biography of Ruth Nye, titled A Life in Music: Ruth Nye and the Arrau Heritage, has been written by Roma Randles.
