= Yukie Nishimura =

Japanese musician

Yukie Nishimura (西村 由紀江, Nishimura Yukie; born May 8, 1967 in Toyonaka, Osaka) is a prolific Japanese pianist and composer. Hailed as a musician of "New Age Music", her piano style is light easy listening and her works are sometimes heard on television in Japan, even with her appearance in television commercials and fashion magazines thanks to her stunning looks. She has a following in Hong Kong, China and Singapore.

In her performances, she usually changes her clothing according to the music she performs and keeps the stage presentation to "a bare minimum".

Her hobbies are enjoying herbal teas, fragrant baths and swimming.

== History ==
Nishimura began playing the piano at age 4 with Yamaha, being inspired by her mother.

At age 8, she began touring to Europe, the United States, Taiwan and Thailand. During her teenage years, she performed with the NHK Philharmonic Orchestra, the Osaka Philharmonic Orchestra and the Washington National Orchestra She later studied at the Toho Gakuen School of Music and was selected to perform at a recital with then-Crown Prince Naruhito. A few years later, she would also have a piano duet with Naruhito.

In 1986, she released her first album, Angelique.

In 1991, Nishimura composed six pieces for the drama series 101 Proposals, including a piano solo of the theme song Say Yes, originally written and performed by Chage & Aska. Also in 1991, she performed at the Bratislava Lyre Festival in Czechoslovakia and awarded the Slovakia Radio Special Award for most musical performance.

One of her 1991 albums, Vi Ji N, is about the "myriad things in life which people find appealing".

In 1996, she released her newest album, Virgin, which described her feelings after 10 years of performing. The album sold over 10,000 copies in Singapore. Later, she released her next album, Blue Virgin, inspired by her interest in Chinese pop since 1991, are rearrangements of songs by Asian artists such as Chan, Faye Wong and Jacky Cheung with the only original piece in the album being the title track.

== Discography ==
- Angelique (1986)
- Lyrisme (1987)
- Dolce (1988)
- Fascination (1988)
- Lumiere ～地図のない季節～ (1989) : playin' around with no map and plot
- L'espoir ～レスポワール～ (1989)
- 風色の夢 (1990) : (Wind's Rain)
- Vi・Ji・N (1991): sophisticated girl
- 101回目のプロポーズ (1991) : ("101 Proposal")
- MOON (1992)
- 親愛なる者へ (1992)
- SUPER BEST (1992)
- プロポーズ ～Propose～ (1992)
- graceful (1993)
- GOOD MORNING ～グッドモーニング～ (1994)
- Memories (Released in Hong Kong only) (1995)
- 時の輝き (1995)
- Virgin (1995)
- Blue Horizon (1996)
- 月いろのつばさ (1997)
- 大地のうた (1998)
- BALLISTIC KISS (1998)
- 自分への手紙 (1999)
- 風が生まれる瞬間 (2000)
- 優しさの意味 (2001)
- しあわせまでもう少し (2002)
- 明日のために (2002)
- 扉をあけよう (2003)
- 君が想い出になる前に (2004)
- しあわせのかたち (2004)
- 耳をすまして (2005)
- Best of Best ～20 Songs～ (2006)
- あなたが輝くとき (2007)
- Vitamin (2009)
- Piano (2010)
- Smile Best ～selfcover collection～ (2011/7)
- Beautiful Morning (2011/7) (yccs10049)
- Bedtime Music (2011/7) (yccs10050)
- フレデリック・バック meets 西村由紀江 (2012)
- ビオトープ (2013)
