= Moto Harada =

Japanese pianist and composer

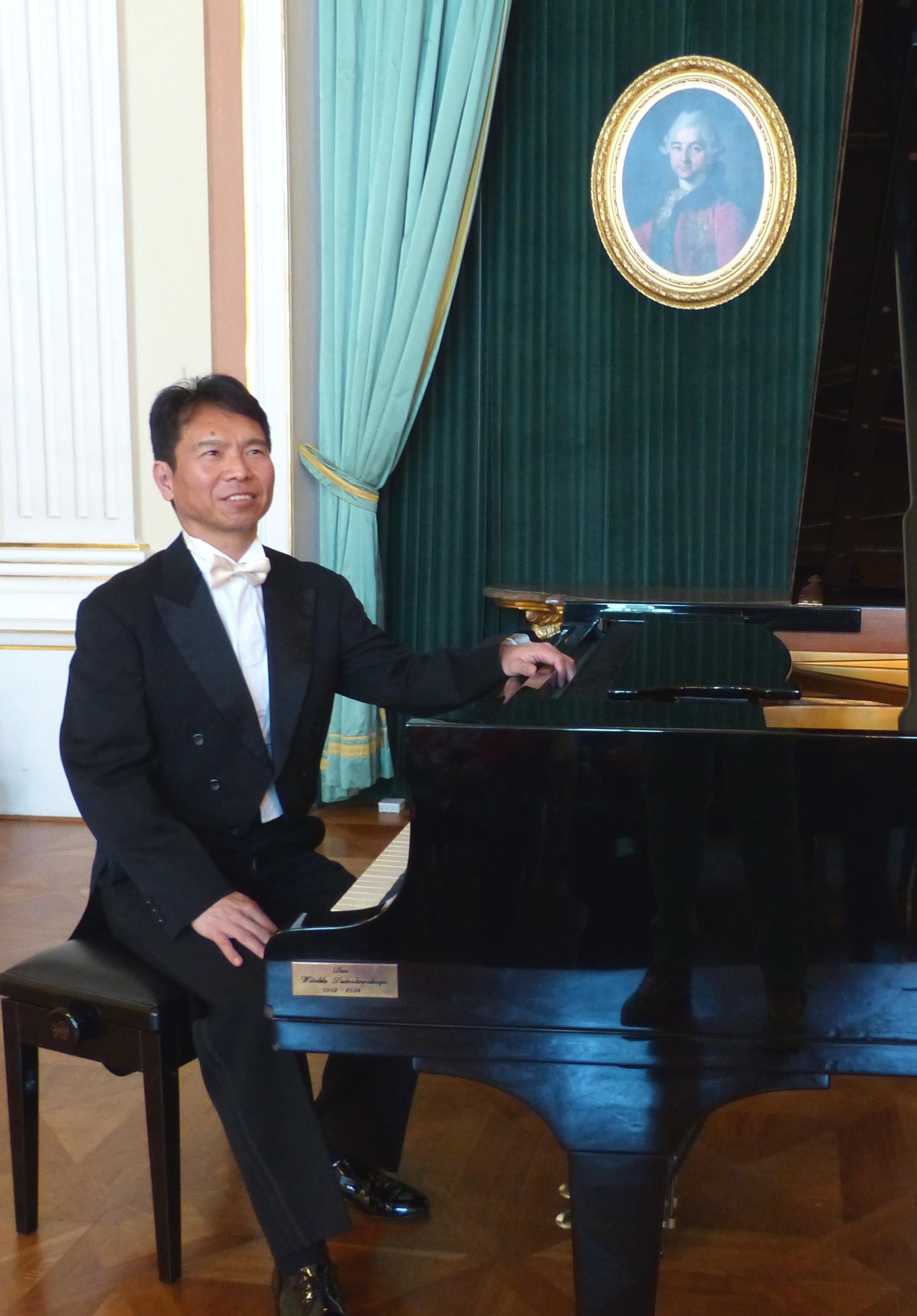
Moto Harada, Royal Castle in Warsaw (2013)

Mototsugu Harada (原田 資嗣, Harada Mototsugu; born 1957 in Shimonoseki) is a Japanese concert pianist and composer.

== Biography ==
Moto Harada has played the piano since the age of three. He studied music and music pedagogics at the Tokyo University of the Arts. In 1980, Harada was taught at the University of Music and Performing Arts Vienna by Hermann Schwertmann and then took lessons from Jacob Lateiner at the Juilliard School in New York in 1982. One year later, he received a stipend from the Polish government and started studying at the Fryderyk Chopin University of Music for two years under the supervision of Regina Smendzianka. During this period, Harada played at a variety of concerts and performed on radio and television. A stipend from Rotary International led him to the Hanover University of Music, Drama and Media where he successfully completed the concert examination by Karl-Heinz Kämmerling. Since 1988, Harada has been a piano teacher at the University of Hildesheim and has been invited by Chinese universities to give lessons several times.

== Concert activity ==
Parallel to his teaching responsibilities, Moto Harada also works as a concert pianist. His repertoire is centred on classical and romantic music (Beethoven, Mozart, Chopin, etc.), but also includes a wide range of virtuosic pieces (Ravel, Debussy, Gershwin, etc.). Additionally, Harada is very familiar with modern music for the piano, having played the premieres of compositions from Witold Szalonek, Gyu-Bong Yi and others. His concert activities have also led him abroad and to several other European countries. Since 2000, Harada has been a regular performer at the music festival of Seelze.

== Compositions ==
Harada's compositions combine classical elements of European and Asian music with innovative techniques used in modern music. Most of his pieces are based on a musical theme or utilize motives to create a specific atmosphere via means used in program music. This allows the audience to emotionally connect to the music and helps them understand the expressed mood. His compositions mainly consist of music for solo pianists in varying degrees of difficulty, but also include chamber music and pieces for singers. On November 6, 2016, his piano concert premiered in the St. Michael church in Hildesheim.

Harada's compositions are published by Olms Weidmann. A collection of compositions for starting pianists titled "Album der Insel Spiekeroog" is available for free online. Further compositions include:

- Tiere aus Galapagos / Animals from Galapagos. 9 compositions for the piano.
- Morgensonnenlicht / Light of the morning sun. Four haiku songs for soprano and the piano with lyrics from Martin Schreiner.
- Bilder von Vincent van Gogh / Pictures by Vincent van Gogh. Four compositions for the piano.
- Zwölf Traumgeschichten für Klavier / Twelve Dream Stories for Piano. Illustrated by Moritz Götze.
