= Lilian Franck =

German film director and producer

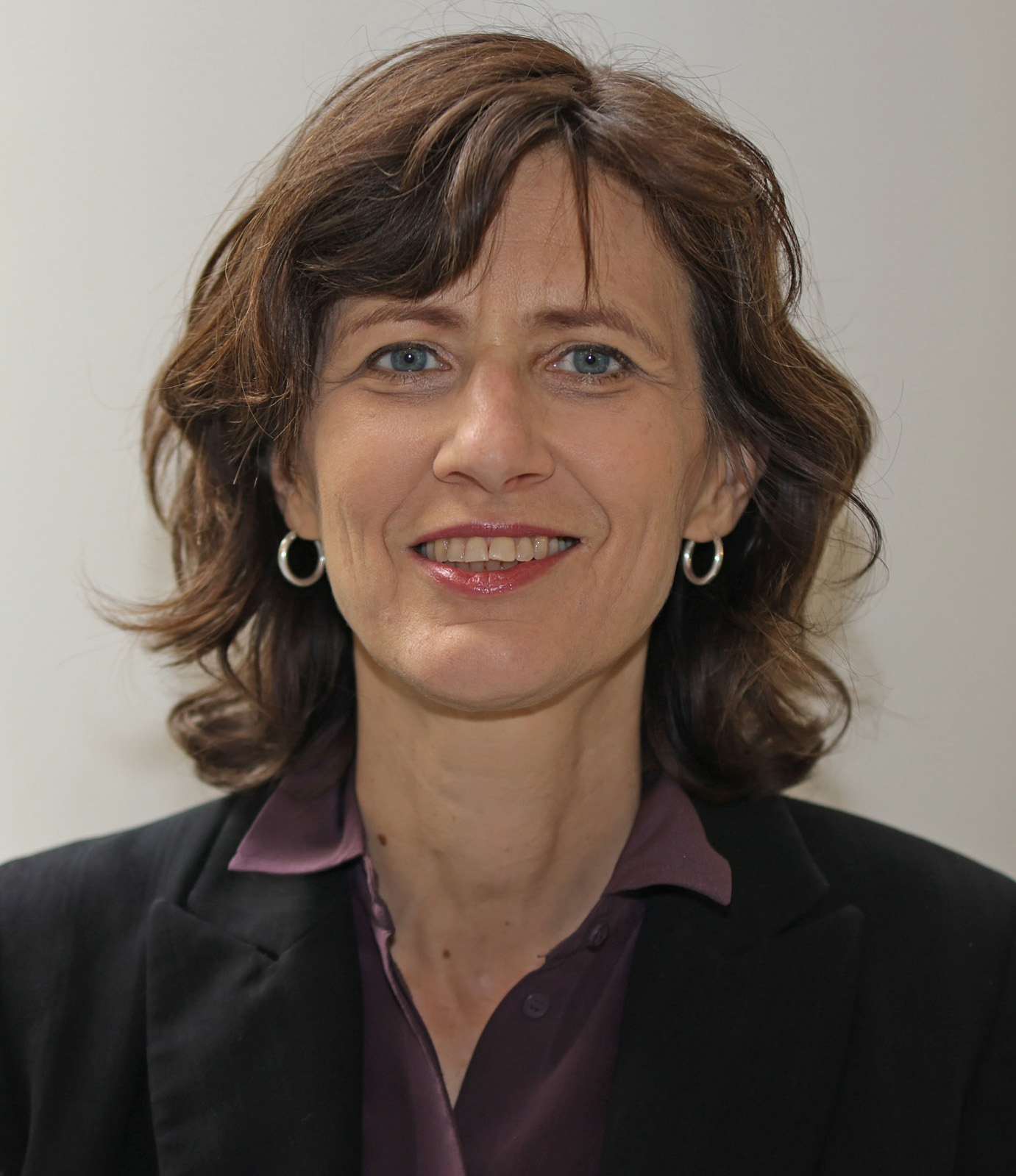
Franck in 2022

Lilian Franck (born March 11, 1971) is a German film director and producer, best known for her 2010 documentary Pianomania, a collaborative work with filmmaker Robert Cibis and winner of the Golden Gate Award for Best Documentary at the San Francisco International Film Festival, the German Film Award for Best Sound Design in 2011 and the Semaine De La Critique prize at the Locarno International Film Festival.

== Education ==
Franck was born on March 11, 1971, in Würzberg, Germany. She studied at the Filmakademie Baden-Württemberg and at Le Fresnoy - Studio National des Arts Contemporains in France.

== Career ==
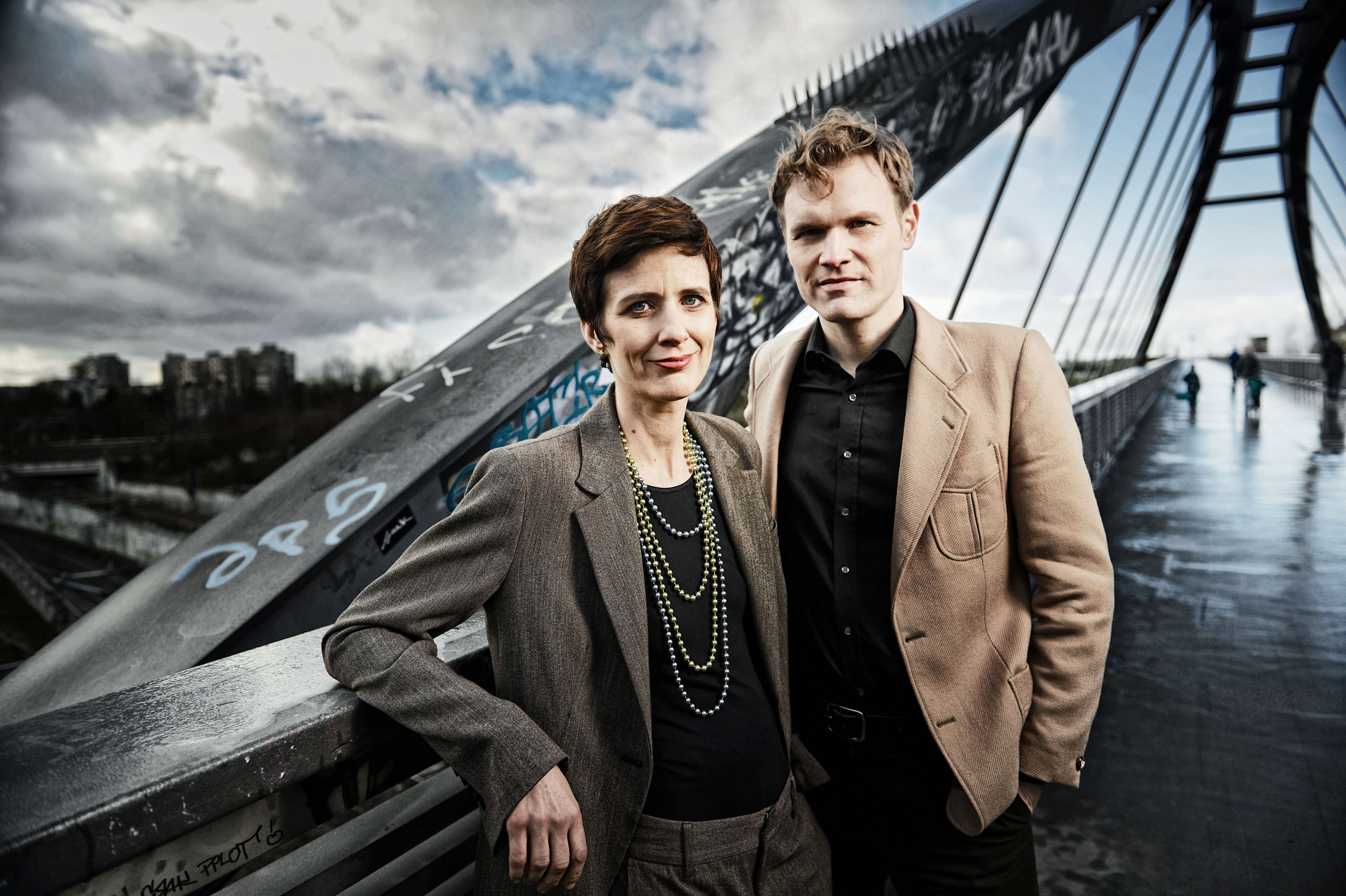
Lilian Franck with Robert Cibis

In 2002, she received the German–French Journalist Award (de) for her documentary Half A Chance? (2002), her first with co-director and collaborator Robert Cibis. Franck and Cibis co-founded OVALmedia. Their first project producing and directing together was Human Capital - The Employment Trade (2007). Later in 2007, their project Disgustingly Healthy, an exposé on the use of leeches and maggots in Western medicine, was awarded the Ektopfilm Award. Their 2009 documentary film Pianomania depicts the collaboration between piano technician Stefan Knüper and pianists including Pierre-Laurent Aimard, Alfred Brendel and Lang Lang; it had a successful theatrical release and was screened in theatres in over 25 countries worldwide, as well as over 100 countries on television. Pianomania was awarded the Semaine De La Critique prize at the Locarno International Film Festival, the Golden Gate award at the San Francisco International Film Festival and the German Film Award for Best Sound Design.

In 2016, Franck and Cibis produced and distributed Free Lunch Society (directed by Christian Tod), which opened in 100 German cinemas and venues in February in a large-scale crowdsourced premiere event, whereby members of the public were invited to receive copies of the film to hold their own public screenings. This was coordinated by Franck in association with Mein Grundeinkommen.

In February 2018, Franck's film trustWHO, a report on the influence of privatised industry on the World Health Organisation, was released in German cinemas nationwide. An additional project, a co-production and co-direction between Franck and Cibis, Fuck Fame, a biopic of the indie-rap musician, Uffie, was released in June 2019.

== Filmography ==
=== Feature films ===
- Pianomania (2009)
- Free Lunch Society (Co-producer & Distributor) (2016)
- trustWHO (2018)
- Fuck Fame (2018)

=== Short films ===
- Omen - 15 Hours of Techno (1994)
- Clemi Escapes (1994)
- Supermerle (1997)
- Cora (2000)
- I Love Me, I Love Me Not (Producer) (2003)
- Anyway Home (Producer) (2015)
- J'ai Tout Donné Au Soleil Sauf Mon Ombre (Producer) (2015)

=== Video installation ===
- Spin The World (2000)

=== Television ===
- Half A Chance? (2003)
- Human Capital - The Employment Trade (2007)
- Disgustingly Healthy (Producer) (2009)
- Preying On Patients (Producer) (2009)
- The Pill: Atom Bomb of Contraception (Producer) (2010)
- Kids On Pills (2010)
- Virus vs. Bacteria - A Way Out Of The Antibiotics Crisis (Producer) (2011)

== Awards ==
Film		Date Of Ceremony	Award	Category
Pianomania (2009)	Deutscher Filmpreis	2011	German Film Award	Best Sound Design
	Locarno International Film Festival	2009	Semaine De La Critique	Best Documentary
	San Francisco International Film Festival	2010	Golden Gate Award	Best Documentary
	Diagonale (Austria)	2009	Best Artistic Montage	Best Documentary Editing
	Kinofest Lünen (Germany)	2009	Lüdia	Audience Award
	Eurodok (Norway)	2010	Audience Award	Best Documentary
	Film Weekend Würzberg	2010	Audience Award	Best Documentary
Disgustingly Healthy		2007	Ekotop Film Award	Best Documentary
Half A Chance?		2003	German-French Journalist Award	Young Talent Award
