= Yoko Nozaki =

Japanese pianist

Yoko Nozaki (born c. 1948) is a pianist and musician specializing in chamber music. She is married to the Grammy Award-winning pianist Emanuel Ax.

== Background and career ==
Nozaki was born in Tokyo, Japan and studied at the Toho Gakuen School of Music. At age 12, she and her family moved to the United States as her father, a biochemist, had taken a position at Duke University in Durham, North Carolina. She entered The Juilliard School in New York City in 1966 when she was 18, studying under Irwin Freundlich. In 1970 she won the Concert Artists Guild Award and graduated from Juilliard with a bachelor's degree in music. She later completed her master's degree at Juilliard, specializing in piano.

Nozaki has collaborated with husband Emanuel Ax as a piano duo and other chamber orchestras as a guest artist. She took a brief hiatus from the concert stage in 1979 to raise their children.

== Personal life ==
Nozaki met her husband Emanuel Ax while both were piano students at Juilliard. They married in 1974 and have two children, Sarah and Joseph. They reside in New York City.
