= Heiichiro Ohyama =

Japanese musician

- Born: January 1, 1947; Japan, Kyoto
- Other name: 大山平一郎
- Occupation: violist

Heiichiro Ohyama (大山 平一郎, Ōyama Heiichirō; born January 1, 1947 in Kyoto, Japan) is a Japanese conductor and violist.

== Biography ==
He is a conductor and violist. He serves as music director and conductor of the Santa Barbara Chamber Orchestra, and as principal chief conductor of the Kyushu Symphony Orchestra in Fukuoka, Fukuoka, Japan.

Ohyama has long been in demand as a violist and has performed throughout the United States and abroad as recitalist and chamber musician at festivals including Casals Festival, Kuhumo International Festival (Finland), Johannesen International Music Festival (Canada), Okinawa Moon Beach Music Festival (Japan), Brescia and Bergamo Festivals (Italy), Chamber Music Northwest, Sarasota Music Festival and Caramor Chamber Music Festival. He has collaborated with many of the soloist around the world, including Lynn Harrell, Gidon Kremer, Radu Lupu, Lynnette Seah, Isaac Stern, and Alexander Souptel.

In 1974, he won the Young Concert Artists International Auditions which led to his New York City recital debut at Carnegie Hall. In 1979, he was named principal violist of the Los Angeles Philharmonic under Carlo Maria Giulini, a position he held for 13 years. In 1981, he began conducting the Youth String Orchestra of the Crossroads School for Sciences and Arts. In 1983, he was appointed music director and conductor of the Santa Barbara Chamber Orchestra. In 1986, Ohyama was appointed assistant conductor of the Los Angeles Philharmonic under Maestro André Previn. He held this position for four years and conducted the Philharmonic in many concerts, including subscription concerts at the Los Angeles Music Center, the Hollywood Bowl and the Los Angeles Philharmonic Institute.

He has also held the positions of principal conductor of the Round Top Music Festival in Texas, music director and conductor of the Northwest Chamber Orchestra in Seattle, music director and conductor of the Cayuga Chamber Orchestra in New York City, artistic director of the Santa Fe Chamber Music Festival and of the La Jolla Chamber Music Society’s SummerFest La Jolla. He was a professor of music in the University of California school system for over 30 years.

In 1990, Ohyama made his European conducting debut with the Orchestra of the Opera de Lyon and in two concerts with the Royal Philharmonic Orchestra at the Royal Festival Hall in London. Since then, he has made conducting appearances with the San Diego Symphony, Baltimore Symphony, Singapore Symphony Orchestra, New Mexico Symphony, Ohio Chamber Orchestra, Brandenburg Symphony Orchestra (Germany), Hale Symphony (England), Sapporo Symphony, Kyoto Symphony and Toho Music School Orchestra (Japan), New York Chamber Orchestra, Los Angeles Chamber Orchestra, Ohio Chamber Orchestra, Milwaukee Chamber Orchestra, Royal Academy Sinfonietta (England), as well as conducted the San Francisco Symphony for its Wet Ink Festival. He also took the Asia America Symphony Orchestra on a tour of Japan in 1992.

He studied at the Toho Gakuen School of Music in Japan.

== Reviews ==
"Heiichiro Ohyama's programming continues to be a model of sense and sensibility...he knows the secret of instilling a familiar piece with new life, and conducts it as if it's the first time anyone in the hall has really heard it."

-Santa Barbara News Press

"The concert was led by Heiichiro Ohyama with characteristic vigor and grace."

-Santa Barbara Independent

"Mr. Ohyama also led the seemingly underrehearsed orchestra in Rossini's "Italiana in Algeri" Overture.

New York Times. Thursday, February 15, 2007
