= Catania Jazz Festival =

Jazz festival in Catania, Sicily, Italy

- Festival logo

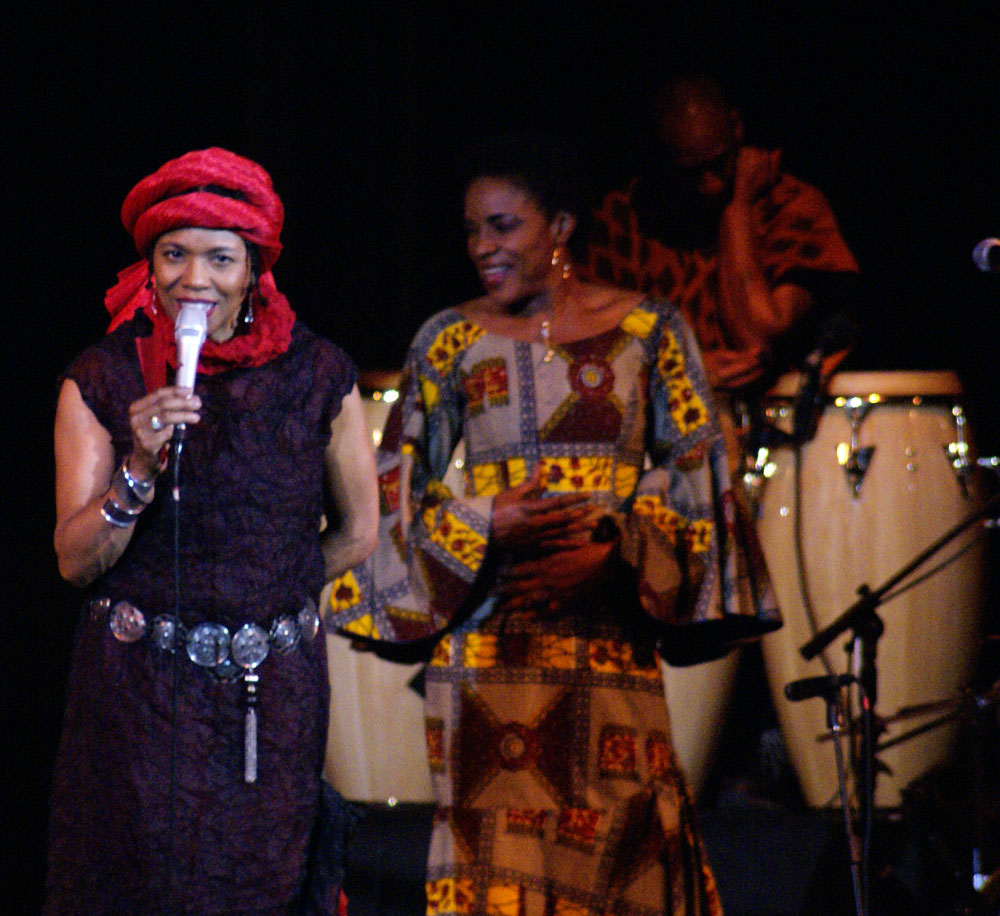
- Dee Dee Bridgewater in Catania 14 May 2007
- Status: Active
- Genre: Jazz festival
- Locations: Teatro ABC, MA Concerti etc.
- Coordinates: 37.511560°N 15.099060°E
- Country: Italy
- Years active: 42
- Inaugurated: 24 November 1983
- Organiser: L'associazione Catania Jazz
- Website: www.cataniajazz.com

The Catania Jazz Festival is a jazz festival in Catania, Sicily, Italy. An international festival, it has been held since 1983. Sometimes the festival is held at different locations over several months, providing an entire season of jazz performances.

== History ==
The first show of the Catania Jazz Association was staged on 24 November 1983 by the Sun Ra Arkestra. Since then the Catania Jazz Association has brought some of the biggest names in international jazz to the slopes of Mount Etna. The festival has featured legendary jazz performers such as McCoy Tyner, Ornette Coleman, Dizzy Gillespie, Wayne Shorter, Dee Dee Bridgewater and Jaco Pastorius. The festival has highlighted new age and eastern music, organized the first World of Music, Arts and Dance (WOMAD) festival in Italy, and organized a show with only female performers. The festival is one of the most important jazz events in Sicily, covering an entire winter concert season.

== Recent events ==
In July 2015 the Catania Jazz Association organized the Catania Jazz Marathon over a five-day period in the courtyard of the Benedictine Monastery. 20 alternating groups played, each for no more than 1/2 hour. A panel of critics and judges selected performers to play in a variety of Italian and European festivals, including the Catania Jazz Festival's 2015–16 winter season.

Concerts are held at various locations in Catania. One of the venues has been the Teatro Metropolitan. The XXXIII Season (5 December 2015 – 13 May 2016) staged Brad Mehldau, Larry Grenadier and Jeff Ballard at the Ciminiere di Piazzale Asia, and several shows at the Teatro Abc (Via Pietro Mascagni 92). Other shows were held at the MA (Via Vela 6). The 2016–17 festival began on 5 November 2016 and was to continue until 19 April 2017. Different shows were staged at the Teatro ABC and MA Concerti. In 2017 the festival featured John Scofield and the Kyle Eastwood Band.

== Sources ==
- Andrews, Robert; Brown, Jules; Davies, Jane O. (1993), Sicily, Rough Guides, ISBN 978-1-85828-037-0
- "Associazone Catania Jazz". Italiajazz.it.
- "Catania Jazz 2015/2016", Lapis (in Italian)
- Catania Jazz Festival, Traghettiper-sicilia.it, archived from the original on 13 May 2021
- "Catania Jazz Marathon", l'Agenda Musica, Universita degli Studi di Catania, July 2015
- Storia (in Italian), Catania Jazz
