= Emanuel Ax =

Polish-American pianist and academic (born 1949)

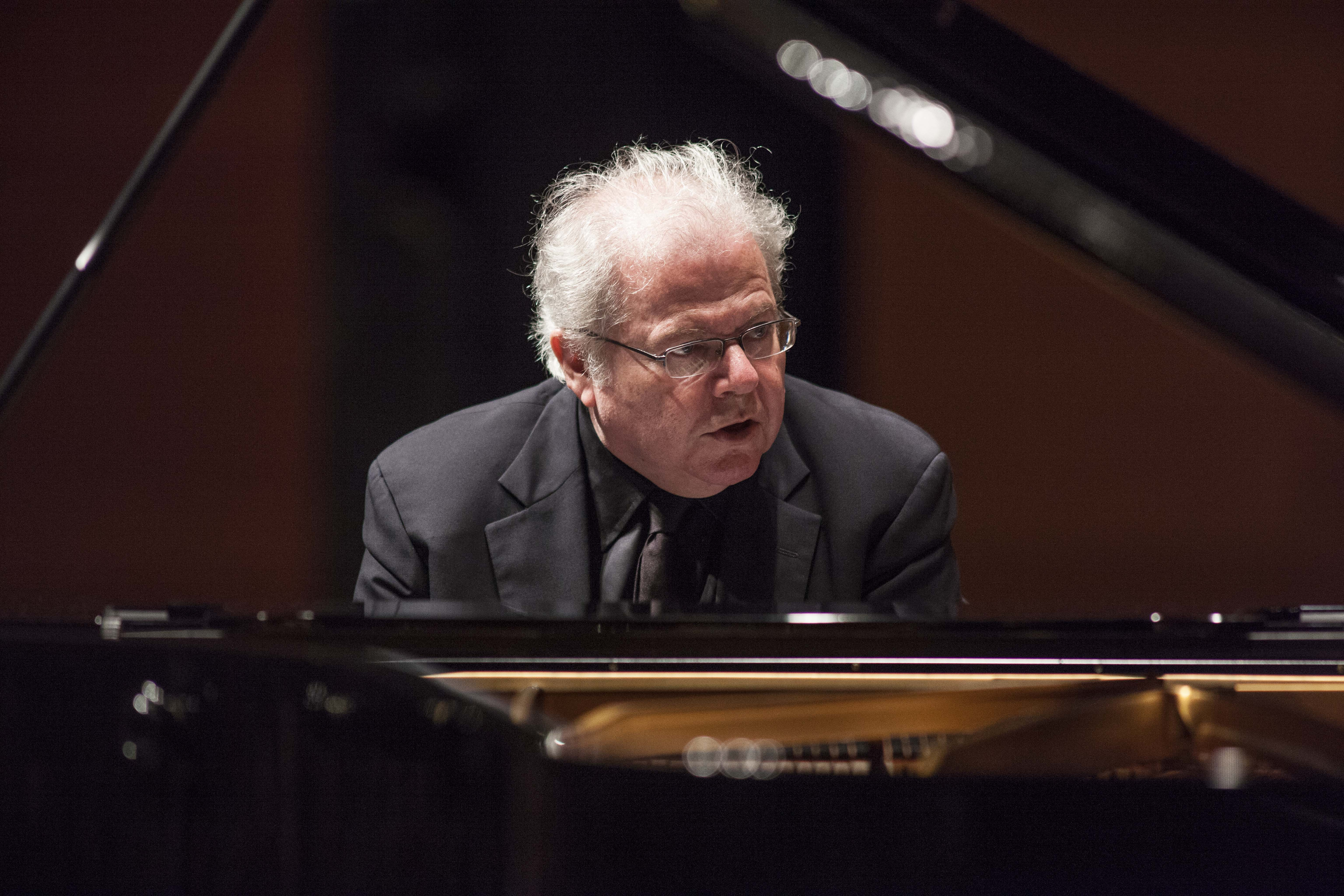
- Ax in 2014
- Born: June 8, 1949 (age 77); Lviv, Ukrainian SSR, Soviet Union
- Occupation: Classical pianist

Emanuel "Manny" Ax (born June 8, 1949) is a Polish-American classical pianist. He is known for his chamber music collaborations with cellist Yo-Yo Ma and violinists Isaac Stern and Young Uck Kim, as well as his piano recitals and performances with major orchestras in the world.

Starting at age 12, Ax studied piano under Mieczysław Munz of the Juilliard School. He won honorable mention at the VIII International Chopin Piano Competition in 1970, third place at the Vianna da Motta International Music Competition in 1971, seventh place at the Queen Elisabeth Competition in 1972, and first prize in the Arthur Rubinstein International Piano Master Competition in 1974.

Ax has been a faculty member at the Juilliard School since 1990.

== Early life ==
Ax was born into the Polish-Jewish family of Joachim and Hellen Ax in Lviv, Ukraine, formerly part of the Soviet Union. Both parents were Nazi concentration camp survivors. Ax began to study piano at the age of six; his father was his first piano teacher. When he was seven, the family moved to Warsaw, Poland, where he studied piano at the State Music School on Miodowa Street. Two years later, Ax's family moved to Winnipeg, Manitoba, Canada, where he continued to study music, including as a member of The Junior Musical Club of Winnipeg. In 1961, when Ax was 12 years old, the family moved to New York City, and Ax continued his piano studies under Mieczysław Munz of the Juilliard School until 1976, when Munz left New York to teach in Japan. In 1970, Ax received his B.A. in French at Columbia University and became an American citizen. The same year, he won honorable mention at the VIII International Chopin Piano Competition in Warsaw. In 1971, he won third place at the Vianna da Motta International Music Competition. In 1972, he placed 7th at the Queen Elisabeth Competition in Brussels. He caught the public eye when he won the Arthur Rubinstein International Piano Master Competition in 1974, where he was personally congratulated by renowned pianist Arthur Rubinstein, who was a judge for the competition. The New York Times reported on Ax's win in 1974 and said that in addition to a prize of $5,000, Ax "will receive the Artur Rubenstein Gold Medal engagements with the Israel Philharmonic and the BBC Orchestra, a recording contract with RCA and an artist‐management contract with Hurok Artists."

In 1975, Ax was named recipient of the Michaels Award of Young Concert Artists, and in 1979, he was named recipient of the Avery Fisher Prize.

== Views ==
Recalling his competition years, Ax said "You tend to forget how really awful the tension was. Here you were, No. 19, trying to play something better than No. 18. Ridiculous." For Ax, saying which pianist is better is only a subjective judgment at the highest levels: "can anyone really go to piano recital and say Horowitz is better than Rubinstein? The most I can say is that Rubinstein speaks to me with greater voice than this one or that one." Though he admits that competitions are a necessary means toward success for pianists, Ax hopes to never "sit on a jury and eliminate people".

When speaking about performance repertoire, Ax said that one should not perform at a concert with pieces they have only learned recently: "People think pianists are lazy because they play the same works again and again, but it's not that. It's being afraid of something you haven't done in public before. A conductor can do what he does very well whether his hands are cold or his baton is trembling. He can still get what he wants. But if I'm afraid, things will suffer. Physical and mental coordination must be perfect."

== Performing career ==
Ax has been the main duo recital partner of cellist Yo-Yo Ma since August 3, 1973, when the pair performed its first public recital at the Marlboro Music School and Festival. They have recorded much of the cello/piano repertoire together. Ax also played quartets briefly with Ma and violinists Isaac Stern and Jaime Laredo. Before the quartet disbanded in 2001 due to the death of Stern, they recorded works for Sony by Brahms, Fauré, Beethoven, Schumann and Mozart. Ax is also a featured guest artist in a documentary film about the Toronto Symphony Orchestra and Peter Oundjian, Five Days in September; the Rebirth of an Orchestra.

In 1997, Ax was the music director of the Ojai Music Festival alongside the conductor Daniel Harding.

He holds honorary doctorates of music from Yale University (awarded in May 2007), Skidmore College, New England Conservatory of Music, and Columbia University. He is a recipient of Yale University's Sanford Medal.

In 2012, Ax was inducted into the American Classical Music Hall of Fame. He served on the Board of Trustees at Carnegie Hall in 2018.

== Musical style ==
Ax is a particular supporter of contemporary composers and has given distinguished world premieres including the piano concerto of John Williams, Century Rolls by John Adams, Seeing by Christopher Rouse and Red Silk Dance by Bright Sheng. He also performs works by such diverse figures as Michael Tippett, Hans Werner Henze, Joseph Schwantner, Arnold Schoenberg and Paul Hindemith, as well as more traditional composers such as Haydn, Mozart, Beethoven, and Chopin.

== Personal life ==
Ax lives in New York City with his wife, pianist Yoko Nozaki, and has two children. He converses in fluent Polish with his family at home.

Ax co-constructed the April 19, 2017, New York Times Crossword Puzzle and is one of the ambassadors to Music Traveler, together with Billy Joel, Hans Zimmer, John Malkovich, Sean Lennon, and Adrien Brody.

== Recordings ==
1981:

- Beethoven: Complete Cello Sonatas, Vol. 1 (with Yo-Yo Ma)

1984:

- Beethoven: Complete Cello Sonatas, Vol. 2 (with Yo-Yo Ma)
- Chopin: Piano Concertos No. 1 and No. 2, recorded 1978 and 1980 (with Philadelphia Orchestra, cond. Eugene Ormandy)

1985:

- Brahms: Cello Sonatas (with Yo-Yo Ma)

1986:

- Beethoven: Complete Sonatas for Cello and Piano, Vol. 3 (with Yo-Yo Ma)

1988:

- Schumann: Cello Concerto / Fantasiestücke, Op. 73 / Adagio and Allegro, Op. 70 / Fünf Stücke im Volkston, Op. 102 (with Yo-Yo Ma)
- Dvořák: Piano Trios (with Yo-Yo Ma and Young Uck Kim)
- Shostakovich: Piano Trio / Cello Sonata (with Yo-Yo Ma)

1989:

- Strauss and Britten: Cello Sonatas (with Yo-Yo Ma)

1990:

- Brahms: The Piano Quartets (with Yo-Yo Ma, Isaac Stern, and Jaime Laredo)

1991:

- Prokofiev and Rachmaninoff: Cello Sonatas (with Yo-Yo Ma)

1992:

- Brahms: Cello Sonatas (with Yo-Yo Ma)

1993:

- Fauré: Piano Quartets (with Yo-Yo Ma, Isaac Stern, and Jaime Laredo)

1994:

- Chopin: Chamber Music (tracks 1–9, with Yo-Yo Ma (tracks 1–9), Pamela Frank (tracks 1–4), and Ewa Osinska (track 10))
- Beethoven, Schumann: Piano Quartets (with Yo-Yo Ma, Isaac Stern, and Jaime Laredo)

1995:

- Brahms, Beethoven, Mozart: Clarinet Trios (with Yo-Yo Ma and Richard Stoltzman)

1996:

- Lieberson: King Gesar; Corigliano: Phantasmagoria (with Yo-Yo Ma (all tracks), tracks 1-7: Omar Ebrahim, Peter Serkin, Andras Adorjan, Deborah Marshall, William Purvis, David Taylor, Stefan Huge, and Peter Lieberson)
- Schubert: Trout Quintet; Arpeggione Sonata (with Yo-Yo Ma (tracks 1–8), Pamela Frank (tracks 1–5), Rebecca Young (tracks 1–5), Edgar Meyer (tracks 1–5), and Barbara Bonney (track 9))

1997:

- Mozart: The Piano Quartets (with Yo-Yo Ma, Isaac Stern, and Jaime Laredo)

1999:

- Dvořák: Piano Quartet No. 2 / Brahms: Cello Sonata No. 3 (with Yo-Yo Ma, Isaac Stern (tracks 1–4), and Jaime Laredo (tracks 1–4))

2010:

- Mendelssohn: Piano Trios and Songs Without Words / Beethoven: Ghost Piano Trio (with Yo-Yo Ma, Itzhak Perlman (tracks 1–8), Pamela Frank (track 14))

== Awards and recognitions ==
- 1970 - Honorable Mention, VIII International Chopin Piano Competition in Warsaw
- 1972 – Seventh Prize, Queen Elisabeth Competition in Brussels.
- 1974 – Arthur Rubinstein International Piano Master Competition in Tel Aviv
- 1979 – Avery Fisher Prize in New York City
- 2007 – Fellow of the American Academy of Arts and Sciences
- 2009 – Member of the American Philosophical Society
- 2012 - Induction into the American Classical Music Hall of Fame
- 2013 – Echo Klassik Award for Solo Recording of the Year (19th century music/Piano) for his Variations recording of works by Beethoven, Haydn and Schumann.
- Award of Excellence, The International Center in New York

Grammy Award for Best Chamber Music Performance:

- Emanuel Ax and Yo-Yo Ma for Brahms: Cello and Piano Sonatas in E Minor and F (1986)
- Emanuel Ax and Yo-Yo Ma for Beethoven: Cello and Piano Sonata No. 4 in C & Variations (1987)
- Emanuel Ax, Jaime Laredo, Yo-Yo Ma and Isaac Stern for Brahms: Piano Quartets (Op. 25 and 26) (1992)
- Emanuel Ax and Yo-Yo Ma for Brahms: Sonatas for Cello & Piano (1993)
- Emanuel Ax, Yo-Yo Ma and Richard Stoltzman for Brahms/Beethoven/Mozart: Clarinet Trios (1996)

Grammy Award for Best Instrumental Soloist Performance (without orchestra):

- Emanuel Ax for Haydn: Piano Sonatas, Nos. 32, 47, 53, 59 (1995)
- Emanuel Ax for Haydn: Piano Sonatas Nos. 29, 31, 34, 35 & 49 (2004)

== See also ==
- List of Poles
