= Jacob Shaw (musician) =

- Born: 1988 (age 37–38); London, England
- Genre: Classical,
- Occupations: Cultural Personality, Solo Cellist
- Instrument: Cello
- Labels: Roven Records, Divine Art, SCS Collection / Evidence Classics
- Website: http://www.scandinaviancelloschool.com/

Jacob Shaw (born 1988) is a classical cellist and the executive director of Scandinavian Cello School. He is the Professor of Cello at the Royal Northern College of Music (RNCM) in Manchester, UK and the Visiting International Chair of Cello at the Royal Welsh College of Music and Drama (RWCMD). Formally he was Director of Culture for UNESCO World Heritage site of Stevns Klint (Stevns Klint Experience) and held the "Gaspar Cassado Chair" Professor of Cello at Academia Marshall in Barcelona, Spain.

== Early life ==
Born in London in 1988 into a family of professional musicians, he first studied at the Yehudi Menuhin School in Surrey, before going to France to receive musical guidance from and entering into the class of Geneviève Teulières-Sommer at the École Normale de Musique de Paris.

== Musical career ==
Shaw has given concerts across 5 continents.

He also works with outreach projects, playing in hospitals, prisons, youth centers and has established "Radical Classic" as a way to get in touch with a new generation of classical music lovers. Shaw formed the Shaw String Trio with his father and sister, and in 2009, he founded with his family the Festival International de Musique de Chambre in south-west France in 2009.

== Cultural Entrepreneur ==
Recognised as one of the top business talents "Talent 100" by the Scandinavian newspaper Berlingske, Shaw has lectured worldwide on cultural entrepreneurship. He has won awards locally, nationally and internationally and is a guest professor in the subject for 2022 at the Stauffer Academy in Cremona.

A member of the advisory board for southcoast Denmark tourism VISM and in 2022 he won the Danish National Radio P2 "firesoul personality". Vice-chairman of Lund Harbour (Stevns) board.

Jacob Shaw was the Director of Culture (Kulturchef) for Stevns Klint Visitor Center (Stevns Klint Besøgscenter ApS) at the UNESCO World Heritage Site of Stevns Klint in Denmark from April 2022 to March 2023.

== Support of young talents ==
Alongside giving masterclasses worldwide in some of the top universities and conservatories (such as Northwestern University, Juilliard School, CCOM, Royal Irish Academy of Music, Shanghai Conservatory, etc.), Jacob was appointed the Professor of Cello and “Cassado Chair” at the Academia Marshall in Barcelona - where Pablo Casals and Gaspar Cassado used to teach. He left this role in 2020 to dedicate his time to Scandinavian Cello School. In 2024 aged 35 he won the position of Professor of Cello at the Royal Northern College of Music (RNCM) in Manchester, UK. At the start of the academic year 2024 he was named Visiting International Chair of Cello at the Royal Welsh College of Music and Drama.

In 2016 he created his own foundation, the Scandinavian Cello School, to support educate and promote young cellists. It is hailed for unconventional teaching methods and a special focus on mental health within the music industry through experiments with "work-life" balance. In 2021 it exploded on the world scene, reaching more than 2 billion worldwide (source: Hypefactors) and featuring on the front page of the New York Times.

Alumni and cellists they support have won major international competitions, released on prominent CD labels and won top orchestral positions.

The foundation has since expanded and in 2018 they opened the world's first ever permanent cello center and retreat close to the UNESCO heritage site of Stevns Klint on the Danish coastline, 1 hour from Copenhagen. They are striving to become self-sufficient, based at "The Musical Farm". SCS now welcome musicians and artists from all over the world - there are no tuition fees for any project.

In 2019, Jacob was invited to perform by Vienna Philharmonic Orchestra during their annual January ball, and he took with him 8 cellists from the foundation to appear at this special gala event, whilst in the same year Deutsche Grammophon released “Maddalena and the Prince”, and proceeds from the CD were donated to SCS. He was re-invited to the Vienna Philharmonic Orchestra annual ball in 2024.

Scandinavian Cello School is a partner of UNESCO.

== Discography ==
Live in Festival International de Musique de Chambre en Charente (2012 - private)

DEBUT (2015 - Roven Records)

From the Old World to the New (2016 - Divine Art)

The Road to Vienna (2024 - SCS Collection / Evidence Classics)
