= Nozaki Station =

Nozaki Station is the name of two railway stations in Japan:

- Nozaki Station (Osaka)
- Nozaki Station (Tochigi)
