= Hyung-ki Joo =

British musician (born 1973)

- 주형기
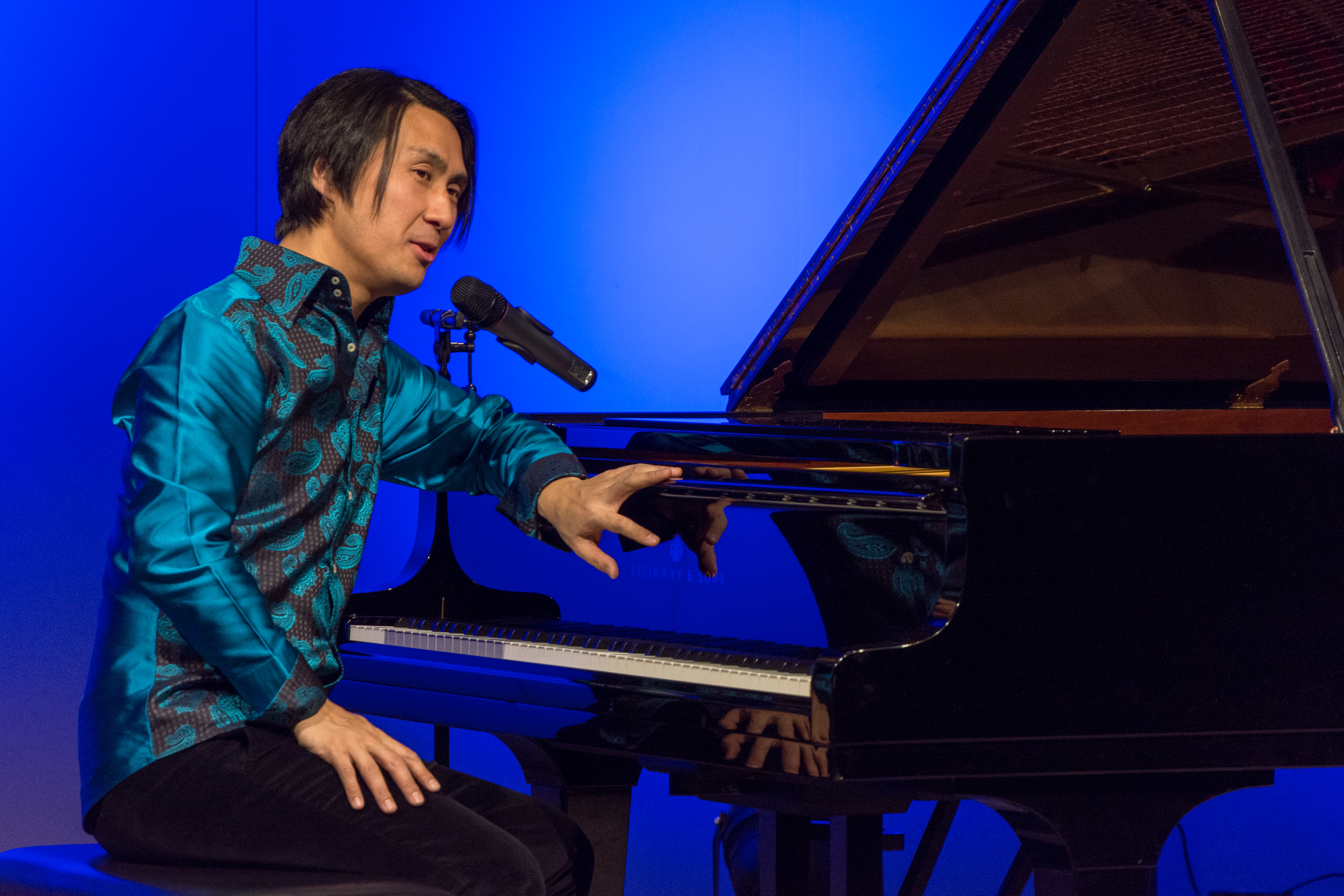
- Hyung-ki Joo during a concert at Kulturfabrik Hainburg, Austria, 2017
- Born: England, UK
- Education: Yehudi Menuhin School; Manhattan School of Music
- Occupations: Pianist, composer, comedian
- Known for: Fantasies & Delusions; Igudesman & Joo; Dimension

Korean name
- Hangul: 주형기
- RR: Ju Hyeonggi
- MR: Chu Hyŏnggi

Hyung-ki Joo (Korean: 주형기) is a British-Korean pianist, composer, comedian and one half of the comedy-musical duo Igudesman & Joo. Billy Joel chose Joo to arrange and record his classical piano pieces for the album Fantasies & Delusions. It was recorded in the Mozart Hall of the Vienna Konzerthaus.

== Biography ==
Born in England of South Korean parents, Joo began his formal training in the UK at the Yehudi Menuhin School with Peter Norris and Seta Tanyel and later earned his Bachelor and Master of Music degrees from Manhattan School of Music, where he studied with Nina Svetlanova. Other teachers include Richard Goode and Oleg Maisenberg.

Yehudi Menuhin himself had chosen Joo to perform as a soloist for his eightieth birthday concert at the Barbican Hall, London.

As a soloist, he has performed with conductors such as Sergiu Comissiona, Andrey Andreev, Rumon Gamba, Daniel Raiskin, and Yehudi Menuhin. In 2001, he founded a piano trio called Dimension, with Rafal Payne and Thomas Carroll.

He has also created and performed several shows which integrate comedy with classical music. His show, A Little Nightmare Music, co-created with Aleksey Igudesman, has been performed all over the world since its world premiere at the Vienna Musikverein.

He is one of the early team members of the Music Traveler GmbH. Music Traveler has several notable musicians as ambassadors; Billy Joel, Hans Zimmer, John Malkovich, Sean Lennon, and Adrien Brody are their chief ambassadors.
