= Yehudi Menuhin School =

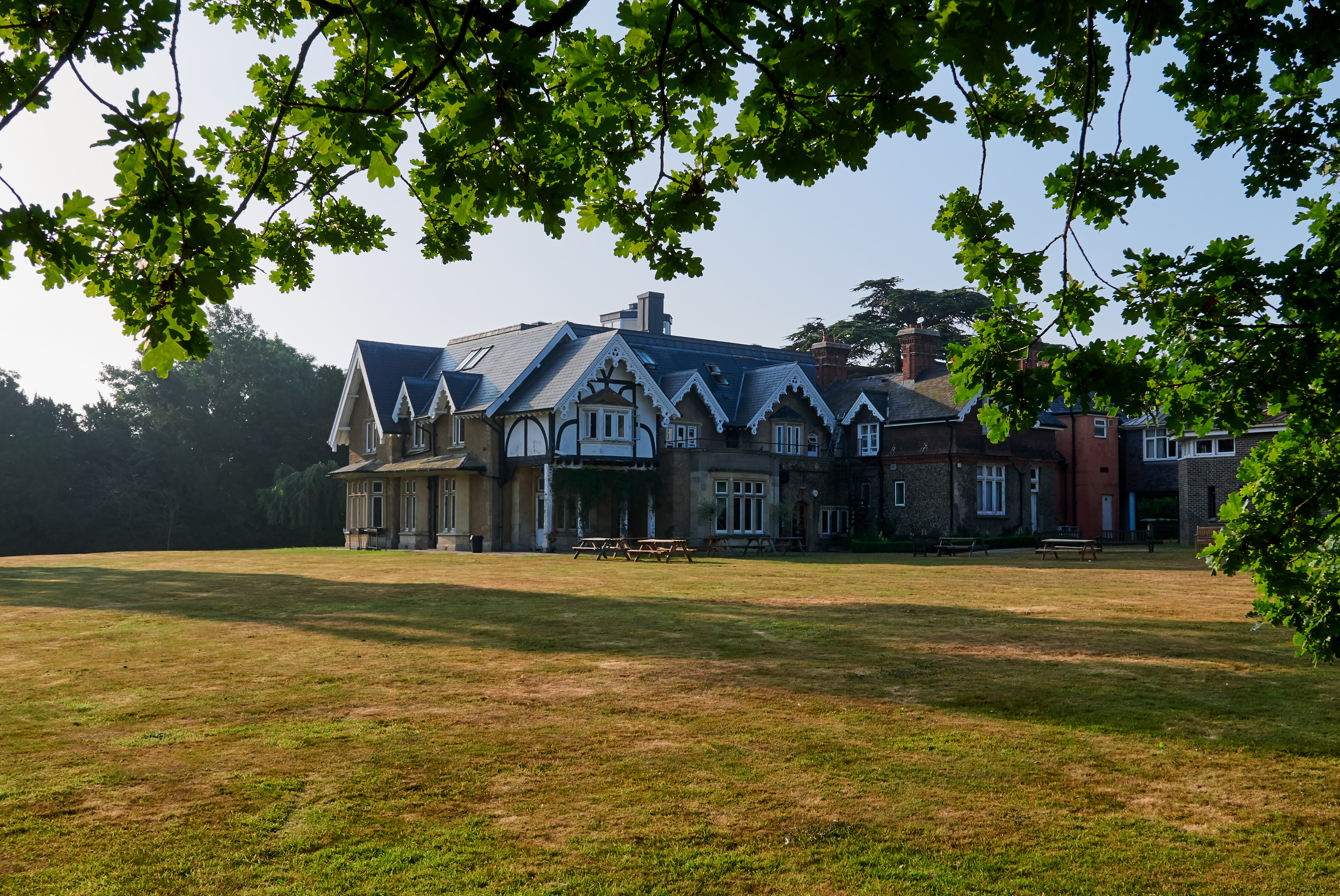

Location
- Stoke d'Abernon; Cobham, Surrey, KT11 3QQ; England; 51.3064°N 0.3767°W

Information
- Type: Private day and boarding school Music school
- Established: 1963
- Founder: Yehudi Menuhin
- Department for Education URN: 125428 Tables
- President: Tasmin Little
- Head: Robin Harskin
- Gender: Coeducational
- Age: 9 to 19
- Enrolment: 81
- Houses: Harris House; Music House
- Website: Official website

The Yehudi Menuhin School is a specialist music school in Stoke d'Abernon, Surrey, England, founded in 1963 by violinist and conductor Yehudi Menuhin. The current director of music is the British classical violist Rosalind Ventris. The school is one of the five established musical schools for school-age children in the United Kingdom, along with Chetham's School of Music, Wells Cathedral School, the Purcell School and St. Mary's Music School, Edinburgh. It is mainly funded by the Department for Education's Music and Dance Scheme, by philanthropic foundations, by donations and bequests from individuals, and by regular support from the Friends of the Yehudi Menuhin School.

Yehudi Menuhin founded the school to provide an environment and tuition for musically gifted children from all over the world to pursue their love of music, develop their musical potential, and achieve standards of performance on stringed instruments and piano at the highest level. Today's School provides a holistic musical and academic education for around 85 students aged from 9 to 19, with specialist tuition on the stringed instruments, piano and classical guitar. The majority of the school's pupils are boarders, with roughly a dozen day pupils, mainly in the younger age groups.

It is the school's ambition to be 'needs-blind' in its admission process. Parents are charged fees in accordance with their ability to pay, with around three-quarters supported by the Music and Dance Scheme and the remainder assisted by bursaries from the school.

The school is a registered charity under English law.

The Menuhin Hall located in the school grounds hosts a full programme of concerts throughout the year. The grounds feature many species of large trees and open greenery.

== History ==
The institutional legacy of Yehudi Menuhin (1916–99) includes the Menuhin International Competition for Young Violinists, Live Music Now (specially active in the United Kingdom, Germany, Austria and France), the Menuhin Festival Gstaad, the Brussels-based International Menuhin Foundation and the Fundación Yehudi Menuhin España, but the Menuhin School has been described as 'his most enduring contribution to musical life'. When awarded a life peerage in 1993, he chose the title Lord Menuhin of Stoke d'Abernon, and he is buried in the grounds of the school.

It was founded in 1963 in London, moving to its present premises a year later. The principal building (to which others were added) is a Victorian Neo-Gothic house in Stoke d'Abernon, easily accessible by road and train from London and set in fifteen acres of parkland.

Menuhin was partly inspired by the example of the Central School of Music in Moscow, but "our school was not intended to be a copy. Moscow had three hundred students. I started with fifteen and by 1972 had thirty-eight. Apart from differences of scale, however, our priorities were different. Moscow was training soloists, we wanted to train musical all-rounders, fitted to moving on into teaching, chamber groups, orchestras or solo work..." A landmark in the musical development of the school was, however, his recruitment to the teaching staff in 1992 of Natasha Boyarsky, who had been head of strings in the Tchaikovsky Conservatoire in Moscow.

Menuhin's aim was to provide the school's pupils with outstanding teachers, adequate time to practise, frequent opportunities to perform, ensemble work with other gifted children, and a broad musical and general-academic education, all within a nourishing family community where each individual can develop his or her full potential. After its first ten years it was awarded special status by the Government as a Centre of Excellence in the Performing Arts, thus eligible for support from the ministry of education. Menuhin had been home-schooled himself by his parents and tutors in San Francisco, but he believed that it was in the interest of musically gifted children to live and study with their peers.

After Menuhin's death in 1999, the school undertook a fundraising drive to make possible the construction of a state-of-the-art concert hall, the Menuhin Hall, which was opened in 2006 with a concert conducted by Mstislav Rostropovich, who had accepted the honorary position of president in succession to Menuhin. The Menuhin Hall hosts a full programme of Showcase Concerts, featuring School pupils, as well as concerts and master classes given by established musicians, and with its excellent acoustics it is much in demand by recording companies. After his death later in 2006, Rostropovich was succeeded as president by Daniel Barenboim. The current president of the school is Tasmin Little, who was appointed in December 2019.

The Friends of the Yehudi Menuhin School, founded by Lord Menuhin in 1971 together with some local supporters, have now grown to over 750 supporters from all over the world, offering financial assistance to the school and an encouraging presence at concerts given by the pupils.

The school embarked on a wide-ranging development programme in 2013–14 after its first fifty years, and to mark Menuhin's centenary in 2016. This has continued since with the aim of increasing its endowment for bursaries and also upgrading its facilities.

In 2022, the school announced its 2022-27 strategic plan, entitled "21st Century Musicians". This details the schools five values: pursuit of excellence, intellectual curiosity, integrity, community and kindness.

== Music directors ==
- Marcel Gazelle (1963-1969)
- Robert Masters (1969-1981)
- Peter Norris (1981-1987)
- Stephen Potts (1988-1998)
- Malcolm Singer (1998-2017)
- Òscar Colomina i Bosch (2017–20)
- Ashley Wass (2020-2025)
- Rosalind Ventris (2025-)

== Notable former pupils ==
- Levine Andrade, violinist and violist (1954–2018)
- Corina Belcea, violinist
- Nicola Benedetti, violinist
- Colin Carr, cellist
- Halli Cauthery, composer
- Corinne Chapelle, violinist
- Bobby Chen, pianist
- Beverley Davison, violinist
- Cheryl Frances-Hoad, composer
- Tasya Hodges, cellist
- Daniel Hope, violinist
- Alina Ibragimova, violinist
- Aleksey Igudesman, violinist and composer
- Hyung-ki Joo, pianist and composer
- Nigel Kennedy, violinist
- Tasmin Little, violinist
- Kevin Loh, guitarist
- Aubrey Murphy, violinist
- Lü Siqing, violinist
- Charles Owen, pianist
- Wu Qian, pianist
- Jacob Shaw, cellist
- Alexander Sitkovetsky, violinist
- Laura Snowden, guitarist and composer
- Valeriy Sokolov, violinist
- Kathryn Stott, pianist
- Marius Stravinsky, conductor and violinist
- Melvyn Tan, pianist
- Paul Watkins, cellist
