= Aleksey Igudesman =

German violinist

- Алексей Игу́десман
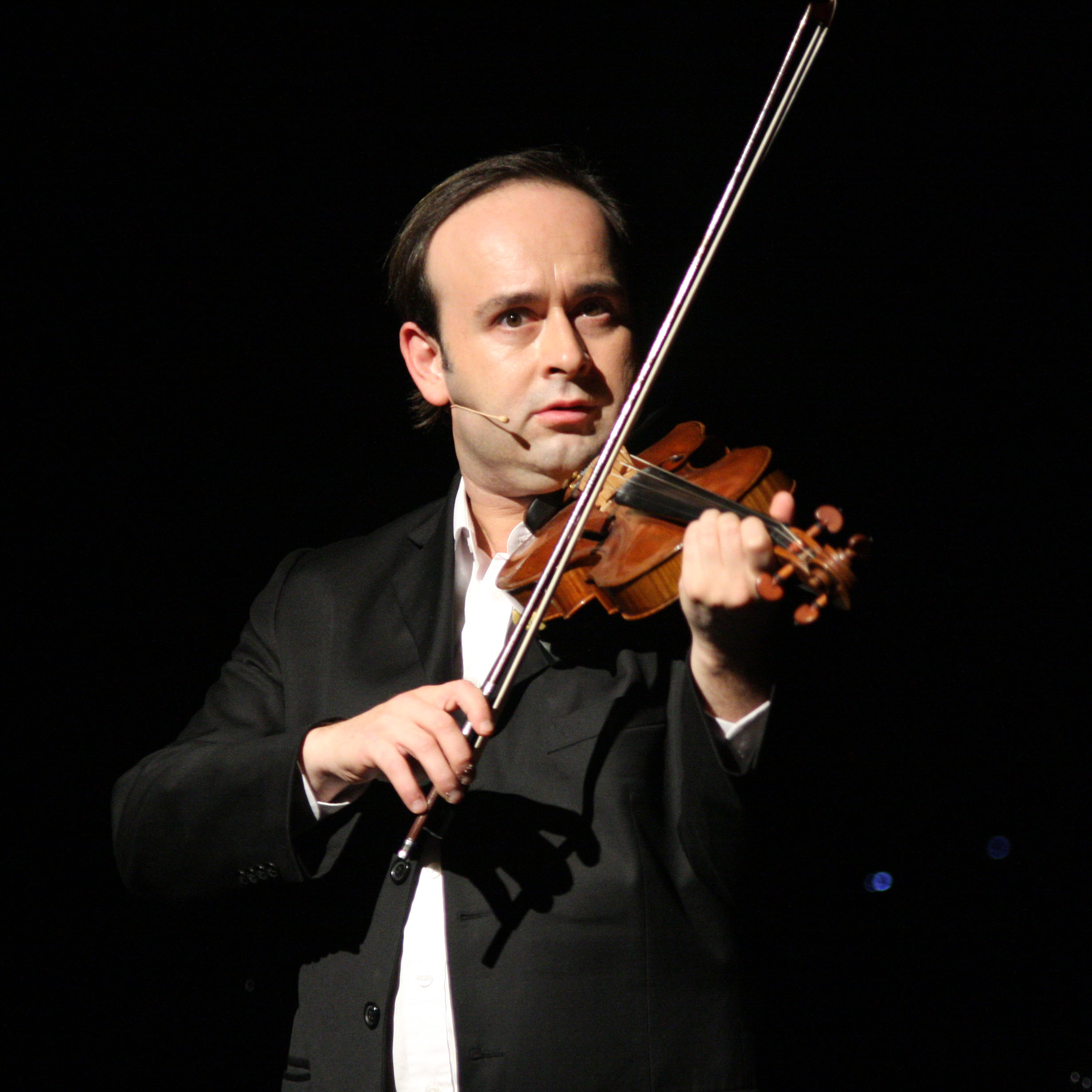
- Aleksey Igudesman
- Born: Aleksey Mikhailovich Igudesman; July 22, 1973 (age 53); Leningrad, RSFSR, Soviet Union
- Occupations: Violinist, composer

Aleksey Mikhailovich Igudesman (Russian: Алексей Михайлович Игу́десман; born 22 February 1973) is a Russian-German violinist and composer. He performs in the comedy-musical duo Igudesman & Joo.

== Biography ==
Igudesman was born in Leningrad, in what was then the Soviet Union, to a musical Jewish family. At the age of 6 he and his family immigrated to Germany. At the age of 12 he was accepted at the Yehudi Menuhin School in England. From 1989 to 1998 he studied violin with Boris Kuschnir at the Vienna Conservatory.

Igudesman has several books published by Universal Edition, including Style Workout, The Catscratchbook and Pigs Can Fly, as well as violin duet books Klezmer & More, Celtic & More, Latin & More and Asia & More.

In a project named Violins of the World, Igudesman has performed his violin duets with Gidon Kremer, Julian Rachlin, Janine Jansen, Vadim Repin, Pavel Vernikov and Alexandra Soumm. Igudesman's poems have been recited by Roger Moore. With his string trio Trilogy, he has given concerts all over the world, as well as recording several CDs for Sony BMG.

In 2009 and 2010 Igudesman published his first three violin sonatas, the second of which he dedicated to virtuoso violinist Julian Rachlin and the third to violinist Viktoria Mullova. In 2009, he won third place in the Crossover Composer Award with his work The Heat of Passion.

Igudesman tours with pianist Hyung-ki Joo as the music and comedy duo Igudesman & Joo.

Igudesman is also an actor and film director. His directing debut Noseland, a feature-length mockumentary about classical musicians such as Julian Rachlin and Mischa Maisky and actors John Malkovich and Roger Moore, premiered at the Transylvanian International Film Festival in Romania in June 2012, and won "Most Entertaining Documentary" at DocMiami 2012 and has had a cinematic release in Germany.

He is a co-founder of Music Traveler which provides an app to search and book practice rooms. Music Traveler has several notable musicians as ambassadors; Billy Joel, Hans Zimmer, John Malkovich, Sean Lennon, Adrien Brody are their chief ambassadors. Since 2017, Igudesman has been touring the world with his programme The Music Critic, in which John Malkovich plays the lead role of a music critic.

== Discography ==
- 1998: Trilogy – Triology Plays Ennio Morricone
- 1999: Trilogy – Who Killed the Viola Player?
- 2003: Trilogy – Around The World in 77 Minutes
- 2015: Aleksey Igudesman – Fasten Seat Belts
- 2016: Igudesman & Joo – You Just Have to Laugh
