= Breakthrough =

Breakthrough or break through may refer to:

== Arts ==
=== Books ===
- Break Through (book), a 2007 book about environmentalism by Ted Nordhaus and Michael Shellenberger
- Break Through (play), a 2011 episodic play portraying scenes from LGBT life
- The Breakthrough: Immunotherapy and the Race to Cure Cancer, a 2018 book by Charles Graeber
- The Breakthrough: Politics and Race in the Age of Obama, a 2009 book by journalist Gwen Ifill
- "The Breakthrough" (story), a 1971 short story by Daphne du Maurier

=== Film and television ===
- Break-through (1944 film), a Canadian documentary film
- Breakthrough (1950 film), an American war film featuring John Agar
- Breakthrough (1986 film), a Soviet disaster film
- Breakthrough (1979 film), a West German war film, sequel to Cross of Iron
- Break Through!, a 2005 Japanese film directed by Kazuyuki Izutsu
- Break-through (2006 film), a Russian drama film
- Breakthrough (2019 film), an American Christian film
- Breakthrough: With Rod Parsley, a 1996 television program featuring Rod Parsley
- Breakthrough (TV series), a 2015 National Geographic Channel television program
- The Breakthrough (TV series), a 2025 Swedish crime drama television series

=== Music ===
==== Albums ====
- Break Through (album), a 1990 album by Japanese rock band B'z
- Breakthrough (Colbie Caillat album), 2009
- Breakthrough (George Adams & Don Pullen album), 1986
- Breakthrough (The Gaslamp Killer album), 2012
- Breakthrough! (album), a 1972 album by the Cedar Walton/Hank Mobley Quintet
- The Breakthrough, a 2005 album by American singer Mary J. Blige
- Breakthru', an album by Nidji
- Breakthrough, a 1986 album by American clarinetist Eddie Daniels
- Breakthrough (Joe Bonamassa album), a 2025 album by Joe Bonamassa
- Breakthrough, a 2020 mixtape by rapper Rob Vicious

==== Songs ====
- "Breakthru" (song), a song by Queen from the 1989 album The Miracle
- "Breakthrough" (Aya Hirano song), a 2006 single
- "Breakthrough" (Lemonade Mouth song), a 2011 single
- "Breakthrough" (Twice song), a 2019 single
- "The Breakthrough", by LL Cool J from the 1987 album Bigger and Deffer
- "Breakthrough", by Modest Mouse from the 1996 album This Is a Long Drive for Someone with Nothing to Think About
- "Breakthrough", by Richard Wright from the 1996 album Broken China
- "Breakthrough", by Big Wreck from the 2001 album The Pleasure and the Greed
- "Breakthrough", a 2004 single by Hope 7
- "Break-Thru", by Dirty Projectors from the 2018 album Lamp Lit Prose

== Medicine ==
- Breakthrough infection, a case of illness in which a vaccinated individual becomes sick from the same illness that the vaccine is meant to prevent
- Breakthrough pain, sudden transitory pain that is not controlled by a patient's usual pain management regimen
- Breakthrough seizure, an epileptic seizure in a patient who is taking medicine to prevent seizures

== Prizes ==
- Breakthrough Prize

== Organizations ==
- Breakthrough (Dutch political history), a Dutch political movement in the late 1940s
- Breakthrough (human rights), a human rights organization in the U.S. and India
- Breakthrough (Transnistria), a political youth organization in Transnistria
- Breakthrough Party, a democratic socialist British political party

== Other ==
- Breakthrough (board game), an abstract strategy board game
- Breakthrough (military), a situation where an offensive force has broken through an enemy defensive line
- Emergency breakthrough, a function on land-line telephones that allows a caller to interrupt a phone conversation of another caller
- Epiphany (feeling), an experience of sudden enlightenment or of intellectual discovery
- Scrubber breakthrough, a failure mode in rebreathers when the carbon dioxide scrubber is exhausted.
- Tunnel hole-through, also known as breakthrough, when the two ends of a tunnel under construction meet
- Breakthrough role

== See also ==
- Breakthrough Initiatives, Yuri Milner's challenge research projects to science and technology
- Operation Breakthrough (disambiguation)
- Breakthru (disambiguation)
- Break (disambiguation)
- Break On Through (disambiguation)
