= Virgil Boutellis-Taft =

French violinist

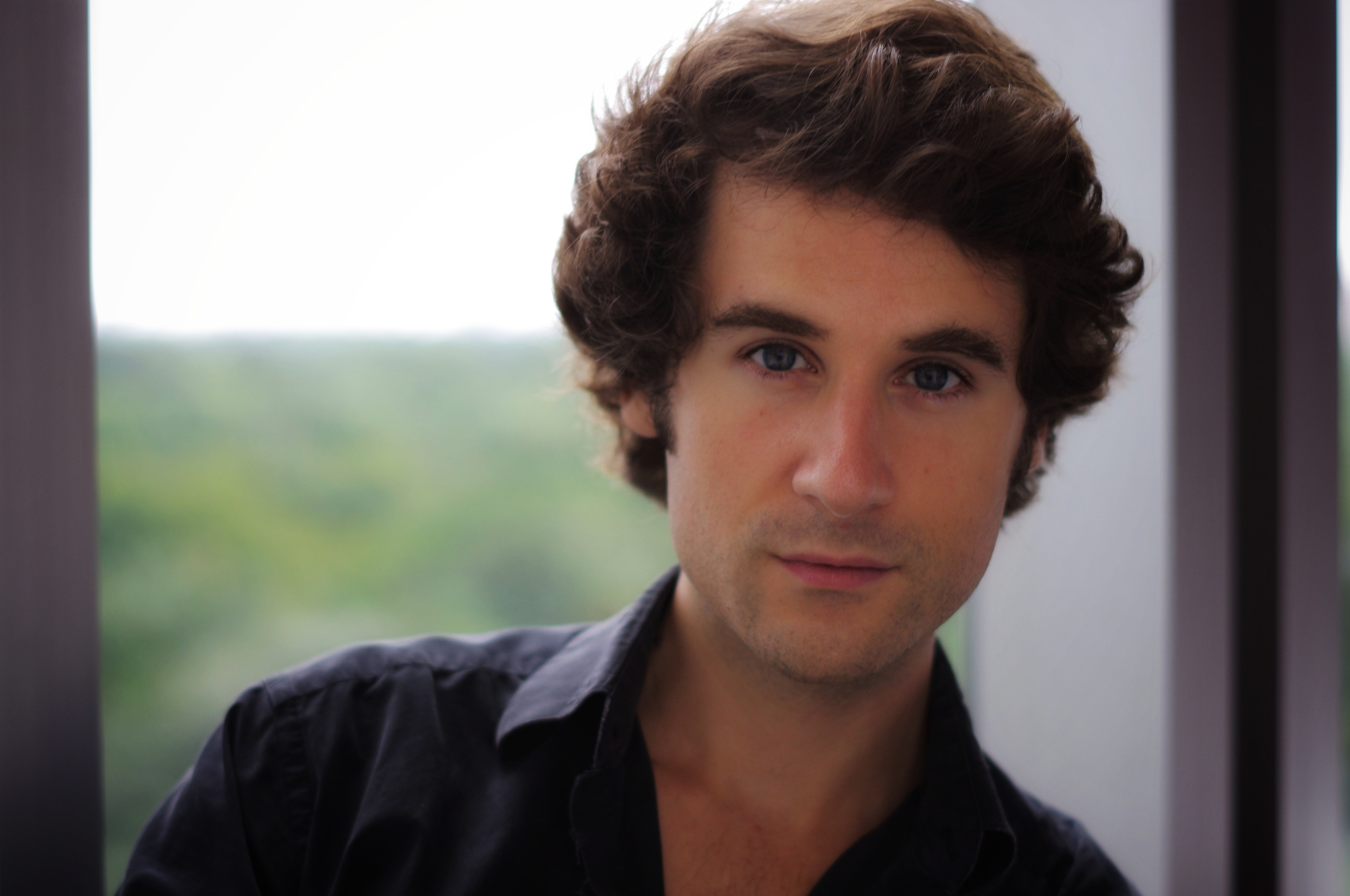
Virgil Boutellis-Taft in New York

Virgil Boutellis-Taft is a French violinist.

== Biography ==
Virgil Boutellis-Taft began studying violin and piano at the age of 6.

He entered the Conservatoire de Tours at the age of 9, in the class of Gilles Lefèvre, a pupil of Christian Ferras. Having obtained his First Prize at age 16 at the Conservatoire supérieur de Paris, in the class of Suzanne Gessner, Virgil continued his musical career abroad, invited by Géza Kapás, student of Semyon Snitkovsky, to the Franz-Liszt Academy of Music in Budapest. He then joined the class of Itzhak Rashkovsky at the Royal College of Music in London. After receiving his "Artist Diploma", he went to study with Hagai Shaham, invited by the University of Tel Aviv as part of a postdoctoral program.

He has also participated in numerous masterclasses given by violinists and pedagogues such as Ida Haendel, Zakhar Bron, Ivry Gitlis, Shlomo Mintz, Igor Oïstrakh, Haim Taub, Almita Vamos, Michèle Auclair, Olivier Charlier, Miriam Fried and Boris Kuschnir.

== Career ==
Virgil gave his first concerts at the age of 9 with the pianist Fanny Raust, a classmate and chamber music partner of Ginette Neveu. Considered a young artist "of extraordinary talent" offering "brilliant and celestial" music, Virgil regularly performs as a soloist and chamber musician in Europe and the United States. He performs in halls such as Carnegie Hall, Salle Gaveau, Théâtre des Champs-Elysées, Benaroya Hall Seattle, Harvard Club of New York, Wigmore Hall, Halle aux Grains in Toulouse, Arsenal Metz, Tel Aviv Opera House.

He has performed with the Dayton Philharmonic Orchestra, the Springfield Symphony Orchestra, the Israel Emeritus Chamber Orchestra, Sinfonia Varsovia, the Pelléas Chamber Orchestra and the Mid Atlantic Symphony Orchestra.

He has also played at major international festivals including Bowdoin Music Festival (USA), Eilat and Red Sea-Valery Gergiev (Israel), Valdres (Norway), Prussia Cove (England), Les Violons de legende, Clairvaux, Festival de La Roque-d'Anthéron, La Folle Journée, The Musical Moments of La Baule.

In the theatre, at the Festival d'Avignon in 2011, he presented a noteworthy performance, in Jean-Claude Grumberg's play "Mama's Coming Back, Poor Orphan" directed by Stéphane Valensi.

== Dedicated works ==
Virgil performs with pianists and composers Paul Cantelon and Tara Kamangar. Both have dedicated works to him:

Paul Cantelon:

- "Nocturne", created in March 2013 in Seattle with the composer and recorded with him in April 2013 in New York.
- "Neshama", a work composed in November 2016, premiered in December 2016 at Carnegie Hall, with the composer.

Tara Kamangar:

- « Once There Was and Once There Wasn't » composed in Septembre 2015 and premiered in November 2015 at Carnegie Hall with the composer and later recorded in June 2016 for Evidence Classics/Harmonia Mundi.

Drew Hemenger, American composer, also dedicated the piece "Magatama" to Virgil, which was created at Carnegie Hall in 2015.

== Collaborations ==
Since 2015, Virgil has formed the duo La Rose et La Réséda with the violinist Irène Duval.
Virgil also performs with the harpist Emmanuel Ceysson, the pianists Abdel Rahman El Bacha, Vanessa Wagner and David Aladashvili, the cellists Anne Gastinel and Camille Thomas.

== Discography ==
Incantation, released on February 21, 2020, was recorded at the Henry Wood Hall in London with the Royal Philharmonic Orchestra, conducted by Jac van Steen.

Between East and West, acclaimed by critics, was recorded in the Byzantine Hall at the Palais de Béhague in Paris with pianist Guillaume Vincent. Released on October 7, 2016 by Evidence Classics / Harmonia Mundi, the release concert was held at the Salle Gaveau. This anthology includes composers such as Chausson, Janacek, Debussy, Komitas, Bartok, Hossein, Hersant, Kamangar.

== Instruments ==
- Domenico Montagnana :

Since 2012, Virgil Boutellis-Taft has played on the Montagnana Venice 1742 Ex- Régis Pasquier, thanks to the generosity of a private patron.

- Jean-Baptiste Vuillaume :

From 2008 to 2012, he played on the violin of the French luthier Jean-Baptiste Vuillaume of 1850, copy of the Sancy, Stradivarius played by Ivry Gitlis.

== Rewards and awards ==
- Laureate of the Banque Populaire Foundation
- 1st ISA International Competition Prize, Austria
- Myra Hess Trust Award, London
- AHRC Postgraduate Award, London
- Laureate of the Bleustein-Blanchet Foundation for vocation, France
- 1st Prize of the Violin Competition Étienne Vatelot, Paris
