= Operation Breakthrough (disambiguation) =

Operation Breakthrough was a US-Soviet effort to free three gray whales from pack ice in the Beaufort Sea

Operation Breakthrough may refer also to:

- Operation Breakthrough (anti-poverty movement), an anti-poverty movement in Durham, North Carolina
- Operation Breakthrough (housing program), a program of the U.S. Department of Housing and Urban Development

== See also ==
- Breakthrough operation, an operation to create a breakthrough (military)
- Breakthrough (disambiguation)
- Operation (disambiguation)
