= Governor Romney =

Governor Romney may refer to:

- George W. Romney (1907–1995), 43rd Governor of Michigan
- Mitt Romney (born 1947), 70th Governor of Massachusetts, son of George W. Romney
