= Breakthru =

Breakthru may refer to:

== Games ==
- Breakthru (board game), a board game in the 1960s 3M Bookshelf Game Series
- BreakThru, a 1988 arcade video game by Data East
- BreakThru!, a 1994 video game by Zoo Corporation

== Albums ==
- Breakthru (Ran Blake album), a 1976 album by the jazz pianist Ran Blake
- Breakthru' (Nidji album), a 2006 album by the Indonesian pop rock band Nidji
- Breakthru (Costa album), a 2005 album by the singer-songwriter Antoniette Costa
- The Breakthru (album), a 2007 album by Afromental

== Songs ==
- "Breakthru" (song), a 1989 song by Queen
- "Breakthru'", a 1965 song by The Shadows off the album The Sound of The Shadows
- "Breakthru", a 1976 song by Ran Blake, the title song off the eponymous album Breakthru (Ran Blake album)
- "Breakthru", a 2007 House Music song by Eskalation with Sacha Williamson
- "Break Thru", a song by Natasha Bedingfield from her 2010 album Strip Me
- "Break-Thru", a song by Dirty Projectors off their 2018 album Lamp Lit Prose

== Groups, organizations ==
- BreakThru Films, a film production company
- Breakthru Beverage Group

== Other uses ==
- Break-Thru, a U.S. comics company-wide comic book crossover event in Malibu Comic's Ultraverse

== See also ==
- Breakthrough (disambiguation) (includes "Break through")
- Break (disambiguation)
- Break On Through (disambiguation), including "Break on Thru"
