= Nathaniel Rosen =

American cellist (born 1948)

- Born: June 9, 1948 (age 78); Altadena, California
- Genres: Classical
- Occupations: Cellist, instructor
- Instrument: Cello
- Years active: 1960s–present
- Labels: North Star, John Marks Records, Naxos
- Website: nathanielrosen.net

Nathaniel "Nick" Rosen (born June 9, 1948 in Altadena, California) is an American cellist, the gold medalist of the 1978 International Tchaikovsky Competition, and former faculty member at the USC Thornton School of Music and the Manhattan School of Music.

== Early life ==
Rosen grew up in a musical household, his father being an amateur violist. At the age of six, Rosen began studying with Eleonore Schoenfeld, professor of cello at the University of Southern California. At age 12, his teacher encouraged him to move on, first intending to study with Gabor Rejto; but, when it was announced that Gregor Piatigorsky was joining USC, Rosen auditioned and was welcomed into his studio and the newly created Institute for Special Musical Studies at the age of 13. Growing up, he also studied chamber music with other renowned teachers who joined Piatigorsky and the institute including Jascha Heifetz and William Primrose. He graduated from John Muir High School in the Class of 1965, and was active in the John Muir orchestra while in Grades 10, 11, and 12.

He soon, however, began to branch out into the musical profession. While a student at the University of Southern California, he became a founding member and eventually principal cellist of the Los Angeles Chamber Orchestra. He also studied with Laurence Lesser. By age 22, the same year he graduated from USC, he had also become Piatigorsky's assistant — a post he maintained for five years. In 1977, at the age of 30, he became principal cellist of the Pittsburgh Symphony Orchestra as well, under André Previn.

INathaniel Rosen won the coveted Naumburg Competition in 1977 for cello, and presented recitals in London and New York. In 1980, he was a soloist with the Naumburg Orchestral Concerts, in the Naumburg Bandshell, Central Park (NY), summer series.

== Tchaikovsky Competition ==
Although he was a finalist in the prestigious International Tchaikovsky Competition in 1966 at the age of 17, he returned in 1978 to win the Gold Medal, thrusting him into the forefront of the classical music circuit. It was however unlikely for an American candidate to win the competition, as the jury was mainly composed of Soviet cellists. The Russian cellist Daniil Shafran was the one who influenced the jury. Rosen remained, thus, the only American cellist to take first prize at the competition until Zlatomir Fung achieved the same feat in 2019.

== Today ==
He taught at the California State University, Northridge and the University of Illinois for six years. He has been a member of the faculty at the Manhattan School of Music and also enjoys engagements with the Thomas More College of Liberal Arts in Merrimack, New Hampshire and Southern Methodist University in Dallas, Texas.

He has soloed, among other orchestras, with the New York Philharmonic, Los Angeles Philharmonic, Czech Philharmonic, London Symphony Orchestra, Philadelphia Orchestra, Dresden Philharmonic Orchestra, and Leipzig Gewandhaus Orchestra. He has also played at numerous chamber festivals including the Sitka, Park City, Manchester (VT) Music Festival and Casals Festivals.

Since 2011 he lives in Japan with his Japanese wife and daughters. In 2013 he has moved from Matsuyama to Yamanakako.

His important and historical cello was crafted in 1738 by Domenico Montagnana, the "Mighty Venetian." One of the instrument's previous owners was Adrien-Francois Servais (1807–1866), the man who invented the endpin.

== Discography ==
- Nathaniel Rosen Plays Brahms with Doris Stevenson: Johannes Brahms' first and second cello sonatas, Felix Mendelssohn's "Song Without Words", and Robert Schumann's "Fantasy Pieces."
- Nathaniel Rosen In Concert performing Tchaikovsky's Rococo Variations and the First Cello Concerto by Shostakovich.
- Complete works for cello and piano of Chopin with Doris Stevenson
- Complete works for cello and piano of Schumann with Doris Stevenson
- The Bach Gamba Sonatas with Anthony Newman
- The Six Suites for Solo Cello of J.S. Bach
- Orientale - Short Pieces such as Elfentanz, Ritual Fire Dance, etc.
- Reverie - Romantic Short Pieces
- Music for a Glass Bead Game with Arturo Delmoni
- Sonatas of Prokofiev and Rachmaninoff with Pavlina Dokovska
- David Amram - Honor Song for Sitting Bull with the Manhattan Chamber Orchestra
- Saint-Saëns Concerto Live with the Camerata New York
- The Gallant Troubadour with Robert White, Samuel Sanders, Mark Peskanov, and Ransom Wilson
- Jacques Ibert Concerto for Cello and Ten Wind Instruments with the Manhattan Chamber Orchestra
