= The Concerns of a Citizen =

1968 book by George W. Romney

- Author: George W. Romney
- Language: English
- Genre: Non-fiction
- Publisher: Putnam Publishing Group
- Publication date: January 10, 1968
- Publication place: United States
- Media type: Print (Hardcover)
- Pages: 288 pp (first edition)
- ISBN: 0-399-10168-3
- OCLC: 897237
- LC Class: E839.5.R6 A5

The Concerns of a Citizen is a book written by the Governor of Michigan, George W. Romney, and published during his campaign for the 1968 Republican presidential nomination. It was published by Putnam.

== Synopsis ==
The Concerns of a Citizen is a collection of speeches and articles in which Romney expresses his opinions regarding his perceptions of moral decay, a lack of personal responsibility, the Vietnam War, and the authority of Christianity, as well as the United States Declaration of Independence and the Constitution of the United States. He focuses on segregation, housing issues, crime, the function of political parties in the United States, agriculture, and the national economy.

== Critical reception ==
A review printed in Kirkus noted that the speeches filling the book were repetitive. In particular, the reviewer commented on previous criticism of Romney for his "simplicism, confusion, and contradiction" were evident throughout the text, and was particularly critical of Romney's proposal to offer "amnesty" to the Viet Cong following a U.S. victory there. The reviewer pointed out that Romney's proposals to limit monopolies and "big labor" would require the intervention of the federal government, which Romney spent a good deal of time in the book decrying.

Keith Eubank, reviewing for Library Journal, also found the content repetitive. Eubank also commented that though it was sincere, he found it "bland" and unoriginal. Eubank stated that the speeches are "filled with platitudes", and accused Romney of fearing the federal government in his push for volunteer efforts for resolving issues of national importance. Eubank criticized Romney's advocating for private capital aiding developing nations without any economic guarantee or incentives, as well as what Eubank perceived as a lack of comment on both the Vietnam War and "our present-day racial crisis".

In contrast to Eubank's review with respect to Romney's comments on racial issues, Richard Rothstein, writing for American Prospect, and Mark Bergen, writing for Forbes, both commented in 2012 that The Concerns of a Citizen makes a great deal of eliminating segregation within cities, both racial and economic.
