= Break On Through =

Break on through or break on thru, may refer to:

- "Break On Through (To the Other Side)", a song by The Doors, 1967
- Break On Through (album), by Jeanette, 2003
- "Break on Through" (Grey's Anatomy), a 2006 television episode
- "Break on Through" (Soul Mates), a 2020 television episode
- Break on Thru: Celebration of Ray Manzarek and The Doors (film), a 2018 music film about 'The Doors'; see Ray Manzarek
- "Break On Thru, #2" (song), a cover of "Break on Through" off The Doors album Absolutely Live (The Doors album)

== See also ==
- Breakthrough (disambiguation)
- Breakthru (disambiguation)
