= George W. Romney =

American businessman and politician (1907–1995)

George Romney
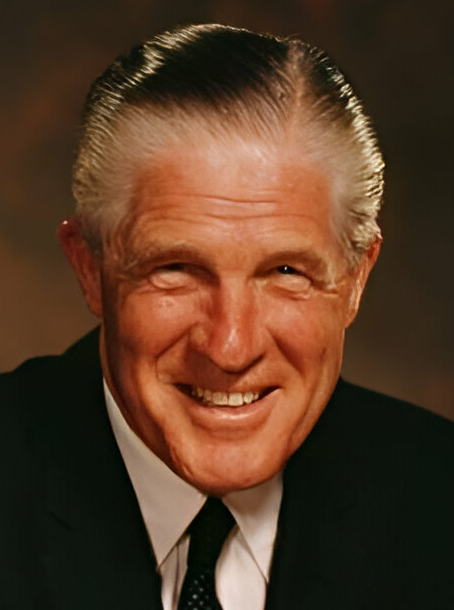
- Romney, c. 1969

3rd United States Secretary of Housing and Urban Development
- In office January 22, 1969 – January 20, 1973
- President: Richard Nixon
- Preceded by: Robert Coldwell Wood
- Succeeded by: James Thomas Lynn

43rd Governor of Michigan
- In office January 1, 1963 – January 22, 1969
- Lieutenant: T. John Lesinski; William Milliken
- Preceded by: John Swainson
- Succeeded by: William Milliken

Personal details
- Born: George Wilcken Romney; July 8, 1907 Colonia Dublán, Chihuahua, Mexico
- Died: July 26, 1995 (aged 88) Bloomfield Hills, Michigan, U.S.
- Party: Independent (before 1959); Republican (1959–1995)
- Spouse: Lenore LaFount (m. 1931)
- Children: 4, including Mitt
- Relatives: Romney family

George Wilcken Romney (July 8, 1907 – July 26, 1995) was an American businessman and politician. A member of the Republican Party, he served as chairman and president of American Motors Corporation from 1954 to 1962, the 43rd governor of Michigan from 1963 to 1969, and 3rd secretary of housing and urban development from 1969 to 1973. He was the father of Mitt Romney, who served as United States senator from Utah and as governor of Massachusetts and was the 2012 Republican presidential nominee; the husband of 1970 U.S. Senate candidate Lenore Romney; and the paternal grandfather of former Republican National Committee chair Ronna McDaniel.

Romney was born to American parents living in the polygamist Mormon colonies in Mexico; events during the Mexican Revolution forced his family to flee back to the United States when he was a child. The family lived in several states and ended up in Salt Lake City, Utah, where they struggled during the Great Depression. Romney worked in a number of jobs, served as a missionary of the Church of Jesus Christ of Latter-day Saints in the United Kingdom, and attended four colleges in the U.S. but did not graduate from any. In 1939, he moved to Detroit and joined the American Automobile Manufacturers Association, where he served as the chief spokesman for the automobile industry during World War II and headed a cooperative arrangement in which companies could share production improvements. He joined Nash-Kelvinator Corporation in 1948, and became the chief executive of its successor, American Motors, in 1954. There he turned around the struggling firm by focusing all efforts on the compact Rambler car. Romney mocked the products of the "Big Three" automakers as "gas-guzzling dinosaurs" and became one of the first high-profile, media-savvy business executives. Devoutly religious as a Latter-day Saint, he was president of the Detroit stake.

Having entered politics in 1961 by participating in a state constitutional convention to rewrite the Michigan Constitution, Romney was elected Governor of Michigan in 1962. Re-elected by increasingly large margins in 1964 and 1966, he worked to overhaul the state's financial and revenue structure, greatly expanding the size of state government and introducing Michigan's first state income tax. Romney was a strong supporter of the American Civil Rights Movement. He briefly represented moderate Republicans against conservative Republican Barry Goldwater during the 1964 U.S. presidential election. He requested the intervention of federal troops during the 1967 Detroit riot.

Initially a front runner for the Republican nomination for president of the United States in the 1968 election cycle, he proved an ineffective campaigner and fell behind Richard Nixon in polls. After a mid-1967 remark that his earlier support for the Vietnam War had been due to a "brainwashing" by U.S. military and diplomatic officials in Vietnam, his campaign faltered even more and he withdrew from the contest in early 1968. After being elected president, Nixon appointed Romney as Secretary of Housing and Urban Development. Romney's ambitious plans, which included housing production increases for the poor and open housing to desegregate suburbs, were modestly successful but often thwarted by Nixon. Romney left the administration at the start of Nixon's second term in 1973. Returning to private life, he advocated volunteerism and public service and headed the National Center for Voluntary Action and its successor organizations from 1973 through 1991. He also served as a regional representative within his church.

== Early life and background ==
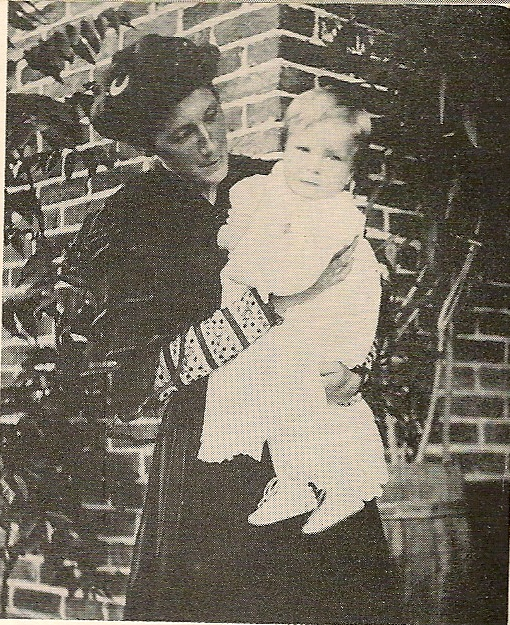
George with his mother, Anna Amelia Pratt Romney, in Mexico in 1908

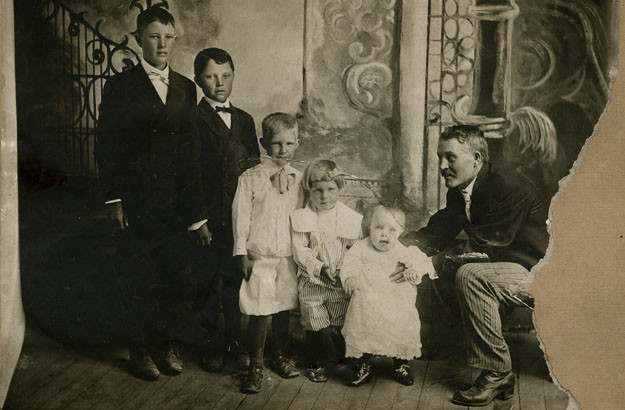
Gaskell Romney, sitting, and family, of Colonia Dublan, Chihuahua, c. 1910. Son George is fourth from the left.

Romney's grandparents were polygamous Latter-day Saints, married in 1897 (polygamy having been abolished by the 1890 Manifesto, although it persisted in places, especially Mexico), who fled the United States to Mexico with their children due to the federal government's prosecution of polygamy. His maternal grandfather was Helaman Pratt, who presided over a mission in Mexico City before moving to the Mexican state of Chihuahua. In the 1920s, Romney's uncle Rey L. Pratt played a major role in the preservation and expansion of the Latter-day Saint presence in Mexico and in its introduction to South America.

Romney's parents, Gaskell Romney and Anna Amelia Pratt, were monogamous, and United States citizens and natives of the Territory of Utah. They married in 1895 in Mexico and lived in Colonia Dublán in Nuevo Casas Grandes in the state of Chihuahua (one of the church colonies in Mexico), where George was born on July 8, 1907. George had three older brothers, two younger brothers, and a younger sister. Gaskell Romney was a successful carpenter, house builder, and farmer who headed the most prosperous family in the colony, which was situated in an agricultural valley below the Sierra Madre Occidental. The family chose U.S. citizenship for their children, including George.

The Mexican Revolution broke out in 1910 and the church's colonies were endangered in 1911–1912 by raids from marauders, including "Red Flaggers" Pascual Orozco and José Inés Salazar. Young George heard the sound of distant gunfire and saw rebels walking through the village streets. The Romney family fled and returned to the United States in July 1912, leaving their home and almost all of their property behind. Romney later said, "We were the first displaced persons of the 20th century."

In the United States, Romney grew up in humble circumstances. The family subsisted with other Latter-day Saint refugees on government relief in El Paso, Texas, benefiting from a $100,000 fund for refugees that the U.S. Congress had set up. After a few months they moved to Los Angeles, California, where Gaskell Romney worked as a carpenter. In kindergarten, other children mocked Romney's national origin by calling him "Mex".

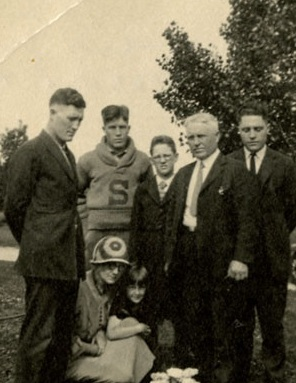
The family in Idaho in 1921, visiting the grave of George's younger brother Lawrence, who died that year of rheumatic fever. George is standing, second from left. His mother Anna is sitting on the left while his father Gaskell is standing, second from right.

In 1913, the family moved to Oakley, Idaho, and bought a farm, where they grew and subsisted largely on Idaho potatoes. The farm was not sustainable and failed when potato prices fell. The family moved to Salt Lake City, Utah, in 1916, where Gaskell Romney resumed construction work, but the family remained generally poor. In 1917, they moved to Rexburg, Idaho, where Gaskell became a successful home and commercial builder in a growing area due to high World War I commodities prices.

George started working in wheat and sugar beet fields at the age of eleven; by the sixth grade he had attended six schools. He was the valedictorian at his grammar school graduation in 1921. The Depression of 1920–1921 brought a collapse in prices, and local building was abandoned. His family returned to Salt Lake City in 1921, and while his father resumed construction work, George became skilled at lath-and-plaster work. The family was again prospering when the Great Depression hit in 1929 and ruined them. George watched his parents fail financially in Idaho and Utah and having to take a dozen years to pay off their debts. Seeing their struggles influenced his life and business career.

In Salt Lake City, Romney worked while attending Roosevelt Junior High School and, beginning in 1922, Latter-day Saints High School. There he played halfback on the football team, guard on the basketball team, and right field on the baseball team, all with more persistence than talent, but in an effort to uphold the family tradition of athleticism, he earned varsity letters in all three sports. In his senior year, he and junior Lenore LaFount became high school sweethearts; she was from a more well-assimilated Latter-day Saint family. Academically, Romney was steady but undistinguished. He graduated from high school in 1925; his yearbook picture caption was "Serious, high minded, of noble nature – a real fellow".

Partly to stay near Lenore, Romney spent the next year as a junior college student at the co-located Latter-day Saints University, where he was elected student body president. He was also president of the booster club and played on the basketball team that won the Utah–Idaho Junior College Tournament.

== Missionary work ==
After becoming an elder, Romney earned enough money working to fund himself as a missionary. In October 1926, he sailed to Great Britain and was first assigned to preach in a slum in Glasgow, Scotland. The abject poverty and hopelessness he saw there affected him greatly, but he was ineffective in gaining converts and temporarily suffered a crisis of faith.

In February 1927, he was shifted to Edinburgh and in February 1928 to London, where he kept track of mission finances. He worked under renowned Quorum of the Twelve Apostles intellectuals James E. Talmage and John A. Widtsoe; the latter's admonitions to "Live mightily today, the greatest day of all time is today" made a lasting impression on him. Romney experienced British sights and culture and was introduced to members of the peerage and the Oxford Group.

In August 1928, Romney became president of the Scottish missionary district. Operating in a whisky-centric region was difficult, and he developed a new "task force" approach of sending more missionaries to a single location at a time; this successfully drew local press attention and several hundred new recruits. Romney's frequent public proselytizing – from Edinburgh's Mound and in London from soap boxes at Speakers' Corner in Hyde Park and from a platform at Trafalgar Square – developed his gifts for debate and sales, which he would use the rest of his career. Three decades later, Romney said that his missionary time had meant more to him in developing his career than any other experience.

== Early career, marriage and children ==
Romney returned to the U.S. in late 1928 and studied briefly at the University of Utah and Ensign College. He followed LaFount to Washington, D.C., in fall 1929, after her father, Harold A. Lafount, had accepted an appointment by President Calvin Coolidge to serve on the Federal Radio Commission. He worked for Massachusetts Democratic U.S. Senator David I. Walsh during 1929 and 1930, first as a stenographer using speedwriting, then, when his abilities at that proved limited, as a staff aide working on tariffs and other legislative matters. Romney researched aspects of the proposed Smoot-Hawley tariff legislation and sat in on committee meetings; the job was a turning point in his career and gave him lifelong confidence in dealing with Congress.

With one of his brothers, Romney opened a dairy bar in nearby Rosslyn, Virginia, during this time. The business soon failed, in the midst of the Great Depression. He also attended George Washington University at night. Based upon a connection he made working for Walsh, Romney was hired as an apprentice for Alcoa in Pittsburgh in June 1930.

When LaFount, an aspiring actress, began earning bit roles in Hollywood movies, Romney arranged to be transferred to Alcoa's Los Angeles office for training as a salesman. There he took night classes at the University of Southern California. Romney did not attend for long, or graduate from, any of the colleges in which he was enrolled, accumulating only 2½ years of credits; instead he has been described as an autodidact. LaFount had the opportunity to sign a $50,000, three-year contract with Metro-Goldwyn-Mayer studios, but Romney convinced her to return to Washington with him as he was assigned a position there with Alcoa as a lobbyist. She later said she had never had a choice of both marriage and an acting career, because the latter would have upstaged him, but expressed no regrets about having chosen the former. Romney would later consider wooing her his greatest sales achievement.

The couple married on July 2, 1931, at Salt Lake City Temple. They would have four children: Margo Lynn (born 1935), Jane LaFount (born 1938), George Scott (born 1941), and Willard Mitt (born 1947). The couple's marriage reflected aspects of their personalities and courtship. George was devoted to Lenore, and tried to bring her a flower every day, often a single rose with a love note. George was also a strong, blunt personality used to winning arguments by force of will, but the more self-controlled Lenore was unintimidated and willing to push back against him. The couple quarreled so much as a result that their grandchildren would later nickname them "the Bickersons" (after the radio comedy sketches), but in the end, their closeness would allow them to settle arguments amicably.

As a lobbyist, Romney frequently competed on behalf of the aluminum industry against the copper industry, and defended Alcoa against charges of being a monopoly. He also represented the Aluminum Wares Association. In the early 1930s, he helped get aluminum windows installed in the U.S. Department of Commerce Building, at the time the largest office building in the world.

Romney joined the National Press Club and the Burning Tree and Congressional Country Clubs; one reporter watching Romney hurriedly play golf at the last said, "There is a young man who knows where he is going." Lenore's cultural refinement and hosting skills, along with her father's social and political connections, helped George in business, and the couple met the Hoovers, the Roosevelts, and other prominent Washington figures. He was chosen by Pyke Johnson, a Denver newspaperman and automotive industry trade representative he met at the Press Club, to join the newly formed Trade Association Advisory Committee to the National Recovery Administration. The committee's work continued even after the agency was declared unconstitutional in 1935. During 1937 and 1938, Romney was also president of the Washington Trade Association Executives.

== Automotive industry representative ==
After nine years with Alcoa, Romney's career had stagnated; there were many layers of executives to climb through and a key promotion he had wanted was given to someone with more seniority. Pyke Johnson was vice president of the Automobile Manufacturers Association, which needed a manager for its new Detroit office. Romney got the job and moved there with his wife and two daughters in 1939. An association study found Americans using their cars more for short trips and convinced Romney that the trend was towards more functional, basic transportation. In 1942, he was promoted to general manager of the association, a position he held until 1948. Romney also served as president of the Detroit Trade Association in 1941.

In 1940, as World War II raged overseas, Romney helped start the Automotive Committee for Air Defense, which coordinated planning between the automobile and aircraft industries. Immediately following the December 1941 attack on Pearl Harbor that drew the U.S. into the war, Romney helped turn that committee into, and became managing director of, the Automotive Council for War Production. This organization established a cooperative arrangement in which companies could share machine tools and production improvements, thus maximizing the industry's contribution to the war production effort. It embodied Romney's notion of "competitive cooperative capitalism".

With labor leader Victor Reuther, Romney led the Detroit Victory Council, which sought to improve conditions for Detroit workers under wartime stress and deal with the causes of the Detroit race riot of 1943. Romney successfully appealed to the Federal Housing Administration to make housing available to black workers near the Ford Willow Run plant. He also served on the labor-management committee of the Detroit section of the War Manpower Commission.

Romney's influence grew while he positioned himself as chief spokesman of the automobile industry, often testifying before Congressional hearings about production, labor, and management issues; he was mentioned or quoted in over 80 stories in The New York Times during this time. By war's end, 654 manufacturing companies had joined the Automotive Council for War Production, and produced nearly $29 billion in output for the Allied military forces. This included over 3 million motorized vehicles, 80 percent of all tanks and tank parts, 75 percent of all aircraft engines, half of all diesel engines, and a third of all machine guns. Between a fifth and a quarter of all U.S. wartime production was accounted for by the automotive industry.

As peacetime production began, Romney persuaded government officials to forgo complex contract-termination procedures, thus freeing auto plants to quickly produce cars for domestic consumption and avoid large layoffs. Romney was director of the American Trade Association Executives in 1944 and 1947, and managing director of the National Automobile Golden Jubilee Committee in 1946. From 1946 to 1949, he represented U.S. employers as a delegate to the Metal Trades Industry conference of the International Labor Office. By 1950, Romney was a member of the Citizens Housing and Planning Council, and criticized racial segregation in Detroit's housing program when speaking before the Detroit City Council. Romney's personality was blunt and intense, giving the impression of a "man in a hurry", and he was considered a rising star in the industry.

== American Motors Corporation chief executive ==
As managing director of the Automobile Manufacturers Association, Romney became good friends with then-president George W. Mason. When Mason became chairman of the manufacturing firm Nash-Kelvinator in 1948, he invited Romney along "to learn the business from the ground up" as his roving assistant, and the new executive spent a year working in different parts of the company. At a Detroit refrigerator plant of the Kelvinator appliance division, Romney battled the Mechanics Educational Society of America union to institute a new industrial–labor relations program that forestalled the whole facility being shut down. He appealed to the workers by saying, "I am no college man. I've laid floors, I've done lathing. I've thinned beets and shocked wheat." As Mason's protégé, Romney assumed executive assignment for the development of the Rambler.

Mason had long sought a merger of Nash-Kelvinator with one or more other companies, and on May 1, 1954, it merged with Hudson Motor Car to become the American Motors Corporation (AMC). It was the largest merger in the history of the industry, and Romney became an executive vice president of the new firm. In October 1954, Mason suddenly died of acute pancreatitis and pneumonia. Romney was named AMC's president and chairman of the board the same month.

When Romney took over, he canceled Mason's plan to merge AMC with Studebaker-Packard Corporation (or any other automaker). He reorganized upper management, brought in younger executives, and pruned and rebuilt AMC's dealer network. Romney believed that the only way to compete with the "Big Three" (General Motors, Ford, and Chrysler) was to stake the future of AMC on a new smaller-sized car line. Together with chief engineer Meade Moore, by the end of 1957 Romney had completely phased out the Nash and Hudson brands, whose sales had been lagging. The Rambler brand was selected for development and promotion, as AMC pursued an innovative strategy: manufacturing only compact cars. The company struggled badly at first, losing money in 1956, more in 1957, and experiencing defections from its dealer network. Romney instituted company-wide savings and efficiency measures, and he and other executives reduced their salaries by up to 35 percent. In sticking with his decision to focus on smaller cars, Romney exhibited a stubbornness that was common across several generations of Romneys.

Though AMC was on the verge of being taken over by corporate raider Louis Wolfson in 1957, Romney was able to fend him off. Then sales of the Rambler finally took off, leading to unexpected financial success for AMC. It posted its first quarterly profit in three years in 1958, was the only car company to show increased sales during the recession of 1958, and moved from thirteenth to seventh place among worldwide auto manufacturers. In contrast with the Hudson's NASCAR racing success in the early 1950s, the Ramblers were frequent winners in the coast-to-coast Mobil Economy Run, an annual event on U.S. highways. Sales remained strong during 1960 and 1961; the Rambler was America's third most popular car both years.

A believer in "competitive cooperative consumerism", Romney was effective in his frequent appearances before Congress. He discussed what he saw as the twin evils of "big labor" and "big business", and called on Congress to break up the Big Three. As the Big Three automakers introduced ever-larger models, AMC undertook a "gas-guzzling dinosaur fighter" strategy, and Romney became the company spokesperson in print advertisements, public appearances, and commercials on the Disneyland television program. Known for his fast-paced, short-sleeved management style that ignored organizational charts and levels of responsibility, he often wrote the ad copy himself.

Romney became what automotive writer Joe Sherman termed "a folk hero of the American auto industry" and one of the first high-profile media-savvy business executives. His focus on small cars as a challenge to AMC's domestic competitors, as well as the foreign-car invasion, was documented in the April 6, 1959, cover story of Time magazine, which concluded that "Romney has brought off singlehanded one of the most remarkable selling jobs in U.S. industry." A full biography of him was published in 1960; the company's resurgence made Romney a household name. The Associated Press named Romney its Man of the Year in Industry for four consecutive years, 1958 through 1961.

The company's stock rose from $7 per share to $90 per share, making Romney a millionaire from stock options. However, whenever he felt his salary and bonus was excessively high for a year, he gave the excess back to the company. After initial wariness, he developed a good relationship with United Automobile Workers leader Walter Reuther, and AMC workers also benefited from a then-novel profit-sharing plan. Romney was one of only a few Michigan corporate chiefs to support passage and implementation of the state Fair Employment Practices Act.

== Local church and civic leadership ==
Religion was a paramount force in Romney's life. In a 1959 essay for the Detroit Free Press he said, "My religion is my most precious possession. ... Except for my religion, I easily could have become excessively occupied with industry, social and recreational activities. Sharing personal responsibility for church work with my fellow members has been a vital counterbalance in my life." Following Church practices, he did not drink alcohol or caffeinated beverages, smoke, or swear. His favorite piece of Latter-day Saint scripture was from the Doctrine and Covenants: "Search diligently, pray always, and be believing, and all things shall work together for your good." Romney and his wife paid tithing, and from 1955 to 1965, gave 19 percent of their income to the church and another 4 percent to charity.

Romney was a high priest in the Melchizedek priesthood, and beginning in 1944 he headed the Detroit church branch (which initially was small enough to meet in a member's house). By the time he was AMC chief, he presided over the Detroit stake, which included not only all of Metro Detroit, Ann Arbor, and the Toledo area of Ohio but also the western edge of Ontario along the Michigan border. In this role, Romney oversaw the religious work of some 2,700 church members, occasionally preached sermons, and supervised the construction of the first stake tabernacle east of the Mississippi River in 100 years. Because the stake covered part of Canada, he often interacted with Canadian Mission President Thomas S. Monson. Romney's rise to a leadership role in the church reflected the church's journey from a fringe pioneer religion to one that was closely associated with mainstream American business and values. According to Richard and Joan Ostling, due in part to the prominence of George Romney, the larger Romney family would be viewed as Latter-day Saint royalty.

Romney and his family lived in affluent Bloomfield Hills, having moved there from Detroit around 1953. He became deeply active in Michigan civic affairs. He was on the board of directors of the Children's Hospital of Michigan and the United Foundation of Detroit, and was chairman of the executive committee of the Detroit Round Table of Catholics, Jews, and Protestants. In 1959, he received the Anti-Defamation League of B'nai B'rith's Americanism award.

Starting in 1956, Romney headed a citizen-based committee for improved educational programs in Detroit's public schools. The 1958, final report of the Citizens Advisory Committee on School Needs was largely Romney's work and received considerable public attention; it made nearly 200 recommendations for economy and efficiency, better teacher pay, and new infrastructure funding. Romney helped a $90-million education-related bond issue and tax increase win an upset victory in an April 1959 statewide referendum. He organized Citizens for Michigan in 1959, a nonpartisan group that sought to study Detroit's problems and build an informed electorate. Citizens for Michigan built on Romney's belief that assorted interest groups held too much influence in government, and that only the cooperation of informed citizens acting for the benefit of all could counter them.

Based on his fame and accomplishments in a state where automobile making was a central topic of conversation, Romney was seen as a natural to enter politics. He first became directly involved in politics in 1959, when he was a key force in the petition drive calling for a constitutional convention to rewrite the Michigan Constitution. Romney's sales skills made Citizens for Michigan one of the most effective organizations among those calling for the convention. Previously unaffiliated politically, Romney declared himself a member of the Republican Party and gained election to the convention. By early 1960, many in Michigan's somewhat moribund Republican Party were touting Romney as a possible candidate for governor, U.S. senator, or even U.S. vice president.

Also in early 1960, Romney served on the Fair Campaign Practices Committee, a group also having Jewish, Catholic, mainline and evangelical Protestant, and Orthodox Christian members. It issued a report whose guiding principles were that no candidate for elected office should be supported or opposed due to their religion and that no campaign for office should be seen as an opportunity to vote for one religion against another. This statement helped pave the way for John F. Kennedy's famous speech on religion and public office later that year. Romney briefly considered a run in the 1960 Senate election, but instead became a vice president of the constitutional convention that revised the Michigan constitution during 1961 and 1962.

== Governor of Michigan ==
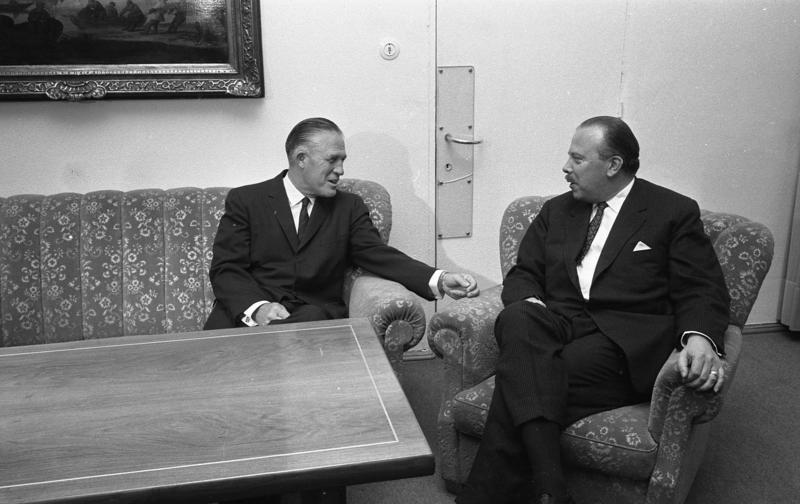
Governor Romney meeting with German Secretary of State Freiherr von Guttenberg in December 1967

After a period of pained indecision and a 24-hour prayer fast, Romney stepped down from AMC in February 1962 to enter electoral politics (given an indefinite leave of absence, he was succeeded as president of AMC by Roy Abernethy). Romney's position as the leader of the moderate Republicans at the constitutional convention helped gain him the Republican nomination for governor of Michigan. He ran against the incumbent Democratic Governor John B. Swainson in the general election. Romney campaigned on revising the state's tax structure, increasing its appeal to businesses and the general public, and getting it "rolling again". Romney decried both the large influence of labor unions within the Democratic Party and the similarly large influence of big business within the Republican Party. His campaign was among the first to exploit the capabilities of electronic data processing.

Romney won by some 80,000 votes and ended a fourteen-year stretch of Democratic rule in the state executive spot. His win was attributed to his appeal to independent voters and to those from the increasingly influential suburbs of Detroit, who by 1962 were more likely to vote Republican than the heavily Democratic residents of the city itself. Additionally, Romney had found a level of support among labor union members that was unusual for a Republican. Democrats won all the other statewide executive offices in the election, including Democratic incumbent T. John Lesinski in the separate election for lieutenant governor of Michigan. Romney's success caused immediate mention of him as a presidential possibility for 1964, and President John F. Kennedy said privately in 1963 that, "The one fellow I don't want to run against is Romney."

Romney was sworn in as governor on January 1, 1963. His initial concern was the implementation of the overhaul of the state's financial and revenue structure that had been authorized by the constitutional convention. In 1963, he proposed a comprehensive tax revision package that included a flat-rate state income tax, but general economic prosperity alleviated pressure on the state budget and the Michigan Legislature rejected the measure. Romney's early difficulties with the legislature helped undermine an attempted push that year of Romney as a national political figure by former Richard Nixon associates. One Michigan Democrat said of Romney, "He has not yet learned that things in government are not necessarily done the moment the man at the top gives an order. He is eager and sometimes impatient." But over his first two years in office, Romney was able to work with Democrats – who often had at least partial control of the legislature – and an informal bipartisan coalition formed which allowed Romney to accomplish many of his goals and initiatives.

Romney held a series of Governor's Conferences, which sought to find new ideas from public services professionals and community activists who attended. He opened his office in the Michigan State Capitol to visitors, spending five minutes with every citizen who wanted to speak with him on Thursday mornings, and was always sure to shake the hands of schoolchildren visiting the capitol. He almost always eschewed political activities on Sunday, which he considered the Sabbath. His blunt and unequivocal manner sometimes caused friction, and family members and associates used the idiom "bull in a china shop" to describe him. He took a theatrical approach to governance, staging sudden appearances in settings where he might be politically unwelcome. One former aide later said that willful was too weak a word to describe him, and chose messianic instead. Romney saw a moral dimension in every issue and his political views were held with as much fervor as religious ones; writer Theodore H. White said "the first quality that surfaced, as one met and talked with George Romney over a number of years, was a sincerity so profound that, in conversation, one was almost embarrassed."

Romney supported the American Civil Rights Movement while governor. Although he belonged to a church that did not allow black people in its lay clergy, Romney's hardscrabble background and subsequent life experiences led him to support the movement. He reflected, "It was only after I got to Detroit that I got to know Negroes and began to be able to evaluate them and I began to recognize that some Negroes are better and more capable than lots of whites." During his first State of the State address in January 1963, Romney declared that "Michigan's most urgent human rights problem is racial discrimination—in housing, public accommodations, education, administration of justice, and employment." Romney helped create the state's first civil rights commission.

The governor (shirt sleeves) walking in the first rank of an NAACP march, 600-strong, in protest of housing discrimination, June 1963

When Martin Luther King Jr. came to Detroit in June 1963 and led the 120,000-strong Great March on Detroit, Romney designated the occasion Freedom March Day in Michigan, and sent state senator Stanley Thayer to march with King as his emissary, but did not attend himself because it was on Sunday. Romney did participate in a much smaller march protesting housing discrimination the following Saturday in Grosse Pointe, after King had left.

Romney supported the Civil Rights Act of 1964 then under consideration by Congress, and his support for it and advocacy of civil rights, in general, brought him criticism from some in his own church. In January 1964, Quorum of the Twelve Apostles member Delbert L. Stapley wrote him that a proposed civil rights bill was "vicious legislation" and told him that "the Lord had placed the curse upon the Negro" and men should not seek its removal. Romney refused to change his position and increased his efforts towards civil rights. Regarding the church policy itself, Romney was among those liberal who hoped the church leadership would revise the theological interpretation that underlay it, but Romney did not believe in publicly criticizing the church, subsequently saying that fellow Latter-day Saint Stewart Udall's 1967 published denunciation of the policy "cannot serve any useful religious purpose".

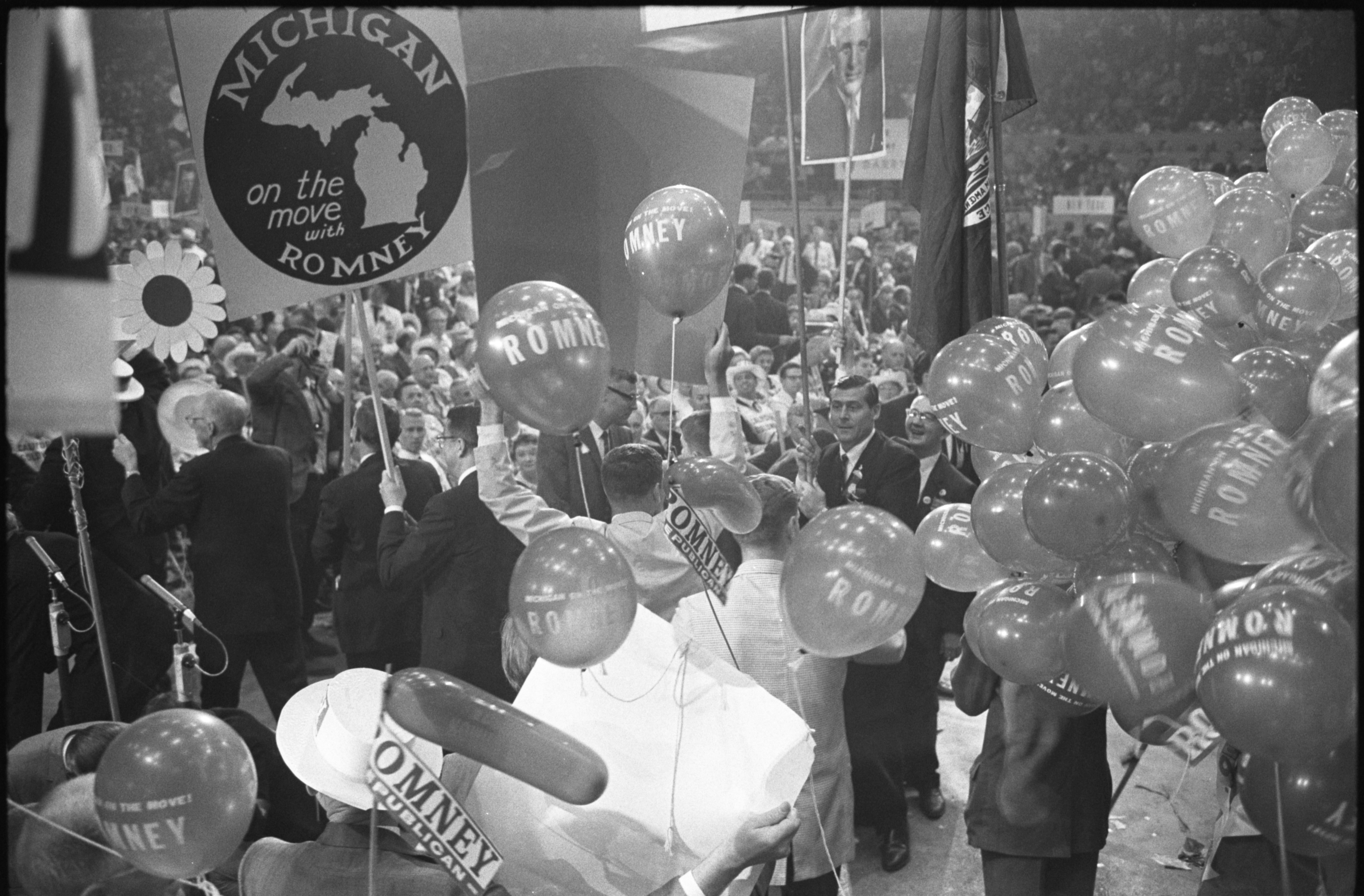
Delegates hold signs and balloons supporting the Michigan governor as a favorite son at the 1964 Republican National Convention

In the 1964 U.S. presidential election, Senator Barry Goldwater quickly became the likely Republican Party nominee. Goldwater represented a new wave of American conservatism, of which the moderate Romney was not a part. Romney also felt that Goldwater would be a drag on Republicans running in all the other races that year, including Romney's own (at the time, Michigan had two-year terms for its governor). Finally, Romney disagreed strongly with Goldwater's views on civil rights; he would later say, "Whites and Negroes, in my opinion, have got to learn to know each other. Barry Goldwater didn't have any background to understand this, to fathom them, and I couldn't get through to him." Romney declared at a dinner held in his honor at Salt Lake City that by appealing to the Southerners who supported racial segregation in order to win the presidency, the Republican Party would forever lose its association as the party of Abraham Lincoln.

During the June 1964 National Governors' Conference, 13 of 16 Republican governors present were opposed to Goldwater; their leaders were Jim Rhodes of Ohio, Nelson Rockefeller of New York (whose own campaign had just stalled out with a loss to Goldwater in the California primary), William Scranton of Pennsylvania, and Romney. In an unusual appearance at a Sunday press conference, Romney declared that the nomination of Goldwater could lead to the "suicidal destruction of the Republican Party", and that "If [Goldwater's] views deviate as indicated from the heritage of our party, I will do everything within my power to keep him from becoming the party's presidential nominee." Romney had, however, previously vowed to Michigan voters that he would not run for president in 1964. Detroit newspapers indicated they would not support him in any such bid, and Romney quickly decided to honor his pledge to stay out of the contest. Scranton entered instead, but Goldwater prevailed decisively at the 1964 Republican National Convention. Romney's name was entered into nomination as a favorite son by U.S. Representative Gerald Ford of Michigan (who had not wanted to choose between candidates during the primary campaign) and he received the votes of 41 delegates in the roll call (40 of Michigan's 48 and one from Kansas).

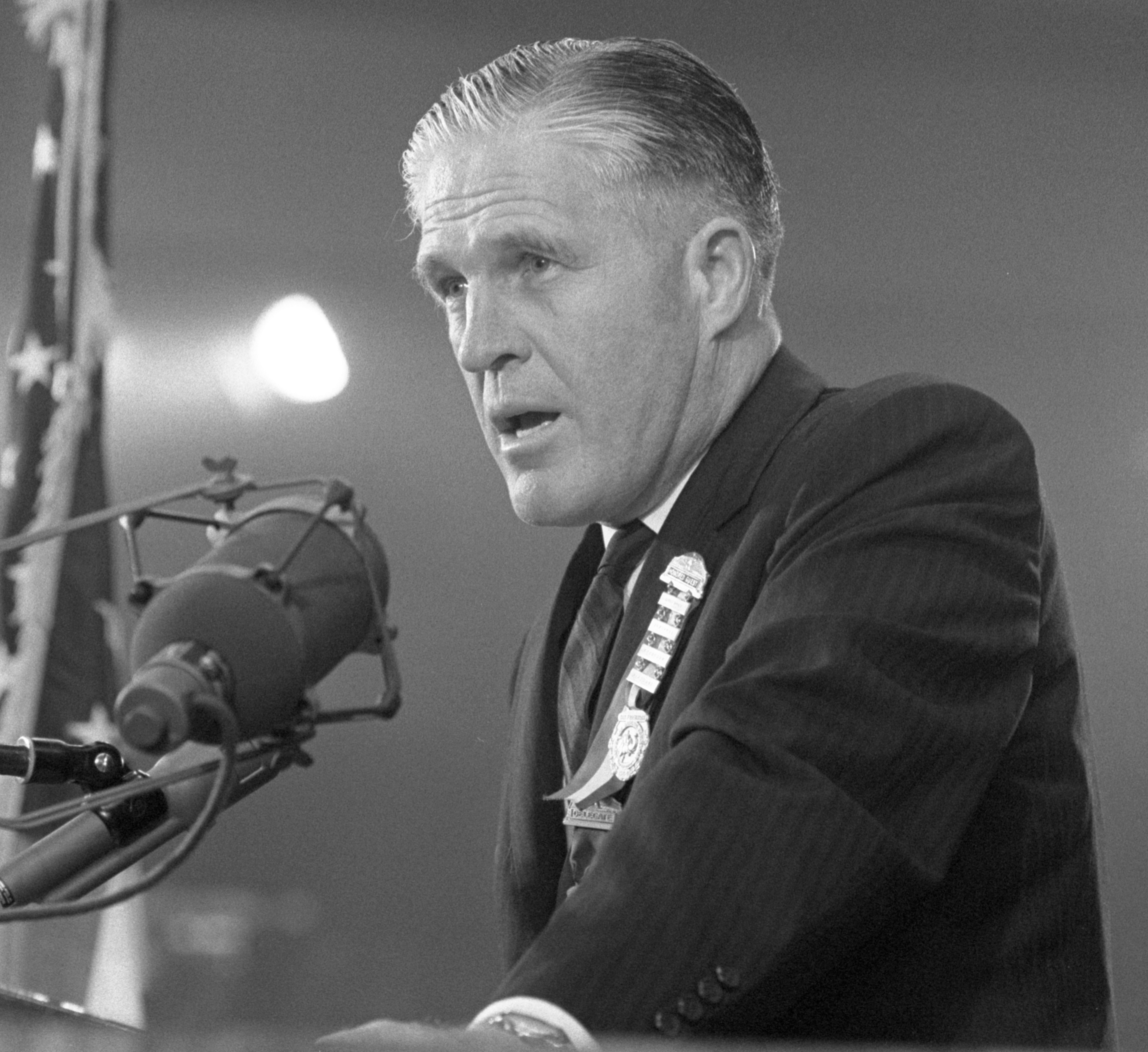
Romney speaking at the 1964 Republican National Convention

At the convention, Romney fought for a strengthened civil rights plank in the party platform that would pledge action to eliminate discrimination at the state, local, and private levels, but it was defeated on a voice vote. He also failed to win support for a statement that condemned both left- and right-wing extremism without naming any organizations, which lost a standing vote by a two-to-one margin. Both of Romney's positions were endorsed by former President Dwight Eisenhower, who had an approach to civic responsibilities similar to Romney's. As the convention concluded, Romney neither endorsed nor repudiated Goldwater and vice presidential nominee William E. Miller, saying he had reservations about Goldwater's lack of support for civil rights and the political extremism that Goldwater embodied.

For the fall 1964 elections, Romney cut himself off from the national ticket, refusing to even appear on the same stage with them and continuing to feud with Goldwater privately. He campaigned for governor in mostly Democratic areas, and when pressed at campaign appearances about whether he supported Goldwater, he replied, "You know darn well I'm not!" Romney was re-elected in 1964 by a margin of over 380,000 votes over Democratic Congressman Neil Staebler, despite Goldwater's landslide defeat to President Lyndon B. Johnson that swept away many other Republican candidates. Romney won 15 percent of Michigan's black vote, compared to Goldwater's two percent.

In 1965, Romney visited South Vietnam for 31 days and said that he was continuing his strong support for U.S. military involvement there. During 1966, while son Mitt was away in France on missionary work, George Romney guided Mitt's fiancée Ann Davies as a convert to the Church. Governor Romney continued his support of civil rights; after violence broke out during the Selma to Montgomery marches in 1965, he marched at the front of a Detroit parade in solidarity with the marchers. In 1966, Romney had his biggest electoral success, winning re-election again by some 527,000 votes over Democratic lawyer Zolton Ferency (this time to a four-year term, after a change in Michigan law). His share of the black vote rose to over 30 percent, a virtually unprecedented accomplishment for a Republican.

By 1967, a looming deficit prompted the legislature to overhaul Michigan's tax structure. Personal and corporate state income taxes were created while business receipts and corporation franchise taxes were eliminated. Passage of an income levy had eluded past Michigan governors, no matter which party controlled of the legislature. Romney's success convincing Democratic and Republican factions to compromise on the details of the measure was considered a key test of his political ability.

The massive 12th Street riot in Detroit began during the predawn hours of July 23, 1967, precipitated by a police raid of a speakeasy in a predominantly black neighborhood. As the day wore on and looting and fires got worse, Romney called in the Michigan State Police and the Michigan National Guard. At 3 a.m. on July 24, Romney and Detroit Mayor Jerome Cavanagh called U.S. Attorney General Ramsey Clark and requested that federal troops be sent. Clark indicated that to do so, Romney would have to declare a state of civil insurrection, which the governor was loath to do from fear that insurance companies would seize upon it as a reason to not cover losses owing to the riot. Elements of the 82nd and 101st U.S. Army Airborne Divisions were mobilized outside of the city. As the situation in Detroit worsened, Romney told Deputy Secretary of Defense Cyrus Vance, "We gotta move, man, we gotta move." Near midnight on July 24, President Johnson authorized thousands of paratroopers to enter Detroit. Johnson went on national television to announce his actions and made seven references to Romney's inability to control the riot using state and local forces. Thousands of arrests took place and the rioting continued until July 27. The final toll was the largest of any American civil disturbance in fifty years: forty-three dead, over a thousand injured, 2,500 stores looted, hundreds of homes burned, and some $50 million overall in property damage.

There were strong political implications in the handling of the riot, as Romney was seen as a leading Republican contender to challenge Johnson's presidential re-election the following year; Romney believed the White House had intentionally slowed its response and he charged Johnson with having "played politics" in his actions. The riot notwithstanding, by the end of Romney's governorship the state had made strong gains in civil rights related to public employment, government contracting, and access to public accommodations. Lesser improvements were made in combating discrimination in private employment, housing, education, and law enforcement. Considerable state and federal efforts were made during this time to improve the situation of Michigan's migrant farm workers and Native Americans, without much progress for either.

Of the assassination of Martin Luther King Jr. on April 4, 1968, Romney said it was "a great national tragedy at a time when we need aggressive nonviolent leadership to peacefully achieve equal rights, equal opportunities and equal responsibilities for all. This is indeed a cause for general mourning and rededicated effort by everyone to eliminate racial prejudice in all of its ugly and repressive forms." The King assassination riots affected many cities across the United States over the next few days. There was some rioting in Detroit and Romney ordered the National Guard deployed and imposed a curfew; but the situation was calmer there than in the worst-affected cities and much less violent than the 1967 riots had been. Romney and his wife Lenore attended the funeral of King on April 9.

Romney greatly expanded the size of state government while governor. His first state budget, for fiscal year 1963, was $550 million, a $20 million increase over that of his predecessor Swainson. Romney had also inherited an $85 million budget deficit, but left office with a surplus. In the following fiscal years, the state budget increased to $684 million for 1964, $820 million for 1965, $1 billion for 1966, $1.1 billion for 1967, and was proposed as $1.3 billion for 1968. Romney led the way for a large increase in state spending on education, and Michigan began to develop one of the nation's most comprehensive systems of higher education. There was a significant increase in funding support for local governments and there were generous benefits for the poor and unemployed. Romney's spending was enabled by the post–World War II economic expansion that generated continued government surpluses and by a consensus of both parties in Michigan to maintain extensive state bureaucracies and expand public sector services. During his time as governor, Romney also signed the Public Employment Relations Act, which granted collective bargaining rights for public sector employees, reduced strike-related penalties to public employees, and prevented agencies from engaging in unfair practices against unions. It was one of the first state laws in the country that obligated governmental entities to negotiate with public employee unions.

The bipartisan coalitions that Romney worked with in the state legislature enabled him to reach most of his legislative goals. His record as governor continued his reputation for having, as White said, "a knack for getting things done". Noted University of Michigan historian Sidney Fine assessed him as "a highly successful governor".

== 1968 presidential campaign ==
Romney's wide margin of re-election as governor in November 1966 thrust him to the forefront of national Republicans. In addition to his political record, the tall, square-jawed, handsome, graying Romney matched what the public thought a president should look like. His voice, with its reverbating cadences and Midwestern accent, was also an asset. Republican governors were determined not to let a Goldwater-sized loss recur, and neither Rockefeller nor Scranton wanted to run again; the governors quickly settled on Romney as their favorite for the Republican presidential nomination in the 1968 U.S. presidential election.

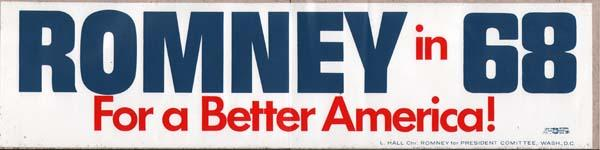
Romney campaign bumper sticker

Former Congressman and Republican National Committee chair Leonard Hall became Romney's informal campaign manager. A Gallup Poll after the November elections showed Romney as favored among Republicans over former Vice President Richard Nixon for the Republican nomination, 39 percent to 31 percent; a Harris Poll showed Romney besting President Johnson among all voters by 54 percent to 46 percent. Nixon considered Romney his chief opponent. Romney announced an exploratory phase for a possible campaign in February 1967, beginning with a visit to Alaska and the Rocky Mountain states.

Romney's greatest weakness was a lack of foreign policy expertise and a need for a clear position on the Vietnam War. The press coverage of the trip focused on Vietnam, and reporters were frustrated by Romney's initial reluctance to speak about it. The qualities that helped Romney as an industry executive worked against him as a presidential candidate; he had difficulty being articulate, often speaking at length and too forthrightly on a topic and then later correcting himself while maintaining he was not changing what he had said. Reporter Jack Germond joked that he was going to add a single key on his typewriter that would print, "Romney later explained ..." Life magazine wrote that Romney "manages to turn self-expression into a positive ordeal" and that he was no different in private: "nobody can sound more like the public George Romney than the real George Romney let loose to ramble, inevitably away from the point and toward some distant moral precept." Romney had the image of a do-gooder and reporters began to refer to him as "Saint George".

The perception grew that Romney was gaffe-prone. The campaign, beset by internal rivalries, soon went through the first of several reorganizations. By then, Nixon had already overtaken Romney in Gallup's Republican preference poll, a lead he would hold throughout the rest of the campaign. The techniques that had brought Romney victories in Michigan, such as operating outside established partisan formulas and keeping a distance from Republican Party organizational elements, proved ineffective in a party nominating contest.

Romney's poll numbers
Date	Percentage	Margin
November 1966	39%	+8
January 1967	28%	–11
February 1967	31%	–10
March 1967	30%	–9
April 1967	28%	–15
June 1967	25%	–14
August 1967	24%	–11
September 1967	14%	–26
October 1967	13%	–29
November 1967	14%	–28
January 1968	12%	–30
February 1968	7%	–44
Gallup Poll percentages of Republican Party voters preferring Romney for the presidential nomination, and margin ahead or behind usual poll leader Richard Nixon. Romney was trailing almost from the start, and his numbers dropped further after the August 31, 1967, "brainwashing" remark.

Romney's national poll ratings continued to erode, and by May he had lost his edge over Johnson. The Detroit riots of July 1967 did not change his standing among Republicans, but did give him a bounce in national polls against the increasingly unpopular president.

Questions were occasionally asked about Romney's eligibility to run for U.S. president owing to his birth in Mexico, given the ambiguity in the United States Constitution over the phrase "natural-born citizen". Romney would depart the race before the matter could be more definitively resolved, although the preponderance of opinion then and since has been that he was eligible.

Romney was also the first Latter-day Saint to stage a credible run for the presidency. By this time, he was well known as a Latter-day Saint, especially through profiles in national magazines dating back to his years in business. Making him perhaps the most nationally visible Latter-day Saint since Brigham Young. However, his membership as a member of the Church was not heavily mentioned during the campaign. What indirect discussion there was helped bring to national attention the church's policy regarding blacks, but the contrast of Romney's pro-civil rights stance deflected any criticism of him and indirectly benefited the image of the church. Some historians and Latter-day Saints suspected then and later that had Romney's campaign lasted longer and been more successful, his religion might have become a more prominent issue. Romney's campaign did often focus on his core beliefs; a Romney billboard in New Hampshire read

"The Way To Stop Crime Is To Stop Moral Decay". Dartmouth College students gave a bemused reaction to his morals message, displaying signs such as "God Is Alive and Thinks He's George Romney". A spate of books were published about Romney, more than for any other candidate, and included a friendly campaign biography, an attack from a former staffer, and a collection of Romney's speeches.

On August 31, 1967, in a taped interview with locally influential (and nationally syndicated) talk show host Lou Gordon of WKBD-TV in Detroit, Romney stated: "When I came back from Viet Nam [in November 1965], I'd just had the greatest brainwashing that anybody can get." He then shifted to opposing the war: "I no longer believe that it was necessary for us to get involved in South Vietnam to stop Communist aggression in Southeast Asia." Decrying the "tragic" conflict, he urged "a sound peace in South Vietnam at an early time". Thus Romney disavowed the war and reversed himself from his earlier stated belief that the war was "morally right and necessary".

The "brainwashing" reference had been an offhand, unplanned remark that came at the end of a long, behind-schedule day of campaigning. By September 7, it found its way into prominence at The New York Times. Eight other governors who had been on the same 1965 trip as Romney said no such activity had taken place, and one of them, Philip H. Hoff of Vermont, said Romney's remarks were "outrageous, kind of stinking ... Either he's a most naïve man or he lacks judgment." The overtones of brainwashing, following the experiences of American prisoners of war (highlighted by the 1962 film The Manchurian Candidate), made Romney's comment devastating, especially as it reinforced the negative image of Romney's abilities that had already developed. The topic of brainwashing quickly became the subject of critical newspaper editorials, as well as television talk show fodder, and Romney bore the brunt of the topical humor. Senator Eugene McCarthy, running against Johnson for the Democratic nomination, said that in Romney's case, "a light rinse would have been sufficient." Republican Congressman Robert T. Stafford of Vermont sounded a common concern: "If you're running for the presidency, you are supposed to have too much on the ball to be brainwashed." After the remark was aired, Romney's poll ratings nosedived, going from 11 percent behind Nixon to 26 percent behind.

He nonetheless persevered, staging a three-week, 17-city tour of the nation's ghettos and disadvantaged areas that none of his advisors thought politically worthwhile. He sought to engage militants in dialogue, found himself exposed to the harsh realities and language of ghetto areas, and had an unusual encounter with hippies and the Diggers in San Francisco's Haight-Ashbury.

Romney formally announced on November 18, 1967, at Detroit's Veterans Memorial Building, that he had "decided to fight for and win the Republican nomination and election to the Presidency of the United States". His subsequent release of his federal tax returns – twelve years' worth going back to his time as AMC head – was groundbreaking and established a precedent that many future presidential candidates would have to contend with. He spent the following months campaigning tirelessly, focusing on the New Hampshire primary, the first of the season, and doing all the on-the-ground activities known to that state: greeting workers at factory gates before dawn, having neighborhood meetings in private homes, and stopping at bowling alleys. He returned to Vietnam in December 1967 and made speeches and proposals on the subject, one of which presaged Nixon's eventual policy of Vietnamization. For a while, he got an improved response from voters.

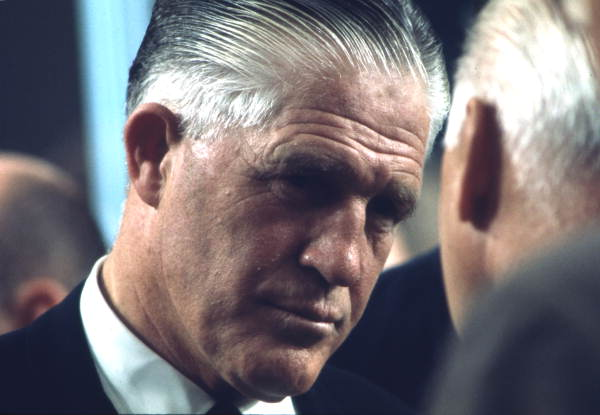
Romney at the 1968 Republican National Convention

Two weeks before the March 12 primary, an internal poll showed Romney losing to Nixon by a six-to-one margin in New Hampshire. Rockefeller, seeing the poll result as well, publicly maintained his support for Romney but said he would be available for a draft; the statement made national headlines and embittered Romney (who would later claim it was Rockefeller's entry, and not the "brainwashing" remark, that doomed him). Seeing his cause was hopeless, Romney announced his withdrawal as a presidential candidate on February 28, 1968. Romney wrote his son Mitt, still away on missionary work: "Your mother and I are not personally distressed. As a matter of fact, we are relieved. ... I aspired, and though I achieved not, I am satisfied."

Nixon went on to gain the nomination. At the 1968 Republican National Convention in Miami Beach, Romney refused to release his delegates to Nixon, something Nixon did not forget. Romney finished a weak fifth, with only 50 votes on the roll call (44 of Michigan's 48, plus six of Utah's eight). When party liberals and moderates and others expressed dismay at Nixon's choice of Spiro Agnew as his running mate, Romney's name was placed into nomination for vice president by Mayor of New York John Lindsay and pushed by several delegations. Romney said he did not initiate the move, but he made no effort to oppose it. Nixon saw the rebellion as a threat to his leadership and actively fought against it; Romney lost to Agnew 1,119–186. Romney, however, worked for Nixon's eventually successful campaign in the fall, which did earn him Nixon's gratitude.

Presidential historian Theodore H. White wrote that during his campaign Romney gave "the impression of an honest and decent man simply not cut out to be President of the United States". Governor Rhodes more memorably said, "Watching George Romney run for the presidency was like watching a duck try to make love to a football."

== Secretary of Housing and Urban Development ==
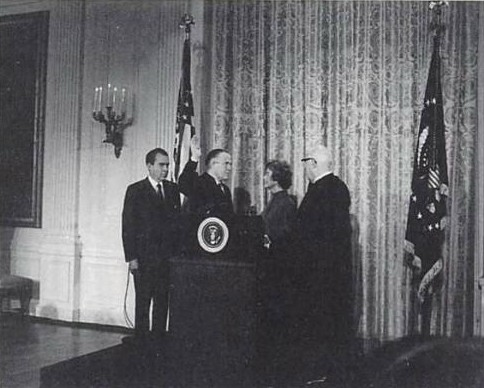
Romney was sworn in as secretary of Housing and Urban Development on January 22, 1969, with President Richard Nixon and wife Lenore Romney at his side.

After the election, Nixon named Romney to be secretary of Housing and Urban Development (HUD). The president-elect made the announcement as part of a nationally televised presentation of his new cabinet on December 11, 1968. Nixon praised Romney for his "missionary zeal" and said that he would also be tasked with mobilizing volunteer organizations to fight poverty and disease within the United States. In actuality, Nixon distrusted Romney politically, and appointed him to a liberally oriented, low-profile federal agency partly to appease Republican moderates and partly to reduce Romney's potential to challenge for the 1972 Republican presidential nomination.

Romney was confirmed by the Senate without opposition on January 20, 1969, the day of Nixon's inauguration, and was sworn into office on January 22, with Nixon at his side. Romney resigned as governor that same day, and was succeeded by his lieutenant governor, William G. Milliken. Milliken continued Romney's model of downplaying party label and ideology, and Republicans held onto the governorship for three more terms until 1983, though Michigan was one of the nation's most blue-collar states.

As secretary, Romney conducted the first reorganization of the department since its 1966 creation. The changes were intended to make the department more business-like with fewer independent bureaucracies. His November, 1969 plan brought programs with similar functions together under unified, policy-based administration at the Washington level, and created two new assistant secretary positions. At the same time, he increased the number of regional and area offices and decentralized program operations and locality-based decisions to them, moves that were in keeping with Nixon's "New Federalism". In particular, the Federal Housing Administration underwent wholesale changes to make it less autonomous. During his tenure, Romney believed his reorganization made the department more efficient and able to withstand some, but not all, of the budget cuts that Nixon imposed on it.

The Fair Housing Act of 1968 mandated a federal commitment towards housing desegregation, and required HUD to orient its programs in this direction. Romney, filled with moral passion, wanted to address the widening economic and geographic gulf between whites and blacks by moving blacks out of inner-city ghettos into suburbs. Romney proposed an open housing scheme to facilitate desegregation, dubbed "Open Communities"; HUD planned it for many months without keeping Nixon informed.

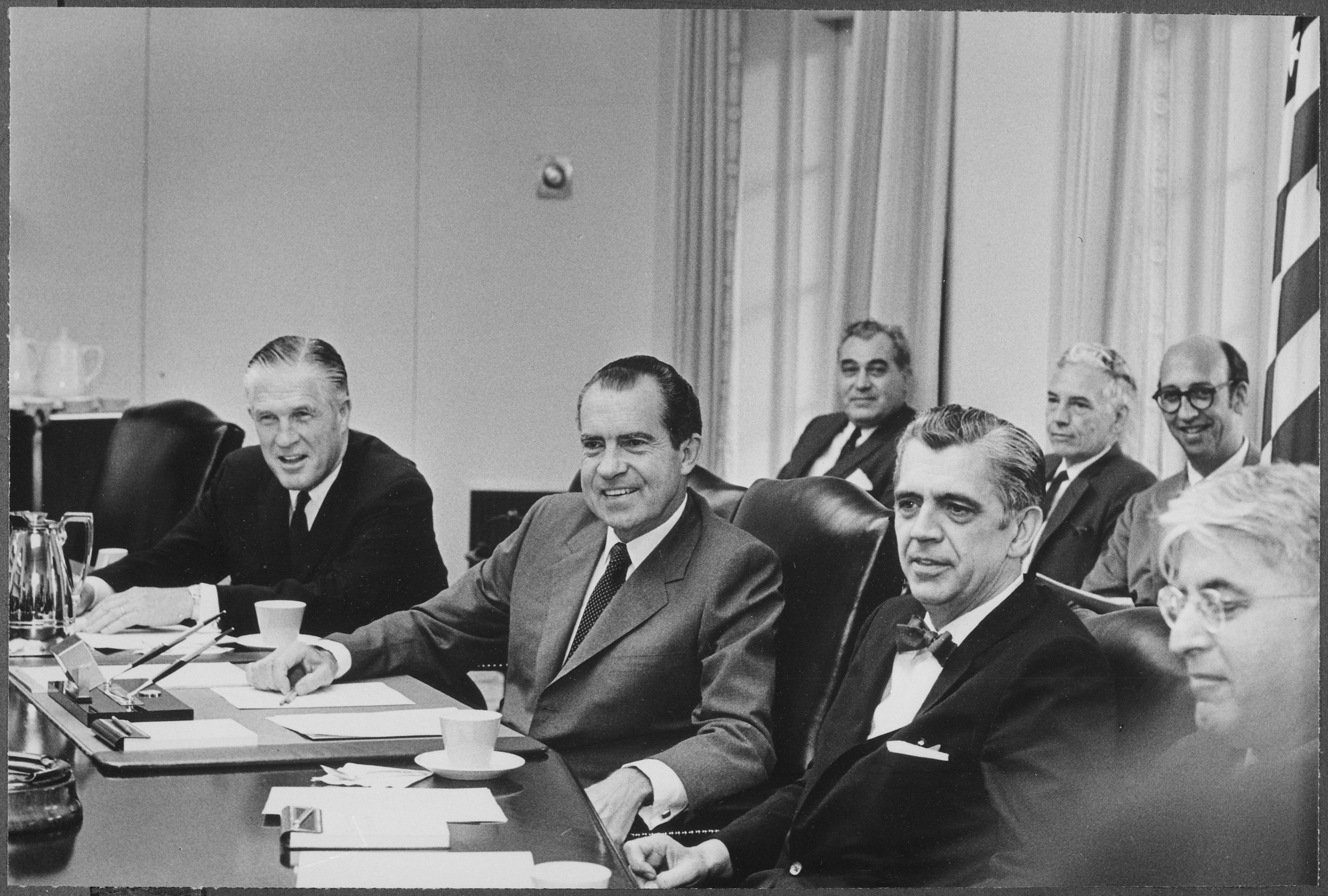
Romney with Nixon at a Cabinet meeting in 1969

When the open housing proposal became public, local reaction was often hostile. Such was the reaction of many residents in Warren, Michigan, a predominately white blue-collar suburb of Detroit. While it had no formal discriminatory laws, most blacks were excluded by zoning practices, refusals to sell to them, and intimidatory actions of white property owners, many of whom were ethnic Polish and Catholic and had moved to the suburb as part of white flight. By this time, Detroit was 40–50 percent black. HUD made Warren a prime target for Open Communities enforcement and threatened to halt all federal assistance to the town unless it took a series of actions to end racial discrimination there; town officials said progress was being made and that their citizens resented forced integration. Romney rejected this response, partly because when he was governor, Warren residents had thrown rocks and garbage and yelled obscenities for days at a biracial couple who moved into town. Now the secretary said, "The youth of this nation, the minorities of this nation, the discriminated of this nation are not going to wait for 'nature to take its course.' What is really at issue here is responsibility – moral responsibility."

Romney visited Warren in July 1970, where he addressed leaders from it and around 40 nearby suburbs. He emphasized that the government was encouraging affirmative action rather than forced integration, but the local populace saw little difference and Romney was jostled and jeered as a police escort took him away from the meeting place. Nixon saw what happened in Warren and had no interest in the Open Communities policy in general, remarking to domestic adviser John Ehrlichman that, "This country is not ready at this time for either forcibly integrated housing or forcibly integrated education." The Open Communities policy conflicted with Nixon's purported use of the Southern strategy of gaining political support among traditionally white southern Democrats, and his own views on race. Romney was forced to back down on Warren and release federal monies to them unconditionally.

When Black Jack, Missouri, subsequently resisted a HUD-sponsored plan for desegregated lower- and middle-income housing, Romney appealed to U.S. Attorney General John Mitchell for Justice Department intervention. In September 1970, Mitchell refused and Romney's plan collapsed. Under Romney, HUD did establish stricter affirmative racial guidelines in relation to new public housing projects, but overall administration implementation of the Fair Housing Act was lacking. Some of the responsibility lay with Romney's inattentiveness to gaining political backing for the policy, including the failure to rally natural allies such as the NAACP. Salisbury University historian Dean J. Kotlowski writes that, "No civil rights initiative developed on Nixon's watch was as sincerely devised or poorly executed as open communities."

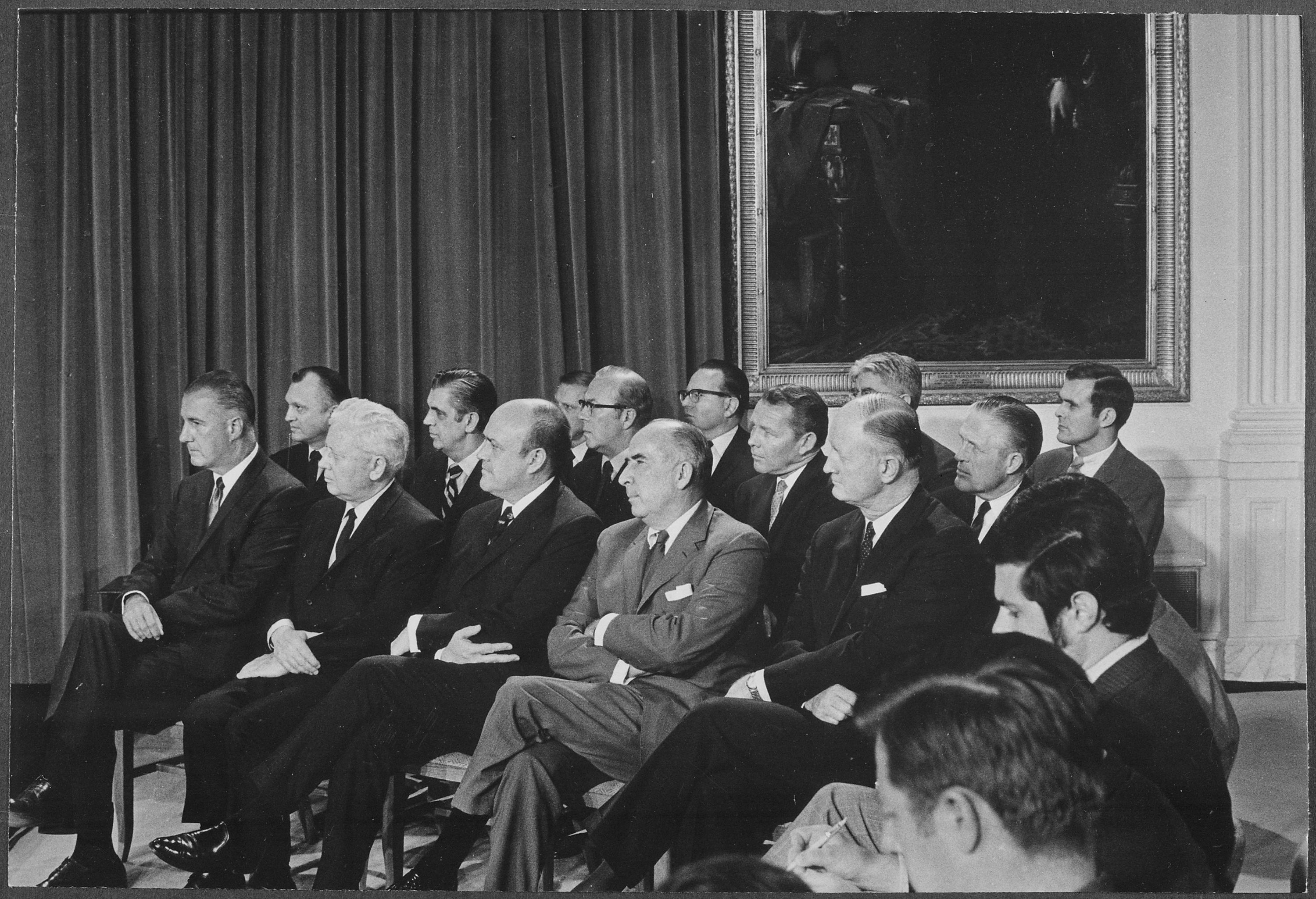
Nixon's cabinet at a 1969 press conference (Romney is last on the right in middle row)

Another of Romney's initiatives was "Operation Breakthrough", launched in June 1969. It was intended to increase the amount of housing available to the poor and it initially had Nixon's support. Based on his automotive industry experience, Romney thought that the cost of housing could be significantly reduced if in-factory modular construction techniques were used, despite the lack of national building standards. HUD officials believed that the introduction of this technique could help bring about desegregation; Romney said, "We've got to put an end to the idea of moving to suburban areas and living only among people of the same economic and social class". This aspect of the program brought about strong opposition at the local suburban level and lost support in the White House as well. Over half of HUD's research funds during this time were spent on Operation Breakthrough, and it was modestly successful in its building goals. It did not revolutionize home construction, and was phased out once Romney left HUD. But it resulted indirectly in more modern and consistent building codes and introduction of technological advances such as the smoke alarm.

In any case, using conventional construction methods, HUD set records for the amount of construction of assisted housing for low- and moderate-income families. Toward the end of his term, Romney oversaw the demolition of the infamous Pruitt–Igoe housing project in St. Louis, which had become crime-ridden, drug-infested, and largely vacant.

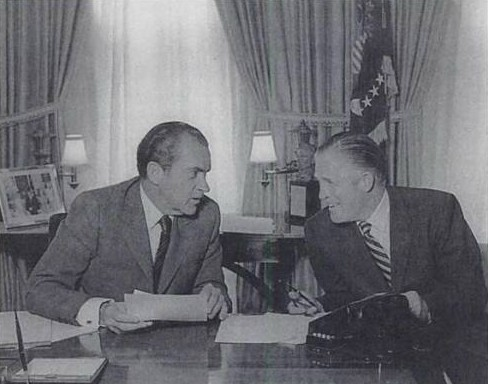
President Nixon and Secretary Romney confer at The White House

Romney was largely outside the president's inner circle and had minimal influence within the Nixon administration. His intense, sometimes bombastic style of making bold advances and awkward pullbacks lacked adequate guile to succeed in Washington. Desegregation efforts in employment and education had more success than in housing during the Nixon administration, but HUD's many missions and unwieldy structure, which sometimes worked at cross-purposes, made it institutionally vulnerable to political attack. Romney also failed to understand or circumvent Nixon's use of counsel Ehrlichman and White House Chief of Staff H. R. Haldeman as policy gatekeepers, resulting in de facto downgrading of the power of cabinet officers. Romney was used to being listened to and making his own decisions; he annoyed Nixon by casually interrupting him at meetings. At one point, Nixon told Haldeman, "Just keep [Romney] away from me." A statement by Romney that he would voluntarily reduce his salary to aid the federal budget was viewed by Nixon as an "ineffective grandstand play".

By early 1970, Nixon had decided he wanted Romney removed from his position. Nixon, who hated to fire people and was, as Ehrlichman later described, "notoriously inadept" at it, instead hatched a plot to get Romney to run in the 1970 U.S. Senate race in Michigan. Instead, Romney proposed that his wife Lenore run, and she received the backing of some state Republicans. There was also resistance to her candidacy and an initial suspicion that it was just a stalking horse for keeping his options open. She barely survived a primary against a conservative opponent, then lost badly in the general election to incumbent Democrat Philip A. Hart. Romney blamed others for his wife having entered the race, when he had been the major force behind it.

In late 1970, after opposition to Open Communities reached a peak, Nixon again decided that Romney should go. Still reluctant to dismiss him, Nixon tried to get Romney to resign by forcing him to capitulate on a series of policy issues. Romney surprised both Nixon and Haldeman by agreeing to back off his positions, and Nixon kept him as HUD secretary. Nixon remarked privately afterwards, "[Romney] talks big but folds under pressure." Puzzled by Nixon's lack of apparent ideological consistency across different areas of the government, Romney told a friend, "I don't know what the president believes in. Maybe he doesn't believe in anything", an assessment shared by others both inside and outside the administration. For his work as Secretary of the Housing and Urban Development, in March 1972 Romney was awarded the Republican of the Year Award by the centrist Republican organization Ripon Society.

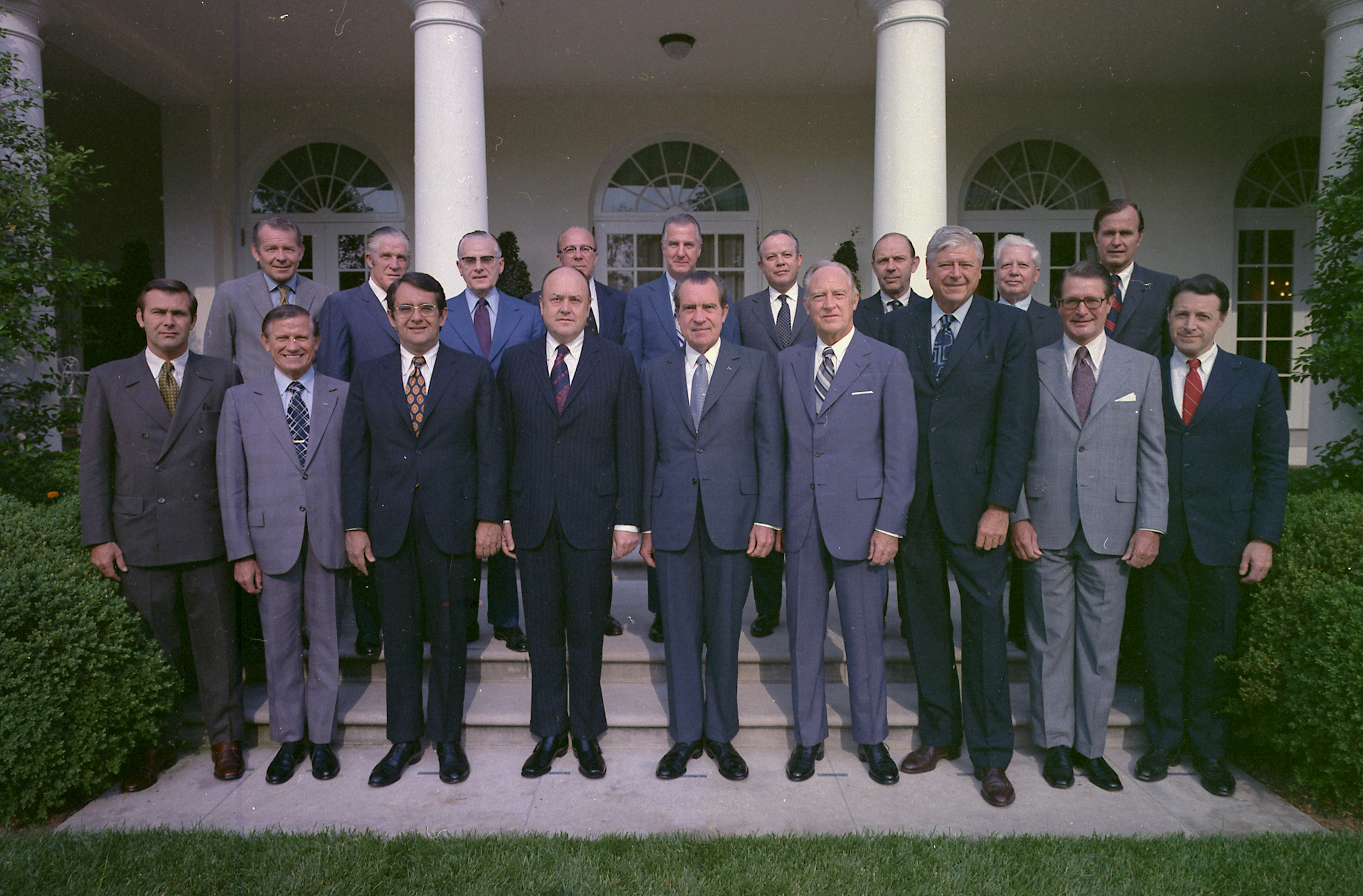
Romney in a group photo of Nixon's cabinet on June 16, 1972, second from the left in the back row

In spring 1972, the FHA was struck by scandal. Since the passage of the Housing and Urban Development Act of 1968 and the creation of the Government National Mortgage Association (Ginnie Mae), it had been responsible for helping the poor buy homes in inner-city areas via government-backed mortgages. These were financed by mortgage-backed securities, the first issues of which Romney had announced in 1970. A number of FHA employees, along with a number of real estate firms and lawyers, were indicted for a scheme in which the value of cheap inner-city homes was inflated and they were sold to black buyers who could not really afford them, based on using those government-backed mortgages. The government was stuck for the bad loans when owners defaulted, as the properties were overvalued and could not be resold at inflated prices. Assessments of the overall cost of the scandal were as high as $2 billion. Romney conceded that HUD had been unprepared to deal with speculators and had not been alert to earlier signs of illegal activity at the FHA. The FHA scandal gave Nixon the ability to shut down HUD's remaining desegregation efforts with little political risk; by January 1973, all federal housing funds had been frozen.

In August 1972, Nixon announced Romney would inspect Hurricane Agnes flood damage in Wilkes-Barre, Pennsylvania, but neglected to tell Romney first. Much of the area lacked shelter six weeks after the storm, residents were angry, and Romney got into a three-way shouting match with Governor Milton J. Shapp and a local citizens' representative. Romney denounced Shapp's proposal that the federal government pay off the mortgages of victims as "unrealistic and demagogic", and the representative angrily said to Romney, "You don't give a damn whether we live or die." The confrontation received wide media attention, damaging Romney's public reputation. Feeling very frustrated, Romney wanted to resign immediately, but Nixon, worried about the fallout to his 1972 re-election campaign among moderate Republican voters, insisted that Romney stay on. Romney agreed, although he indicated to the press that he would leave eventually.

Romney finally turned in his resignation on November 9, 1972, following Nixon's re-election. His departure was announced on November 27, 1972, as part of the initial wave of departures from Nixon's first-term cabinet. Romney said he was unhappy with presidential candidates who declined to address "the real issues" facing the nation for fear they would lose votes, and said he would form a new national citizens' organization that would attempt to enlighten the public on the most vital topics. He added that he would stay on as secretary until his successor could be appointed and confirmed, and did stay until Nixon's second inauguration on January 20, 1973. Upon his departure, Romney said he looked forward "with great enthusiasm" to his return to private life. Romney later said of Nixon: "He was a crook, but he was no dummy."

The Boston Globe later termed Romney's conflicts with Nixon a matter that "played out with Shakespearean drama". Despite all the setbacks and frustrations, University at Buffalo political scientist Charles M. Lamb concludes that Romney pressed harder to achieve suburban integration than any prominent federal official in the ensuing 1970s through the 1990s. Lehman College sociology professor Christopher Bonastia assesses the Romney-era HUD as having come "surprisingly close to implementing unpopular antidiscrimination policies" but finally being unable to produce meaningful alterations in American residential segregation patterns, with no equivalent effort having happened since then or likely to in the foreseeable future. In contrast, Illinois State University historian Roger Biles has termed Romney's tenure as secretary "disastrous" while allowing that none of the secretaries who followed him have done any better.

== Public service, volunteerism, and final years ==
Romney was known as an advocate of public service, and volunteerism was a passion of his. He initiated several volunteer programs while governor, and at the beginning of the Nixon administration chaired the Cabinet Committee on Voluntary Action. Out of this the National Center for Voluntary Action was created: an independent, private, non-profit organization intended to encourage volunteerism on the part of American citizens and organizations, to assist in program development for voluntary efforts, and to make voluntary action an important force in American society. Romney's long interest in volunteerism stemmed from the Latter-day Saint belief in the power of institutions to transform the individual, but also had a secular basis. At the National Center's first meeting on February 20, 1970, he said:

Americans have four basic ways of solving problems that are too big for individuals to handle by themselves. One is through the federal government. A second is through state governments and the local governments that the states create. The third is through the private sector – the economic sector that includes business, agriculture, and labor. The fourth method is the independent sector – the voluntary, cooperative action of free individuals and independent association. Voluntary action is the most powerful of these, because it is uniquely capable of stirring the people themselves and involving their enthusiastic energies, because it is their own – voluntary action is the people's action. ... As Woodrow Wilson said, "The most powerful force on earth is the spontaneous cooperation of a free people." Individualism makes cooperation worthwhile – but cooperation makes freedom possible.

In 1973, after he left the cabinet, Romney became chair and CEO of the National Center for Voluntary Action. In 1979, this organization merged with the Colorado-based National Information Center on Volunteerism and became known as VOLUNTEER: The National Center for Citizen Involvement; Romney headed the new organization. The organization simplified its name to VOLUNTEER: The National Center in 1984 and to the National Volunteer Center in 1990. Romney remained as chair of these organizations throughout this time. Nonetheless, the transition away from being a significant figure in the political world was difficult for him and led to several years where he felt dispirited.

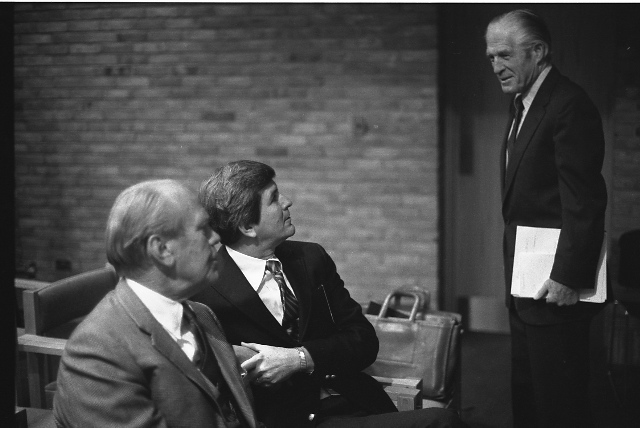
George Romney with former President Gerald Ford and former Cabinet secretary David Mathews during a conference at the Gerald R. Ford Presidential Library in 1986

Within the Church, Romney remained active and prominent, serving as a patriarch of the Bloomfield Hills stake and holding the office of regional representative of the Twelve, covering Michigan and northern Ohio. He joined the Church in opposing the Equal Rights Amendment to the U.S. Constitution, claiming in 1979 that it was intended to support "perverted and improper sexual conduct." During the early part of the Reagan administration, Romney served on the President's Task Force for Private Sector Initiatives, along with a member of the first presidency of the church, Thomas S. Monson. As part of a longtime habit of playing golf daily, he had long ago concocted a "compact 18" format in which he played three balls on each of six holes, or similar formulations depending upon the amount of daylight. In 1987, he held a four-generation extended family reunion in Washington, where he showed the places and recounted the events of his life which had occurred there. Looking back on his and some other failed presidential bids, he once concluded, "You can't be right too soon and win elections."

President George H. W. Bush's Points of Light Foundation was created in 1990, also to encourage volunteerism. Romney received the Points of Light Foundation's inaugural Lifetime Achievement Award from President Bush in April 1991. The Bush administration wanted to tap Romney to chair the new foundation, but he reportedly refused to head two organizations doing the same thing and suggested they merge. They did so in September 1991, and Romney became one of the founding directors of the Points of Light Foundation & Volunteer Center National Network. In the early 1990s, Romney was also involved in helping to set up the Commission on National and Community Service, one of the predecessors to the later Corporation for National and Community Service (CNCS). He gave speeches emphasizing the vital role of people helping people, and in 1993 inspired the first national meeting of volunteer centers.

For much of his final two decades, Romney had been out of the political eye, and but he re-emerged to the general public when he campaigned for his son, Mitt Romney, during the younger Romney's bid to unseat Senator Ted Kennedy in the 1994 U.S. Senate election in Massachusetts. Romney had urged Mitt to enter the race and moved into his son's house for its duration, serving as an unofficial advisor. Romney was a vigorous surrogate for his son in public appearances and at fundraising events, which on the whole benefited the campaign. When Kennedy's campaign sought to bring up the Church's past policy on blacks, Romney interrupted Mitt's press conference and said loudly, "I think it is absolutely wrong to keep hammering on the religious issues. And what Ted is trying to do is bring it into the picture." The father counseled the son to be relaxed in appearance and to pay less attention to his political consultants and more to his own instincts, a change that the younger Romney made late in the ultimately unsuccessful campaign.

That same year, Ronna Romney, Romney's ex-daughter-in-law (formerly married to G. Scott Romney), decided to seek the Republican nomination for the U.S. Senate from Michigan. While Mitt and G. Scott endorsed Ronna Romney, George Romney had endorsed her opponent and the eventual winner, Spencer Abraham, during the previous year when Ronna was considering a run but had not yet announced. A family spokesperson said that George Romney had endorsed Abraham before knowing Ronna Romney would run and could not go back on his word, although he did refrain from personally campaigning on Abraham's behalf.

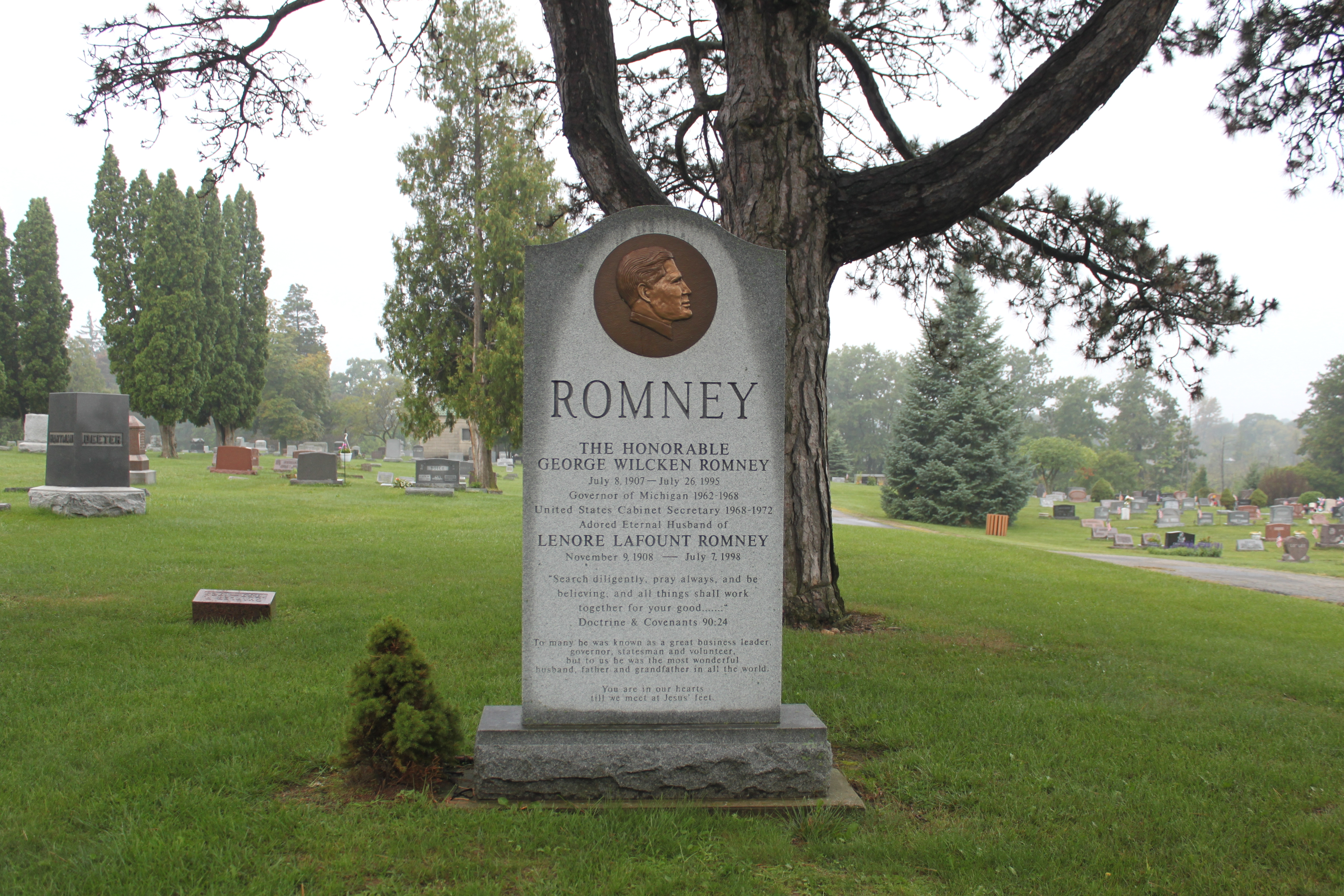
Final resting place

By January 1995, amid press criticism of the Points of Light Foundation engaging in ineffective, wasteful spending, Romney expressed concern that the organization had too high a budget. Active to the end, in July 1995, four days before his death, Romney proposed a presidential summit to encourage greater volunteerism and community service, and the night before his death he drove to a meeting of another volunteer organization.

On July 26, 1995, Romney died of a heart attack at the age of 88 while he was doing his morning exercising on a treadmill at his home in Bloomfield Hills, Michigan; he was discovered by his wife, Lenore, but it was too late to save him. He was buried at the Fairview Cemetery in Brighton, Michigan. In addition to his wife and children, Romney was survived by 23 grandchildren and 33 great-grandchildren.

== Legacy ==
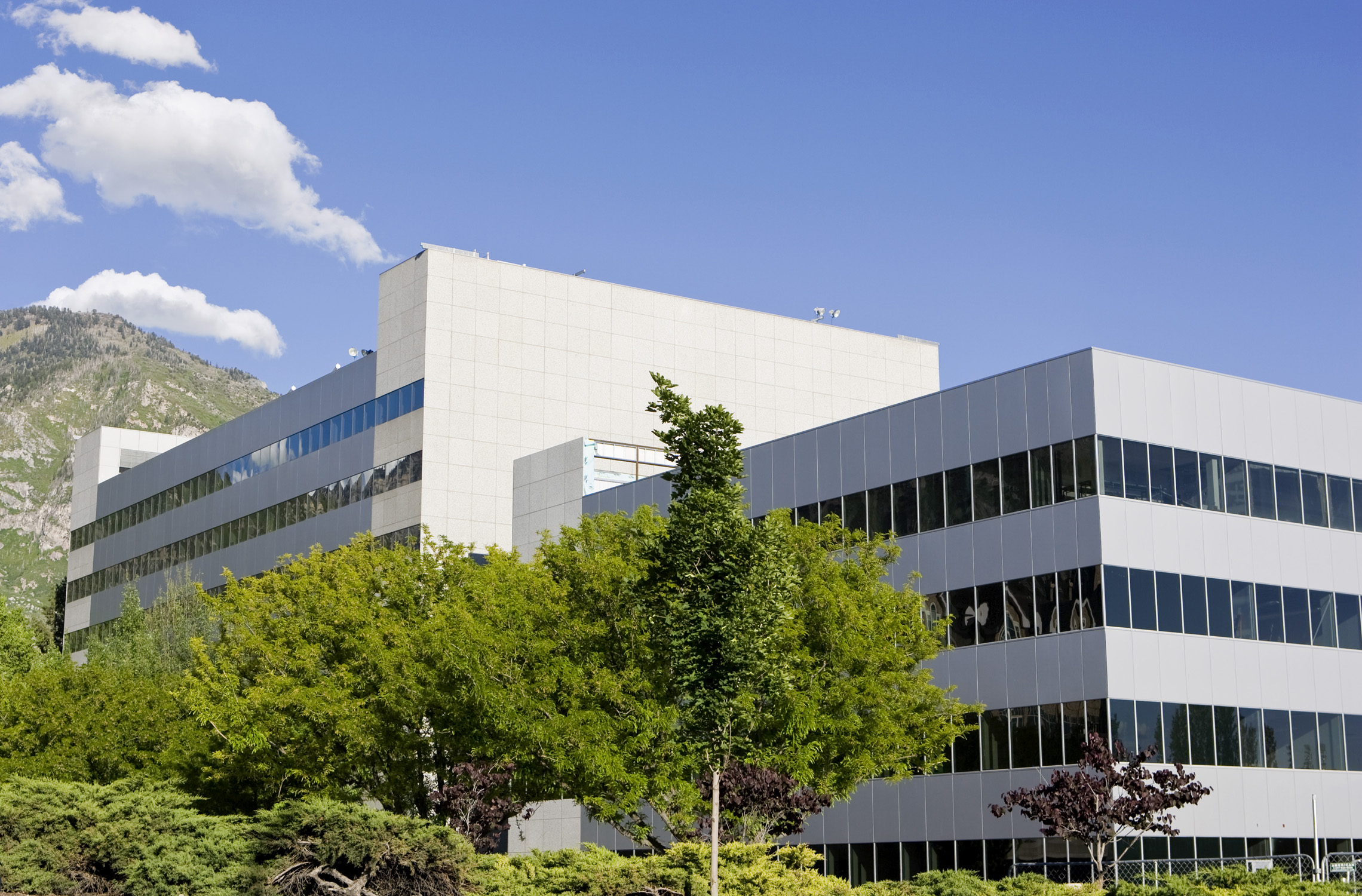
In 1998, BYU's Marriott School of Management named its Institute of Public Management in Romney's honor.

The Presidents' Summit For America's Future took place in Philadelphia in 1997, manifesting Romney's last volunteerism proposal, with the organization America's Promise coming out of it. For many years, the Points of Light Foundation (and its predecessor organization) has given out an annual Lenore and George W. Romney Citizen Volunteer Award (later retitled the George and Lenore Romney Citizen Volunteer Award); the inaugural award in 1987 went to George Romney himself. The Points of Light Foundation and the CNCS also give out a George W. Romney Volunteer Center Excellence Award (later the George W. Romney Excellence Award) at the annual National Conference on Community Volunteering and National Service (later the National Conference on Volunteering and Service). The George W. Romney Volunteer Center itself is sponsored by the United Way for Southeastern Michigan, and began during Romney's lifetime.

The Automotive Hall of Fame of Dearborn, Michigan honored Romney with its Distinguished Service Citation award in 1956. He was then inducted into the hall of fame itself in 1995.

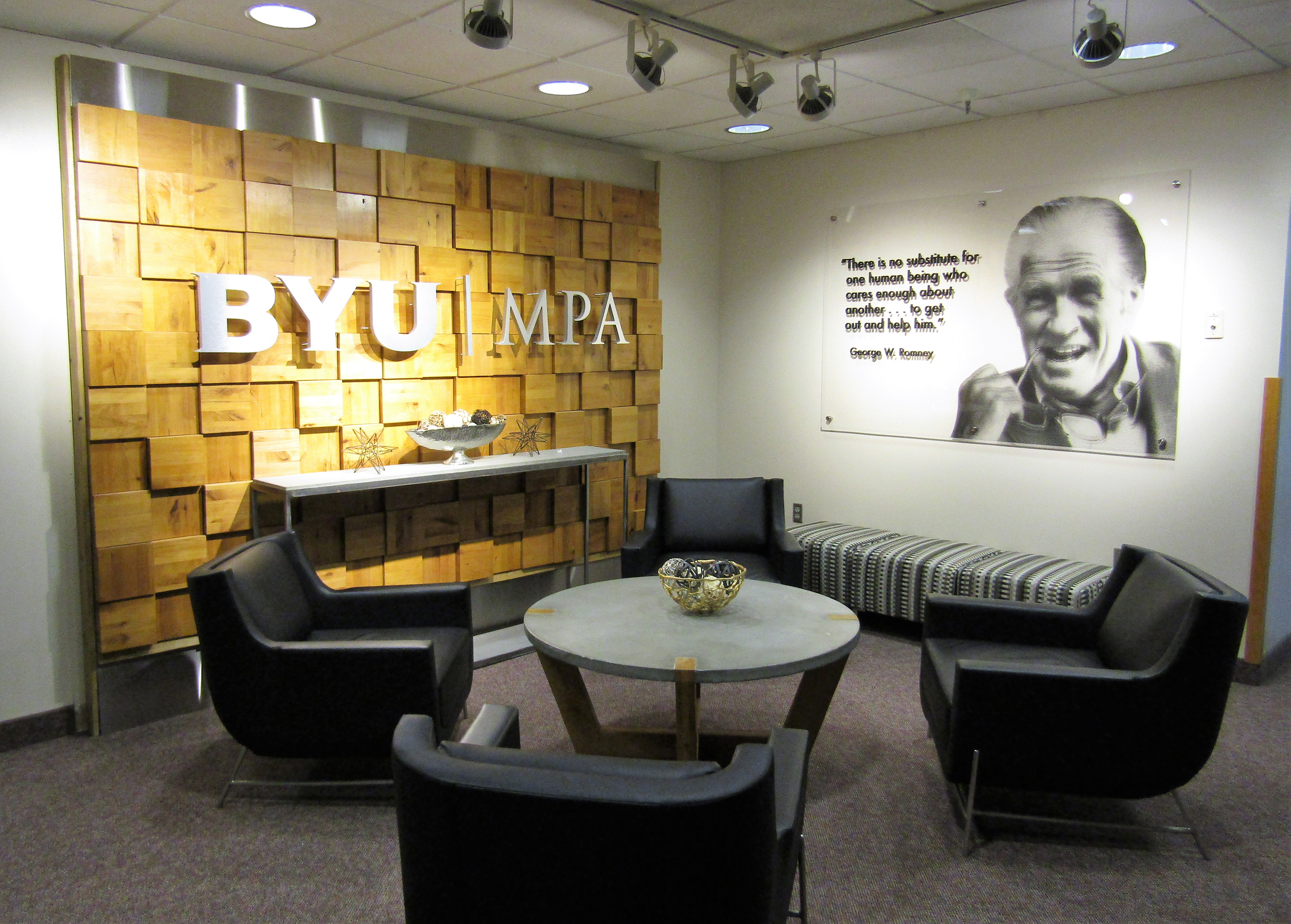
BYU room that gives information about the Masters in Public Administration

Founded in 1998 with a grant from Romney's immediate family, the George W. Romney Institute of Public Management in the Marriott School of Management at Brigham Young University (BYU) honors the legacy left by Romney. Its mission is to develop people of high character who are committed to service, management, and leadership in the public sector and in non-profit organizations throughout the world.

The building housing the main offices of the governor of Michigan in Lansing is known as the George W. Romney Building following a 1997 renaming. The Governor George Romney Lifetime Achievement Award is given annually by the State of Michigan, to recognize citizens who have demonstrated a commitment to community involvement and volunteer service throughout their lifetimes. In 2010, Adrian College in Michigan announced the opening of its George Romney Institute for Law and Public Policy. Its purpose is to explore the interdisciplinary nature of law and public policy and encourage practitioners, academics, and students to work together on issues in this realm.

Romney was a recipient of the Gold Good Citizenship Medal awarded by the Michigan Society of the Sons of the American Revolution. On January 4, 2025, president Joe Biden posthumously honored him with the Presidential Medal of Freedom, which his son, Mitt Romney, accepted on his behalf.

== Authored books ==
- The Concerns of a Citizen. New York: G. P. Putnam's Sons. 1968. OCLC 897237.
- The Mission and the Dream. New York: G. P. Putnam's Sons. 1968. (Galley proofs produced, but prepress process ceased before actual publication)

== See also ==
- List of United States governors born outside the United States

Business positions
Preceded by George W. Mason	Board Chair and President of American Motors; 1954–1962	Succeeded by Roy Abernethy
Party political offices
Preceded by Paul Bagwell	Republican nominee for Governor of Michigan; 1962, 1964, 1966	Succeeded by William Milliken
Political offices
Preceded by John Swainson	Governor of Michigan; 1963–1969	Succeeded by William Milliken
Preceded by Robert Coldwell Wood	United States Secretary of Housing and Urban Development; 1969–1973	Succeeded by James T. Lynn
