= Triptyq =

American hip hop group

Background information
- Genres: Classical, hip hop
- Years active: 2012–present
- Members: Antoniette Costa; Tara Kamangar; Kevin Olusola
- Website: triptyq.com

Triptyq is a classical hip hop project consisting of Antoniette Costa (vocals, harp), Tara Kamangar (piano, violin), and Kevin Olusola (cello, beatboxing). The trio has performed at the Festival del Sole and the National Academy of Recording Arts and Sciences Headquarters. Their first single, "Mr. Right," debuted at #2 on the Classical iTunes Chart.
