= Domenico Montagnana =

Italian luthier (1686–1750)

Domenico Montagnana (24 June 1686 – 6 March 1750) was an Italian master luthier based in Venice, Italy. He is regarded as one of the finest violin and cello makers of his time.

His pieces, particularly his cellos, are sought after by orchestras, notable musicians or collectors, and many form parts of collections in museums. The record price for this luthier was $903,924 in 2010 for a violin.

== Biography ==
Montagnana was born in Lendinara, Italy in 1686. His father, Paolo, was a shoemaker. He made stringed musical instruments (violins, violas, cellos and double basses) in Venice. He was apprenticed in Matteo Sella's workshop (probably also associated with Matteo Goffriller) and after that he opened his own shop, active from 1712, located in Calle degli Stagneri, with insignia "Alla Cremona".

Typically 1 cm shorter than a "forma B" cello made by Stradivarius, and 2 cm wider between the C bouts, the signature sound of a Montagnana cello is "uncomplicated" to play (according to Jacqueline du Pré's description of the Montagnana cello played by Martin Lovett of the Amadeus Quartet ). One can hit the bow hard on a Montagnana cello while playing, and the sound will continue to come out and become more interesting. As a contrast, for a Stradivarius cello, in general, you have to coax it out (based on a famous description of Jacqueline du Pré's Davidov Stradivarius reputedly made by Yo-Yo Ma: "Jackie's unbridled dark qualities went against the Davydov. You have to coax the instrument. The more you attack it, the less it returns").

Montagnana met a Venetian woman living in the Calle degli Stagneri/Santo Bartolomeo district, Caterina Berti, whom he married. The couple lived in Venice and had six daughters.

Following the birth of their last child, Caterina began suffering from progressive paralysis, which eventually led to her death in 1748. It seems that this final blow was too much for Montagnana, who until then had been seeking refuge in his workshop and spending a much longer time than usual on the meticulous details of his instruments. His health began to decline rapidly, for unspecified causes and, by February 1750, he was bedridden. His death certificate states that he died after being confined to his bed for one month with "hypochondria".

He died in Venice, Italy in 1750. His workshop was then inherited by Giorgio Serafin, the nephew of Sanctus Seraphin.

== Legacy ==
Many of his instruments are used by famous musicians or are part of public or private collections. Artists who play or have played on Montagnanas include Boris Andrianov, Sevak Avanesyan, Virgil Boutellis-Taft, Orlando Cole, Maurice Eisenberg, Emanuel Feuermann, Ilya Finkelshteyn, Lynn Harrell, Steven Isserlis, Stefan Jackiw, Victor Julien-Laferrière, Stephen Kates, Ralph Kirshbaum, Sylvia Lent, Yo-Yo Ma, Mischa Maisky, Truls Mørk, Nathaniel Rosen, Daniel Saidenberg, Heinrich Schiff, Albert Spalding, Guilhermina Suggia, Lionel Tertis, István Várdai, Alfred Wallenstein, Raphael Wallfisch, and Paul Watkins.

=== Famous cellos ===
- Montagnana (1710), owned by Guilhermina Suggia
- Esquire (1723), on loan to Harriet Krijgh
- Petunia (1733), owned by Yo-Yo Ma
- Ex-Romberg (1733), on loan to Raphael Wallfisch
- Feuermann (1735), Swiss collector, previously owned by Emmanuel Feuermann
- Ex-Servais (1738), owned by Nathaniel Rosen
- Mighty Venetian (1738), owned by Nathaniel Rosen; previously owned by Adrien-Francois Servais and Thomas Haddock
- Kates-Hancock (1739), owned by Stephen Kates until 2003
- Sleeping Beauty (1739), owned by Heinrich Schiff
- Baron Steinheil (1740)
- Duchess of Cleveland (1740)

=== Famous violins ===
- Mackenzie (1721)
- Ex-Bloomfield (1731)
- Spalding (1731), owned by Albert Spalding
- Ex-Régis Pasquier (1742), played by Virgil Boutellis-Taft

An international festival with concerts where some of Montagnana's instruments are used is held every year in his native town, Lendinara.

== Sources ==
- Violin and Lute Makers of Venice 1640 - 1760 by Stefano Pio. Ed. Venice research, Venice, Italy, 2004 ISBN 978-88-907252-2-7
