= Antoniette Costa =

American singer-songwriter

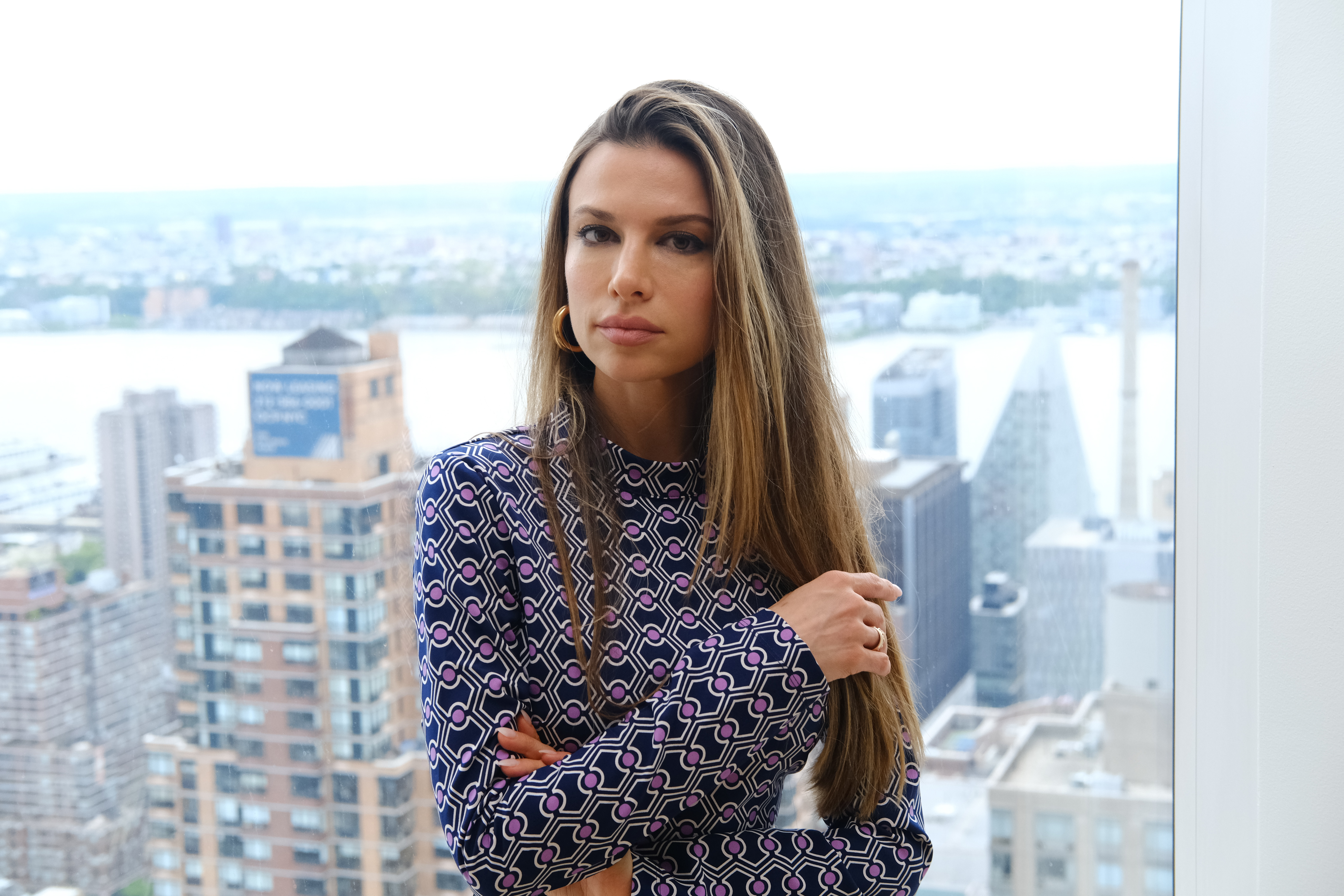

Background information
- Origin: Pittsburgh, Pennsylvania, U.S.
- Genres: Jazz; soul; classical; hip hop
- Occupations: Singer; songwriter; columnist
- Instruments: Vocals; piano; harp; guitar
- Years active: 2005–present
- Label: LIPlabel14
- Website: antoniettecosta.com

Antoniette Costa is an Italian-American singer-songwriter and co-founder of Humans of Fashion Foundation. Costa composed the song "Void of a Legend" which featured the beatboxer and cellist Kevin Olusola. The song topped the Classical Crossover charts and was covered by French Band L.E.J. In 2016, Costa released "The Triptyq Sessions" as part of the musical trio Triptyq, which featured Olusola (beatboxing, cello) and Tara Kamangar (piano, violin). The music video for "Mr. Right" produced by James Poyser featured cameos by Margot Robbie and Valentina Zelyaeva.

Costa has collaborated with or performed alongside artists such as The Roots, Jazmine Sullivan, Bilal, Eric Roberson, and Carvin Haggins. She released her debut album Breakthru in March 2005, and has additionally recorded over a dozen singles with musicians such as Jazzyfatnastees, Antibalas Afrobeat Orchestra, Kindred the Family Soul and Grammy Award winners James Poyser and Questlove.

She has performed and directed live in-studio recording sessions in New York City open to the public, drawing largely from Columbia University's student body where Costa is a student. Called the "Track 14 Sessions," guest musicians have included members of The Roots and Nikki Jean.

== Early life ==
Antoniette Costa was raised in Pittsburgh, Pennsylvania and has dual United States and Italian citizenship. She began writing songs in middle school, composing both the music and lyrics. She sings and plays piano, harp, and guitar.

In 2004 Costa began attending Cornell University. She lived in the Just About Music residence and became lead singer for the band LR9. As a freshman, Costa was a part of the university's gospel choir. She performed in Sage Chapel with the group for Yolanda King. Costa transferred to the University of Pennsylvania as a sophomore after her aunt Lilly died during childbirth. She discovered 14 poems written by her aunt, and was inspired to spend time focused on songwriting and music in dedication. She currently studies at Columbia University.

== Early career ==
=== Breakthru (2005) ===
Costa founded her own record label L.I.P. Label 14, and independently released her debut album Breakthru on March 1, 2005. Some of the tracks are piano ballads, while others are accompanied by a band. Dedicated to her aunt, the album featured 12 songs that had been written from middle-school to college, including "Flown Away." The album ranked #1 on Amazon's Early Adopter Indie Music Chart and #69 on the Early Adopter AllMusic Chart.

=== The Roots collaborations ===
Dice Raw, the Philadelphia-based rapper and A&R of The Roots, discovered Breakthru and began working with Costa. Through Dice she began writing and rehearsing at Larry Gold's "The Studio" in Philadelphia, where she worked with drummer Questlove, producer Khari "Ferrari" Mateen, Jon Jon McGlincey, and close friend Nikki Jean.

Costa graduated as an English major from the University of Pennsylvania in 2008. She was a columnist for The Daily Pennsylvanian. She moved to New York City to work for MTV in their Business and Legal Affairs and Music and Media Licensing Departments. She is currently a post-bac student at Columbia University.

On November 5, 2008, Costa had a private showcase for her single "Ready to Make it Work" at the Le Poisson Rouge in New York City. The event included DJ sets by Questlove and Samantha Ronson. Throughout 2010 Costa released a number of singles, including "We Were Meant To Be" and "Sinking Deeper." "We Were Meant to Be" was Costa's collaboration with co-writer Carvin Haggins and pianist James Poyser, who has worked with Mariah Carey.

Richard Nichols, the manager of The Roots and executive producer of Lay It Down by Al Green, took a liking to Costa's song "The Gift." He has since produced "The Gift" and "Ready to Make It Work." The track features musicians James Poyser, Questlove, Steve Jordan and Kindred the Family Soul. Antibalas Afrobeat Orchestra remixed "Ready to Make it Work."

=== Track 14 Sessions ===
In January 2011, Costa began hosting "Track 14 Sessions" at Legacy Recording Studio in Times Square. The series opened up Costa's recording sessions to the public, and featured guest performances by Nikki Jean and Khari Mateen. According to Costa, the sessions are "meant to unveil what goes on in the recording studio ... It's an intimate live performance where people can hear raw vocals and instrumentation with amplification." "Track 14" refers to the train Costa takes to travel between New York City and Philadelphia, as she regularly rehearses and records in both cities. Costa also announced that she will release a live album based on the sessions.

=== "Void of a Legend" ===
In the summer of 2011 Costa met Kevin "K.O." Olusola through LCD Soundsystem frontman James Murphy, who was a mutual friend at Wyclef Jean's studio in New Jersey. Olusola is a known as beat-boxing cellist. He and Costa collaborated on recording "Void of a Legend," which Costa wrote. It was released as a single on August 25, 2011, and debuted at No. 51 on the U.S. iTunes Classical Music Chart. A music video was released and featured on the CBS website.

=== "Pitupatter" ===
Pitupatter is Costa's third album, released in July 2024, one year after she recovered from neurosurgery to remove a brain tumor. She started to write the title track while in the MRI machine, distracting herself by focusing on writing harmonies to the sounds. In a People (magazine) article, the singer says, "You drown out every good sound with that big bad mouth... I was actually talking to the machine." The album features collaborations with GRAMMY-nominated artists such as Raymond Angry, James Poyser, Dice Raw, TK Wonder, Steve McKie, Anthony C. Bell, George "Spanky" McCurdy and others. The album was executive-produced by Khari Mateen.

== Style ==
Costa has been influenced by musicians such as Tracy Chapman and soul singer Jazmine Sullivan. Many of her lyrical themes center around family, personal experiences, and literature, and has stated "For me, writing a song is like bottling an emotion in its most potent form."

According to the Columbia Spectator, Costa more closely identifies with gospel singers using their intuition, as compared to classically trained musicians. "I'm afraid that by taking a music theory class, I'm not going to be as creative," she said. "Not knowing what's right or wrong or what's typical composition-wise makes my music more free in the sense that I'm not trying to assume an ABA-structure or something like that."

== Discography ==
Albums

- Breakthru (2005)
- Pitupatter (2024)

Singles

- "Ready to Make it Work" (2008)
- "Sinking Deeper" (2010)
- "Played Me" (2010)
- "You Better Forget" (2010)
- "We Were Meant To Be" (2010)
- "Void of a Legend" (2011)
- "Stranded" (2011)
- "Stranded" (2013)
- "Mr. Right" (2014)
- "Camouflage Me" (2016)
- "When I Fall (Outta Love) " (2016)
- "Murphy" (2016)
