= Tara Kamangar =

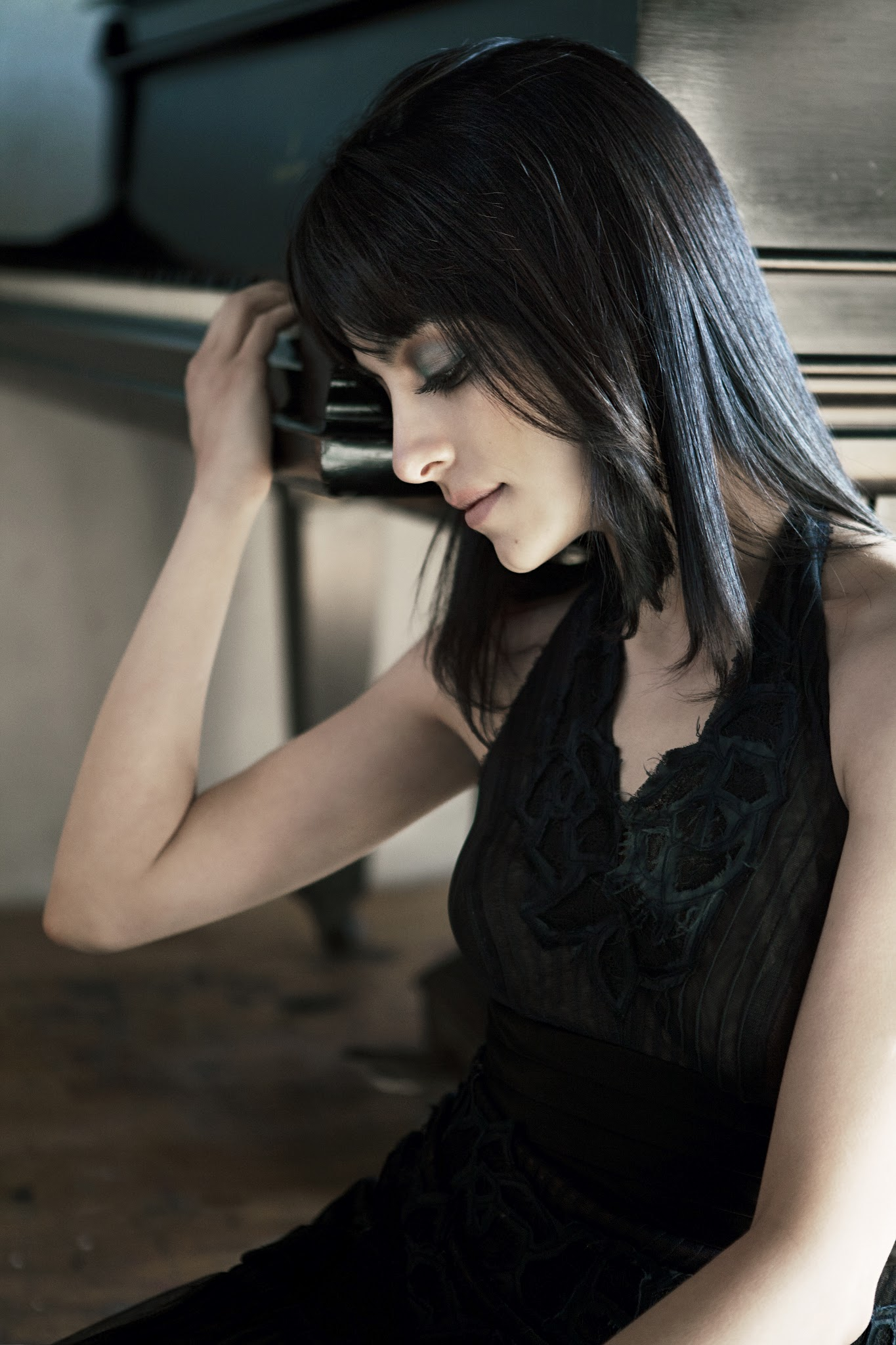

Background information
- Born: Stanford, California, United States
- Genres: Classical, world
- Occupations: Pianist, composer
- Instruments: Piano, violin
- Years active: 2005–present
- Label: Delos Productions
- Website: tarakamangar.net

Tara Kamangar is a classical pianist and composer.

== Biography ==
Born in Stanford, California, Tara Kamangar began studying piano and violin at the age of three.

Kamangar has premiered several works by Iranian composers throughout the U.S. and Europe, including the U.S. Premieres of Aminollah Hossein’s Concerto No. 2 and Concerto No. 3 and the world premiere of Naji Hakim’s Esquisses Persanes. She has performed at London's Cadogan Hall, New York City's Carnegie Hall, DC's National Gallery of Art, Oakland's Paramount Theatre, San Francisco's Masonic Auditorium, LA's Disney Hall and Sweden's Gothenburg Concert Hall and Södra Teatern, among other venues, and collaborated with conductors including Loris Tjeknavorian, Michael Morgan (conductor) and Henrik Jul Hansen.

Kamangar is an honors graduate of Harvard University, where she studied Anthropology, and London's Royal Academy of Music, where she studied with Patsy Toh as a recipient of the Kathleen Bayfield scholarship.

== Recordings ==
=== East of Melancholy ===
Kamangar’s solo classical piano album, "East of Melancholy: Piano Music from Russia to Iran," was released on the Delos Productions label and distributed internationally by Naxos Records. Recorded on The Scoring Stage at Skywalker Sound by producer and Grammy Award winning engineer Leslie Ann Jones, the album explores the musical connection between the countries from Russia to Iran. The album reached No. 12 on the Billboard's classical chart, and was critically acclaimed.

=== Collaborations ===
Kamangar wrote the original score for the documentary "Fifi Howls from Happiness" (France/Iran) directed by Mitra Farahani. An avid composer with a background in ethnomusicology, she has incorporated Kurdish folk music into her classical compositions.

Kamangar has collaborated with musicians across several genres, from Spanish classical guitarist Angel Romero to multi-platinum R&B producer James Poyser. She is the pianist, violinist, co-composer and co-producer for the classical hip hop project Triptyq (with soul singer Antoniette Costa and Pentatonix cellist/beatboxer Kevin Olusola) whose EP debuted in the top ten of Billboard's classical chart. Kamangar has arranged and recorded for Mohsen Namjoo as a pianist, and arranged and recorded violin for Kiosk (band) in their last four albums and throughout several tours.
