= Break Through (play) =

Play by Alexandre Wall

- Written by: Alexandre Wall
- Characters: Selena Bass; Christian Cheker; Michael Dritto; Austen Edwards; Jason Gootner; Harrison Grant; Bryant Hernandez; Margaret Hunsicker; Danielle Moses; Michael Rodney; Jayce Storcy; Katie Thayer; Leah Williams; Veronica Zazzaro
- Subject: LGBTQ+

Premiere
- Date: March 17, 2011
- Place: University of Central Florida Conservatory Theater
- Directed by: Gabrielle Shulruff

Break Through is a 2011 American episodic play written by Alexandre Wall. It originally debuted at the University of Central Florida Conservatory Theater on March 17, 2011.

The play comprises various monologues and scenes that chronicle different aspects of the lives of gay, lesbian, bisexual, and transgender Americans. The theme of overcoming discrimination and other obstacles is persistent throughout each of the scenes, which are grouped into two acts. The final scene touches on the topic of suicide, an issue that first came to the foreground of national consciousness in late 2010 amid a wave of LGBT teen suicides.

It had a successful run at several Central Florida theaters and was featured at Orlando's premiere LGBT pride event, Come Out With Pride 2011 and raised over $2,000 for an LGBT non-profit organization, the Zebra Coalition.

The debut was produced and directed by Gabrielle Shulruff. Original Cast: Selena Bass, Christian Cheker, Michael Dritto, Austen Edwards, Jason Gootner, Harrison Grant, Bryant Hernandez, Margaret Hunsicker, Danielle Moses, Michael Rodney, Jayne Storcy, Katie Thayer, Leah Williams, and Veronica Zazzaro

A documentary on the real stories behind Break Through is currently in production.
