= Operation Breakthrough (housing program) =

US housing program

Operation Breakthrough was a program of the US Department of Housing and Urban Development, authorized by the Housing Law of 1968, a 3-phase HUD demonstration that tested innovative building materials and methods.

George Romney announced Operation Breakthrough in May 1969, four months after joining President Richard Nixon’s cabinet as secretary of Housing and Urban Development (HUD).

It was intended to increase the amount of housing available to the poor and it initially had Nixon's support. Based on his automotive industry experience, Romney thought that the cost of housing could be significantly reduced if in-factory modular construction techniques were used, despite the lack of national building standards. HUD officials believed that the introduction of this technique could help bring about desegregation; Romney said, "We've got to put an end to the idea of moving to suburban areas and living only among people of the same economic and social class". This aspect of the program brought about strong opposition at the local suburban level and lost support in the White House as well. Over half of HUD's research funds during this time were spent on Operation Breakthrough, and it was modestly successful in its building goals. It did not revolutionize home construction, and was phased out once Romney left HUD. But it resulted indirectly in more modern and consistent building codes and introduction of technological advances such as the smoke alarm.

While Operation Breakthrough made little impact in the United States, it radically influenced other countries, as Japan and Sweden.

== See also ==
- George W. Romney
- United States Department of Housing and Urban Development
