= President's Task Force on Private Sector Initiatives =

The President's Task Force on Private Sector Initiatives was created on 14 October 1981 by former U.S. President Ronald Reagan, to advise the President, the Secretary of Commerce, and other Executive agency heads on:

1. Methods of developing, supporting and promoting private sector leadership and responsibility for meeting public needs.
2. Recommendations for appropriate action by the President to foster greater public-private partnerships and to decrease dependence on government.

The President's Task Force on Private Sector Initiatives was established by President Regan in 1981 to help encourage more private contributions of both human and financial resources to the progress of America's communities. Chaired by C. William Verity Jr. the Task Force included 44 members and 11 committees. The Committee on Marshalling Human Resources, Frank Pace Jr., chairman, set an agenda to encourage increased commitment, recruitment, placement, and management of volunteers in community service and to enhance the atmosphere for volunteering. VOLUNTEERS; A VALUABLE RESOURCE was prepared by the committee specifically for the use of policy makers. The development of the publication was directed by Susan C. Kudlow, on loan from Call For Action, Inc., and was written by Thomazine Shanahan.

The task force was terminated 31 Dec 1982, as mandated in the Executive Order which created it.
