= Breakthru (Costa album) =

Studio album by Antoniette Costa
- Released: March 1, 2005
- Genre: Contemporary R&B, Soul, Rock
- Label: L.I.P. Label 14

Antoniette Costa chronology
| Breakthru (2005) | Sinking Deeper (2010) |

Breakthru is the self-released debut album by American singer-songwriter Antoniette Costa. It was released on her label L.I.P. Label 14 on March 1, 2005.

== History ==
The album exhibits Costa's R&B and soul tendencies as a singer-songwriter. Some of the 12 tracks are piano ballads, while others are accompanied by a band. The album was dedicated to her recently deceased aunt, and featured 12 songs that had been written from middle-school to college. In honor of her aunt, who was an avid supporter of education, Costa donated a percentage of the album sales to the Rosalita Costa-Clark School Fund in Pittsburgh.

=== Release ===
Costa independently released the album on March 1, 2005, on her own record label L.I.P. Label 14. The album ranked No. 1 on Amazon's Early Adopter Indie Music Chart and No. 69 on the Early Adopter All Music Chart. It also led to Costa's future collaborations with members of The Roots.

== Track listing ==
| No. | Title | Length |
|---|---|---|
| 1. | "Said Who" | 3:18 |
| 2. | "Murphy" | 3:06 |
| 3. | "Vieni Con Mi" | 2:22 |
| 4. | "Your Turn" | 4:16 |
| 5. | "You've Lost My Love" | 3:23 |
| 6. | "Never Should Have" | 3:28 |
| 7. | "Flown Away" | 2:10 |
| 8. | "Impression" | 1:48 |
| 9. | "Radiant Glow" | 3:28 |
| 10. | "I Am" | 2:31 |
| 11. | "Dream" | 2:21 |
| 12. | "Caroline's Camelot" | 2:58 |
