= Busy line interrupt =

Function in landline telephony

Busy line interrupt, also known as emergency breakthrough, is a function of telephone land line carriers in which a telephone operator, by request of a caller, interrupts an existing phone conversation between other parties. This is especially useful for services without call waiting.

Much like long distance calling before the late 1990s, busy line interrupt is a service provided, for instance, to allow people to contact a family member in the event of an emergency if the receiving party's line is busy.

The service is not free and is charged whether or not the calling party can reach the person on the other end (as the phone just might be off the hook for privacy reasons or the line could be busy carrying a modem call). For this reason, it is usually only used in cases of emergencies as noted above.
