= List of Royal College of Music people =

This is a partial listing of alumni, teachers and Fellows of the Royal College of Music, London.

== Alumni and faculty ==
- Further former students can be found at Category:Alumni of the Royal College of Music.
- Further former and present teachers can be found at Category:Academics of the Royal College of Music.
- Richard Addinsell (1904–1977), composer
- Richard Adeney (1920–2010), flautist
- Sir Thomas Allen (born 1944), singer
- Julian Anderson (born 1967), composer
- Richard Arnell (1917–2009), composer
- Sir Malcolm Arnold (1921–2006), composer
- Alexander Baillie (born 1956), cellist
- Evelyn Barbirolli (1911–2008), oboist
- Peter Bassano (1945–2025), trombonist, conductor
- John S. Beckett (1927–2007), composer, performer and conductor
- Luke Bedford (born 1978), composer
- Adrian Beers (1923–2004), double bass player
- Derek Bell (1935–2002), composer, harpist, and pianist
- James Bernard (1925–2001), composer
- John Birch (1929-2012), organist
- Roger Birnstingl, (born 1932) bassoonist
- Robin Blaze (born 1970), countertenor
- Sir Arthur Bliss (1891–1975), composer
- Rutland Boughton (1878–1960), composer
- Julian Bream (1933–2020), guitarist and lutenist
- Frank Bridge (1879–1941), composer
- Benjamin Britten (1913–1976), composer
- Sheila Bromberg (1928-2021), harpist
- Rachel Brown (living), flautist
- Timothy Brown (living), hornist
- Aylmer Buesst (1883–1970), conductor
- Steve Burke (born 1974), video game composer and sound designer
- George Butterworth (1885–1916), composer
- Amice Calverley (1896–1959), composer, Egyptologist
- Clive Carey (1883–1968), baritone, opera producer, composer and folk-song collector
- Ronald Cavaye (born 1951), pianist and writer
- Otie Chew Becker (1880–1953), violinist
- Samuel Coleridge-Taylor (1875–1912), composer
- Sarah Connolly (born 1963), mezzo-soprano
- David Cordier (born 1959), countertenor
- Charles Daniels (born 1962), tenor
- Thurston Dart (1921–1971), performer and musicologist
- Ray Davies (1927–2017), trumpeter and bandleader
- Sir Andrew Davis (born 1944), conductor
- Sir Colin Davis (1927–2013) conductor
- Alexandre Desplat (born 1961), film composer
- Margaret Douglas-Home (1906–1996), pianist
- Julius Drake (born 1959), pianist and accompanist
- Madeleine Dring (1923–1977), 1945 ARCM (Piano), composer
- George Dyson (1883–1964), composer
- Daniel Elms (born 1985), composer
- David Fanshawe (1942–2010), composer and ethnomusicologist
- Dominic Ferris (born 1985), pianist
- Michael Finnissy (born 1946), composer
- Sarah Fischer (1896–1975), soprano
- Leonard N. Fowles (1870–1939), composer, organist and choirmaster
- Sarah Fox (born 1973), soprano
- Herbert Fryer (1877–1957), pianist
- Megumi Fujita of the Fujita Piano Trio
- Sir James Galway (born 1939), flautist
- Bernard Garfield (1924–2025), bassoonist and composer
- Noel Gay (1898–1954), songwriter
- Helen Gilliland (1897-1942), actress and singer
- Jane Glover (born 1949), conductor
- Walter Glynne (1890-1945), operatic tenor
- Robert John Godfrey (born 1947), composer and pianist
- Malcolm Goldring oboist, conductor
- Sir Eugene Goossens (1893–1962), conductor
- Léon Goossens (1897–1988), oboist
- Anna Green (born 1933), soprano
- Sir Charles Groves (1915–1992), conductor
- Douglas Guest (1916–1996), organist and choirmaster
- Richard Harvey (born 1953), composer and multi-instrumentalist
- David Helfgott (born 1947), pianist
- Naftali Hershtik (born 1960), cantor
- Kenneth Hesketh (born 1968), composer
- Georgette Heyer (1902–1974), historical novelist
- Gustav Holst (1874–1934), composer
- Nicholas Hooper (born 1952), film-composer
- James Horner (1953–2015), film-composer
- Dani Howard (born 1993), composer
- Jeremy Dale Roberts (1934–2017), composer
- Josef Horovitz (born 1926), composer
- Herbert Howells (1892–1983), composer
- Owain Arwel Hughes (born 1942), conductor
- Walter Hyde (1875–1951), operatic tenor
- William Hurlstone (1876–1906), composer
- John Ireland (1879–1962), composer and pianist
- Gordon Jacob (1895–1984), composer
- Georges Jacobi (1840–1906), composer and conductor
- Olga Jegunova (born 1984), pianist
- Dame Gwyneth Jones (born 1936), Wagnerian soprano
- Bryan Kelly (1934–2026), composer
- Hannah Kendall (born 1985), composer
- Dame Thea King (1925–2007), clarinetist
- Jason Kouchak (born 1969), composer and pianist
- Constant Lambert (1905–1951), composer and critic
- Gabrielle Lambrick (1913–1968), educator and historian
- George-Emmanuel Lazaridis (born 1978), pianist
- Rowland Lee (born 1960), composer, pianist and music arranger
- John Lill (born 1944), pianist
- Roger Lord (1924–2014), oboist with London Symphony Orchestra
- Natalia Luis-Bassa (born 1966), conductor
- David Lyn (1927–2012), actor
- Sir Neville Marriner (1924-2016), conductor
- Colin Mawby (1936–2019), organist, choral conductor and composer
- Sir William McKie (1901–1984), organist and choir director
- Andrew March (born 1973), composer
- Susan Milan (born 1940), flautist
- Carlos Miranda (born 1945), composer
- Johannes Möller (born 1981), guitarist and composer
- Luke Mombrea, composer
- Francis Monkman (born 1949), rock, classical and film-composer
- Philip Moore (born 1943), organist and composer
- Ludovic Morlot (born 1974), conductor
- David Moule-Evans (1905–1988), composer
- Tokio Myers (born 1984), pianist
- Stuart Nicholson (born 1975), organist
- Steve Nieve (born 1958), keyboardist
- Aydin Önaç (born c. 1950), pianist, teacher, headteacher
- Sir Hubert Parry (1848–1918), composer
- Ian Partridge (born 1938), tenor
- Alex Paxton (born 1990), composer, trombonist
- Peter Pears (1910–1986), singer
- Kevin Penkin (born 1992), anime, film and video game composer
- "Mika" Michael Penniman (born 1983), popular singer-songwriter
- Trevor Pinnock (born 1946), harpsichordist and conductor
- Clement Power (born 1980), conductor
- Julie Price (born 1963), bassoonist
- Surendran Reddy (1962–2010), composer and pianist
- Achille Rivarde (1865–1940), violinist and teacher
- Clara Rodríguez (born 1970), student and teaching professor.
- Bernard Rose (1916–1996), academic, Organist and Master of the Choristers, Magdalen College, Oxford
- Gilbert Rowland (born 1946), harpsichordist
- Isyana Sarasvati (born 1993), singer and songwriter
- Malcolm Sargent (1895–1967), conductor
- Bruno Schrecker (1928–2026), cellist
- Paul Schwartz (born 1956), producer, composer, conductor and pianist
- Frederick Sharp (1911–1988), baritone
- Howard Shelley (born 1950), pianist
- Cyril Smith (1909–1974), pianist
- Laura Snowden (born 1989), guitarist and composer
- Philip Sparke (born 1951), composer and conductor
- Edna Stern (born 1977), pianist
- Bryceson Treharne (1877-1949), composer and pianist
- Maxim Vengerov (born 1974), Russian-born Israeli violinist, violist, and conductor
- Charles Villiers Stanford (1852–1924), composer
- Sophie Viney (born 1974), composer, arranger and pianist
- Albert Visetti (1846–1928), composer, conductor and teacher
- Leopold Stokowski (1882–1977), conductor
- Joan Sutherland (1926–2010), singer
- Christopher Tin (born 1976), composer
- Michael Tippett (1905–1998), composer
- Mark-Anthony Turnage (born 1960), composer
- Nick van Bloss (born 1967), pianist and author
- Vanessa-Mae (born 1978), violinist
- Rick Wakeman (born 1949), keyboardist
- Bernard Walton (1917–1972), clarinetist
- William Waterhouse (1931–2007), bassoonist and musicologist
- Fanny Waterman (1920–2020), founding director of the Leeds International Pianoforte Competition
- Darryl Way (born 1948), rock and classical musician
- Andrew Lloyd Webber (born 1948), composer
- Julian Lloyd Webber (born 1951), cellist
- William Lloyd Webber (1914–1982), organist and composer
- Gillian Weir (born 1941), organist
- Grace Williams (1906–1977), composer
- John Williams (born 1941), guitarist
- Nardus Williams, soprano singer
- Ralph Vaughan Williams (1872–1958), composer
- Laura Wright (born 1990), singer
- Martin Yates (born 1958), conductor
