= The Offies =

British theatre award

The Off West End Theatre Awards
- Abbreviation: The Offies
- Formation: 2010; 16 years ago
- Type: Independent Theatre Awards
- Purpose: Excellence in Off West End Theatre
- Region served: United Kingdom
- Official language: English
- Patron: Kathy Burke (since 2010)
- Founders: Sofie Mason & Diana Jervis-Read
- Chief Executive: Denholm Spurr (since 2024)
- Staff: 2
- Volunteers: approximately 60
- Website: offies.london; www.offwestend.com

The Offies, formally called The Off West End Theatre Awards, is an annual awards ceremony launched in 2010 by OffWestEnd to recognise and celebrate excellence, innovation and ingenuity of independent Off West End theatres across London. The awards recognise productions staged outside the commercial West End and highlight the work of emerging and established artists, companies, and creative teams.

== History ==
The OffWestEnd Theatre Awards were launched in 2010 by Sofie Mason and Diana Jervis-Read to commemorate and recognise on and off-stage talent within the theatre industry of around 80 of London's independent Off West End theatres. The first-ever award ceremony for The Offies was held on 27 February 2011 with Simon Callow hosting the event. The aim of the awards is to help raise the profile and status of independent theatres in London by rewarding productions not eligible for the Society of London Theatre-Laurence Olivier Awards. The winners are selected by a panel of theatre critics.

In 2014, Phoebe Waller-Bridge won two Off West End Theatre awards for her one-woman show Fleabag at the Soho Theatre.

In 2017, Geoffrey Brown replaced Sophie Mason and Diana Jervis-Read as director. In 2024, Denholm Spurr became the director.

Many shows recognized by OffWestEnd have gone on to transfer to the West End, Broadway, and beyond. They include Fleabag, Operation Mincemeat, and Kenrex, among others.

== Ceremony ==
Date	Award Ceremony Host	Awards Venue	Ref.
27 February 2011	Simon Callow	Wilton's Music Hall, Shadwell	
5 February 2012	Louise Jameson	Theatre Royal Stratford East	
24 February 2013	Simon Callow	Battersea Arts Centre	
2 March 2014	Louise Jameson	Unicorn Theatre, Southwark	
20 April 2015	Louise Jameson	Online	
28 February 2016	Ian McKellen (via Twitter)	Theatre Royal Stratford East	
26 February 2017	Patrick Stewart (via Twitter)	Online	
4 March 2018	Amy Lamé	Albany Theatre, Deptford	
31 May 2019	Geoffrey Brown	Battersea Arts Centre	
8 March 2020	Host; Geoffrey Brown Presenters; Lyn Gardner, Danielle Tarento, Julie Ward, Winsome Pinnock, Lynette Linton	Battersea Arts Centre	
21 February 2021	Geoffrey Brown	Online	
20 February 2022	Geoffrey Brown	Online	
12 February 2023	Geoffrey Brown	Alexandra Palace Theatre	
25 February 2024	Geoffrey Brown	Woolwich Works	
17 March 2025	Davina Di Campo	Central Hall Westminster	
30 March 2026	Davina Di Campo	Central Hall Westminster	

== Notable winners ==
The following tables highlight selected notable winners and finalists from each year of the Offies.

Year	Recipients
2011	Producer: Will Young and Ben Monks – Supporting Wall(Finalist); Set Design: Ultz – Blue/Orange (Nominee); Ultz – The Beauty Queen of Leenane(Winner); New Play: Torben Betts – The Company Man (Nominee); Tim Luscombe – Hungry Ghosts (Nominee); Nina Raine – Tribes (Winner); James Graham – The Whisky Taster(Finalist); Most Promising New Playwright: Tom Wells – Me, As A Penguin (Finalist); Costume Design: Tom Scutt – Dick Whittington and His Cat (Nominee); Director: Tim Luscombe – Hungry Ghosts (Nominee); Thom Southerland – Singin' in the Rain (Nominee) Thom Southerland – Me and Juliet (Winner); Natalie Abrahami – How To Be An Other Woman (Nominee); Matthew Dunster – The Maddening Rain (Nominee); Female: Sinead Matthews – Lulu (Nominee); Sinead Matthews – The Glass Menagerie (Nominee); Michelle Terry – Tribes (Winner); Janet Suzman – Dream of the Dog (Finalist); Isla Blair – The Company Man (Nominee); Lighting Design: Paule Constable – Blasted (Finalist); Male: Olly Alexander – The Aliens (Nominee)
2012	Producer: [Will Young] and Ben Monks – Supporting Wall (Finalist); Danielle Tarento – Producer (Winner); Female: Vinette Robinson – Tender Napalm (Winner); Shannon Tarbet – Mogadishu (Nominee); Lisa Dillon – Knot of the Heart (Finalist); Lily James – Vernon God Little (Nominee); Denise Gough – The Painter (Nominee); Alice Birch – Many Moons (Nominee); New Play: Tom Wells – The Kitchen Sink (Finalist); David Eldridge – Knot of the Heart (Winner); Set Design: Tom Scutt – Mogadishu (Nominee); Male: Tom Byam Shaw – Foxfinder (Nominee); Toby Jones – The Painter (Nominee); David Mercatali – Director of Tender Napalm (Nominee – counted under directing); Bronagh Lagan – Henry VI Part I (Nominee – counted under directing); Adrian Lukis – As You Like It (Nominee); Director: Rufus Norris – Vernon God Little (Nominee); Paul Taylor-Mills – The Best Little Whorehouse in Texas (Nominee); Nicholas Kent – Tactical Questioning (Nominee); Matthew Dunster – Tender Napalm (Nominee); Guy Retallack – Thrill Me (Nominee); David Byrne – Artistic Director (Nominee); Che Walker – Danny and the Deep Blue Sea (Nominee); Blanche McIntyre – The Accolade (Winner); Carrie Cracknell – Electra (Nominee); Adam Brace and Sebastian Armesto – Four Stage of Cruelty (Nominee); Choreographer: Lee Proud – Guys & Dolls (Finalist); Drew McOnie – Dames at Sea (Finalist); Lighting Design: Howard Hudson – Bed and Sofa (Nominee); Howard Hudson – Noel and Gertie (Nominee); Howard Hudson – Burlesque (Winner); Howard Hudson – Ragtime (Winner); Howard Hudson – The Hired Man (Winner); Most Promising New Playwright: Alice Birch – Many Moons (Nominee)
2013	Male: Tom Rhys Harries – Torch Song Trilogy (Nominee); Harry Melling – I Am a Camera (Nominee); Andrew Gower – The Conquest of the South Pole (Nominee); Alan Cox – Cornelius (Nominee); Director: Stephen Unwin – The Conquest of the South Pole (Nominee); Sam Yates – Cornelius (Nominee); Paul Taylor-Mills – Steel Pier (Nominee); Bill Buckhurst – Barbarians (Nominee); New Play: Nick Payne – One Day When We Were Young (Nominee); Sound Design: Max Pappenheim – Kafka v Kafka (Nominee); Female: Marianne Oldham – You Can Still Make a Killing (Nominee); Lucy Ellinson – Oh, The Humanity (Finalist); Laura Pitt-Pulford – Mack and Mabel (Nominee); Kathryn Hunter – The Bee (Nominee); Jenny Rainsford – Straight (Nominee); Hattie Morahan – The Dark Earth and the Light Sky (Nominee); Eileen Atkins – All That Fall (Winner); Aysha Kala – Khadija is 18 (Finalist); Aimie Atkinson – Steel Pier (Nominee); Choreographer: Lee Proud – Boy Meets Boy (Nominee); Lee Proud – Victor/Victoria (Nominee); Lee Proud – Mack and Mabel (Winner); Drew McOnie – Dames at Sea (Finalist); Producer: Danielle Tarento – Producer (Finalist); Most Promising New Playwright: Caroline Bird – The Trojan Women (Finalist)
2014	New Play: Will Adamsdale – The Victorian in the Wall (Nominee); Luke Barnes – Bottleneck (Finalist); Phoebe Waller-Bridge – Fleabag (Nominee); Frank McGuinness – The Match Box (Winner); Arinzé Kene – God's Property (Nominee); Most Promising New Playwright: Tori Allen-Martin and Sarah Henley – Streets (Nominee); Phoebe Waller-Bridge – Fleabag (Winner); Female: Sinéad Matthews – Trout Stanley (Nominee); Phoebe Waller-Bridge – Fleabag (Winner); Lucy Ellinson – Grounded (Finalist); Louise Jameson – Gutted (Nominee); Leanne Best – The Match Box (Finalist); Emma Rice – Steptoe & Son (Nominee); Cush Jumbo – Josephine & I (Nominee); Cressida Carre – Titanic (Nominee); Celia Graham – Titanic (Nominee); Director: Phyllida Lloyd – Josephine & I (Nominee); Paul Robinson – Land of Our Fathers (Finalist); Max Pappenheim – Nothing Is the End of the World (Finalist); Lucy Ellinson – Grounded (Nominee); Howard Hudson – Titanic (Nominee); Emma Rice – Steptoe & Son (Nominee); Artistic Director: Paul Robinson – Land of Our Fathers (Finalist); David Byrne – Artistic Director (Winner); Set Design: Oliver Townsend – Grounded (Winner); David Woodhead – Lizzie Siddal (Nominee); Costume Design: Howard Hudson – Lizzie Siddal (Winner); David Woodhead – Titanic (Winner); Lighting Design: Howard Hudson – Lizzie Siddal (Winner); Howard Hudson – Titanic (Winner); Choreographer: Cressida Carré – Titanic (Winner); TBC Award: Phoebe Waller-Bridge – Fleabag (Winner); Bryony Kimmings – Credible Likeable Superstar Role Model (Finalist); Forced Entertainment – Tomorrow's Parties (Winner); Sound Design: Ben Ringham, Max Ringham & David Rosenberg (theatre) – Ring (Winner); Musical Production: Titanic – Southwark Playhouse (Winner); Production: Grounded – Gate Theatre (Winner)
2015	Female: Victoria Hamilton-Barritt – The Heights (Nominee); Phoebe Waller-Bridge – The One (Nominee); Linda Bassett – Visitors (Winner); Gemma Whelan – Dark Vanilla Jungle (Nominee); Male: Robin Soans – Visitors (Finalist); Harry Lloyd – Notes From Underground (Finalist); New Play: Torben Betts – Invincible (Nominee); Nick Payne – Incognito (Nominee); Barney Norris – Visitors (Finalist); Che Walker – Klook's Last Stand (Nominee); Bill Buckhurst – Sweeney Todd (Nominee); Alistair McDowall – Pomona (Winner); Alexander Zeldin – Beyond Caring (Nominee); Most Promising New Playwright: Shaun Kitchener – Positive (Nominee); Alistair McDowall – Pomona (Nominee); Alexander Zeldin – Beyond Caring (Nominee); Supporting Male: Simon Scardifield – Punishment Without Revenge (Finalist); Director: Seb Harcombe – A Bright Room Called Day (Nominee); Paul Robinson – A Handful of Stars (Nominee); Paul Robinson – Land of Our Fathers (Finalist); Ned Bennett – Pomona (Winner); Jenny Eastop – Warde Street (Nominee); James Dacre – The Body of an American (Nominee); Guy Retallack – MacBeth (Nominee); David Mercatali – Dark Vanilla Jungle (Finalist); David Mercatali – Johnny Got His Gun (Nominee); Christopher Haydon – The Edge of Our Bodies (Nominee); Che Walker – Klook's Last Stand (Nominee); Bill Buckhurst – Sweeney Todd (Nominee); Belinda Lang – This Was A Man (Nominee); Artistic Director: Paul Robinson – Land of Our Fathers (Finalist); Set Design: Howard Hudson – The Heights (Finalist); David Woodhead – Visitors (Nominee); Lighting Design: Howard Hudson – Titanic (Finalist); Christopher Nairne – Johnny Got His Gun (Nominee); Sound Design: Max Pappenheim – Johnny Got His Gun (Nominee); Max Pappenheim – Martine (Nominee); Isobel Waller-Bridge – Incognito (Winner); Choreographer: Lee Proud – Carousel (Finalist); Drew McOnie – The Heights (Winner); TBC Award: Forced Entertainment – Tomorrow's Parties (Winner); Production: Titanic – Southwark Playhouse (Winner)
2016	Director: Thom Southerland – Grand Hotel (Nominee); Russell Labey – Gods and Monsters (Nominee); Gary Lloyd – Carrie (Nominee); Gary Lloyd – Carrie (Nominee – second production listing); Christopher Nairne – The Edge Of Our Bodies (Nominee); Chris White – Klook's Last Stand (Nominee); Female: Samantha Colley – Klippies (Nominee); Rochenda Sandall – Little Malcolm And His Struggle Against The Eunuchs (Finalist); Gemma Whelan – Radiant Vermin (Finalist); Eleanor Worthington Cox – Tom Cat (Nominee); Clare Higgins – Clarion (Winner); Shannon Tarbet – The Edge of Our Bodies (Finalist); Male: Matthew Tennyson – A Breakfast of Eels (Winner); Harry Melling – The Angry Brigade (Nominee); Greg Hicks – Clarion (Nominee); Supporting Female: Rochenda Sandall – Little Malcolm And His Struggle Against The Eunuchs (Finalist); Natasha Rickman – The Talented Mr Ripley (Nominee); Lucy Ellinson – The Christians (Finalist); Joanne Clifton – Face The Music (Nominee); Sound Design: Max Pappenheim – My Eyes Went Dark (Nominee); Max Pappenheim – Wink (Nominee); Isobel Waller-Bridge – Incognito (Winner); Set Design: Max Dorey – And Then Come The Nightjars (Nominee); Max Dorey – No Villain (Nominee); Choreography: Lee Proud – Grand Hotel (Winner); Gary Lloyd – Carrie (Finalist); Producer: Paul Taylor-Mills – Producer (Finalist); New Play: Jon Brittain – Rotterdam (Nominee); Belinda Lang – This Was A Man (Nominee); Barney Norris – Eventide (Finalist); Supporting Male: *(no Super Notables in this category for 2016)*; Lighting Design: Christopher Nairne – Johnny Got His Gun (Nominee)
2017	Male Performance (Plays): Zubin Varla – Poison (Nominee); Richard Gadd – Monkey See Monkey Do (Nominee); Ken Nwosu – An Octoroon (Winner); Jethro Compton – White Fang (Nominee); Harry Melling – Jam (Nominee); Ben Aldridge – Run The Beast Down (Finalist); Ian McDiarmid – What Shadows (Finalist); Adrian Lukis – I'm Gonna Pray For You So Hard (Nominee); Adam Deacon – The Retreat (Nominee); Female Performance (Plays): Susannah Doyle – The Secondary Victim (Nominee); Sinead Matthews – Loot (Finalist); Sian Thomas – The Cherry Tree (Nominee); Kiza Deen – Expensive Shit (Nominee); Josie Lawrence – Mother Courage And Her Children (Nominee); Ella Purnell – Natives (Nominee); Bronagh Lagan – Promisies, Promises (Nominee); Adjoa Andoh – Assata Taught Me (Nominee); Female Performance (Musicals): T'Shan Williams – The Life (Winner); Sharon D. Clarke – The Life (Winner); Mimi Ndiweni – The Convert (Winner); Joanne Clifton – Top Hat (Nominee); Female Supporting Performance (Plays): Vivian Oparah – An Octoroon (Finalist); Sharon D. Clarke – The Life (Winner); Margot Leicester – Seventeen (Nominee); Clare Perkins – The Convert (Nominee); Miriam Margolyes – Madame Rubinstein (Nominee); Jill Winternitz – I'm Gonna Pray For You So Hard (Nominee); Male Supporting Performance (Plays): Tom Rhys Harries – Pitchfork Disney (Winner); Male Supporting Performance (Musicals): Peter Polycarpou – Working (Finalist); Cornell S. John – The Life (Winner); Director: Thom Southerland – Death Takes A Holiday (Nominee); Ramin Gray – Winter Solstice (Finalist); Ned Bennett – An Octoroon (Winner); Guy Retallack – Miracle On 34th Street (Nominee); Jamie Lloyd – Guards at the Taj (Nominee); Christopher Nairne – Design: Lighting (Nominee); New Play: Rajiv Joseph – Guards at the Taj (Nominee); Danai Gurira – The Convert (Nominee); Set Design: Max Dorey – Talk Radio / Tryst (Finalist); Rikki Beadle-Blair – Hashtag Lightie (Nominee); George Dennis – Guards at the Taj (Finalist); Frankie Bradshaw – Assata Taught Me (Nominee); Sound Design: Max Pappenheim – The Blinding Light (Nominee); Max & Ben Ringham and George Dennis – Killer (Winner)
2018	Male Performance (Plays): Wil Johnson – Leave Taking (Winner); Tyrone Huntley – Angry (Nominee); Trevor White – Building the Wall (Nominee); Timothy Harker – An Honourable Man (Nominee); Robert Costerlli – Rothschild & Sons (Nominee); Les Dennis – End of the Pier (Nominee); Irfan Shamji – Mayfly (Finalist); Henry Goodman – Honour (Nominee); Male Performance (Musicals): Neil McDermott – Eugenius! (Nominee). Male Supporting Performance (Plays): Wil Johnson – The Daughter in Law (Nominee); Paul Bradley – Humble Boy (Nominee); Nitin Ganatra – End of the Pier (Finalist); Ian Bonar – Jellyfish (Nominee); Female Performance (Plays): Veronica Roberts – The Daughter in Law (Nominee); Tricia Kelly – Caterpillar (Nominee); Teresa Banham – The Open House (Nominee); Tanya Moodie – Rasheeda Speaking (Nominee); Sinead Cusack – Stitchers (Finalist); Sheila Hancock – Harold & Maude (Nominee); Sarah Niles – Leave Taking (Winner); Monica Dolan – The B*easts (Finalist); Miquel Brown – The Play About My Dad (Nominee); Louise Jameson – My Best Gay Friend (Finalist); Louise Jameson – Vincent River (Finalist); Leanne Best – The Human Voice (Nominee); Imogen Stubbs – Honour (Nominee); Female Supporting Performance (Plays): Selina Cadell – Humble Boy (Nominee); Laura Rogers – Pressure (Nominee); Performance Piece / Short Run: Monica Dolan – The B*easts (Finalist); Most Promising New Playwright: Monica Dolan – The B*easts (Nominee); Director: Michael Boyd – The Open House (Nominee); James Hillier – Not Talking (Nominee); Special Award: Sally Wood – Producer (Winner).
2019	Design: Set (Plays): takis – Ain't Misbehavin' (Nominee); Director (Plays): Rikki Beadle-Blair – My Dad's Gap Year (Nominee); Choreography / Movement (Plays): Oti Mabuse – Ain't Misbehavin' (Winner); Female Performance in a Supporting Role (Plays): Arabella Weir – The Last Temptation of Boris Johnson (Nominee); Female Performance (Plays): Zoe Lyons – An Act of God (Nominee); Wendi Peters – Call Me Vicky (Nominee); Victoria Hamilton-Barritt – The View Upstairs (Nominee); Summer Strallen – Romance Romance (Nominee); Stacy Francis – Bare: A Pop Opera (Nominee); Sheila Atim – Time for Love (Finalist); Ryan Calais Cameron – Typical (Nominee); Ronke Adekoluejo – Teleportation (part of This Is Black) (Nominee); Robert Jones – Agnes Colander (Nominee); Richard Blackwood – Typical (Nominee)
2020	Most Promising New Playwright (Plays): Temi Wilkey – The High Table (Nominee); Lead Performance (Plays): Sam Crane – The Rage of Narcissus (Finalist); Michael Pennington – The Tempest (Nominee); Maggie Steed – The Cutting Edge (Nominee); Supporting Performance (Plays): John Hollingworth – The Sugar Syndrome (Finalist); Lead Performance (Musicals): Jessica Martin – Blitz! (Nominee). Supporting Performance (Plays): Isabella Laughland – Love, Love, Love (Nominee); Lead Performance (Musicals): Frances Barber – Musik (Winner); Lead Performance (Musicals): Dave Willetts – Rags (Winner); Supporting Performance (Plays): Alexandra Gilbreath – The Sugar Syndrome (Nominee) Male Performance (Plays): Richard Gadd – Baby Reindeer (Nominee)
2021	New Play (Plays): Young Jean Lee – Straight White Men (Nominee); Lead Performance (Musicals): Wendi Peters – You Are Here (Finalist); Performance Piece: Ronke Adékoluejo – Lava (Winner); Supporting Performance (Plays): Nancy Crane – Yellowfin (Nominee); Performance Piece (Plays): Linda Marlowe – No Fear! (Finalist); Lead Performance (Plays): John Dagleish – Cratchit (Nominee); Supporting Performance (Musicals): Jacqueline Dankworth – Indecent Proposal (Finalist); Lead Performance (Plays): Grace Saif – Athena (Nominee); Design: Sound (Plays): Gareth Fry – Psychodrama (Nominee); Most Promising New Playwright (Plays): Dipo Baruwa-Etti – The Sun, The Moon and The Stars (Finalist); Lead Performance (Plays): Daragh O'Malley – Yes So I Said Yes (Nominee)
2022	Performance Piece (Plays): Rosie Day – Instructions for a Teenage Armageddon (Finalist); Cabaret: Reuben Kaye – The Butch is Back (Winner); Performance Ensemble: Nick Mohammed, David Elms, Kieran Hodgson, Sarah Hadland – A Christmas Carol-ish (Nominee); Solo Performance (Plays): Miz Cracker – Who's Holiday (Nominee); Lead Performance (Plays): Lucy Benjamin – Here (Nominee); Performance Piece (Plays): Liz Kingsman – One Woman Show (Winner); Lead Performance (Plays): Leah Harvey – The Wonderful World of Dissocia (Nominee); Performance Ensemble: Kedar Williams-Stirling, Emeka Sesay, Francis Lovehall – Red Pitch (Nominee; Solo Performance (Plays): Haley McGee – Age is a Feeling (Finalist); Lead Performance (Plays): Dame Maureen Lipman – Rose (Winner)
2023	Solo Performance (Plays): Joseph Potter – The Poltergeist at the Arcola Theatre (Winner); Female Performance in a Musical: Liv Andrusier – Ride at the Charing Cross Theatre (Winner); Performance Ensemble: Woody Harrelson, Andy Serkis, Louisa Harland – Ulster American (Nominee); Performance Ensemble: Willow Traynor, Rosa Amos, Annabel Gray, Louisa Hamdi, Peal Adams, Afriya-Jasmine Nylander, Ellie Rose Amit – Flies (Nominee); Musicals: Supporting Performance: Tracie Bennett – How to Succeed in Business Without Really Trying (Nominee); Full Run: Plays – Lead Performance: Stephen Dillane – How It Is (Part Two) (Nominee)

== See also ==
- Laurence Olivier Awards
- Black British Theatre Awards
- Evening Standard Theatre Awards
- Critics' Circle Theatre Award
- UK Theatre Awards
- Ian Charleson Awards
- Sam Wanamaker Award
- WhatsOnStage Awards
