= Florian Hermann =

Composer in Russian Empire (1822–1892)

- Title page of the Hommage Valse
- Born: 1822; Vilnius
- Died: 1892 (aged 69–70); Vilnius
- Works: Hommage Valse, used in Dark Eyes

Florian Hermann (1822 – 1892, Russian: Флориан Герман, name is also spelled as Florian Herman, Florian German, Florjan Herman) was a composer of German-Polish origin active in the Russian Empire. Although he authored many works, Hermann is primarily notable as an author of the melody used in the music for the well-known Russian song "Dark eyes" (the composer wrote his opus as "Valse hommage", Op. 21). Very little is known about Hermann, Russian publications occasionally describe him as a French or Austrian composer.

Hermann's work as a composer spans 1870s – 1890s, according to the list available in a catalog by A. Gutheil (his company was later acquired by Éditions Russes de Musique), the earliest known publications are from A. Büttner in St. Petersburg. Hermann's other best-known composition is "Rêverie russe, Op. 2". "Valse hommage" became famous as "Dark Eyes" after an arrangement in the Gypsy style by S. Gerdal (1884); the popular rendition belongs to Adalgiso Ferraris (ca. 1910).

== Sources ==
- Fuld, James J. (2000). The Book of World-famous Music: Classical, Popular, and Folk. Courier Corporation. pp. 418, 684. ISBN 978-0-486-41475-1. OCLC 1004801063.
- Pruss, Dmitry (26 January 2018). "Ojos negros que fascinan, from 1830s to 1930s and beyond". Dmitry Pruss: tango links & lists.
