= Hostess Entertainment =

Japanese independent music company

Hostess Entertainment Unlimited
- Parent company: Sony Music Entertainment
- Founded: 2000
- Founder: Andrew Lazonby
- Distributor(s): Sony Music Distribution; Warner Music Group (Asia)
- Genre: Alternative, pop, and rock
- Country of origin: Japan
- Location: Nakameguro, Meguro, Tokyo
- Official website: http://hostess.co.jp/

Hostess Incorporated (ホステス株式会社, Hosutesu Kabushiki Gaisha), DBA Hostess Entertainment (ホステス・エンタテインメント, Hosutesu Entateinmento) Unlimited, is a Japanese independent music company that represents Western alternative artists and labels in Japan, such as the Beggars Group (4AD/XL/Matador/Rough Trade), Domino Records, V2 Records, Brassland, Virgin Music Label & Artist Services and PIAS UK Distribution. Artists signed to Hostess include Adele, Radiohead, Arctic Monkeys, Warpaint, Mogwai, Theme Park, The xx, Bon Iver and Vampire Weekend. It was founded in 2000 by Andrew "Plug" Lazonby, an alumnus of the Royal College of Music.
