= Tecwyn =

Tecwyn is a Welsh given name and may refer to:

- Tecwyn Evans (born 1971), New Zealand conductor
- Tecwyn Ifan, Welsh singer and songwriter
- Tecwyn Jones (born 1941), former Welsh professional footballer
- Tecwyn Jones (footballer, born 1930) (1930–2008), Welsh professional footballer
- Tecwyn Roberts (1925–1988), Welsh spaceflight engineer
- Saint Tecwyn, the patron saint and founder of Llandecwyn in the Welsh county of Gwynedd
- Richard Tecwyn Williams FRS (1909–1979), Welsh biochemist
