= Max Jaffa =

British musician (1911–1991)

- Born: Max Jaffe; 28 December 1911; London, England
- Died: 30 July 1991 (aged 79) London, England
- Genres: Light music
- Instrument: Violin
- Years active: 1920–1990

Max Jaffa (28 December 1911 – 30 July 1991) was a British light orchestral violinist and bandleader. He is best remembered as the leader of the Palm Court Orchestra and trio, with Jack Byfield (piano) and Reginald Kilbey (cello), which broadcast on BBC Radio. His career lasted 70 years, before he retired in 1990.

== Childhood and education ==
He was born Max Jaffe in London, England, the first child of Israel Jaffe, a Russian-Jewish immigrant, and Milly Makoff, his London-born Russian wife. Hearing the début of Jascha Heifetz in 1919 inspired him to take up the violin. After making his solo debut in a concert at the Brighton Palace Pier Theatre at the age of nine, he played in the pit of a silent cinema orchestra, to furnish background and atmosphere for silent films, while still at school. He studied at the Guildhall School of Music and Drama under Max Mossel, where he was a favourite of Sir Landon Ronald and where he won the Gold Medal.

== Early career and wartime ==
In 1928 on leaving Guildhall, Jaffa persuaded the Piccadilly Hotel in London to take him on for a two-week trial, and stayed there for five years, making his first radio broadcast in August 1929 with the Max Jaffa Solon Orchestra, aged just 17. That year he was temporarily released from the Piccadilly to play a season as leader of the Scottish Symphony Orchestra, the youngest player ever to hold the post. In World War II, he originally served as Gunner Jaffa in the Royal Artillery, but subsequently joined the Royal Air Force and became a pilot in RAF Bomber Command.

== Later career ==
Jaffa refreshed his violin playing after the war by studying with Sascha Lasserson, and soon joined the Mantovani Orchestra - he was the leader and soloist on its bestseller "Charmaine" (1951). He would sometimes play with the Albert Sandler Trio when Sandler himself was ill, and after Sandler's death in 1948 took his place alongside the other members, cellist Reginald Kilbey and pianist Jack Byfield, to form the Max Jaffa Trio. From 1956 until 1986 his concerts from The Spa, Scarborough were frequently featured on BBC Radio in shows such as Melody on Strings, Music For Your Pleasure and (most notably) Grand Hotel, on which he led the Palm Court Orchestra and was dubbed 'King of the Palm Court'. A Yorkshire Television documentary in 1986 filmed his final season as Scarborough, aged 74.

Jaffa recorded the violin and orchestra version of "Dark Eyes", written by Adalgiso Ferraris. His collaboration with Ferraris included other songs, such as "Souvenir d'Ukraine" and "Gipsy Idylle".

Jaffa was married (for the second time, in 1959) to the contralto Jean Grayston, a regular on-stage partner, and there were three daughters. They lived at 31 Elm Tree Road, St John's Wood, and at Argyll Lodge, High Street, Scalby, where there is a plaque. Grayston performed with Jaffa at his diamond jubilee gala concert in 1987 at the Queen Elizabeth Hall. As late as 1989 he formed a new Max Jaffa Trio for BBC broadcasts, with Alan Dalziel (cello) and Gordon Langford (piano). His autobiography, A Life on the Fiddle, was published by Hodder and Stoughton shortly before his death in 1991 at his London home.

His performing library, now owned by violinist Simon Blendis, includes both published arrangements and many still in manuscript, made for Jaffa's exclusive use, some by his pianist Jack Byfield. The CD Love is like a Violin: Salon Treasures from the Max Jaffa Library, has made recordings of some of this material available for the first time.

Jaffa is cited as a member of the eclectic (and fictional) "orchestra" in The Bonzo Dog Doo-Dah Band's recording, The Intro and the Outro.

== Selected recordings ==
- Palm Court Concert, Columbia 33SX 1107 (1958)
- By Candlelight, Capitol T-10220 (1959)
- Melodies You Love, Music for Pleasure MFP 1165 (1959)
- The Violin Sings, Columbia 33SX 1387 (1962)
- Moments of Melody, Pye Golden Guinea (1963)
- I'll See You In My Dreams, Music For Pleasure MFP 1017 (1965)
- Gypsy Carnival, Columbia 33SX 1227 (1967)
- Gypsy Magic Allegro ALL 863 (1967)
- The Max Jaffa Trio, Allegro ALL 846 (1967)
- Music for a Grand Hotel, Valentine VAL 8057 (1984)
