= Émile Sauret =

French violinist and composer

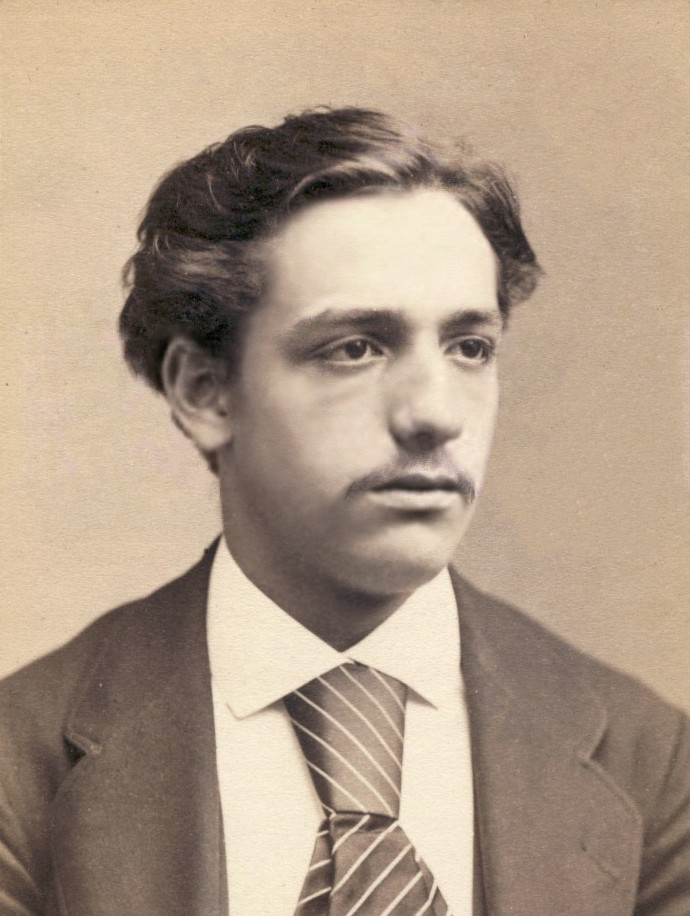
Émile Sauret

Émile Sauret (French: [emil soʁɛ]; 22 May 1852 – 12 February 1920) was a French violinist and composer. Sauret wrote over 100 violin pieces, including a famous cadenza for the first movement of Niccolò Paganini's First Violin Concerto, and the "Gradus ad Parnassum" (1894).

== Biography ==
Sauret was born in Dun-le-Roi in 1852. He began studying violin at the Conservatoire de Strasbourg at the age of six, and with a reputation as child prodigy he began performing two years later. He studied under Charles Auguste de Bériot and later became a student of Henri Vieuxtemps and Henryk Wieniawski. Aged 18, he started studying composition as a pupil of Salomon Jadassohn at the Leipzig Conservatory, where he struck up many friendships. Among these were Fritz Steinbach and Richard Sahla, a child prodigy like Sauret himself.

Sauret played in the most famous concert halls of his time. He made his American debut in 1872. Franz Liszt performed sonatas with him. In 1873, Sauret married Teresa Carreño, a Venezuelan pianist and composer, by whom he had a daughter, Emilita. The marriage did not last; in 1879 he remarried.

He held posts at a variety of institutions, including the Neue Akademie der Tonkunst in Berlin - where he wrote the Twelve Études Artistiques for his "beloved students" -, together with Moritz Moszkowski and the Scharwenka brothers, Xaver and Phillipp, and the Royal Academy of Music in London, where he was appointed a professor of violin of 1890, the Musical College in Chicago in 1903, and the Trinity College in London, an appointment he took up in 1908. His pupils included Tor Aulin, Jan Hambourg, William Henry Reed, Marjorie Hayward, Leila Waddell, Otie Chew Becker, Florizel von Reuter, Elsie Southgate, Gerald Walenn, John Waterhouse and Ethel Barns. He died in London in 1920, aged 67.

Because of the excessive difficulties of his violin compositions, Émile Sauret is remembered today for little more than the cadenza for Niccolò Paganini's Violin Concerto No. 1 in D major.

Émile Sauret played on a violin of Guarnerius del Gesù (1744), named "Sauret". In 1986, it was bought by Itzhak Perlman.

== Compositions (selection) ==
- Op. 3, Caprice de Concert
- Op. 6, 3 Morceaux de salon für Violine und Klavier
- Op. 9, Scherzo fantastique
- Op. 11, Souvenir de Los Angeles
- Op. 13, 2 Impromptus für Violine und Klavier
- Op. 24, 20 Grandes Études (1884)
- Op. 26, Violin Concerto in D minor
- Op. 27, Fantaisie brillante sur des airs espagnols
- Op. 28, Feuillet d'Album
- Op. 32, Rhapsodie russe
- Op. 33, Danse polonaise
- Op. 36, Gradus ad Parnassum (1894)
- Op. 38, 12 Études artistiques
- Op. 43, 6 Morceaux de salon
- Op. 50, Scènes villageoises
- Op. 52, Capriccio in B minor
- Op. 57, Introduction et Valse de Concert (1898)
- Op. 59, Rhapsodie suédoise
- Op. 64, 24 Études Caprices (1902–03)
- Op. 65, Souvenir de Hongrie. Andante et Caprice hongrois
- Op. 66, 3 Morceaux de salon
- Op. 67, Andante et Caprice de Concert
- Op. 68, Suite für Violine solo (1907)
- Op. 69, Chanson sans paroles et Mazurka
- Violin Concerto in E major
- Violin Sonata in A major
- Cadenza to Paganini's Violin Concerto No. 1 in D major, Op. 6
- Cadenza to Mozart's Violin Concerto No. 4, KV 218
- Cadenza to Tartini's Devil's Trill Sonata

== Bibliography ==
- Alberto Bachmann (tr. F. Martens): An Encyclopedia of the Violin (New York: Appleton, 1925)
- Andreas Moser (ed. by Hans-Joachim Nösselt): Geschichte des Violinspiels (Tutzing: Hans Schneider, 1967), vol. 2, pp. 174,176, and passim
- Willy Russ: Autographes de musiciens célèbres (Neuchâtel: Imprimerie Centrale, c. 1956)
- Stephen De'ak: David Popper (Neptune City, NJ: Paganiniana Publications, 1980)
