= The Russian Pedlar =

Song by Adalgiso Ferraris

The Russian Pedlar is a song written in 1932 by Adalgiso Ferraris. The song was written for Joseph Muscant and became one of his major successes.

The song was originally written for salon Orchestra, as many of the music of Adalgiso Ferraris . A copyrighted version for accordion is available online.

The Vocalion of November 1932

The Commodore Grand Orchestra play Ferraris
