= Joseph Potter (actor) =

English actor

- Born: 28–29; Bedfordshire, England
- Education: Guildhall School of Music and Drama
- Occupation: Actor
- Years active: 2011–present
- Known for: Nicolas de Lenfent in Interview with the Vampire (2024–present)
- Notable work: The Poltergeist (2020–22)

Joseph Potter is a British actor known for his role as Nicolas de Lenfent on AMC's gothic horror series Interview with the Vampire (2024–present). Potter began his career as a child actor and made his stage debut at age fourteen in the UK tour of the musical The Sound of Music (2011). He has performed in several theatre productions such as Oliver! (2011), Mercury Fur (2018), The Poltergeist (2020–22)—for which he received the 2023 Offie for Best Solo Performance, Salt-Water Moon (2023), Leaves of Glass (2023), and Much Ado About Nothing (2026). He made his film debut as Roy in the romantic drama My Policeman (2022).

== Early life ==
Potter was born in Bedfordshire, England and was raised in Clophill. He has two younger siblings. His brother Max is also an actor.

Potter attended Emil Dale's School of Performing Arts in Hitchin as a child. He graduated from the Guildhall School of Music and Drama in London in 2019.

== Career ==
In 2011, Potter made his stage debut at age fourteen in the UK tour of the musical The Sound of Music in the role of Friedrich. That same year, he played the Artful Dodger in Cameron Mackintosh's UK tour of the musical Oliver!, alongside his younger brother Max in the ensemble.

After graduating from the Guildhall School of Music and Drama, Potter made his professional stage debut with the role of Marchbanks in George Bernard Shaw's play Candida at the Orange Tree Theatre in London in 2019. Michael Billington wrote in his review for The Guardian: "Potter, making an impressive stage debut, captures Marchbanks's frantic impulsiveness while suggesting that, like so many of Shaw's characters, he is doomed to a martyred solitude."

In 2020, Potter starred in the world premiere of Philip Ridley's play The Poltergeist at Southwark Playhouse, which was later made available for streaming. He reprised the role at the Arcola Theatre in 2022 and he received the 2023 Offie for Best Solo Performance.

In 2022, Potter made his film debut with the role of Roy in Michael Grandage's romantic drama My Policeman.

In 2024, Potter joined the second season of AMC's gothic horror series Interview with the Vampire as Nicolas de Lenfent, a French violinist and Lestat's first love. In 2026, Potter reprised the role in the third season of the series, retitled The Vampire Lestat.

== Filmography ==
=== Film ===
Year	Title	Role	Notes	Ref.
2022	My Policeman	Roy	Feature film debut	
2024	Black Hole Barry	Robin	Short	
TBA	You Can't Keep Running	Stage Manager	Short	

=== Television ===
Year	Title	Role	Notes	Ref.
2013	All at Sea	Wenclas	Episode: "Gymnast"	
2016	Casualty	Alex Grady	Episode: "You Make Me Sick"	
2018	Father Brown	Albert 'Bertie' Granford	Episode: "The Company of Men"	
2024–present	Interview with the Vampire	Nicolas de Lenfent	5 episodes (guest season 2; main season 3)	
2025	Grace	Tim Weatherley	Episode: "Need You Dead"	
2025	Outrageous	Esmond Romilly	Episode: "Point of No Return"	
2025	Grantchester	Peter Grayson	1 episode	

=== Theatre ===
Year	Title	Role	Playwright	Company/Venue	Ref.
2011	The Sound of Music	Friedrich	Richard Rodgers and Oscar Hammerstein II	UK tour	
2011	Oliver!	Artful Dodger	Lionel Bart	UK tour	
2018	Mercury Fur	Darren	Philip Ridley	Guildhall School of Music and Drama	
2019	Candida	Marchbanks	George Bernard Shaw	Orange Tree Theatre	
2020–2022	The Poltergeist	Sasha	Philip Ridley	Southwark Playhouse / Arcola Theatre	
2023	Salt-Water Moon	Jacob Mercer	David French	Finborough Theatre	
2023	Leaves of Glass	Barry	Philip Ridley	Park Theatre	
2026	Much Ado About Nothing	Don John	William Shakespeare	Shakespeare's Globe	
