= Tecwyn Evans =

New Zealand conductor and composer

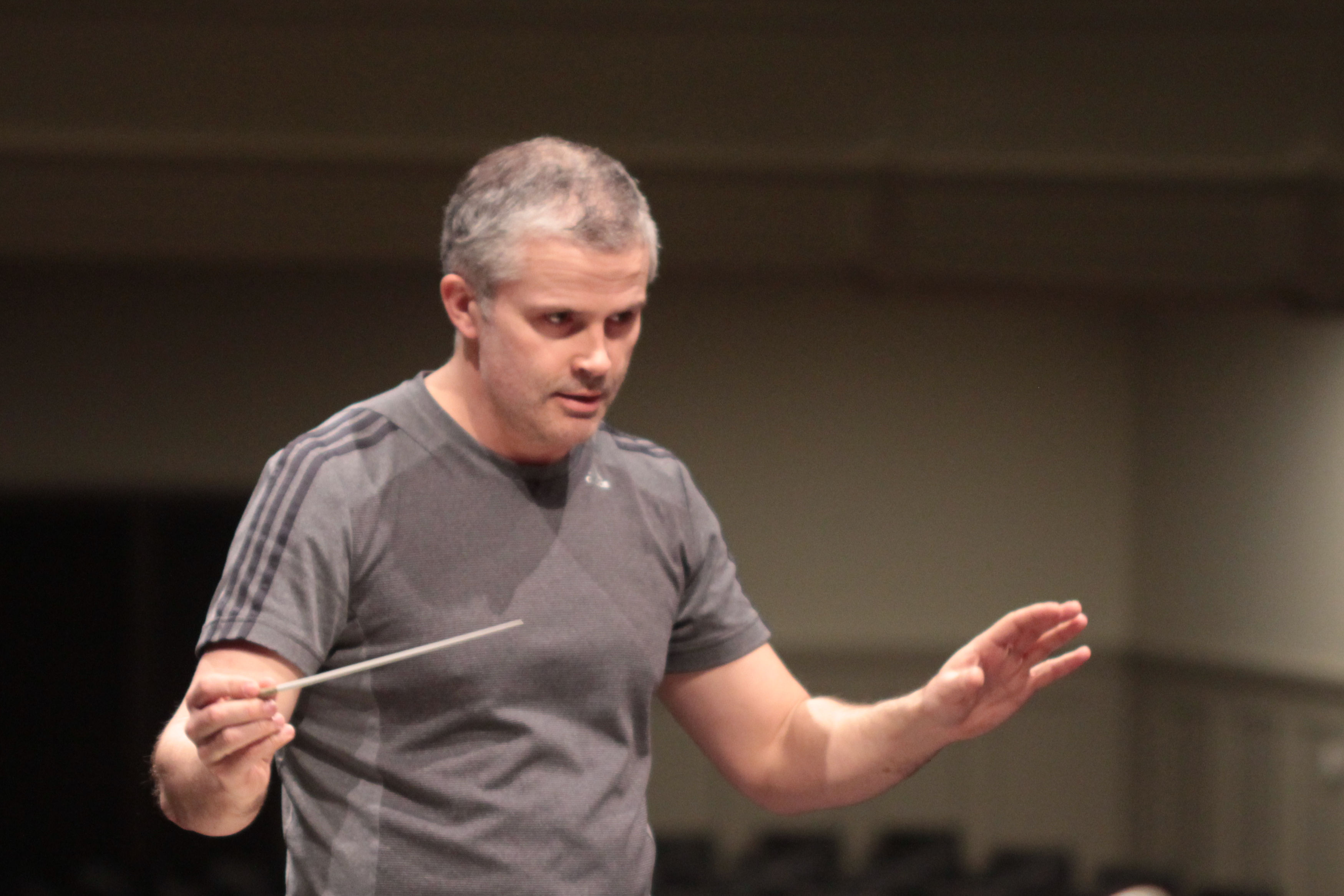
- Rehearsing the Dunedin Symphony Orchestra, April 2016
- Born: 15 September 1971 (age 55); Auckland, New Zealand
- Occupation: Conductor
- Spouse: Susanna Andersson
- Parent(s): Donald and Elizabeth Evans (née Hope)

Tecwyn Evans (born 15 September 1971) is a New Zealand conductor. He holds a faculty position teaching conducting at the University of Auckland School of Music and in 2018 he was named as Director of Music of Den Jyske Opera (Danish National Opera).

Evans has shared the concert platform with soloists including Steven Isserlis, Rebecca Evans, Jonathan Lemalu, Martin Roscoe, Anthony Marwood, So Ock Kim, Nicola Benedetti, Jennifer Pike, Marlis Petersen, Bryn Terfel, James Rutherford, Dame Malvina Major, Susanna Andersson, Nicolas Altstaedt, Peter Auty, and Elin Manahan Thomas.

Across ten countries Evans has conducted the BBC Philharmonic, the BBC National Orchestra of Wales, the BBC Scottish Symphony Orchestra, Ulster Orchestra, the Orchestra of Opera North, Helsingborg Symphony Orchestra, Nordic Chamber Orchestra, Stavanger Symphony Orchestra, Grazer Philharmonic Orchestra, Manchester Camerata, Salomon Orchestra, Dunedin Symphony Orchestra, Auckland Philharmonia Orchestra, Christchurch Symphony Orchestra, Netherlands, Queensland and Adelaide symphony orchestras.

== Career ==
=== Early life in New Zealand ===
Tecwyn Evans was born in Auckland, New Zealand, son of Donald and Elizabeth Evans (née Hope). Evans grew up in Auckland until 1977 when his father moved to Hamilton as part of his work with South Pacific Television. The family moved again in 1981, this time to Dunedin. Evans sang in the St Paul's Cathedral Choir, attended Arthur Street Primary School, Balmacewen Intermediate, and Otago Boys' High School before graduating with a BMus in Composition and Conducting, and Masters in Composition from the University of Otago studying under Associate Professor Jack W.M. Speirs. During this time he was instrumental in the development of the Southern Youth Choir, and in 1995 became Composer in Residence with the Southern Sinfonia (now Dunedin Symphony Orchestra). From 1989 to 1995 Evans was a member of the New Zealand Youth Choir and from 1990 to 1996 a member of the University of Otago Capping Sextet.

=== Early conducting and positions ===
After his studies in New Zealand, Evans left on a Fulbright Scholarship to study conducting at the University of Kansas with Brian Priestman and Simon Carrington. His career began when Sir Andrew Davis appointed him Chorus Master for Glyndebourne Festival Opera in 1999, the following year making his Glyndebourne debut conducting performances of La Bohème on the Glyndebourne Tour. From 2009 to 2011 Evans held the post of Erste Kapellmeister und Stellvertreter des Chef Dirigenten at Grazer Oper in Graz, Austria.

Evans has conducted Don Giovanni (English Touring Opera), Die Fledermaus (ETO), Fidelio, La Bohème, Pelleas et Melisande (Opera Theatre Company, Dublin), The Rake's Progress, Eugene Onegin (Royal Northern College of Music, Manchester), Hansel and Gretel (New Zealand Opera), Rotter (Oper Köln), Carmen (Gothenburg Opera/University of Otago), Madama Butterfly (Grazer Oper/Danish National Opera, University of Otago), Aida (Lyric Opera Productions), La Rondine, L'elisir d'amore, Falstaff (Opera North), Die Meistersinger, Le Nozze di Figaro, Die Csardasfürstin, La Traviata, Don Giovanni, Faust, The Queen of Spades (Grazer Oper), Maria Stuarda, Simon Boccanegra (Chelsea Opera Group).

His appearance in the final of the 2005 Leeds Conductors Competition led to his debut with the BBC Philharmonic and at the BBC Promenade Concerts at the Royal Albert Hall with the same orchestra. His German operatic debut came in 2008 stepping in at two weeks' notice to conduct Torsten Rasch's opera Rotter at Oper Köln.

Other highlights of his career so far have been a CD of music by NZ composer Anthony Ritchie with the New Zealand Symphony Orchestra, conducting the world premiere of Ross Harris's Violin Concerto no. 1 with British violinist Anthony Marwood and the same orchestra, and recording a CD with Bryn Terfel and the orchestra of Welsh National Opera for Deutsche Grammophon. He has also appeared in concert with Bryn and the New Zealand Symphony Orchestra and with the BBC National Orchestra of Wales. In July 2013, Evans conducted three world premieres of John Tavener with the BBC Philharmonic at the Manchester International Festival. 2014 saw premieres of Anthony Ritchie's Violin Concerto with Southern Sinfonia and Bella Hristova and the opera This Other Eden by Anthony Ritchie and Michelanne Forster at Arts Festival Dunedin.

=== Later positions ===
In 2015, Evans returned to the BBC Philharmonic, recording a concert of NZ and Australian music for the 2015 Anzac Day commemorations and worked with Orchestre Philharmonique de Strasbourg recording the orchestral tracks as part of John Psathas' 'No Man's Land' project. Other recent highlights include BBC New generation artist recordings with BBC NOW and soloists Pavel Kolesnikov and Narek Hakhnazaryan, Messiah with Huddersfield Choral Society and the Royal Northern Sinfonia, Messiah in Edinburgh, his Norwegian debut with the Stavanger Symphony Orchestra and performances of Gershwin's Crazy for You with Gothenburg Opera. Early in 2016, Evans made his debut with the BBC Singers and returns to the ensemble in 2017.

In January 2017 he was appointed to a two-year fixed term position at the Faculty of Creative Arts and Industries at the University of Auckland as lecturer in Ensemble Conducting.

== Personal life ==
He lives in Kvidinge, Sweden with his wife, Swedish soprano Susanna Andersson.

== Recordings ==
- A bugle will do, Anthony Ritchie/NZSO Atoll Records
- Christmas Songs, Bryn Terfel/Orchestra of Welsh National Opera/Deutsche Grammophon
- La Traviata, Grazer Oper/Arthaus Musik, Dir. Peter Konwitschny Petersen, Rutherford, Varano.
- That Blessed Wood, Rory Boyle, National Youth Orchestra of Scotland/David Hubbard EP
- This is Me, Susanna Andersson/Helsingborg Symphony Orchestra/Orlando Records

== Awards ==
- 1994 Philip Neill Memorial Prize University of Otago
- 1995 Research Master's Scholarship University of Otago
- 1997/1998 Fulbright Program Scholar

== See also ==
- Music of New Zealand
