= Dark Eyes (Russian song) =

Russian song with lyrics by Yevhen Hrebinka

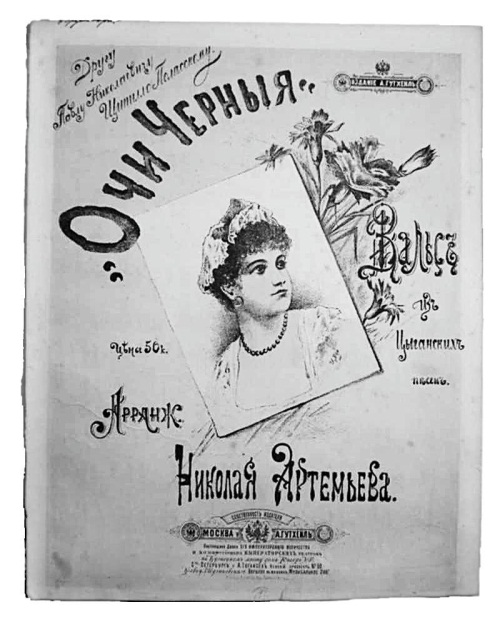
"Dark Eyes", n.d., "as arranged by Nikolai Artemev"

"Dark Eyes" (Russian: Очи чёрные, romanized: Ochi chyornye, lit. 'Black Eyes') is a well-known and popular Russian romance (sentimental art song). The lyrics were written by the Ukrainian poet and writer Yevhen Hrebinka and first published on 17 January 1843. The melody associated with the lyrics has been borrowed from the "Valse hommage", Op. 21 for piano, written by Florian Hermann and published in 1879.

The Russian singer Feodor Chaliapin popularized a version of "Dark Eyes" with changes to the lyrics and additional verses. Another popular version was written by the Italian-born British composer Adalgiso Ferraris, and first published in 1910 as "Schwarze Augen" ("Black Eyes"). The song became one of his major successes in the 1920s and 1930s.

== Composition ==
The lyrics were written by the poet and writer Yevhen Hrebinka, born in Poltava, now in Ukraine. The first publication of the poem was in Hrebinka's own Russian translation in Literaturnaya Gazeta on 17 January 1843. The lyrics were published in a songbook in 1874, but its melody was not included in the publication.

Front page of "Hommage-Valse" (1879) by Hermann

The melody now associated with the lyrics has been borrowed from the "Valse hommage", Op. 21 for piano, written by Florian Hermann, a composer of German-Polish origin active in the Russian Empire. The Op. 21 was published in 1879. In The Book of World-Famous Music: Classical, Popular, and Folk (2000), James Fuld reports that a Soviet musicologist told him that the song is not "a Russian traditional song but a cabaret song", published in 1884 and reprinted as number 131 in a songbook by A. Gutheil in 1897, where it is described as a "Gypsy romance based on the melody of Florian Hermann's Valse Hommage".

There are a number of variations on the song lyrics, including a version rewritten by Feodor Chaliapin, who dedicated the song to his future wife. Chaliapin had performed the song with Rachmaninoff on piano. Chaliapin's version became a typical example of gypsy-style Russian romance, and Rachmaninoff valued in particular a recording of the song by Chaliapin.

Another popular version of "Dark Eyes" was written by Adalgiso Ferraris, who had spent many years in Russia before 1915, and was published while he was still in Russia in 1910, in collaboration with the German editor Otto Kuhl, as "Schwarze Augen" ("Black Eyes"). Ferraris then published it again in 1931, in affiliation with Paris Editions Salabert and with Jacques Liber, as "Tes yeux noirs (impression russe)" on 9 October 1931. Ferraris himself can be seen in a British Pathé film from 1934 of Alfredo and his Gypsy band playing "Dark Eyes", sitting in the orchestra behind the lead Alfredo. His version was played by Albert Sandler in 1932, and sung by Al Bowlly, with lyrics by Albert Mellor, as "Black Eyes" in 1939. Max Jaffa also recorded a version of the song in 1967.

In Rebeca Chávez's 2010 documentary, Cuando Sindo Garay visitó a Emiliano Blez, Sindo Garay (born in 1867) claimed authorship of the melody. According to Garay, the melody of "Ojos negros que fascinan", a bolero, was composed by him upon request, for a Russian choir-girl with beautiful and expressive eyes, when an opera company from Russia came to visit Cuba in the 1890s. Garay stated that “the melody of "Ojos negros" ("Dark Eyes") went back to Russia with the musicians and it was not until many years later that he found out through a friend that the song was part of the soundtrack of a Russian film playing at the local theatre. Garay was pleased to know that his music was worthy of such merit.

== Poem (original version by Hrebinka) ==
Russian

1. Очи чёрные, очи страстные,
Очи жгучие и прекрасные!
Как люблю я вас, как боюсь я вас!
Знать, увидел вас я в недобрый час!

2. Ох, недаром вы глубины темней!
Вижу траур в вас по душе моей,
Вижу пламя в вас я победное:
Сожжено на нём сердце бедное.

3. Но не грустен я, не печален я,
Утешительна мне судьба моя:
Всё, что лучшего в жизни Бог дал нам,
В жертву отдал я огневым глазам!

Translation

1. Black eyes, passionate eyes,
Burning and beautiful eyes!
How I love you, how I fear you,
It seems I met you in an unlucky hour!

2. Oh, not for nothing are you darker than the deep!
I see mourning for my soul in you,
I see a triumphant flame in you:
A poor heart immolated in it.

3. But I am not sad, I am not sorrowful,
My fate is soothing to me:
All that is best in life that God gave us,
In sacrifice I returned to the fiery eyes!

== Lyrics (Chaliapin version) ==
"Ochi chyornye"
from Chaliapin version

Russian (Cyrillic alphabet)

Очи чёрные, очи жгучие,
Очи страстные и прекрасные,
Как люблю я вас, как боюсь я вас,
Знать увидел вас я не в добрый час.

Очи чёрные, жгучне пламенны
И мaнят они в страны дальные,
Где царит любовь, где царит покой,
Где страданья нет, где вражды запрет.

Очи чёрные, очи жгучие,
Очи страстные и прекрасные,
Как люблю я вас, как боюсь я вас,
Знать увидел вас я не в добрый час.

Не встречал бы вас, не страдал бы так,
Я бы прожил жизнь улыбаючись,
Вы сгубили меня очи чёрные
Унесли на век моё счастье.

Очи чёрные, очи жгучие,
Очи страстные и прекрасные,
Как люблю я вас, как боюсь я вас,
Знать увидел вас я не в добрый час.

Transliteration (Latin alphabet)

Ochi chyornye, ochi zhguchie
Ochi strastnye i prekrasnye
Kak lyublyu ya vas, kak boyus' ya vas
Znat' uvidel vas ya ne v dobryi chas

Ochi chyornye, zhguchie plamenny
I manyat oni v strany dal'nye
Gde tsarit lyubov', gde tsarit pokoi
Gde stradan'ya nyet, gde vrazhdy zapryet

Ochi chyornye, ochi zhguchie
Ochi strastnye i prekrasnye
Kak lyublyu ya vas, kak boyus' ya vas
Znat' uvidel vas ya ne v dobryi chas

Ne vstrechal by vas, ne stradal by tak
Ya by prozhil zhizn' ulybayuchis'
Vy zgubili menya ochi chyornye
Unesli na vek moyo schast'ye

Ochi chyornye, ochi zhguchie
Ochi strastnye i prekrasnye
Kak lyublyu ya vas, kak boyus' ya vas
Znat' uvidel vas ya ne v dobryi chas

== See also ==
- The Red Army Choir, compilation album that includes Dark Eyes
- Panon Hideung, a Sundanese folk song derived from Dark Eyes

== Sources ==
- Piotrowska, Anna G. (2022). "Tsyganshchina (цыганщина) and Romani Musicians in Tsarist, Soviet and Post-Soviet Russia: Change and Continuity". European History Quarterly. 52 (4): 554–571. doi:10.1177/02656914221097293. ISSN 0265-6914.
