= Gold Medal of the Guildhall School of Music and Drama =

Competitive music college award

The Gold Medal of the Guildhall School of Music and Drama is awarded in May of each year to the winner of the school's most prestigious music competition. The prize was founded and endowed by Sir H. Dixon Kimber in 1915, and since 1949 it has been awarded in alternate years to a singer and an instrumentalist. Gold Medals are also awarded for other aspects of the School's programme, including drama and production arts.

== List of winners of the Gold Medal ==
- 1931: Max Jaffa (violin)
- 1938: Gordon Bartlett Holdom (baritone)
- 1960: Jacqueline du Pré (cello)
- 1967: Wynford Evans
- 1974: Charles Renwick (violin)
- 1978: Iain King
- 1980: Julian Tear
- 1981: Susan Bickley
- 1982: Simon Emes (oboe)
- 1983: Carol Smith
- 1984: Kyoko Kimura (violin)
- 1985: Peter Rose
- 1986: Tasmin Little (violin)
- 1987: Juliet Booth
- 1988: Simon Smith
- 1989: Bryn Terfel (bass-baritone)
- 1990: Eryl Lloyd-Williams (piano)
- 1991: William Dazeley (baritone)
- 1992: Katherine Gowers (violin)
- 1993: Nathan Berg
- 1994: Richard Jenkinson (cello)
- 1995: Jane Stevenson
- 1996: Stephen de Pledge
- 1997: Konrad Jarnot
- 1998: Alexander Somov
- 1999: Natasha Jouhl
- 2000: Maxim Rysanov (viola)
- 2001: Sarah Redgwick
- 2002: David Cohen (cello)
- 2003: Susanna Andersson
- 2004: Boris Brovtsyn (violin)
- 2005: Anna Stephany (soprano)
- 2006: Anna-Liisa Bezrodny (violin)
- 2007: Katherine Broderick (soprano)
- 2008: Sasha Grynyuk (piano)
- 2009: Gary Griffiths (baritone)
- 2010: Martyna Jatkauskaite (piano)
- 2011: Natalya Romaniw (soprano)
- 2012: Ashley Fripp (piano)
- 2013: Magdalena Malendowska (soprano)
- 2014: Michael Petrov (cello)
- 2015: Jennifer Witton (soprano) & Marta Fontanals-Simmons (mezzo-soprano)
- 2016: Oliver Wass (harp)
- 2017: Josep-Ramon Olivé (baritone)
- 2018: Joon Yoon (piano)
- 2019: Samantha Clarke (soprano)
- 2020: Soohong Park (piano)
- 2021: Tom Mole (baritone)
- 2022: Stephanie Tang (piano)
- 2023: Alexandra Achillea Pouta (mezzo-soprano)
- 2024: Strahinja Mitrović (double bass)
- 2025: Seohyun Go (soprano)
- 2026: Caroline Durham (violin)
