= Ethel Barns =

English violinist, pianist and composer (1873–1948)

An image of Ethel Barns found in the weekly publication, the Bystander, in 1907

Ethel Barns (5 December 1873 – 31 December 1948) was an English violinist, pianist and composer. She was born in London and entered the Royal Academy of Music at as a teenager, where she studied with Emile Sauret for violin, Ebenezer Prout for composition and Frederick Westlake for piano.

Barns made her debut as a violinist at The Crystal Palace in London in 1896, and toured in England and the United States. While on tour, Barns sometimes accompanied prominent opera singer, Adelina Patti. Barns was a member of the first council of the Society of Women Musicians, which was founded in 1911. Barns became a professor at the Royal Academy of Music and died in Maidenhead on 31 December 1948.

== Early life and career ==
Barns was born in London in the year 1874 (some sources inaccurately list 1880 as her birth year). In 1887, at the age of thirteen, Barns enrolled in the Royal Academy of Music and began taking violin lessons with Emile Sauret. Barns also took up lessons with Frederick Westlake for piano and Ebenezer Prout for composition.

One of her earliest public performances took place in 1890 at the Royal Academy's St. James's Hall in a concert that featured her playing two movements from Louis Spohr's violin concerto. In 1891, she sang and performed the violin at Cadogan Gardens. That same year, she published one of her earliest works, Romance, a piece for violin and piano. After her graduation in 1895, Barns became a substitute teacher at the Royal Academy of Music and remained a student of Emile.

At this point in Barns’ early career, she had proved herself a “versatile musician” by serving as a regular violinist having played pieces by Gabriel Fauré and Martin Sarasaten and performing works such as Beethoven piano concerto. Barns was well sought-after and performed hers and others works in concert halls across London, including the first season of the Henry Wood Proms in 1895 and Crystal Palace in 1896. She was also beginning to publish her compositions, many of which she premiered, through the publisher Stanley Lucas. These early publications included works for violin, piano, and voice, such as "A Fancy" and "Waiting for Thee."

== Late career ==
Barns married Charles Phillips, a performing baritone, in 1899, having met him eight years earlier at one of her concerts. She kept her both name and career, which was not unusual for professional women of the time. The pair founded the Barns-Phillips Chamber Concert Series at Bechstein Hall, which was designed to help promote Barns' compositions. After her 1900 performance of her Violin Sonata No. 1 in D Minor (which went unpublished) at Steinway Hall, a reviewer compared hers to the works of Edvard Grieg, Anton Rubinstein, and Johannes Brahms. Barns' Violin Concerto in A Major was published by Schott, in the same year in which she premiered it at a 1904 Barns-Phillips concert. Barns expert, Sophie Fuller, described the work has a "typically tempestuous and lyrical work with rich, sonorous piano harmonies and a difficult but always violinistic solo part." Other performers also took Barns' compositions to the stage, including Joseph Joachim, who played her Second Sonata as well as her Violin Concerto, and her teacher, Emile Sauret, who performed the Barns Fantasy.

Other pieces performed as a part of Barns-Phillips series included her Piano Trio in F Minor and her Third Violin Sonata in 1908. The latter marked Barns' return to the stage having recovered from a serious illness. 1908 also saw the premier of Barns' Suite for Violin and Piano, performed by one of her publishers, Schott. In 1909, her work for violin and orchestra, Concertück, premiered at the Queen's Hall Promenade Concerts Schott saw that this work was published as a piano arrangement a year later. Between the years of 1907 and 1928, Schott published at least 35 works composed by Barns, including Chant Elegiaque (1907), Hindoo Lament (1907), Idylle Pastorale (1909), and even Eight Pieces (1910), the collection for education use. Schott then published Barns' Violin Sonata No. 4 in G Minor, Op. 24 in 1911, which had been premiered by Barns the previous year, again at a Barns-Phillips concert. 1911 was also the year in which W. W. Cobbett commissioned Barns on behalf of the Musician's Company. This piece was Fantasy Trio for Two Violins and Piano, which Barns debuted alongside her teacher, Sauret.

Barns continued composing, publishing, and performing into the late 1920s. In 1927, she performed the Fifth Violin Sonata. A year later, she published three more pieces for violin and piano.

== Selected works ==
For complete listing, see entries for Ethel Barns in The Norton/Grove dictionary of women composers and The New Grove Dictionary of Music and Musicians (citations below).

=== Orchestra ===
- Violin Concerto in A Major (1904)
- "L'escarpolette" (1908)

=== Chamber ===
- Romance (1891)
- Polonaise (1893)
- Mazurka (1894)
- Tarantella (1895)
- Chanson gracieuse (1904)
- Danse characteristique for violin and piano (1907)
- Hindoo Lament (Chanson indienne) (1908)
- Concertück (1908)
- L'Escarpolette (Swing Song) for violin and piano (1908)
- Humoresque (1909)
- Andante grazioso (1911)
- Fantasy Trio for 2 Violins and Piano, Op. 26 (commissioned by W.W. Cobbett) (1912)
- Crépuscule (1913)
- Pierrette (1917)

=== Piano ===
- Piano Trio in F Minor (1904)
- 2 Dances (1907)
- Valse gracieuse (1908)
- Humoreske (1910)
- Scénes villageoises (1911)
- An Impression (1912)
- Monkey Land (1916)
- 4 Landscapes (1919)

=== Violin ===
- Valse Caprice for Violin & Piano (1894)
- Sonata 1 in D Minor, performed 1900
- Sonata No. 2 in A Major, Op. 9 (1904)
- Sonata 3, performed 1906
- Sonata No. 4 in G-Minor, Op. 24 (1911)
- Sonata No. 5 (1927)

=== Vocal ===
- A Fancy (1892)
- Waiting for thee (1892)
- Twas Never Thus (1901)
- Remembrance (1903)
- Remember or Forget (1904)
- A Ransom (1907)
- Sleep, Weary Heart (1911)
- Berceuse (1912)
- For Thee (1914)
- Out on Deep Waters (1918)
- Idylle pastorale (1909)

=== Recordings ===
- British Women Composers: Ethel Smyth, Elizabeth Maconchy‚ Ethel Barns‚ Irena Regina Poldowski‚ Phyllis Tate. 'La Chasse', Clare Howick, Sophia Rahman, Naxos 8.572291 (2008)
- Swing Song And Other Forgotten Treasures By Ethel Barns, Nancy Schechter (violin) and Cary Lewis (piano). Aca Digital (2005)
- Idylle. May Mukle, cello; George Falkenstein, piano. Victor Matrix B-15880, 13 April 1915
- Romance and Reverie: Holst and his contemporaries. 'Valse Caprice', 'Lament' (aka 'Chanson Indienne'). Hannah Roper (violin), Martin Jacoby (piano). Albion ALBCD065 (2024)

== See also ==
- Royal Academy of Music
- Emile Sauret
- Society of Women Musicians
- The Crystal Palace

== Sources ==
- "A Woman Composer." The Bystander: An Illustrated Weekly, An Illustrated Sixpence Weekly. Devoted to Travel, Literature, Art, the Drama, Progress, Locomotion 16, no. 200 (1907): 160. London: “The Graphic” Office. Accessed 30 September 2013. The Bystander: An Illustrated Weekly, Devoted to Travel, Literature, Art, the Drama, Progress, Locomotion
- Eggar, Katharine. “Ethel Barns,” In Cobbett's Cyclopedic Survey of Chamber Music, edited by Walter Willson Cobbet and Colin Mason. 2nd ed. Vol 1: 59–60. London: Oxford University Press, Amen House. 1963.
- Cohen, Aaron I. “Barns, Ethel.” In The International Encyclopedia of Women Composers. 2nd Edition. Vol. 1: 55. New York: Books & Music Inc. 1987.
- Johnson, Rose-Marie. Violin Music by Women Composers: A Bio-bibliographical Guide. New York: Greenwood Press, 1989.
- Burton, Nigel. “Ethel Barns,” In The Norton/Grove dictionary of women composers, edited by Julie Anne Sadie and Rhian Samuel: 36–37. New York: W.W. Norton and Company Incorporated. 1994.
- Fuller, Sophie. The Pandora Guide to Women Composers: Britain and the United States, 1629–Present. London: Pandora, 1994.
- Fuller, Sophie. “Ethel Barns,” In The New Grove Dictionary of Music and Musicians, edited by Stanley Sadie and John Tyrrell. 2nd ed. Vol. 2: 745–746. London: Macmillan Press. Limited. 2001.
- Jannis Wichmann, Art. "Barns, Ethel". In: Lexikon "Europäische Instrumentalistinnen des 18. und 19. Jahrhunderts", hrsg. von Freia Hoffmann, 2014.
