= Guildhall School of Music and Drama =

School in the City of London, England

Coordinates: 51.5194°N 0.0923°W

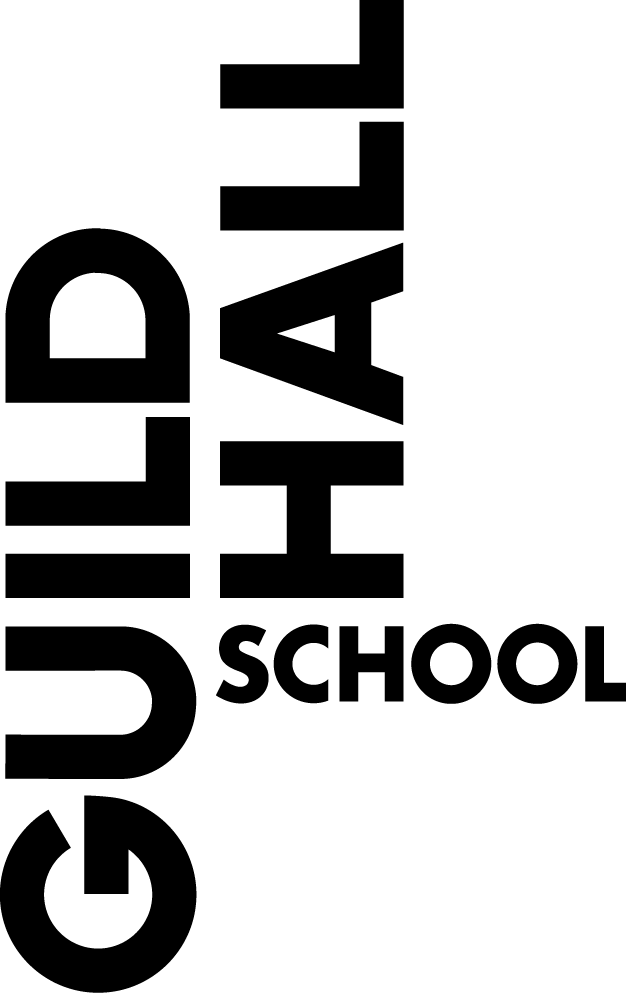
- Type: Music conservatoire Drama school
- Established: 27 September 1880; 146 years ago
- Affiliations: Conservatoires UK; European Association of Conservatoires; Federation of Drama Schools; City, University of London; Central Academy of Drama; Barbican Centre; The Royal Opera; London Symphony Orchestra; Culture Mile
- Chairman: Emily Benn
- Principal: Jonathan Vaughan
- Patron: Lord Mayor of London
- Students: 1,050 (2024/25)
- Undergraduates: 665 (2024/25)
- Postgraduates: 385 (2024/25)
- Location: Silk Street, City of London, England
- Campus: Urban
- Owner: City of London Corporation
- Website: gsmd.ac.uk

The Guildhall School of Music and Drama is a music and drama school located in the City of London, England. Established in 1880, the school offers undergraduate and postgraduate training in all aspects of classical music and jazz along with drama and production arts. The school has students from over seventy countries. It was ranked first in both the Guardian's 2022 League Table for Music and the Complete University Guide's 2023 Arts, Drama and Music league table. It is also ranked the third university in the world for music in the 2025 QS World University Rankings, as well as third in performing arts globally for 2026.

Based within the Barbican Centre in the City of London, the school currently numbers just over 1,000 students, approximately 800 of whom are music students and 200 on the drama and technical theatre programmes. The school is a member of Conservatoires UK, the European Association of Conservatoires and the Federation of Drama Schools. It also has formed a creative alliance with its neighbours, the Barbican Centre and the London Symphony Orchestra. Notable alumni of the school include Sir Bryn Terfel, Sir James Galway, Michaela Coel, Daniel Craig and Sir George Martin.

== History ==
=== 1880–1977 ===
The Guildhall School of Music first opened its doors on 27 September 1880, housed in a disused warehouse in the City of London. With 64 part-time students, it was the first municipal music college in Great Britain. The school quickly outgrew its first home, however, and in 1887 it moved to new premises in John Carpenter Street in a complex of educational buildings built by the Corporation of London to house it and the city's two state schools.

The new building was completed by 9 December 1886 and the Lord Mayor of London, Sir Reginald Hanson, attended the opening ceremony. Teaching continued under the first principal of the school, Thomas Henry Weist Hill, who eventually had some ninety teaching staff.

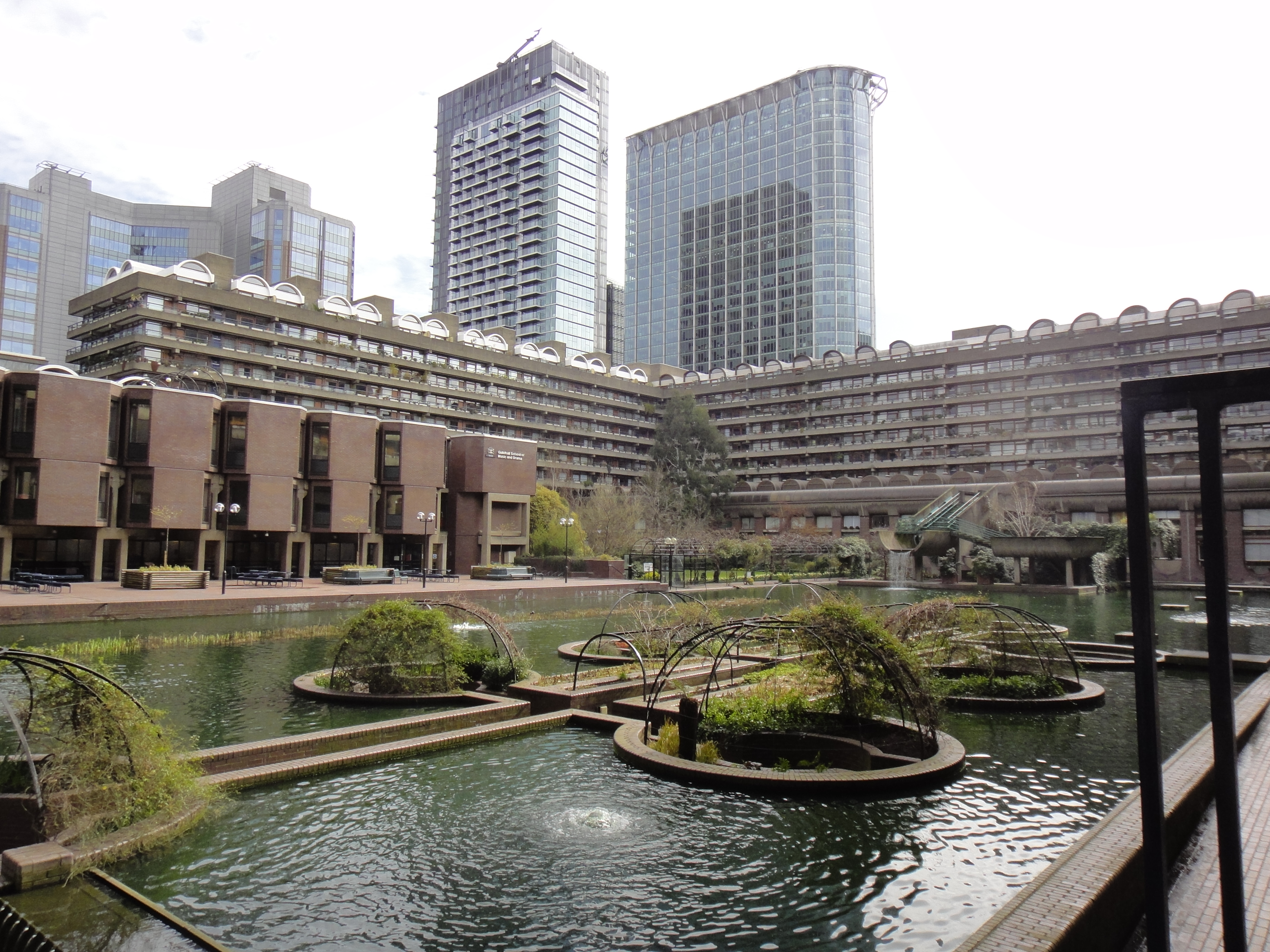
Guildhall's Silk Street building from inside the Barbican Estate

The new site, designed by the architect Sir Horace Jones, comprised a common room for professors and 45 studios, each surrounded by a one-foot thick layer of concrete to "deaden the sound". Each room contained both a grand piano and an upright piano. Additionally, there was an organ room and a "practice" room, in reality a small concert hall which was used for orchestral and choir rehearsals. The practice room was also the venue for the fortnightly school concerts

Initially, all tuition was on a part-time basis, but full-time courses were introduced to meet demand in 1920. Departments of speech, voice, and acting were added, and by 1935 the school had added "and Drama" to its title.

=== 1977–2005 ===
The school moved to its present premises in the heart of the City of London's Barbican Centre in 1977 and continues to be owned, funded and administered by the City of London.

In 1993, the Corporation of London leased a nearby courtyard of buildings that in the 18th century had been the centre of Samuel Whitbread's first brewery, and renovated and converted this to provide the school with its hall of residence, Sundial Court. About three minutes' walk from the school, Sundial Court offers self-catering single-room accommodation for 178 students.

In 2001, the Secretary of State, Baroness Blackstone, announced that the Barbican Centre, including the Guildhall School, was to be Grade II listed.

=== 2005–present ===
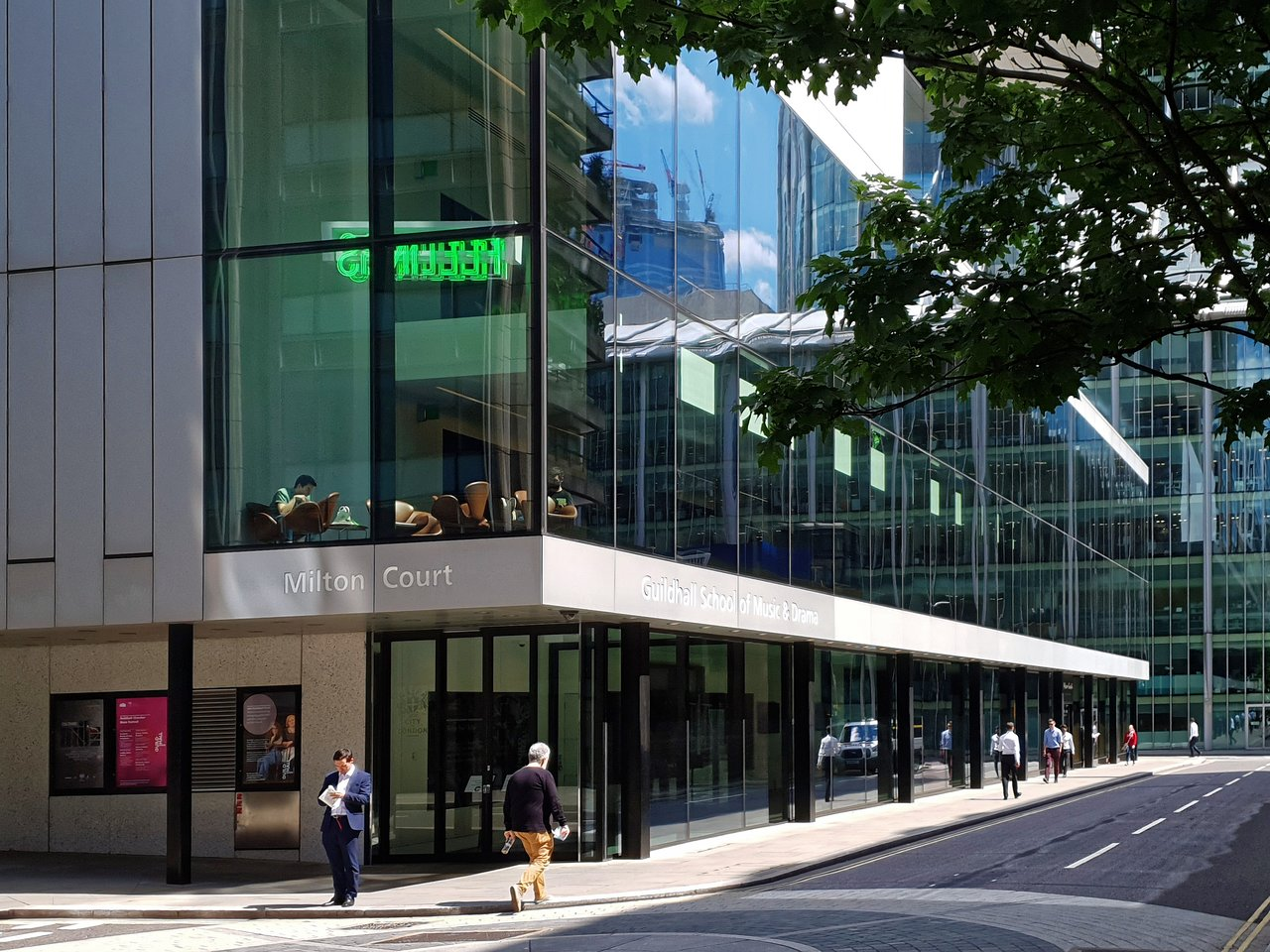
Guildhall's Milton Court building from outside

In 2005, the school was awarded the Queen's Anniversary Prize for its development and outreach programme, Guildhall Connect, and, in 2007, it won a further Queen's Anniversary Prize in recognition of the work of the opera programme over the last two decades. The school was rated No. 1 specialist institution in the UK in the Guardian University Guide 2013 and 2014.

The most significant investment in the Guildhall School's future came to fruition via the £90 million redevelopment of the neighbouring Milton Court site. The new building, which opened in 2013, houses three new performance spaces: a concert hall (608 seats), a theatre (223 seats) and a studio theatre (up to 128 seats) in addition to drama teaching and administration spaces.

The school offers both undergraduate and graduate degree programs as well as the Junior Guildhall, a Saturday school serving students from 4 to 18 years of age. The school was awarded a further Queen's Anniversary Prize in 2007 in recognition of the achievements and work of the Opera Programme.

In August 2014, the Guildhall had a logo change to a more minimalist modern style. It was changed due to the school thinking that it needed to reflect its types of teachings.

== Programmes ==
The Guildhall School was awarded taught-degree awarding powers in 2014 by the Privy Council. Doctoral degrees are validated by City, University of London.

=== Music ===
The Guildhall offers a four-year undergraduate program for musicians along with the Guildhall Artist Masters in performance or composition and the highly advanced Artist Diploma programme. Students can specialise in classical or jazz performance (either as an instrumentalist or vocalist), composition, historical performance and electronic music. At master's level, vocal students are able to specialise in Opera Studies. In addition to this, the school offers postgraduate degrees in opera writing (in association with The Royal Opera) and in music therapy.

=== Drama ===
The Guildhall School offers a three-year BA Honours in Acting preparing students for the world of professional theatre. The School also delivers the BA Honours in Acting Studies in partnership with the Central Academy of Drama in Beijing. A full time, four-year programme with two years of training at each institution, the BA Honours in Acting Studies takes in a cohort of students every other year, exploring cross-cultural approaches to acting.

=== Production Arts ===
The School also offers a three-year vocational degree in production arts where students can specialise in either Stage Management, Costume, Theatre Technology or Design Realisation. The school is one of a handful to offer specialist training in stage automation, with computer controlled flying installations in three of the venues provided by TAIT, based upon their eChameleon platform.

=== Youth Learning ===
Guildhall School offers a Saturday school for advanced young musicians under the age of 18. In addition to this, the school became the UK's largest provider of music education to under 18s by incorporating the Centre for Young Musicians (CYM) and creating new music "hubs" in Norfolk and Somerset; the school achieved recognition for Guildhall's music outreach and opera programmes through two Queen's Anniversary Prizes (2005 and 2007).

== Admission ==
Admission to the Guildhall School of Music and Drama is selective and based on competitive auditions. The school conducts music auditions in London, New York, Hong Kong, Seoul, Taipei, and Tokyo, while drama auditions are held in New York and across several UK cities, including London, Belfast, Cardiff, Edinburgh, Newcastle, Leeds, and Nottingham.

For the Production Arts course, admission is through interview at the school's Milton Court building in London, or at the United States Institute of Theatre Technology conference held each year, where prospective students meet and take part in various activities which simulate the teaching offered on the course.

In the year 2018/19, the Acting course had 2,610 applications and awarded offers to only 1% of the applicants, giving it one of the lowest acceptance rates for any U.K. higher education institution. Unlike other UK conservatoires, Guildhall operates a separate applications procedure and applications are made directly to the school, as opposed to through UCAS Conservatoires.

== Facilities ==
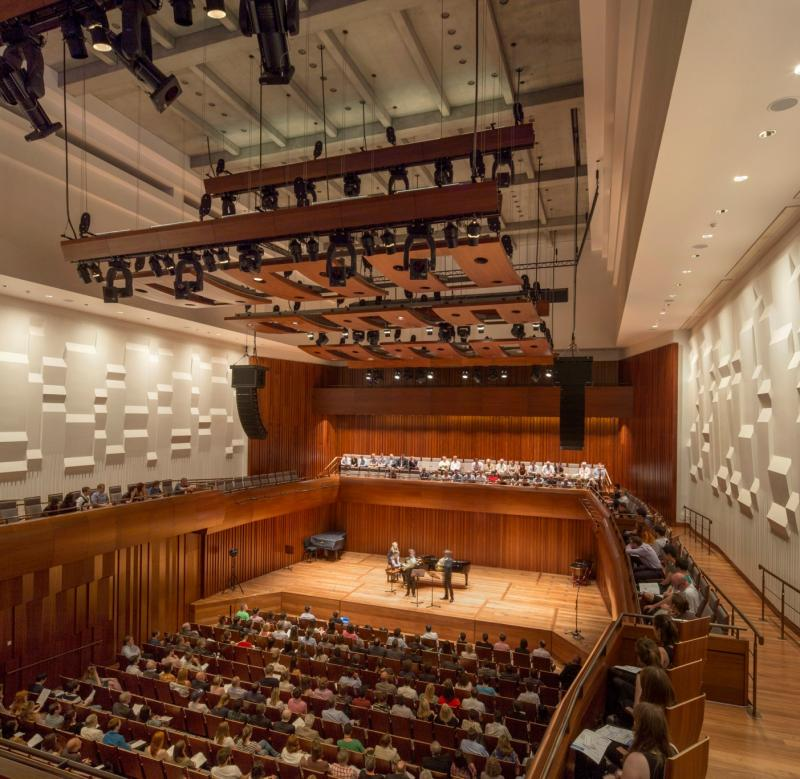
Inside Milton Court Concert Hall

The Milton Court Concert Hall is a 608-seat professional concert venue, with the largest audience capacity of any of the London conservatoires. The school works in association with the Barbican Centre to stage public performances from world-renowned ensembles, such as the Academy of Ancient Music and Britten Sinfonia within Milton Court. In addition to Guildhall's flagship concert hall, the Milton Court building also contains a 223-seat proscenium arch theatre, a flexible 128-seat studio theatre and several rehearsal rooms. The school's Grade II listed Silk Street building houses a 308-seat drama and opera theatre, along with a second smaller concert hall, a recital room, theatrical workshops and labs, electronic music studios, recording and sound studios, and over 40 teaching and practice rooms. The school also owns the John Hosier Annexe, a nearby building with a further 44 teaching and practice rooms. The Guildhall School library (located within the Silk Street building) houses one of the most extensive specialised collections of music and drama print in Europe. The Guildhall Symphony Orchestra and Chorus perform regularly in the neighbouring 1,943-seat Barbican Hall, whilst chamber musicians give recitals there as part of the acclaimed LSO Platforms: Guildhall Artists series.

== Alumni ==
=== Music ===
Some distinguished alumni of Guildhall School's music department include:

==== Singers ====
- Sir Bryn Terfel (born 1965), bass-baritone
- Dame Felicity Palmer (born 1944), mezzo-soprano
- Sir Geraint Evans (1922–1992), bass-baritone
- Roderick Williams (born 1965), baritone
- Alice Coote (born 1968), mezzo-soprano
- Owen Brannigan (1908–1973), bass
- Katharine Fuge (born 1968), soprano
- John Rhys Evans (1930–2010), baritone
- Linda Anne Hutchison (born 1945), soprano
- Anne Sofie von Otter (born 1955), mezzo-soprano
- Wynne Evans (born 1972), tenor
- Claire Rutter (born 1972), soprano
- Sophie Karthäuser (born 1974), soprano
- Nathan Berg (born 1972), bass-baritone
- Susanna Andersson (born 1971), soprano
- Alison Hagley (born 1961), soprano
- Konrad Jarnot (born 1972), baritone
- Ruby Helder (1890–1938), contralto
- Toby Spence (born 1969), tenor
- Kate Royal (born 1979), soprano
- Juliette Pochin (born 1971), mezzo-soprano
- William Shimell (born 1952), baritone
- Rebecca Caine (born 1959), soprano and musical theatre performer
- Myleene Klass (born 1978), singer and pianist
- Buddug Verona James, mezzo-soprano
- Mark Milhofer, tenor
- Peter Bording (born 1965), baritone
- Pacie Ripple (1864–1941), tenor
- Adam Smith, tenor
- Anna Steiger, mezzo-soprano
- Charles Childerstone (1872–1947), tenor
- Benjamin Appl (born 1982), baritone
- Zara McFarlane (born 1983), jazz singer and songwriter
- Camden Stewart (born 2004), tenor

==== Instrumentalists ====
- Sir James Galway (born 1939), flautist
- Paul Lewis (pianist) (born 1972), pianist
- Jacqueline du Pré (1945–1987), cellist
- Alison Balsom (born 1978), trumpeter
- Gareth Owen, pianist
- Tasmin Little (born 1965), violinist
- Sa Chen (born 1979), pianist
- Jess Gillam (born 1998), saxophonist
- Maxim Rysanov (born 1978), violinist
- Clare Hammond (born 1985), pianist
- Joan Havill, concert pianist and piano tutor
- Jennifer Pike (born 1989), violinist
- Dave Holland (born 1946), jazz double bassist
- Shabaka Hutchings (born 1984), jazz saxophonist and band leader
- Jason Rebello (born 1969), jazz pianist and songwriter
- Florian Ross (born 1972), jazz pianist, composer and arranger
- Jim Tomlinson (born 1966), tenor saxophonist and clarinetist
- Arisa and Honoka Fujita of the Fujita Piano Trio
- Rachel Podger (born 1968), violinist
- Marie Dare (1902-1976), cellist
- Emily Roberts (born 1998), guitarist and composer

==== Composers ====
- Thomas Adès (born 1971), composer
- Debbie Wiseman (born 1963), film score composer
- Sir George Martin (1926–2016), composer and record producer
- Harry Gregson-Williams (born 1961), film score composer
- Richard Mills (born 1949), composer and conductor
- John Ivimey (1868–1961), composer and organist
- Sir Noël Coward (1899–1973), playwright and composer
- Mica Levi (Micachu) (born 1987), composer and singer-songwriter
- Dobrinka Tabakova (born 1980), composer
- Adiescar Chase, multi-instrumentalist and composer
- Marie Dare, cello and chamber music

==== Conductors ====
- Paul Daniel (born 1958), conductor
- Jules Buckley (born 1980), conductor
- Albert Horne (born 1980), conductor and chorus master
- Noël Tredinnick (born 1949), conductor
- Howard Williams (born 1947), conductor
- Richard Farnes (born 1964), conductor
- David Arch, conductor and musical director

==== Musicologists ====
- Katharine Ellis, musicologist

Gold Medal of the Guildhall School of Music and Drama; list of winners of the Gold Medal

=== Drama ===
Some notable alumni of Guildhall School's drama department include:

- Naveen Andrews – (Lost, The English Patient)
- Hayley Atwell – (Captain America: The First Avenger, Agent Carter, The Duchess)
- Kingsley Ben-Adir - (Barbie, Bob Marley: One Love)
- Edna Best - (The Man Who Knew Too Much, Intermezzo: A Love Story, Swiss Family Robinson)
- Samuel Blenkin - (Black Mirror, Atlanta, Harry Potter and the Cursed Child)
- Orlando Bloom – (The Lord of the Rings, Pirates of the Caribbean)
- Peter Bridgmont – (The Mousetrap, The Great War or Z-Cars)
- Michaela Coel – (I May Destroy You, Chewing Gum, The Aliens)
- Daniel Craig – (James Bond, The Girl with the Dragon Tattoo)
- Peter Cushing – (Star Wars, Dracula)
- Michelle Dockery – (Downton Abbey, Non-Stop)
- Monica Dolan - (Appropriate Adult, A Very English Scandal)
- Kenny Doughty – (Vera, Elizabeth)
- Kurt Egyiawan - (A Real Pain, House of the Dragon)
- Shaun Evans – (Being Julia), (Gone), (Princess Kaiulani), (The Take), (Endeavour)
- Joseph Fiennes – (Shakespeare in Love, Enemy at the Gates)
- Freddie Fox – (The Riot Club, Cucumber, White House Farm)
- Tom Glynn-Carney - (Dunkirk, House of the Dragon)
- Conleth Hill – (Game of Thrones)
- Ellis Howard – (What It Feels Like for a Girl)
- Lennie James – (Snatch, The Walking Dead)
- Lily James - (Cinderella, Downton Abbey, Baby Driver, Mamma Mia! Here We Go Again)
- Anya Chalotra - (The Witcher, The ABC Murders )
- Toheeb Jimoh - (Ted Lasso, The Power)
- Sarah Lancashire - (Coronation Street, Last Tango in Halifax, Happy Valley)
- Gwilym Lee - (Bohemian Rhapsody, Midsomer Murders)
- Damian Lewis – (Band of Brothers, Homeland)
- Mirren Mack - (Sex Education, The Witcher: Blood Origin)
- Ewan McGregor – (Moulin Rouge!, Star Wars)
- Alfred Molina – (Spider-Man 2, Chocolat)
- Lesley Nicol - (Downton Abbey, East is East)
- Miriam Petche – (Industry)
- Joseph Potter (Interview with the Vampire, The Poltergeist)
- Simon Russell Beale – (Penny Dreadful, Into the Woods)
- Marina Sirtis – (Star Trek, Gargoyles)
- David Thewlis – (Fargo, Seven Years in Tibet)
- Dominic West – (The Affair, The Wire, The Crown)
- Jodie Whittaker - (Doctor Who, Broadchurch)
- Phia Saban – (The Last Kingdom, House of the Dragon)
- Matthew Broome – (The Buccaneers, My Fault: London)

=== Technical Theatre ===
Some notable alumni of Guildhall School's technical theatre department include:

- Neil Austin, lighting designer
- Judy Craymer (born 1957), producer
- Eric Fellner film producer and co-chairman of Working Title Films
- Tim Lutkin, lighting designer on Broadway and in London's west end. Creative consultant for Disney Parks & Resorts and artistic director at Dronisos done company.
