= Thom Southerland =

Thom Southerland is an English theatre director. He studied at Rose Bruford College. He is best known for his revivals of classic musicals in London, especially in fringe theatre. Along with his 2013 Southwark Playhouse production of the Maury Yeston musical Titanic, some of his best-received productions include:

- The Full Monty, New Players Theatre (2009)
- Call Me Madam, Upstairs at the Gatehouse (2009)
- State Fair, Finborough Theatre and Trafalgar Studios (2009 and 2010)
- Hobson's Choice, Broadway Theatre, Catford (2010)
- Me and Juliet, Finborough Theatre (2010)
- Parade, Southwark Playhouse (2012)
- Mack and Mabel, Southwark Playhouse (2012)
- Victor/Victoria, Southwark Playhouse (2012)
- Daisy Pulls It Off, Upstairs at the Gatehouse (2013)
- Death Takes a Holiday, Charing Cross Theatre (2017)

He was nominated for a 2012 Evening Standard Award for Parade. He received the 2011 Offie for "Best Director" (Me and Juliet).

Southerland has been nominated for Offies for "Directing": Grand Hotel (2015), Ragtime (2016), and Death Takes a Holiday (2017).
