= Otie Chew Becker =

English violinist and music educator (1880–1953)

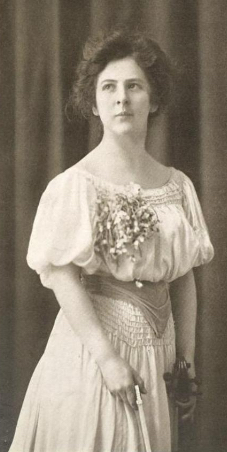
- Otie Chew, from a 1905 publication.
- Born: December 2, 1880; London
- Died: January 22, 1953 (aged 72)
- Occupation: violinist

Otie Chew Becker (December 2, 1880 – January 22, 1953) was an English violinist and music educator based in Los Angeles, California.

== Early life ==
Otie Chew was born in London, and lived in Auckland, New Zealand as a girl. Her original first name was possibly "Ottawa", based on Ottawa, Kansas, where her parents lived before she was born. Her father James Chew was a clergyman. She quickly showed musical potential. She received a scholarship to attend the Royal College of Music in Kensington at age 11. She was a student of violinists Emile Sauret and Joseph Joachim.

== Career ==
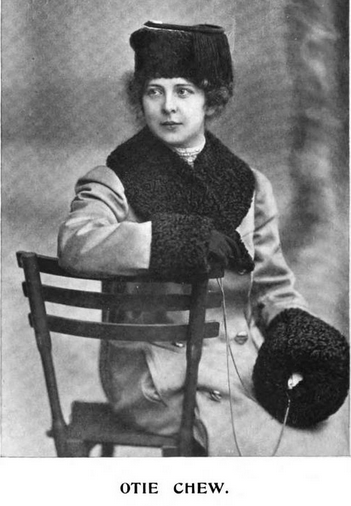
Otie Chew, from a 1904 publication.

Chew's small stature was often contrasted with her powerful sound. "Although a veritable little doll as to stature, she has the biggest and most sonorous tone ever drawn from wood and catgut by one of her sex," proclaimed arts manager C. H. Gibbons that year."She is a very petite person and it is a source of wonder to all how one with a frame so small can bring such powerful harmonies to her loved instrument," noted the Los Angeles Herald. Some early appraisals decried her youthful inexperience, as when New Music Review noted that "Miss Otie Chew played Brahms' violin concerto in an almost completely incompetent manner." The New York Times had a similar opinion of Chew's 1905 American debut, concluding that "it would be a mournful task to enumerate the defects of her playing."

In Los Angeles after 1905, Otie Chew Becker played with the Los Angeles Philharmonic, gave concerts and taught violin. Her "sonata recitals" with pianist husband Thilo Becker were much admired in the Southern California arts community.

== Personal life and death ==
Otie Chew married Thilo Becker, an Australian-born pianist and composer, in 1907. They lived in La Crescenta, California. Becker died in 1944, and Otie Chew died in 1953, aged 72 years.

As a young touring artist, Otie Chew was often photographed with her dog, Lutin.
