= The Poltergeist (play) =

2020 play by Philip Ridley

- Written by: Philip Ridley
- Characters: Sasha
- Genre: Solo performance

The Poltergeist is a 2020 play by Philip Ridley. that received the 2021 Offies for OnComm Award for "Best Livestream".

== Production history ==
The play premiered at the Southwark Playhouse in London in 2020, starring Joseph Potter and directed by Wiebke Green, who also directed Ridley's The Beast Will Rise monologue sequence.

Ridley wrote the play during the UK's first lockdown of the 2020–2021 COVID-19 pandemic. It was originally intended for a socially-distanced performance with an accompanying livestream, but was moved to a livestream-only event when the UK's second lockdown was implemented.

== Critical reception ==
The Poltergeist was received positively by critics. Greg Stewart, writing for Theatre Weekly, said: "It will come as no surprise to admirers of Philip Ridley, that he has penned another jewel in the crown of theatre, but add in a tour-de-force performance from Joseph Potter and we quite possibly have one of the most remarkable pieces of theatre of the year. With or without a standing ovation, The Poltergeist is one of those rare and unmissable pieces that will be talked about for years to come." Dave Fargnoli for The Stage wrote: "Joseph Potter's performance crackles with intensity, snapping between multiple characters at breakneck speed, mercilessly piercing every line of banal chit-chat with a tirade of caustic asides." Sam Marlowe for i wrote that it was "a terrific, teeth-grindingly tense monologue", "a typically exhilarating, wild Ridley ride, with a phenomenal motormouth performance from Joseph Potter."

== Awards ==
The Poltergeist received the 2021 Offie for the OnComm Award for "Best Livestream".

Joseph Potter's performance in The Poltergeist received the 2023 Offie for Best Solo Performance.
