= Fujita Piano Trio =

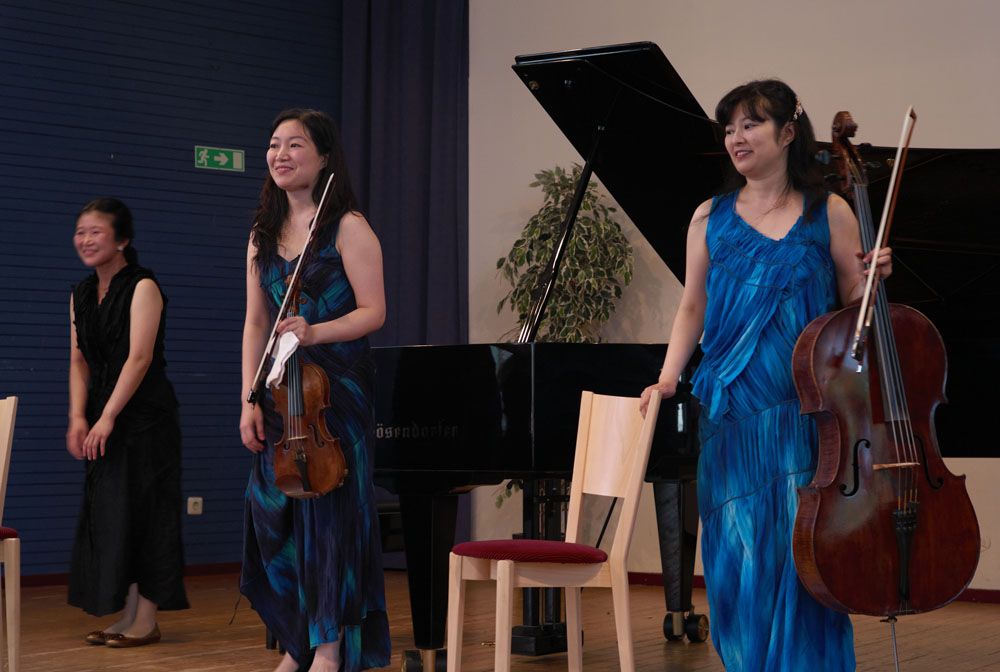
- At a performance in Sweden, 2009

Background information
- Origin: Japan
- Genres: Classical music
- Years active: 1999–present
- Labels: Intim Music, ASV Records
- Members: Arisa Fujita - violin Honoka Fujita - cello Megumi Fujita - piano
- Website: www.fujitapianotrio.com

The Fujita Piano Trio is a piano trio consisting of three Japanese sisters, Arisa Fujita (藤田 ありさ) (violinist), Honoka Fujita (藤田 ほのか) (cellist), and Megumi Fujita (藤田 めぐみ) (pianist).

== Early years ==
The sisters began playing chamber music together in early childhood. Arisa and Honoka studied at the Guildhall School of Music and Drama, London, and Megumi at the Yehudi Menuhin School and the Royal College of Music, London.

The trio received coaching from David Takeno and the Takács Quartet. They won the Chamber Music Prize at the Guildhall School in 1994.

== Career ==
They debuted at the Wigmore Hall in London in March 1999, which launched their career. The trio has performed in the UK and overseas.

The trio was awarded the 2007 Kyoto Aoyama Barocksaal Prize.

== Discography ==
- Takemitsu Between Tides etc ASV1120 2001
- Tchaikovsky Piano Trio etc Intim Musik IMCD 085 2003
- Eugène Ysaÿe Six Sonatas for Solo Violin Op.27 Intim Music IMCD 092 2005
- Rachmaninov 24 Preludes for Piano Intim Music IMCD 097 2005
- Ravel/Shostakovich Piano Trios Intim Music IMCD 104 2006
- Schubert Piano Trios Intim Musik IMCD 108 2007
- Dvořák/Smetana Piano Trios Intim Musik IMCD 112 2009
- Beethoven/Ravel/Rachmaninov Piano Solos Intim Musik IMCD 114 2009
