= Adalgiso Ferraris =

Italian composer (1890–1968)

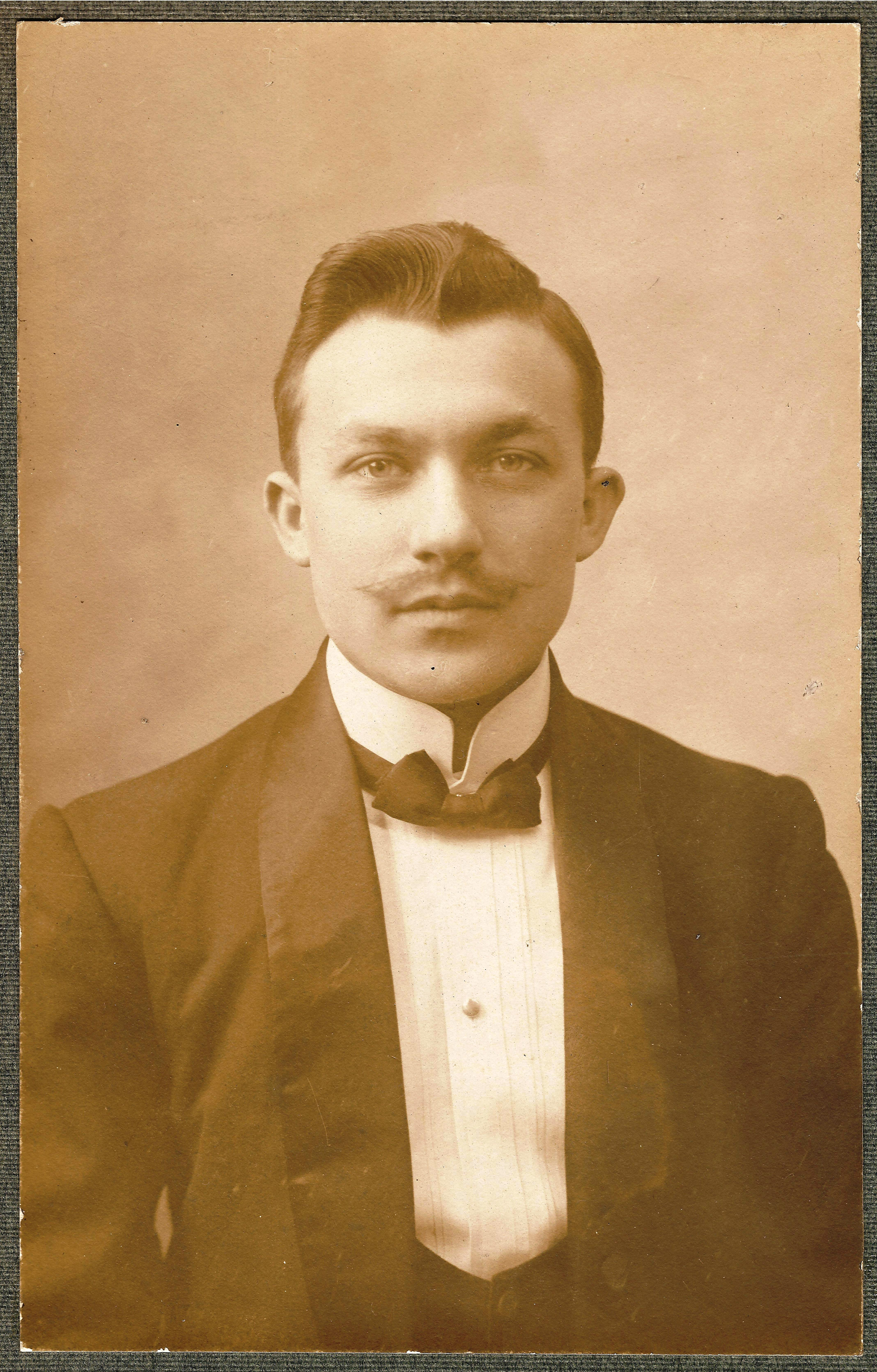
- Ferraris in 1912
- Born: Adalgiso Ferraris; 16 February 1890; Novara, Piedmont, Italy
- Died: 31 December 1968 (aged 78); Woolwich, London, England
- Education: Regia Accademia Filarmonica, Bologna, Italy
- Occupations: Musical composer; pianist
- Years active: 1910–1968
- Spouse: Adele Brunelli (m. 1920)

Adalgiso Ferraris (16 February 1890 – 31 December 1968) was an Italian-born British composer and pianist. Ferraris' arrangements and compositions were based on classical and popular genres, with a particular flavour of Roma, Hungarian and Russian traditionals. Among his best known songs are the romantic Russian song "Dark Eyes", "Calinerie", "Souvenir d'Ukraine", "the Russian Pedlar", "Two guitars", and "A Balalaika"

== Biography ==
=== Early life ===
Ferraris was born on 16 February 1890 in Novara, Piedmont, Italy. He went on to study at the Regia Accademia Filarmonica in Bologna, and studied piano and music composition with Manfredi and Crescentino.

=== Russian experience ===
In 1910, Ferraris travelled to Russia to study with Tchevnioroshy in St. Petersburg. Here, he supported his studies by playing during the capital's last years of the "belle Epoque" nightlife.

He developed his skills particularly in the piccolo concerto and especially in Tzigane music. In 1912, he becamea pianist in an orchestra which also played at Tsarskoye Selo.

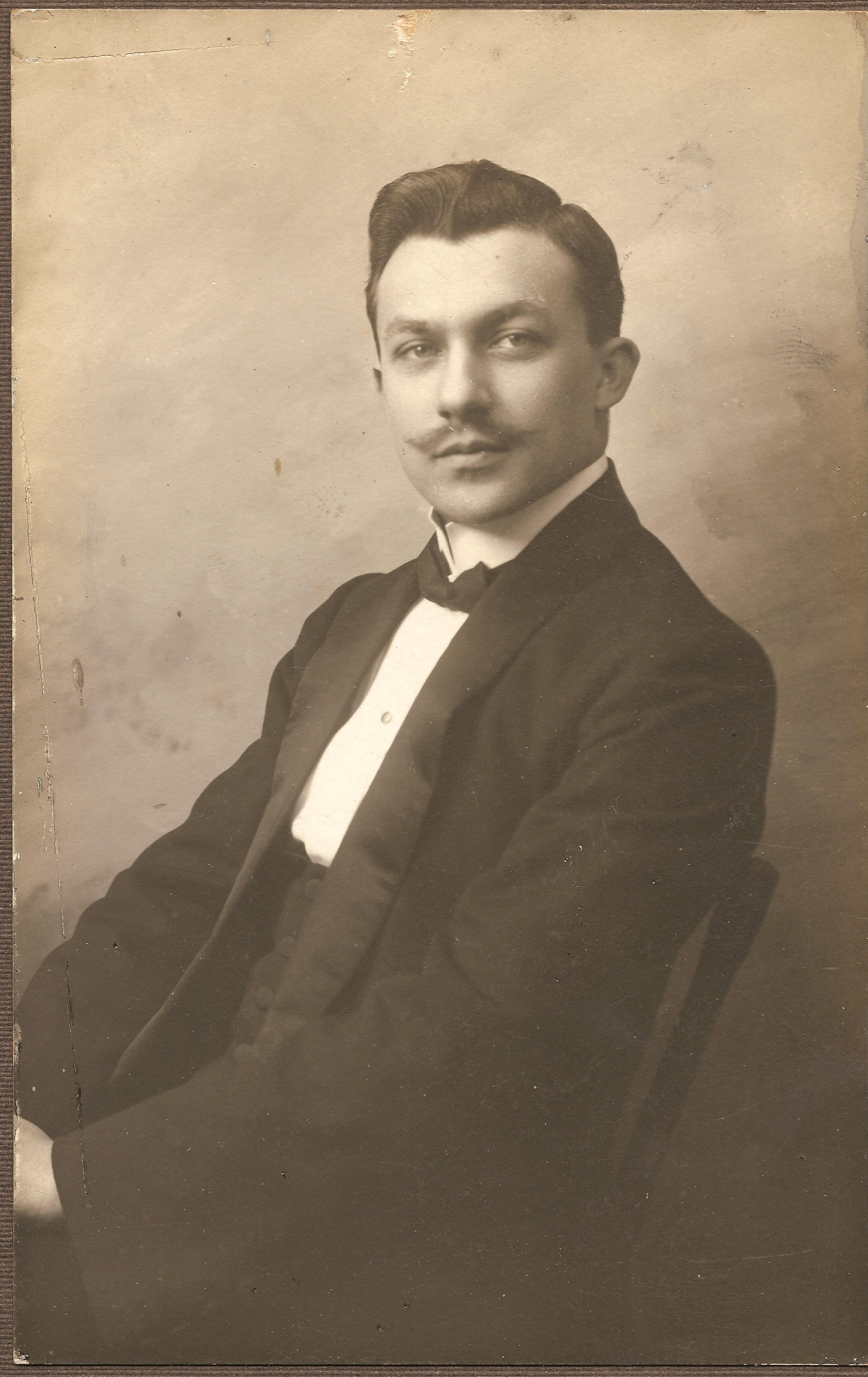
Ferraris in Petersburg, Russia, 1912

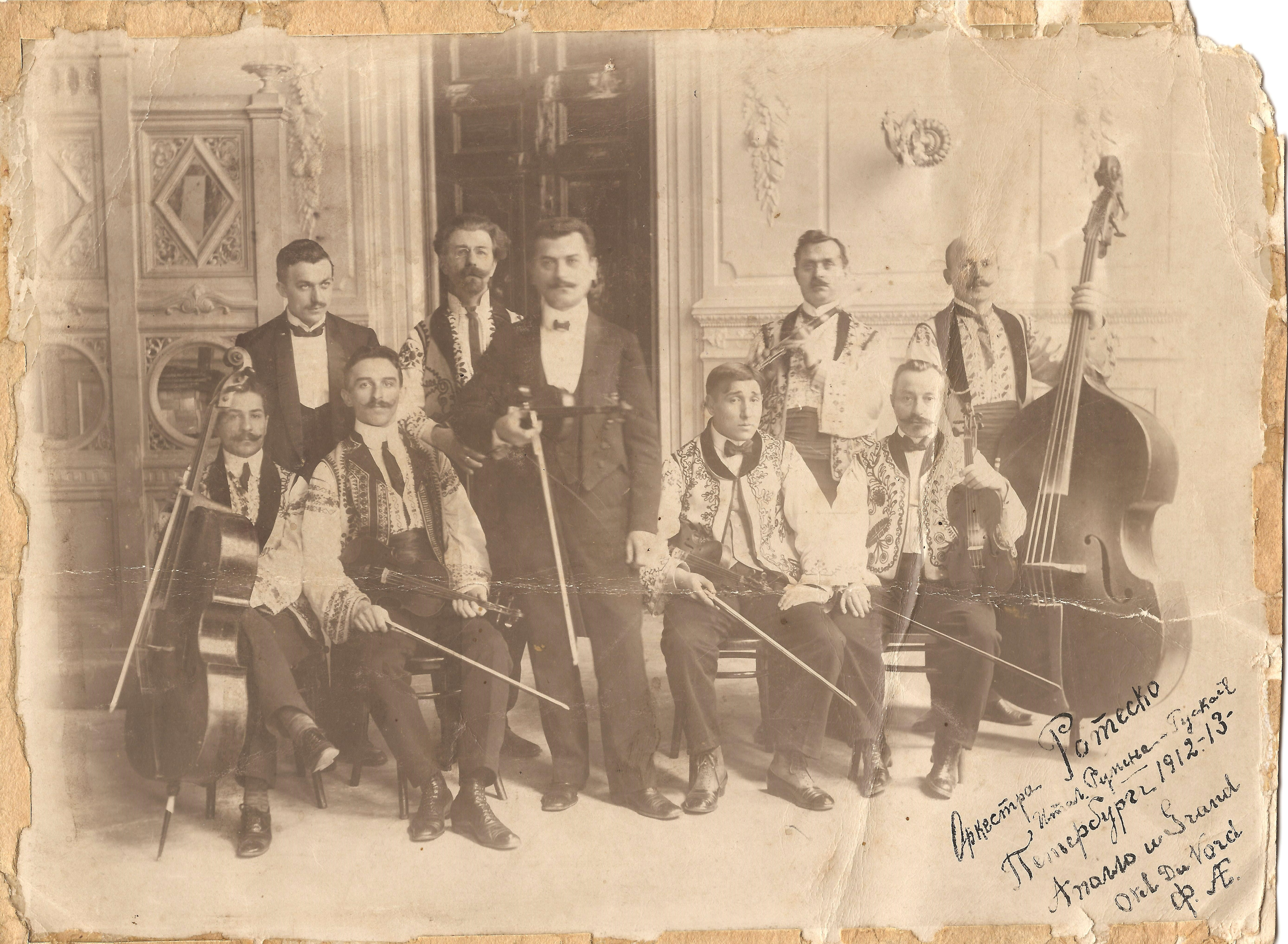
Ferraris' Salon Orchestra at the Grand Hotel du Nord, Saint Petersburg

One of his most famous song is the Russian styled "Dark Eyes", published around 1910 as Schwarze Augen with German editor Otto Kuhl. Ferraris then published it again in 1931 by Paris Editions Salabert, as "Tes yeux noirs (impression russe) " and with Jacques Liber, on Oct 9th, 1931, as "Dark Eyes". The song was a success of the 1930s, with artists such as Albert Sandler, filmed by British Pathe in 1932 and Leslie Jeffries, filmed by British Pathe in 1939 or sung by Al Bowlly, with words of Albert Mellor. Ferraris himself can be seen in a British Pathé film from 1934 of Alfredo and his Gypsy Band, sitting in the orchestra behind the lead Alfredo. They sometimes played together, as showed in this picture below at the Alexandria Palace in London.

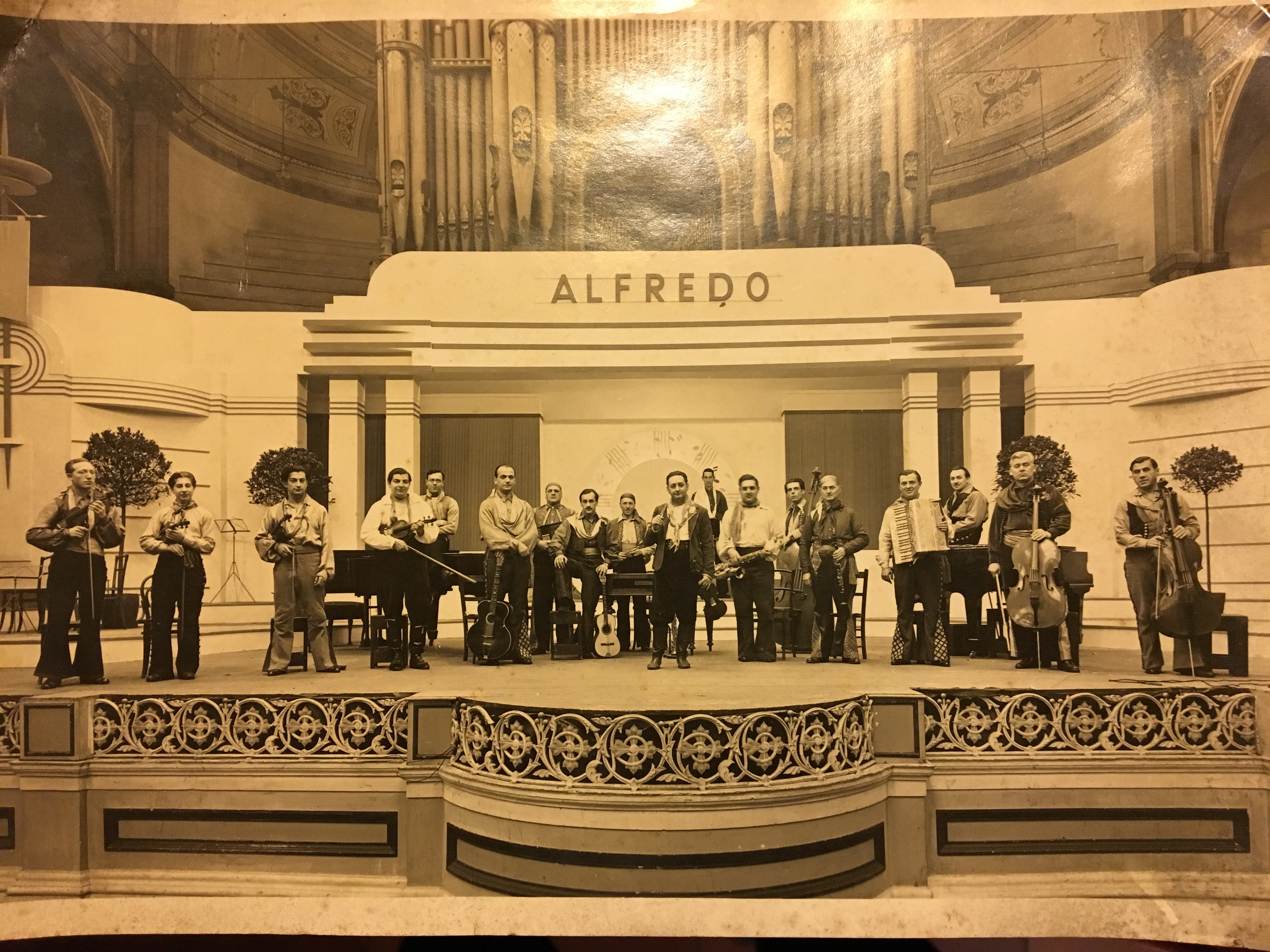
Ferraris at the Alexandria Palace in London, 1935, with Alfredo and his Orchestra

Among other versions, a 1941 recording of Dark Eyes (by Ferraris) played by Harry Parry and his radio sextet was a hit during the war, and a very original interpretation for electric guitar, played by Chet Atkins. Ferraris version is still played today by many artists such as the Trio Artemis and Hristo Kardjiev. The song was recorded in Italy by Nino Impallomeni and his orchestra, and by Don Rico and his Orchestra.

=== The Great War ===
Ferraris was caught by the war in Russia, and travelled via Finland through England to get back to Italy and join the Italian Army.

=== Success in England ===
After the First World War and his marriage in 1920 with Adele Brunelli, Ferraris went to London, where he played with his band, the Novarese Band, and composed and published many well-known songs.

The Novarese Band in 1924

In London, Ferraris played in the Piccadilly Orchestra and other London orchestras and became acquainted with many musicians of that era who played his music, including violinists Al Bowlly, Albert Sandler and Leslie Jeffries. His collaboration with Max Jaffa was also very prolific, with many of Ferraris songs recorded by Jaffa, such as, again, Dark Eyes, "Souvenir d'Ukraine", Gipsy Idylle, and other songs., as shown in the Vocalion Broadcast of November 1932.

In 1932 Ferraris wrote "The Russian Pedlar", which became one of his major successes, played by bands such as The Commodore Grand Orchestra.

The Vocalion of November 1932

The Commodore Grand Orchestra play Ferraris

In 1936, Mantovani and his band brought to success "A Balalaika", a tango.

Another 1930s famous song of Ferraris is the orchestral and piano arrangements for Two Guitars, which is still a hit for touring bands, including the 100 Tagu Ciganyzenekar and the Gypsy Philharmonic Orchestra and others like Zoltan Maga.

In the late thirties, the Italian singer Dora Menichelli with the famous duo Bormioli-Semprini record, with Parlophon, a few Ferraris songs in Italian, including "la canzone che nome non ha" or the song without a name, currently preserved at the National Museum of audio, Museo dell'Audiovisivo.

Here is a list of some of his lesser-known songs: - Flor Gitana

- For you my love I'm waiting

- Idylle Tzigane

- In a gipsy camp

- Rose of Spain

- Midnight follies

- Life is Beautiful (La vita e' bella)

- A fete in Santa Lucia, part of the suite "bella Napoli", and also played by Mantovani and his Orchestra - Galanteria

=== Late years ===
At the outbreak of World War II, he went back to Italy as an Italian citizen and stayed until the end of the war. He then came back to England, becoming naturalised British. In the difficult times of post-war London, he restarted his musical career and also formed a music publishing company.

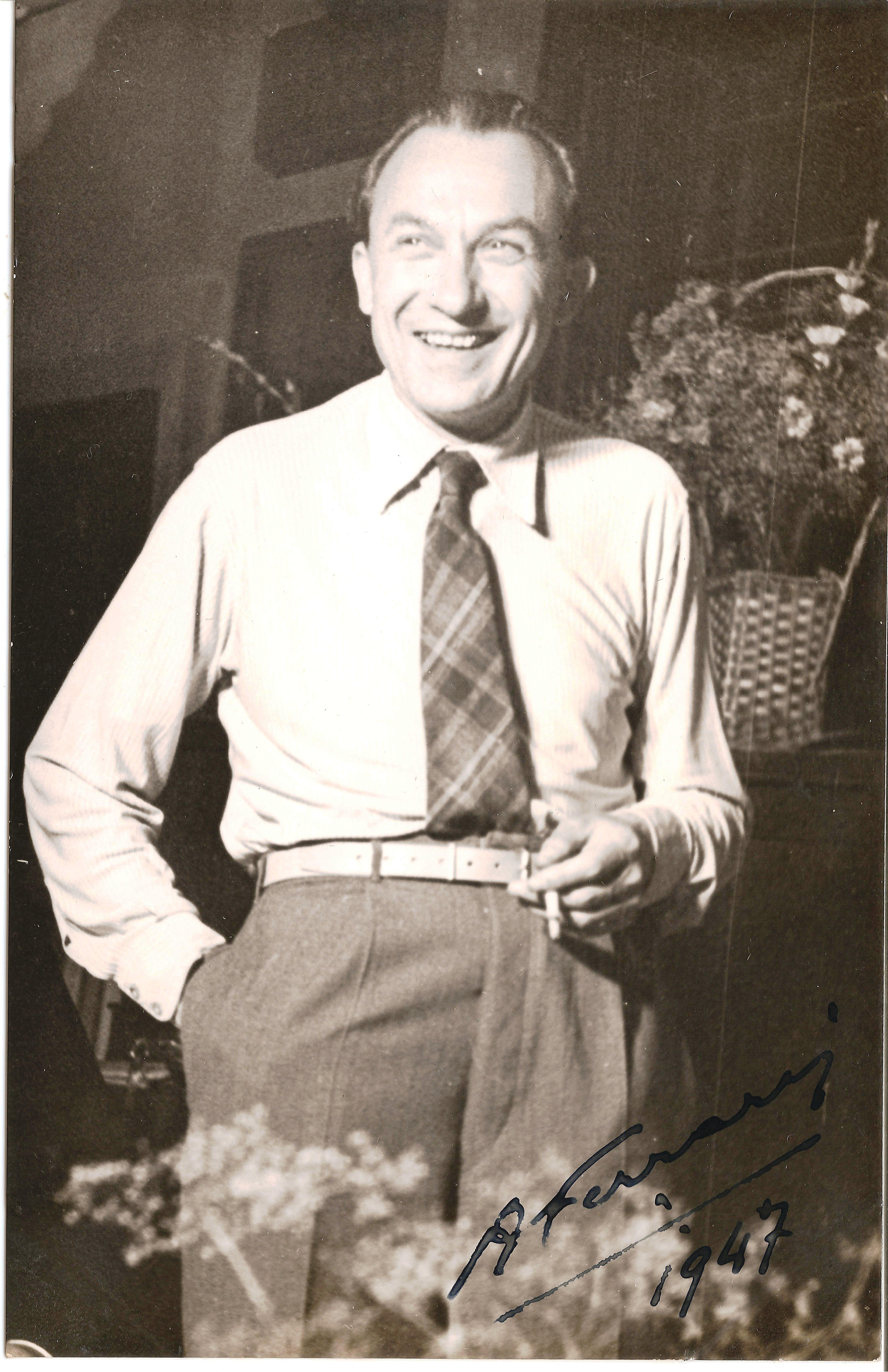
Musician and composer Adalgiso Ferraris in London, 1947

He continued to live in London, composing and playing music on his beloved antique "Pleyel", until his death on the last day of 1968, at his house in Woolwich.
