= Susanna Andersson =

Swedish opera singer (born 1977)

Susanna Andersson (born 7 December 1977) is a Swedish operatic soprano and the winner of the 2003 Guildhall School of Music and Drama's Gold Medal Competition.

== Life and career ==
Andersson was born in Östersund. She received her education at the Ljungskile College Institute before moving to London where she was admitted to the Guildhall School of Music and Drama, graduating in 2003 from the opera course with First Class Honours.

In 2004 Andersson was chosen as the soloist for the Nobel Prize Award Ceremony at the Stockholm Concert Hall, where she performed with the Royal Stockholm Philharmonic Orchestra. Among the pieces she performed was “Proserpine” by Joseph Martin Kraus. Her stage debut in 2005 was Zerlina in the Grange Park Opera's staging of Mozart's Don Giovanni.

In 2006 and 2007 Andersson was the only singer chosen for the ECHO Rising Stars series at the Barbican Theatre, and she gave recitals with pianist Eugene Asti in London, New York City, Athens, Amsterdam, Birmingham, Brussels, Stockholm, Cologne and Vienna.

== Awards and prizes ==
- 2000 – Finalist, The Young Kathleen Ferrier Award
- 2001 - Semi-finalist, The International Mozart Competition
- 2004 – Sigrid Paskells Scholarship for the Performing Arts
- 12 May 2003 - Andersson won the Guildhall School of Music and Drama's Gold Medal Competition after the final performance at the Barbican Theatre, London. After performing pieces such as Debussy’s Pantomime and Clair de lune to piano and the Guildhall Symphony Orchestra, she was announced as the winner.
- 2004 – Song Prize at The Kathleen Ferrier Awards

== Opera roles ==
- Atalanta, in Handel's Xerxes (GSMD)
- The Queen of the Night, in Mozart's The Magic Flute (Oxford Philharmonia, 2006)
- Lucia, in Britten's Rape of Lucretia (Nürnberg KammerMusikFestival, 2003)
- Flora, in Britten's The Turn of the Screw (Nurnberg KammerMusicFestival, 2004)
- Philline, in Mignon by Ambroise Thomas (GSMD, 2005)
- Therese, in Poulenc's Les mamelles de Tirésias (GSMD)
- Susanna, in Mozart's The Marriage of Figaro (Guildhall 2004)
- Adina, in Donizetti's L'elisir d'amore (Staatstheater Nürnberg, 2006)
- Giannetta, in L'elisir d'amore (2007, Opera North)
- Echo, in Gluck's Echo and Narcissus (The Lindbury Theatre at Covent Garden, 2007)
- Papagena, in The Magic Flute (English National Opera, 2007)
- Die Freundin, in Schoenerg's Von heute auf morgen (Oper Leipzig, 2008)
- Blonde, in Mozart's Die Entführung aus dem Serail (Oper Leipzig, 2008)
- Servilia, in Mozart's La clemenza di Tito (Oper Leipzig, 2008)
- Valencienne, in Lehár's The Merry Widow (Oper Leipzig, 2008)
- Papagena (2008, Oper Leipzig)
- Zerbinetta, in Ariadne auf Naxos by R. Strauss (Oper Leipzig, 2008)
- Venus/Chief of the Gepopo, in Ligeti's Le Grand Macabre (English National Opera, 2009)
- Oscar, in Verdi's Un ballo in maschera (Teatro Colón, Buenos Aires, 2013)
