= Dave Woodhead =

Dave Woodhead may refer to:

- Dave Woodhead (comedian) (born c. 1998), Australian comedian and radio personality
- Dave Woodhead (cricketer) (born 1940), English cricketer
