= Clara Rodríguez =

Venezuelan pianist and professor (born 1968)

Clara Rodríguez, ARCM, DipRCM (Perf), (born 1968) is a Venezuelan pianist and Professor at the Royal College of Music in London.

== Early life and education ==
Rodríguez studied at the Conservatorio Nacional de Música Juan José Landaeta in Caracas and a scholarship from the Venezuelan Ministry of Culture enabled her to enroll at the Royal College of Music in London when she was seventeen. Her teachers included Phyllis Sellick, Guiomar Narváez, Niel Immelman, and Paul Badura-Skoda.

== Career ==
Rodríguez is a professor of piano at the Royal College of Music. In 2002 she founded the Ensemble Alma Viva with Latin American musicians living in London.

Rodríguez's repertoire includes both the classical repertoire and contemporary Latin American and Spanish piano. The Venezuelan composer Federico Ruiz dedicated many compositions to her, and she has given world premieres of works by Lawrence Casserley and Michael Rosas Cobian.

== Discography ==
- Pictures of the plains. The piano music of Moisés Moleiro (1904–1979)
- Triptico Tropical. The piano music of Federico Ruiz (b.1948)
- Piano Works. Teresa Carreño (1853–1917)
- Piano Music. Ernesto Lecuona (1895–1963)
- Live at the Bolivar Hall
- Americas Without Frontiers
