= Malcolm Goldring =

English conductor and musical director

Malcolm David Goldring FRSA (12 July 1949 – 12 May 2021) was an English conductor and musical director whose career encompassed orchestral, choral and youth music.

== Early life and education ==
Goldring studied the oboe at the Royal College of Music. He continued his education at Durham University, where he received a PGCE in 1972.

== Career ==
In 1975, Goldring founded the Midland Festival Chorus. He served as musical director of the Royal Leamington Spa Bach Choir from 1988 to 1995. In 1990, he was awarded a Winston Churchill Fellowship, which enabled him to tour the United States and Canada to study the development of youth and children's choirs. Following his return to the United Kingdom, he was elected a Fellow of the Royal Society of Arts.

His career also encompassed teaching and lecturing; he held the posts of music inspector for the Metropolitan Borough of Solihull and was assistant principal of the Royal Welsh College of Music and Drama.

Goldring conducted a number of major British orchestras, including the BBC Philharmonic, Royal Liverpool Philharmonic, English Symphony Orchestra and Orchestra of the Swan. In 2014, he conducted the Philharmonia Orchestra at the Royal Albert Hall in a concert commemorating the centenary of the outbreak of the First World War.

Goldring died from pancreatic cancer on 12 May 2021.
