= Tim Luscombe =

British playwright, director, actor and teacher

Tim Luscombe (born 1960) is a British director, playwright, and writer.

== Training ==
After graduating with an MA (Geography) from Oxford University, Luscombe trained as a director at the Bristol Old Vic Theatre School in the mid 1980s.

== Director ==
As a director, Luscombe has worked in London’s West End, On and Off-Broadway, in Sweden, the Netherlands, Japan and all over the UK. His most notable West End productions include Tom Stoppard’s Artist Descending a Staircase (at the Duke of Yorks, 1988, and subsequently at the Helen Hayes Theatre in New York), and Private Lives with Joan Collins at the Aldwych Theatre in 1992. His London fringe credits include a 1993 production of Joe Pintauro’s Snow Orchid featuring Jude Law at the Gate Theatre.

== Playwright ==
As a playwright, Luscombe has written for the National Theatre Studio in London, the Royal Court Theatre (The One You Love) and Hampstead Theatre (The Schuman Plan).

EuroVision was produced at the Drill Hall in 1994, subsequently transferring to the Vaudeville Theatre where it was produced by Sir Andrew Lloyd Webber. Hungry Ghosts was produced at the Orange Tree Theatre in 2011. Luscombe's play Pig was produced at Buddies in Bad Times Theatre in Toronto in 2013 where it was nominated for a Dora Mavor Moore Award for Outstanding New Play of 2014.

Luscombe has adapted several Victorian novels for the stage. All of his Jane Austen adaptations (Northanger Abbey, Persuasion and Mansfield Park, and Emma) have been produced in the UK, Northanger Abbey being revived in Chicago in 2013. In 2012, he adapted Henry James' ghost story Turn of the Screw.

In 2018, Luscombe published Learning German (badly), an autofictional memoir of his experiences as a British expat living in Berlin, facing the consequences of Brexit.

In 2025, the musical Stiletto written by Luscombe in collaboration with Matthew Wilder (music and lyrics) premiered in London at the Charing Cross Theatre. Stiletto centres on a love story between two young singers struggling to find their way into the opera world of 1730s Venice.

== Awards ==
He was nominated for a Laurence Olivier award for his productions of Noël Coward’s Easy Virtue and Terrence Rattigan’s The Browning Version & Harlequinade (1988). His play A Map of the Region was shortlisted for the Bruntwood Prize in 2011.

== Bibliography ==
=== Drama (stage) ===
- The Schuman Plan. (Nick Hern Books, 2006) ISBN 9781854599193
- Amateur Rites. (Silvermoon, 2014) ISBN 9781910457061

=== Stage adaptations ===
- Northanger Abbey. (Nick Hern Books, 2005) ISBN 9781854598370
- Jane Austen's Persuasion. (Oberon, 2011) ISBN 9781849431934
- Jane Austen's Mansfield Park. (Oberon, 2012) ISBN 9781849434843
- Turn of the Screw. (Oberon, 2018) ISBN 978-1786826114

=== Books ===
- Learning German (badly). (Claret Press, 2018) ISBN 9781910461440 :
