= Juno Awards of 2004 =

Canadian music awards ceremony

- Date: April 4, 2004
- Venue: Rexall Place; Edmonton, Alberta
- Hosted by: Alanis Morissette

Television/radio coverage
- Network: CTV

The Juno Awards of 2004 were presented on April 4, 2004, at Rexall Place in Edmonton, Alberta, Canada and were hosted by Alanis Morissette.

Singer-songwriters Nelly Furtado, Sarah McLachlan, and Nickelback led the nominations with five nominations each. Céline Dion, received four nominations; Billy Talent, Our Lady Peace and Sam Roberts each received three; Avril Lavigne, Barenaked Ladies, Christina Aguilera, Lillix, Michael Bublé, R. Murray Schafer, Shania Twain, and Tafelmusik Baroque Orchestra got two nominations each.

Producer/musician Bob Ezrin is this year's inductee into the Canadian Music Hall of Fame. Walt Grealis, who founded in 1970 what became the Juno Awards, will posthumously receive the award that bears his name, the Walt Grealis Special Achievement Award.

The opening ceremony was held on April 2 and was attended by Prime Minister Paul Martin.

== People ==
Artist of the Year	Group of the Year
Sam Roberts; Shawn Desman; Céline Dion; Nelly Furtado; Sarah McLachlan	Nickelback; Barenaked Ladies; La Chicane; Finger Eleven; Our Lady Peace
New Artist of the Year	New Group of the Year
Michael Bublé; Barlow; Kazzer; Danny Michel; Kinnie Starr	Billy Talent; The Dears; Lillix; Three Days Grace; The Trews
Fan Choice Award	Songwriter of the Year
Nickelback; Céline Dion; Avril Lavigne; Sarah McLachlan; Shania Twain	Sarah McLachlan and Pierre Marchand, "World on Fire"/"Fallen"/"Stupid" — Afterglow, Sarah McLachlan; Kathleen Edwards, "Six O'clock News"/"Hockey Skates"/"Mercury" — Failer, Kathleen Edwards; Nelly Furtado, Gerald Eaton/Brian West/Trevor Horn/Anne Dudley/Malcolm McLaren/Gerald Eaton/Brian West "Saturdays"/"Powerless (Say What You Want)"/"Childhood Dreams" — Folklore, Nelly Furtado; Ron Sexsmith, "You Were There"/"On A Whim"/"Someway Somehow" — Rarities, Ron Sexsmith; Hawksley Workman, "Anger As Beauty"/"We Will Still Need a Song"/"Smoke Baby" — Lover/Fighter, Hawksley Workman
Producer of the Year	Recording Engineer of the Year
Gavin Brown — Billy Talent, "Try Honesty" and Three Days Grace, "I Hate Everything About You"; Malcolm Burn — Emmylou Harris, "Here I Am" / "I Will Dream"; Joao Carvalho — Pilate, "Into Your Hideout"; Daniel Lanois — Daniel Lanois, "Falling at Your Feet" / "Sometimes"; Pierre Marchand — Sarah McLachlan, "World on Fire"	Mike Haas, Dylan Heming and Jeff Wolpert — Holly Cole, "Heat Wave" and "Something Cool"; Claude Champagne — La Bottine Souriante, "Paye la traite" and "De tido à Ti-douard"; Warne Livesey — Matthew Good, "Weapon" and "In a World Called Catastrophe"; Dean Maher — Trapt, "Headstrong" and "Echo"; Adam Samuels — Daniel Lanois, "Sometimes" and "Transmitter"

== Albums ==
Album of the Year	Alternative Album of the Year
Sam Roberts, We Were Born in a Flame; Michael Bublé, Michael Bublé; Céline Dion, One Heart; Nelly Furtado, Folklore; Sarah McLachlan, Afterglow; Nickelback, The Long Road	Buck 65, Talkin' Honky Blues; Constantines, Shine a Light; Joel Plaskett Emergency, Truthfully Truthfully; Stars, Heart; The Weakerthans, Reconstruction Site
Blues Album of the Year	Children's Album of the Year
Morgan Davis, Painkiller; Ray Bonneville, Roll it Down; Harrison Kennedy, Sweet Taste; Harry Manx and Kevin Breit, Jubilee; The Rockit 88 Band, Too Much Fun	Connie Kaldor, A Duck in New York City; Jack Grunsky,Like a Flower to the Sun; Mary Lambert, Sing Out Summer Fun; Pelican Music Project, Dodo la planète do – Dream songs night songs 2; Loretto Reid, The Children of Lir
Classical Album of the Year – Solo or Chamber Ensemble	Classical Album of the Year – Large Ensemble or Soloist(s) with Large Ensemble Accompaniment
Gryphon Trio, Murphy, Chan, Hatzis, Kulesha: Canadian Premieres; Angela Hewitt, Francois Couperin: Keyboard Music-1; L'Ensemble des Ideés heureuses, Graupner Cantatem Sonate, Ouverture: Instrumental and Vocal Music, Vol 2; Marc-André Hamelin, Szymanowski: The Complete Mazurkas; Pinchas Zukerman, Amanda Forsyth, Jane Logan, Kimball Sykes, Jethro Marks, Donnie Deacon and Jessica Linnebach, Mozart*Zukerman	André Laplante, Christopher Millard, Robert Cram, Joaquin Valdepenas, CBC Radio Orchestra, Mario Bernardi, Concertos: Music of Jacques Hétu; Tafelmusik Baroque Orchestra, Bach Orchestral Suites; Alain Lefèvre and the Quebec Symphony Orchestra, Concertos: Matthieu, Addinsell, Gershwin; Tafelmusik Baroque Orchestra with Jeanne Lamon, Mozart Noir; Yannick Nézet-Séguin with the Orchestra Métropolitain, Nino Rota: La Strada
Classical Album of the Year – Vocal or Choral Performance	Contemporary Christian/Gospel Album of the Year
Isabel Bayrakdarian, James Parker, Cello Ensemble, Azulão; Karina Gauvin, Raffi Armenian and the Canadian Chamber Ensemble, Chants d'Auvergne; Ben Heppner, Ideale: Songs of Paolo Tosti; Suzie LeBlanc, Daniel Taylor, Arion Ensemble and Stephen Stubbs, Handel: Love Duets; Tafelmusik Chamber Choir and Ivars Taurins, Chants sacrés et profanes	Jill Paquette, Jill Paquette; Bec Abbot, Shine Like Stars; Jody Cross, Forward to Forever; downhere, So Much for Substitutes; Jim Witter, Forgiveness
Country Album of the Year	Francophone Album of the Year
Shania Twain, Up!; Terri Clark, Pain to Kill; Doc Walker, Everyone Aboard; Brad Johner, Free; Aaron Lines, Living Out Loud	Wilfred Le Bouthillier, Wilfred Le Bouthillier; Céline Dion, 1 fille & 4 types; Garou, Reviens; Jean-François Breau/Marie-Eve Janvier/Mario Pelchat/Claude Léveillée/Philippe Berghella/Cassiopée/Cindy Daniel/Chico Castillo, Don Juan – Un musical de Félix Gray; Marie-Chantal Toupin, Maudit Bordel
Instrumental Album of the Year	International Album of the Year
I Sorenti, Italian Love Songs; Richard Abel, Romance; George Carlaw, Stress Less; The Covingtons, Country Christmas; Michel Cusson, Un homme et son péché	50 Cent, Get Rich Or Die Tryin'; Christina Aguilera, Stripped; Hilary Duff, Metamorphosis; Evanescence, Fallen; Rod Stewart, It Had to Be You: The Great American Songbook
Jazz Album of the Year – Contemporary	Jazz Album of the Year – Traditional
Great Uncles of the Revolution, Blow the House Down; François Bourassa Quartet, Indefinite Time; D. D. Jackson, Suite for New York; Michael Kaeshammer, Strut; Metalwood, Chronic	Guido Basso, Lost in the Stars; Mike Murley and David Occhipinti, Duologue; One Take, One Take, Vol. 1; Sandro Dominelli Quintet, Café Varzé Jazz; John Stetch, Standards
Vocal Jazz Album of the Year	Aboriginal Music Album of the Year
Holly Cole, Shade; Jeri Brown, Firm Roots; Ranee Lee, Maple Groove; Denzal Sinclaire, Denzal Sinclaire; Carol Welsman, The Language of Love	Susan Aglukark, Big Feeling; Burnt Project 1, The Avenue; Eagle & Hawk, Mother Earth; Sandy Scofield, Ketwam; Whitefish Jrs., In Honour of Percy Dreaver
Pop Album of the Year	Rock Album of the Year
Sarah McLachlan, Afterglow; Barenaked Ladies, Everything to Everyone; Barlow, Barlow; Nelly Furtado, Folklore; Lillix, Falling Uphill	Sam Roberts, We Were Born in a Flame; Billy Talent, Billy Talent; Danko Jones, We Sweat Blood; Nickelback, The Long Road; Sum 41, Does This Look Infected?
Roots & Traditional Album of the Year - Group	Roots & Traditional Album of the Year - Solo
Le Vent du Nord, Maudite Moisson; Blackie and the Rodeo Kings, BARK; La Bottine Souriante, J'ai jamais tant ri; Creaking Tree String Quartet, The Creaking Tree String Quartet; Pierre Schryer Band, Blue Drag	David Francey, Skating Rink; Bruce Cockburn, You've Never Seen Everything; Susan Crowe, Book of Days; Natalie MacMaster, Blueprint; Oh Susanna, Oh Susanna
World Music Album of the Year
Kiran Ahluwalia, Beyond Boundaries; Jesse Cook, Nomad; Flying Bulgar Klezmer Band, Sweet Return; Intakto, Intakto; Lhasa, The Living Road

== Songs and recordings ==
Single of the Year	Classical Composition of the Year
Nelly Furtado, "Powerless (Say What You Want)"; Billy Talent, "Try Honesty"; Nickelback, "Someday"; Our Lady Peace, "Innocent"; Shaye, "Happy Baby"	R. Murray Schafer, "String Quartet No. 8 (Schafer)"; Norma Beecroft, "Amplified String Quartet with Tape"; Christos Hatzis, "Everlasting Light"; Jacques Hétu, "Piano Concerto No. 2"; R. Murray Schafer, "Credo"
Dance Recording of the Year	R&B/Soul Recording of the Year
The Sound Bluntz, "Something About You"; Audrey, "I Know"; Delerium, Chimera; MC Mario, "All That I Like"; Original 3, "Give You Love"	In Essence, The Master Plan; Big Black Lincoln, Pimpin' Life; Glenn Lewis feat. Kardinal Offishall, Back for More; Tamia, Officially Missing You; X-Quisite, X-Quisite
Rap Recording of the Year	Reggae Recording of the Year
Choclair, Flagrant; BrassMunk, Dark Sunrise; IRS, Welcome To Planet IRS; Mr. Roam, Tom Strokes Presents the ClasSix Plus Six; Sweatshop Union, Natural Progression	Leroy Brown, "Rent A Tile"; Blessed, "Smile"; Dezzie, "Tease Me"; Carl Henry, "Homie's Girl"; Nana McLean, "Nana's Medley, Part 2"

== Other ==
Album Design of the Year	Music DVD of the Year
Garnet Armstrong, Susan Michalek (director/designer); Andrew MacNaughtan (photographer) — Jann Arden, Love Is the Only Soldier; Benjamin Fong (director/designer/illustrator); Janet Kimber (photographer) — Jimmy Rankin, Handmade; Jenn McIntyre (director/designer/illustrator); Ingram Barss/Jenn McIntyre (photographer) — Buck 65, Talkin' Honky Blues; Megan Oldfield (director/designer); Jon Claytor (illustrator); Richard Beland (photographer) — Gord Downie, Battle of the Nudes; Michael Wrycraft (director/designer/illustrator); Kevin Kelly — Harry Manx and Kevin Breit, Jubilee	Andrew MacNaughtan, Daniel Catullo, Allan Weinrib, Pegi Cecconi and Ray Danniels — Rush in Rio, Rush; Hamish Hamilton with Done and Dusted — In My World, Avril Lavigne; Alanis Morissette — Feast on Scraps, Alanis Morissette; Rafaël Ouellet and Marc Lostracco — Our Lady Peace Live, Our Lady Peace; Chuck Comeau and Patrick Langlois — A Big Package For You 1999–2003, Simple Plan
Video of the Year
Floria Sigismondi — "Fighter", Christina Aguilera; Don Allan — "Heaven Only Knows", K-os; Maxime Giroux — "Into Your Hideout", Pilate; Christopher Mills — "Stars and Sons", Broken Social Scene; Floria Sigismondi — "Untitled", Sigur Rós
