= Richard Beland (photographer) =

Canadian photographer

Richard Beland is a Canadian entertainment photographer, who has been photographing live music concerts since 1986. He is a tenured professor of the Digital Photography Program at Lambton College in Sarnia, Ontario. Since 2007, he has also held the position of in-house photographer at Niagara Fallsview Casino Resort.

== Career ==
From 1994 to 2009 Beland photographed live shows for Chart magazine and its online counterpart, Chart Attack.

From 2002 to 2007 Beland was the in-house photographer at Casino Rama. Since 2007, Beland has been the in-house photographer at Niagara Fallsview Casino Resort, where over 200 of his photographs are exhibited in a permanent gallery.

He has photographed publicity and promotional photographs for Iggy Pop and Beastie Boys. One of Beland's photographs was used as the cover of the book Rhyming & Stealing: A History of the Beastie Boys by The Guardian music critic Angus Batey, published by Independent Music Press in July, 1998. His live and corporate portrait photos have appeared in several books including Pearl Jam & Eddie Vedder: None Too Fragile, by Martin Clar, Hallo Spaceboy: The Rebirth of David Bowie by Dave Thompson, The Legendary Horseshoe Tavern: A Complete History by David McPherson and the cover photo of The Portfolio Chef: Satisfy Your Investment Appetite by Nancy Woods.

Following the 2017 death of the Tragically Hip frontman Gord Downie, Maclean's magazine chose Beland's iconic photograph of Downie putting on a toque to run in their story about Downie's legacy and influence on Canadian music.

In 2020 Beland directed the music video for blues harmonica player Mike Stevens's song "Livin' In Sarnia."

In 2022 an exhibit of Beland's live photography was held at the Liss Gallery in Toronto. The exhibit featured 55 shots from over 3000 shows he photographed, and ran from May 7–31. A virtual tour of the exhibit was launched to accompany it. From June 3 – September 5, 2022, the ISOGallery in Sarnia, Ontario, held a career retrospective exhibit of Beland's photos called Our Immortal Stars.

Beland published his first volume of photographs in a book entitled "Our Immortal Stars, Vol. 1," released on October 25, 2025. An exhibit of 60 framed prints coincided with the book launch at the Liss Gallery in Toronto, running from October 25th through November 29th, 2025. As a photography professor, he recommended that new photographers "get a formal education" in photography, when he appeared on Breakfast Television to discuss the publication of his book.

== Awards and nominations ==
- 2004: Nominated for Juno Award for Album Design of the Year at Juno Awards of 2004, as photographer for Gord Downie's Battle of the Nudes.
- 2006: Nominated for Canadian Country Music Association Award for Album Design of the Year, as photographer for Jason McCoy's album Greatest Hits 1995-2005.
- 2007: Nominated for Canadian Country Music Association Award for Album Design of the Year, as photographer for Johnny Reid's album Kicking Stones.
- 2020: Honorable Mention, Portrait Category, Minimalist Photography Awards for a photograph of Segun Olotu, producer of the Now Collectives Conference in Lagos, Nigeria.
