= Mohegan Pennsylvania =

Casino and racetrack in Pennsylvania, US

- Logo prior to October 2022 name change

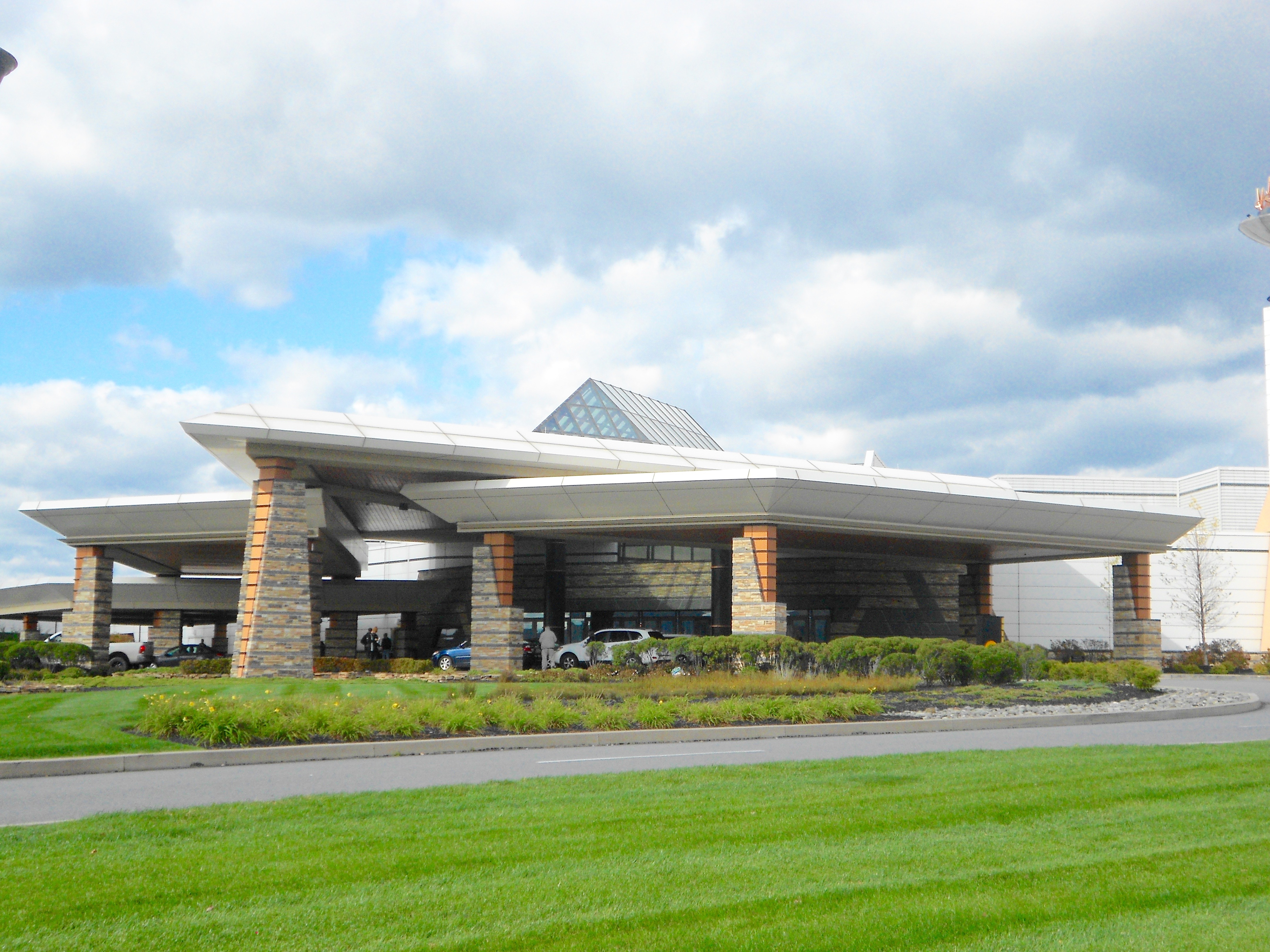
- Mohegan Pennsylvania Entrance

- Location within Pennsylvania Location within the United States
- Interactive map of Mohegan Pennsylvania
- Location: Wilkes-Barre, Pennsylvania; 1280 Hwy 315; 41.2689°N 75.8193°W
- No. of rooms: 238
- Gaming space: 82,000 square feet (7,600 m^{2})
- Signature attractions: Pocono Downs at Mohegan Pennsylvania
- Notable restaurants: Ruth's Chris Steak House
- Casino type: Land-based; Native American gaming Racino
- Owner: Downs Racing, LP; Division of Mohegan
- Previous names: Pocono Downs (1965–2005); Mohegan Sun at Pocono Downs (2005–2015); Mohegan Sun Pocono (2015–2022)
- Website: moheganpa.com

Mohegan Pennsylvania is a racino located in Plains Township on the outskirts of Wilkes-Barre, Pennsylvania. It is owned and operated by Mohegan, the gaming and entertainment arm of the Mohegan Tribe of Connecticut. The facility includes over 2,300 slot machines, live tables for blackjack, roulette and poker, and a sportsbook for sports betting. It also retains its original harness racing track, which opened in 1965 as Pocono Downs.

== History ==
The Pocono Downs harness racing facility opened in July 1965.

Mohegan acquired the racetrack on January 25, 2005, in a $280 million deal with Penn National Gaming. Rebranded as "Mohegan Sun at Pocono Downs," the facility became the first slots casino in Pennsylvania when it began operations in November 2006.

Following Pennsylvania's legalization of table games in 2010, the property added blackjack, poker, and roulette, launching those operations on July 13, 2010. In November 2013, Mohegan opened a hotel directly connected to the casino floor.

In 2015, the complex was renamed "Mohegan Sun Pocono" as part of a company-wide brand update.

On October 4, 2022, the facility was rebranded again as "Mohegan Pennsylvania" to unify the company's portfolio under a consistent naming convention.

=== Sports betting and digital gaming ===
In 2019, Mohegan partnered with the Kindred Group to launch on-site and online sports betting via its Unibet brand. A retail sportsbook opened on October 5, 2019, and online gambling followed on November 12, 2019.

=== COVID-19 impact ===
On March 18, 2020, prominent horse trainer Carmine Fusco, associated with the Pocono Downs racing scene, became the first recorded death from COVID-19 in Pennsylvania.

== Features ==
=== Dining and shopping ===
The resort includes fourteen dining options, such as Johnny Rockets, Ruth's Chris Steak House, Rustic Kitchen, and a food court. Retail options include a wine and cheese shop and several boutiques.

=== Off-track wagering ===
Mohegan also operates an off-track wagering facility in Allentown, Pennsylvania, under the same regulatory umbrella as Mohegan Pennsylvania.

== Gallery ==
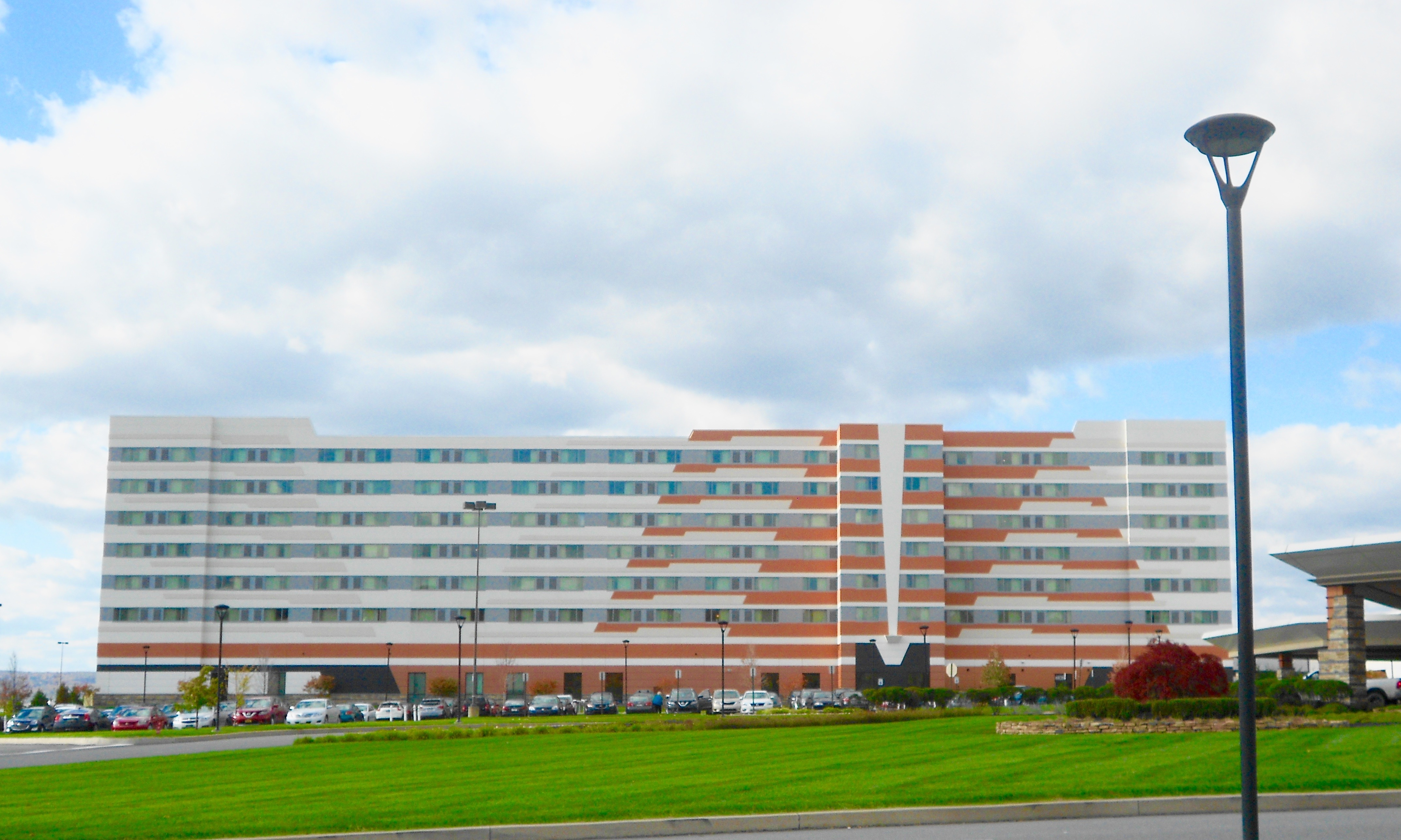
Hotel tower at Mohegan Pennsylvania

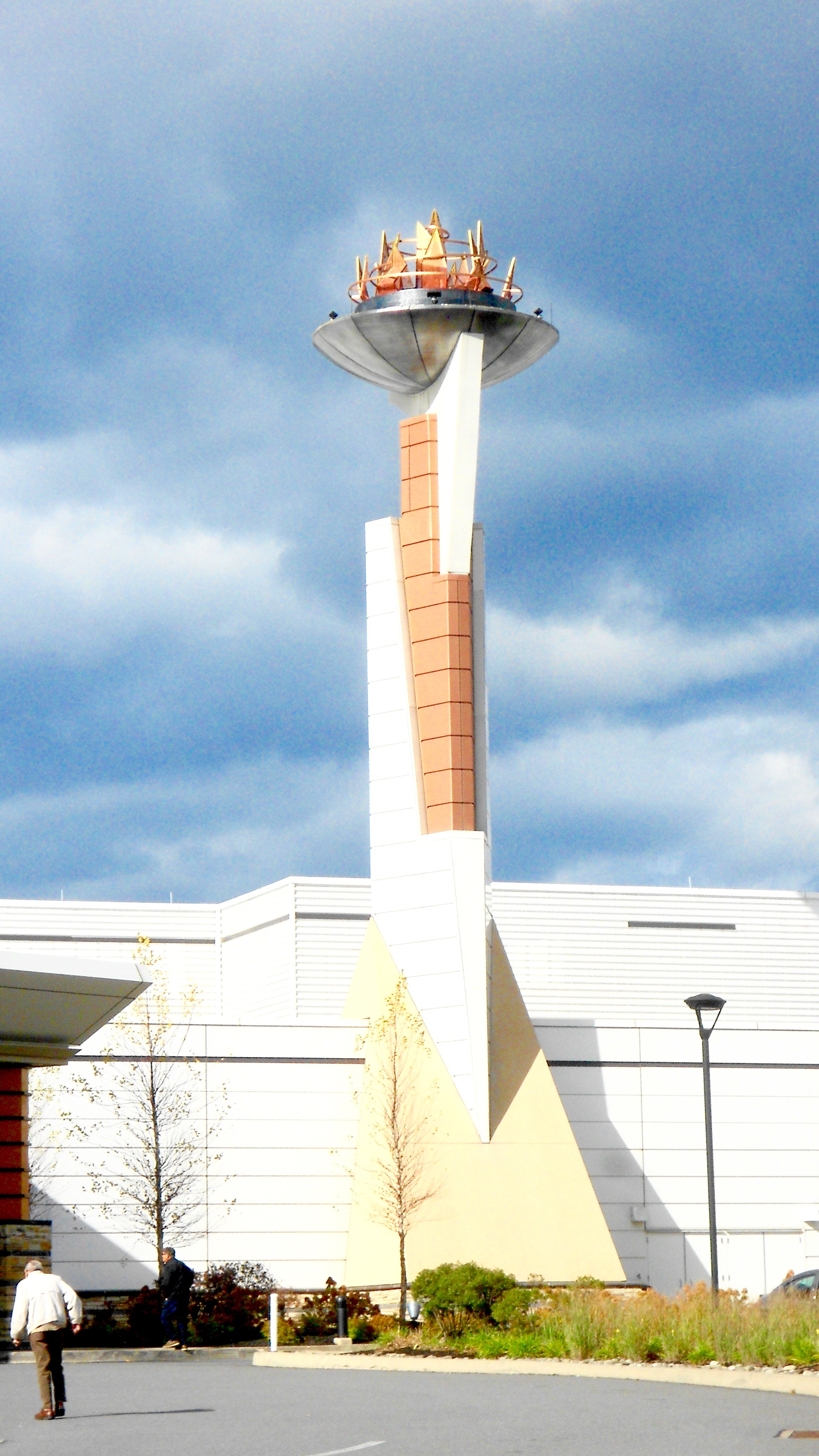
Torch near the entrance

== See also ==
- Mohegan (company)
- List of casinos in Pennsylvania
- List of casino hotels
