= Niagara Fallsview Casino Resort =

Resort casino in Niagara Falls, Ontario, Canada

Coordinates: 43.082806°N 79.080845°W

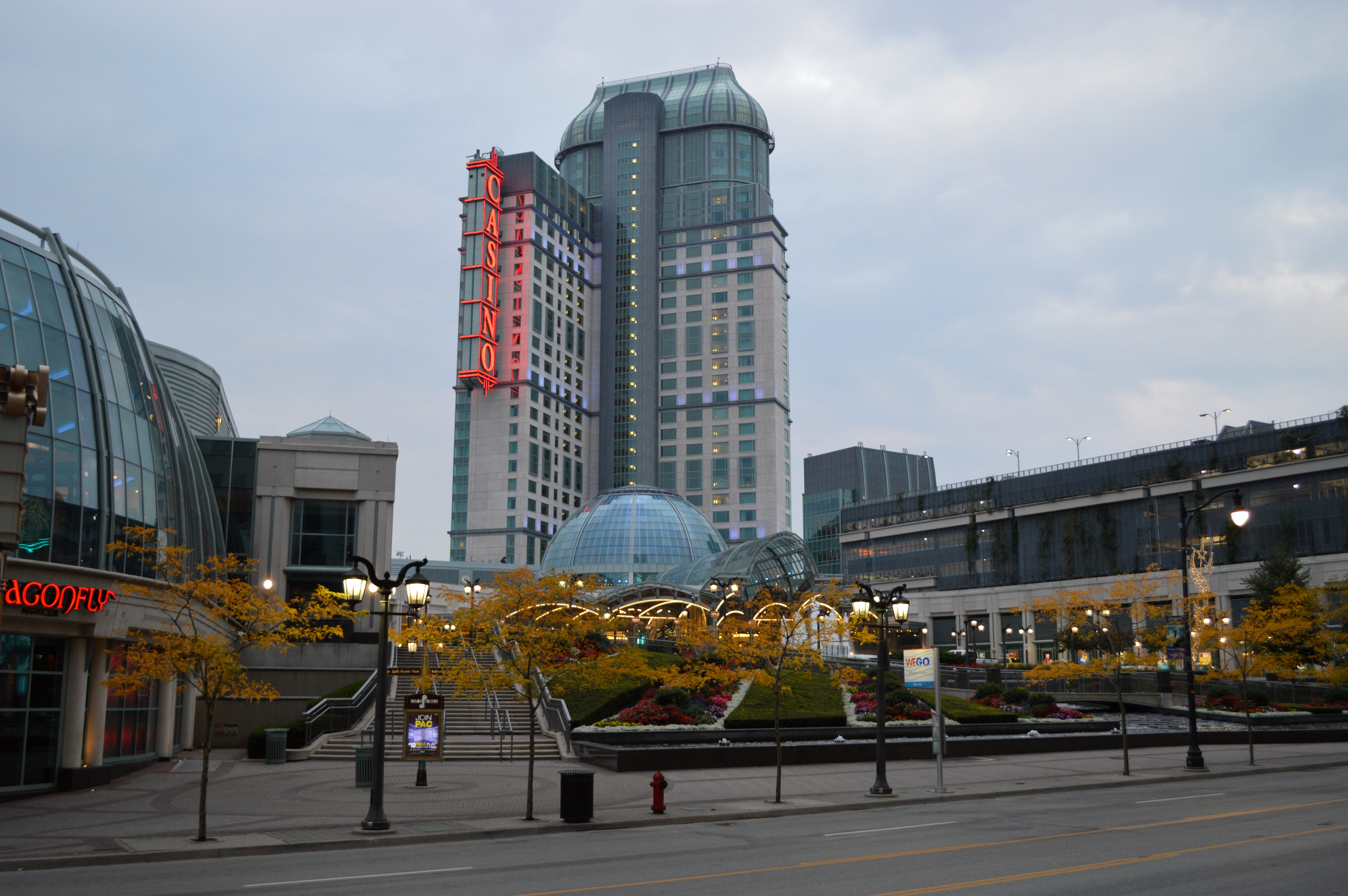
- Fallsview Casino as seen from Fallsview Boulevard
- Interactive map of Niagara Fallsview Casino Resort
- Location: 6380 Fallsview Boulevard Niagara Falls, Ontario L2G 7X5
- Opened: June 10, 2004
- Theme: Belle Époque
- No. of rooms: 372
- Gaming space: 200,000 sq ft (19,000 m^{2})
- Signature attractions: OLG Stage; Avalon Theatre
- Notable restaurants: 21 Club; Ponte Vechio; R5; Golden Lotus; Bar Barista
- Casino type: Land-based
- Owner: Ontario Lottery and Gaming Corporation
- Operating license holder: Mohegan
- Website: www.fallsviewcasinoresort.com

The Niagara Fallsview Casino Resort, commonly known as Fallsview Casino, is a resort casino in Niagara Falls, Ontario, Canada. It opened publicly on June 10, 2004. The $1 billion complex overlooks the Horseshoe Falls and is one of the most prominent features of the Niagara skyline. The property is owned by the Ontario Lottery and Gaming Corporation and operated by Mohegan.

== History ==
Planning for the resort began in 1998, when Falls Management Group L.C. was selected to develop a new casino destination for Ontario. The site chosen had previously hosted infrastructure for the Ontario Power Company, as well as a segment of the Canadian Pacific Railway's Montrose Subdivision. Construction began in 2001, and the resort officially opened three years later on June 10, 2004.

On June 11, 2019, OLG announced a 21-year agreement with Mohegan Gaming and Entertainment–an affiliate of the Mohegan Tribe, and owner of the Mohegan Sun resort in Uncasville, Connecticut—to operate Fallsview and Casino Niagara. It marked the tribe's first Canadian properties.

In August 2022, the resort opened a new 5,000-seat concert hall known as the OLG Stage. The $130 million hall was originally scheduled to open in 2020, but its opening was postponed due to the COVID-19 pandemic, and all other shows scheduled for it were either cancelled or moved to the existing Avalon Theatre until the venue could be finalized. In September 2022, Mohegan launched an online casino co-branded with the casino—PlayFallsview—as part of Ontario's regulated online gambling market.

From its second season in 2022 through 2025, Citytv filmed its reality competition series Canada's Got Talent at the Fallsview; the second season was filmed at the Avalon Theatre, and the third season moved to the OLG Stage.

In October 2023, the Grand Buffet closed, and a new sports bar area known as the Overtime Sports Lounge opened.

In 2026, the casino opened a new VIP gaming lounge known as Fallsview Privé. In August 2026, the Ontario government announced an agreement with Mohegan to waive its exclusivity as operator of casinos in the Niagara area in exchange for "financial considerations", opening the market to other operators as part of its "Destination Niagara" redevelopment strategy.

== Grounds ==
The casino resort complex takes up 230,000 square metres (2,500,000 sq ft). The resort includes a 19,000 square metres (200,000 sq ft) casino that holds over 130 gaming tables, including poker tables; and over 3,500 slot machines. Additionally, the resort includes 18 restaurants, a shopping centre with 38 shops (including Roots Canada and Swarovski boutiques among others), one nightclub, a 1,400 square metres (15,000 sq ft) fitness spa, and a hotel with 372 rooms and suites. The east façade of the complex retains the walls of the terrace and front entrance of the transformer station built in 1904. The area where the transformers resided is now the Grand Hall convention halls.

The resort includes two performance venues, the 1,500-seat Avalon Theatre, and the 5,000-seat OLG Stage.

== See also ==
- List of casinos in Canada
- Seneca Niagara Casino & Hotel
- List of integrated resorts
- List of tallest buildings in Niagara Falls, Ontario
