= Zukerman Chamber Players =

The Zukerman Chamber Players is a world-renowned chamber ensemble led by violinist and violist Pinchas Zukerman. Formed in 2003, they have performed over 40 concerts around the world and recorded four CDs.

The ensemble comprises Pinchas Zukerman (violin and viola), Jessica Linnebach (violin), Jethro Marks (viola), Ashan Pillai (viola), and Amanda Forsyth (cello). They are often joined by guest artists including Lynn Harrell, Benjamin Hochman, Yuja Wang, and Yefim Bronfman. They have performed at festivals including Ravinia, Tanglewood, Aspen, Verbier, Schleswig-Holstein, Tivoli, and the BBC Proms.

They have released a recording of the Mozart String Quintet in C Major, K.515, and the Brahms String Quintet in G Major, Opus 111 (Altara). An album (Altara) featuring Mozart and Dvořák Quintets was released in 2007.
