= Barlow (musician) =

Canadian singer-songwriter and musician

- Born: Tom Barlow; 1965 or 1966 (age 60–61)
- Origin: North York, Ontario, Canada
- Genres: Rock, pop rock
- Occupations: Singer-songwriter, musician
- Years active: 2003–present
- Label: Epic

Barlow is a Canadian singer-songwriter and musician. He is best known for his 2003 hit, "Walk Away," from his self-titled 2004 album. He has been nominated for four Juno Awards and won the Canadian Rising Star Award. Radio Music Award nomination.

== Biography ==
=== Early life ===
He was born as Tom Barlow in North York, Ontario, Canada. In 1985, Barlow began playing music in clubs and writing songs to pay for his university education. He graduated from York University in 1991 with a Bachelor of Arts and a Bachelor of Education.

=== 2003–2005: Barlow ===
In August 2003, his self-titled debut album was released on Sony The album included the singles, "Walk Away", "Married by Elvis", and "Perfect Wave". The album was nominated for Pop Album of the Year at the 2004 Juno Awards. He was also nominated as Best New Artist. The music video for the song "Perfect Wave" was nominated for Video of the Year at the 2005 Juno Awards.

== Discography ==
=== Albums ===
Year	Album Details	Chart Positions
Year	Album Details	CAN
2003	Barlow: Release date: 26 August 2003; Label: Sony Music Canada	—
2011	Burning Days: Release date: 1 November 2011; Label: Coalition Entertainment	—

=== Singles ===
Year	Title	Chart Positions	Album
Year	Title	CAN	Album
2003	"Walk Away"	—	Barlow
2004	"Married by Elvis"	—	Barlow
2005	"Perfect Wave"	—	Barlow

== Awards and nominations ==
Year	Association	Category	Result
2004	33rd Annual Juno Awards	Pop Album of the Year – Barlow	Nominated
2004	33rd Annual Juno Awards	New Artist of the Year	Nominated
2005	34th Annual Juno Awards	Video of the Year – "Perfect Wave"	Nominated
