= Amanda Forsyth =

Canadian musician

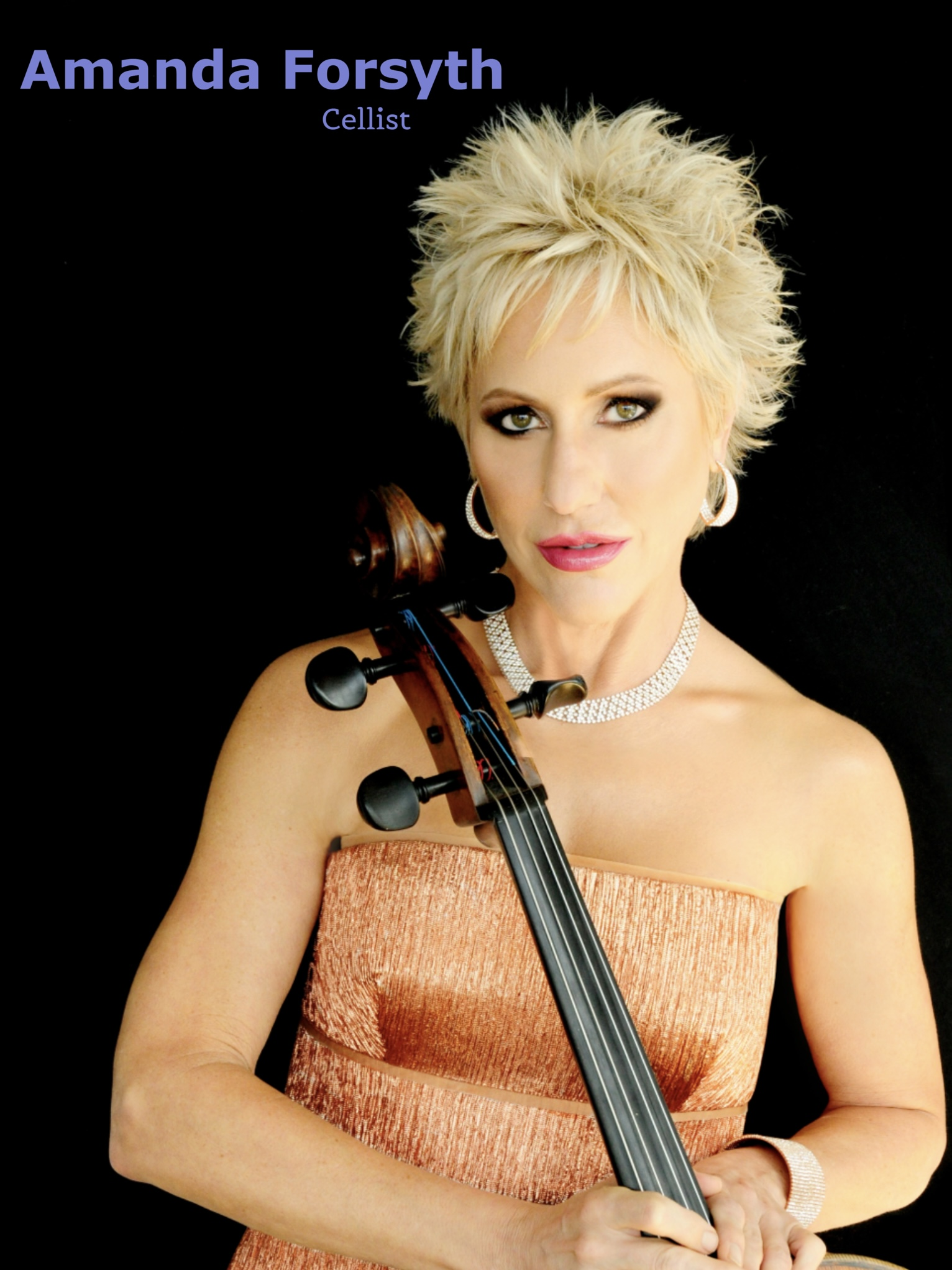

Amanda Forsyth (born 12 October 1966) is a Canadian cellist and the former principal cellist of the National Arts Centre Orchestra.

The daughter of composer Malcolm Forsyth, Forsyth came to Canada from South Africa at age 2 and began playing the cello at age 3. She became a protégé of William Pleeth in London and later studied with Harvey Shapiro at the Juilliard school in New York City and with Lynn Harrell in Los Angeles. After two seasons with the Toronto Symphony Orchestra, she became the youngest principal ever selected by the Calgary Philharmonic Orchestra, where she remained for six years. In 1999, Forsyth was appointed principal cello of the National Arts Centre Orchestra, a position she left in 2015 to pursue her solo and chamber music career.

Forsyth is a recitalist, soloist, and chamber musician who appears with orchestras and chamber music festivals worldwide.

Forsyth and her husband, violinist Pinchas Zukerman, often appear together as soloists. She has also collaborated with artists such as Lynn Harrell, Yo-Yo Ma, Garrick Ohlsson, Jon Kimura Parker, Yefim Bronfman, Joseph Kalichstein, Jaime Laredo, Arnold Steinhardt, Michael Tree, and Louis Lortie.

Forsyth is the cellist of the Zukerman Chamber Players, which has toured worldwide since 2003. In 2007 she also collaborated with Wynton Marsalis in New York, recording the soundtrack for Ken Burns's seven-part television film about World War II for PBS.

Forsyth performs on a 1699 cello by Carlo Giuseppe Testore.

== Selected recordings ==
- Soaring with Agamemnon
- Electra Rising: The Music of Malcolm Forsyth
- Zukerman Conducts Mozart
- American Journey
- Palm Court Encores (with Ensemble Vivant)
- Mozart: Flute Quartets
