= Mohegan Sun =

Hotel and casino in Connecticut, United States

Coordinates: 41°29′32″N 72°5′29″W

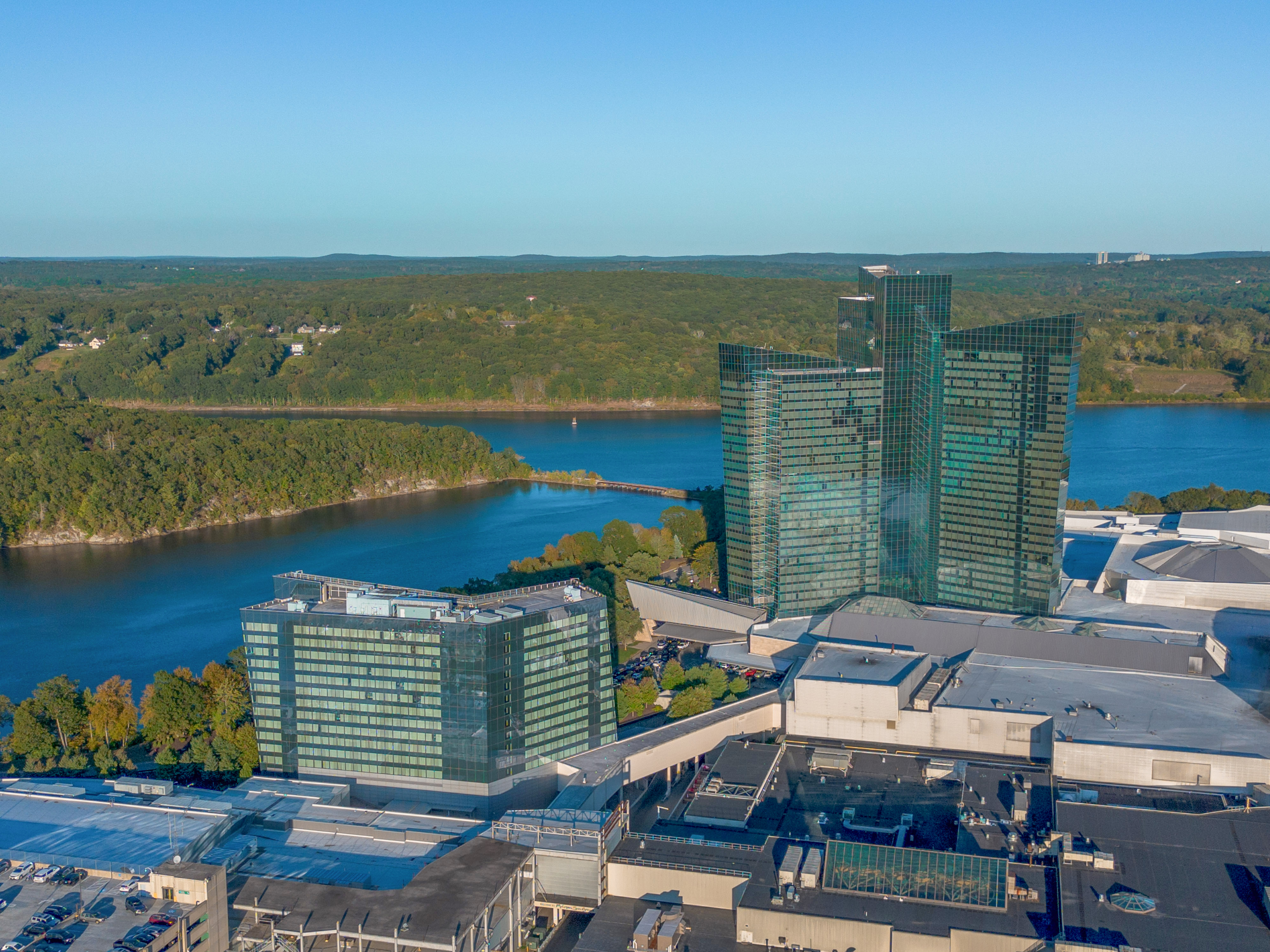
- Interactive map of Mohegan Sun
- Location: 1 Mohegan Sun Boulevard Uncasville, Connecticut, United States 06382-1355
- Opened: October 12, 1996; 30 years ago
- Theme: Native American
- No. of rooms: 1,563
- Gaming space: 364,000 sq ft (33,800 m^{2})
- Owner: Mohegan
- Renovated in: 2002; 2016
- Website: mohegansun.com

Mohegan Sun is a large casino and entertainment complex located on 240 acres (97 ha) of the Mohegan Indian Reservation in Uncasville, Connecticut, United States, along the banks of the Thames River. It is owned and operated by the federally recognized Mohegan Tribe. The resort first opened on October 12, 1996 and has since become one of the largest casinos in the United States by gaming space.

The property includes more than 364,000 square feet (33,800 m²) of gaming space featuring over 6,500 slot machines, 370 table games, and a race book. Mohegan Sun is also home to the Mohegan Sun Arena, a 10,000-seat multi-purpose venue that serves as the home court for the Connecticut Sun of the Women's National Basketball Association (WNBA).

Mohegan Sun includes two hotel towers: the original Sky Tower, and the Earth Tower, opened in 2016, which together provide more than 1,500 rooms. The resort also features a large retail and dining promenade, a spa, a 100,000-square-foot convention center, and unique architectural elements inspired by Native American culture, including the illuminated alabaster Wombi Rock and the indoor Taughannick Falls.

In addition to its entertainment and gaming operations, Mohegan Sun is one of the largest private employers in the state of Connecticut and contributes a share of its slot revenues to the state government.

== History ==
=== Early development ===
The idea for building a casino on Mohegan tribal land originated in 1992, when a group of Connecticut-based developers proposed a partnership with the Mohegan Tribe to create a gaming and entertainment facility. The group included RJH Development, LMW Investments, and Slavik Suites Inc., who together formed Trading Cove Associates (TCA).

At the time, the Mohegan Tribe was not yet federally recognized, a legal status required to operate a casino under the provisions of the Indian Gaming Regulatory Act (IGRA). Trading Cove Associates provided legal, financial, and strategic assistance to the tribe to support their efforts to achieve federal recognition, which was granted in March 1994.

The site selected for the resort was a 240-acre property on the Thames River in Uncasville, Connecticut, previously used by United Nuclear Corporation for the construction of nuclear reactor components. The site was decommissioned and cleaned up for reuse.

Following recognition, the Mohegan Tribe began negotiations to develop the casino with Trading Cove Associates. Sol Kerzner, a South African hotel and casino magnate and head of Kerzner International (formerly Sun International), joined the project by acquiring a 50% interest in TCA. The remaining 50% was held by Waterford Gaming. In 1995, the tribe established the Mohegan Tribal Gaming Authority (MTGA), a government instrumentality charged with oversight and development of the resort.

=== Opening and early years (1996–2000) ===
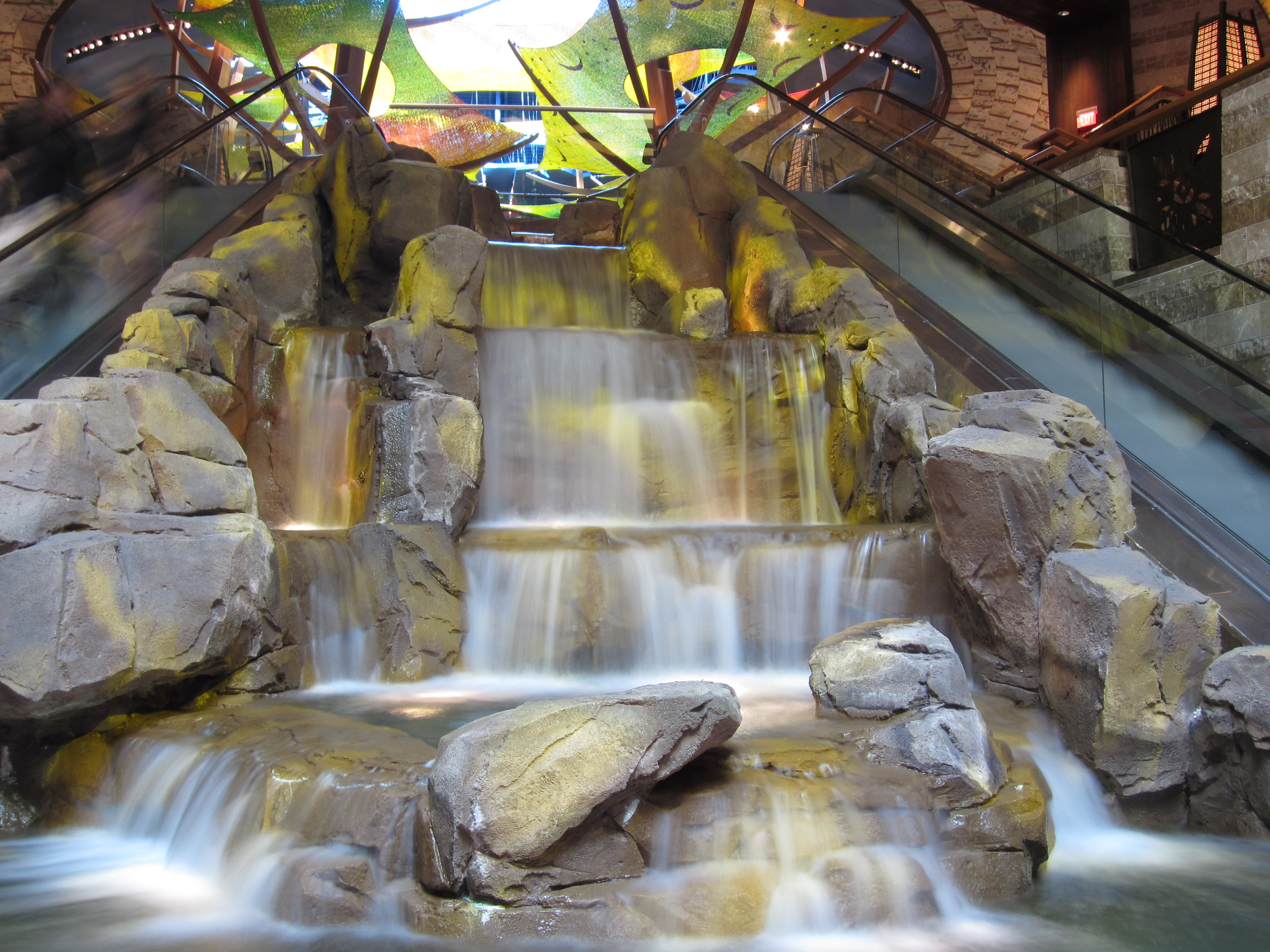
The Trail of Life walkway at Mohegan Sun, with cascading water and escalators leading to the Sky Tower

Construction of the casino and resort began following the Mohegan Tribe’s federal recognition and the formation of the Mohegan Tribal Gaming Authority (MTGA). Development was overseen by Trading Cove Associates (TCA), which managed the project on behalf of the tribe. The resort officially opened to the public on October 12, 1996.

The initial property included approximately 170,000 square feet of gaming space, featuring slot machines, table games, and a race book. It also offered multiple dining venues, a hotel, retail shops, and entertainment areas, including the 10,000-seat Mohegan Sun Arena, which would later become the home venue for the Connecticut Sun of the Women's National Basketball Association (WNBA).

The partnership between the Mohegan Tribe and Trading Cove Associates continued after the resort's opening. However, in 2000, control of the property was fully transferred to the tribe. As part of the transition agreement, Trading Cove Associates continued to receive 5% of the gross revenue generated by Mohegan Sun through 2014.

During its first few years of operation, Mohegan Sun established itself as a major tourist destination in the Northeast. Its location, near other regional attractions and along the Interstate 95 corridor, helped attract millions of visitors annually. The success of the property played a central role in strengthening the economic position of the Mohegan Tribe and laid the foundation for future expansions.

=== Expansion and renovation ===
Following the success of its initial years, Mohegan Sun undertook a series of expansions and renovations to enhance its offerings and accommodate growing visitor demand: in the early 2000s, the property was renovated to include additional gaming space, expanded retail and dining options, and upgraded hotel accommodations.

In November 2006, the Mohegan Tribe announced a major $740 million expansion plan called "Project Horizon." The project was to be completed in phases and originally scheduled for full completion in 2010. It included the construction of a second hotel tower, a new 42-table poker room, and a third casino called Casino of the Wind. The new casino, which opened in August 2008, featured 650 slot machines and 28 table games.

However, due to the effects of the Great Recession and declining regional gaming revenue, Project Horizon was suspended in September 2008 before its full scope could be realized. The Mohegan Tribal Gaming Authority later recorded a $58.1 million impairment charge related to the halted expansion, and Project Horizon was formally terminated in the years that followed.

Despite the setback, Mohegan Sun continued to expand. In 2013, plans were announced for a 200,000-square-foot “Downtown District” adjacent to the resort, intended to feature a New England-themed food hall, a 14-screen movie theater, boutique retail shops, and a bowling-and-dining venue. Although widely reported, construction on this project was never completed.

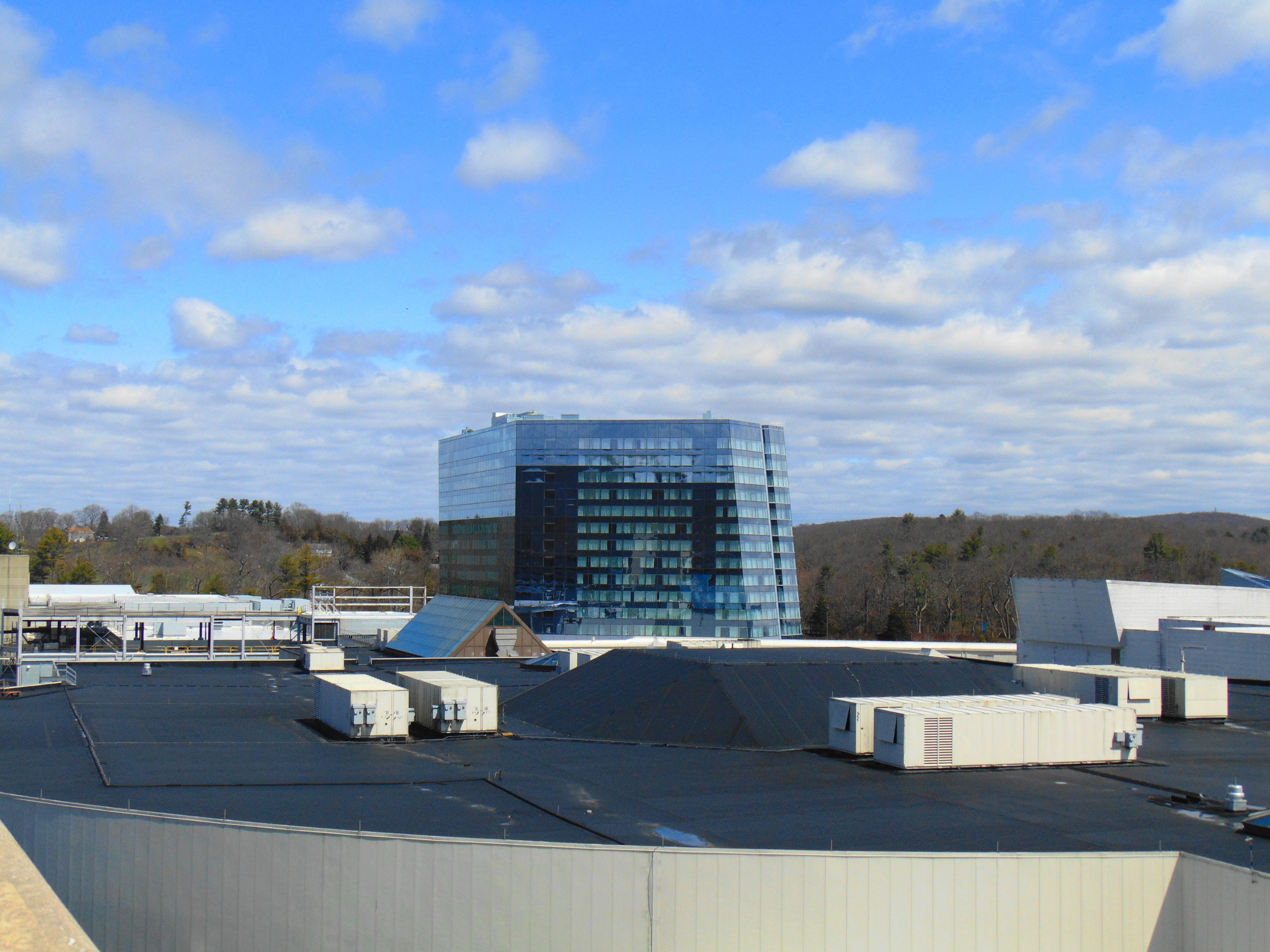
The Earth Tower, completed in 2016 as part of the major expansion

One of the most significant additions came with the construction of the Earth Tower, a 400-room hotel tower opened on November 18, 2016. The Earth Tower was developed to meet rising hotel demand and was financed and built by a third-party developer, then leased back to Mohegan Sun to operate. It is directly connected to the existing Casino of the Earth and adds 242,000 square feet of hotel space to the resort.

In May 2018, Mohegan Sun opened the Earth Expo & Convention Center. The facility added 125,000 square feet of column-free exhibition space, a 20,000-square-foot ballroom, and 15 additional meeting rooms. Together with its existing conference and function space, the venue significantly increased Mohegan Sun’s ability to host large-scale conventions and trade shows.

=== COVID-19 pandemic ===
On March 17, 2020, Mohegan Sun closed its doors for the first time since opening in 1996, in response to the COVID-19 pandemic in Connecticut. The decision was made jointly with Foxwoods Resort Casino, marking a rare, coordinated closure of the two tribal gaming properties in Connecticut.

The temporary closure had significant economic implications for the region. Thousands of Mohegan Sun employees were furloughed or laid off, contributing to a sharp rise in unemployment in southeastern Connecticut.

Although the casino is located on sovereign tribal land and not subject to state mandates, Governor Ned Lamont urged tribal leaders to delay reopening due to ongoing public health concerns. Despite the warnings, Mohegan Sun proceeded with a limited reopening on June 1, 2020, implementing a variety of safety measures including reduced capacity, health screenings, and the suspension of certain high-risk operations such as buffets and large gatherings.

In response, the state of Connecticut placed electronic warning signs on highways leading to the casinos to discourage travel to the facilities.

Over time, Mohegan Sun gradually resumed operations in accordance with health guidance and guest demand. The pandemic also prompted a shift toward digital engagement and sports betting, both of which would play larger roles in the casino's future operations.

== Facilities ==
=== Casino ===
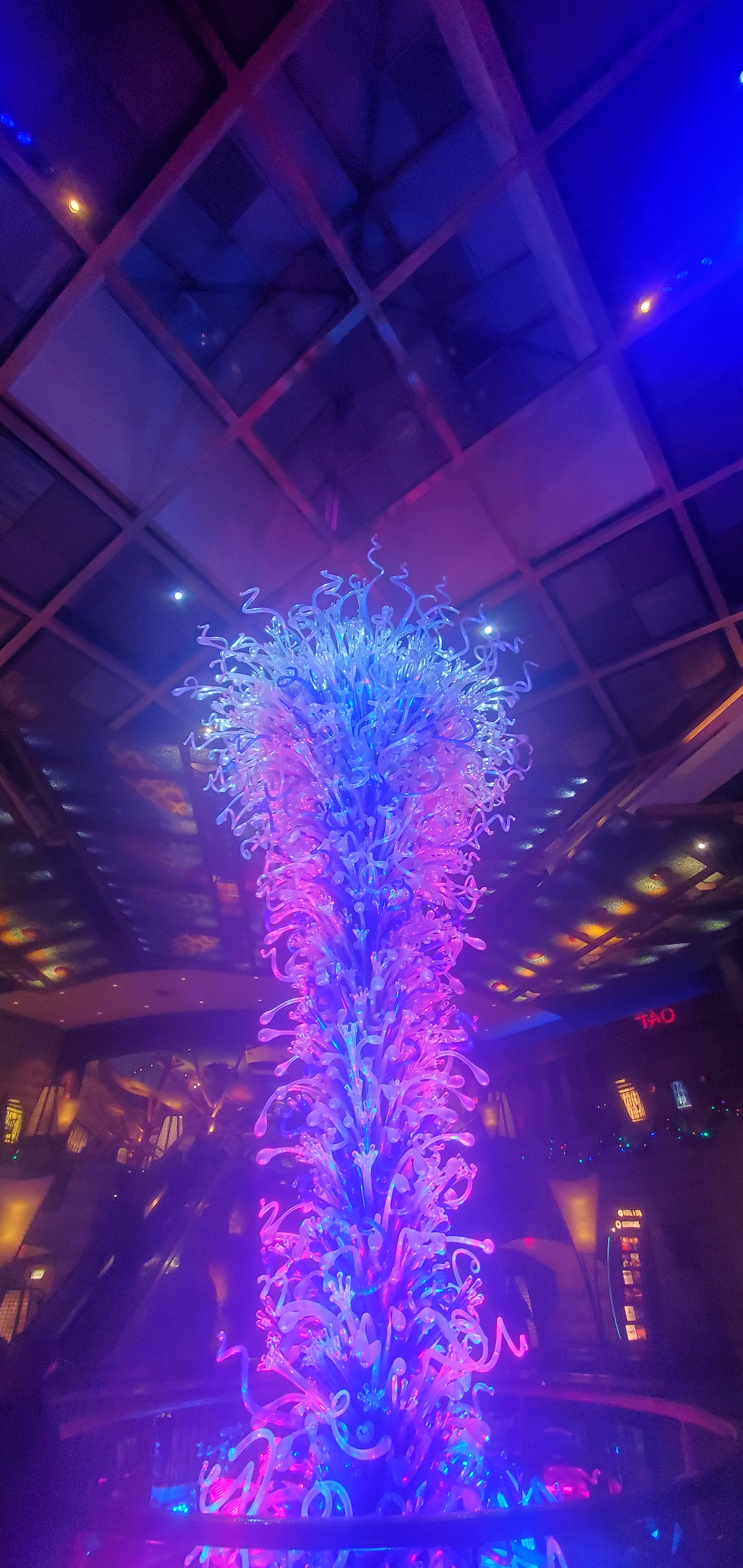
"River Blue," a towering glass sculpture by artist Dale Chihuly, on display in the Casino of the Sky situated near the escalators leading to the Shops at Mohegan Sun. It features hundreds of individually blown glass elements.

Mohegan Sun contains one of the largest gaming floors in the United States, with approximately 364,000 square feet (33,800 m²) of gaming space. The casino is divided into several themed areas, including the Casino of the Earth, Casino of the Sky, and Casino of the Wind. Each section features distinct architectural and design elements inspired by Native American culture and natural environments.

The gaming floor includes over 6,500 slot machines and more than 370 table games offering a variety of play styles. Table games include blackjack, craps, roulette, baccarat, pai gow poker, Caribbean stud poker, three-card poker, and other traditional and specialty games.

The Casino of the Wind, opened in August 2008, includes a dedicated 42-table poker room, a 35-foot indoor waterfall, and approximately 650 slot machines.

Mohegan Sun also offers a racebook, which features simulcast wagering on horse and greyhound races from around the United States as well as international tracks in Australia and England. While Connecticut does not currently allow traditional sports betting at tribal casinos, the Mohegan Tribe has participated in negotiations with the state regarding the future of regulated online gaming and sports wagering.

In addition to traditional gaming, the casino offers electronic table games, including video versions of blackjack, craps, and roulette, catering to guests who prefer a hybrid digital experience.

=== Hotels ===
Mohegan Sun features two hotel towers: the Sky Tower and the Earth Tower. Together, they provide more than 1,500 guest rooms and suites, making the resort one of the largest hotel properties in the state of Connecticut.

The original Sky Tower opened with the resort in 1996. It stands 34 stories tall and includes over 1,200 rooms, including luxury suites and a 3,000-square-foot presidential suite. The tower offers amenities such as a spa, fitness center, indoor pool, and high-end concierge services.

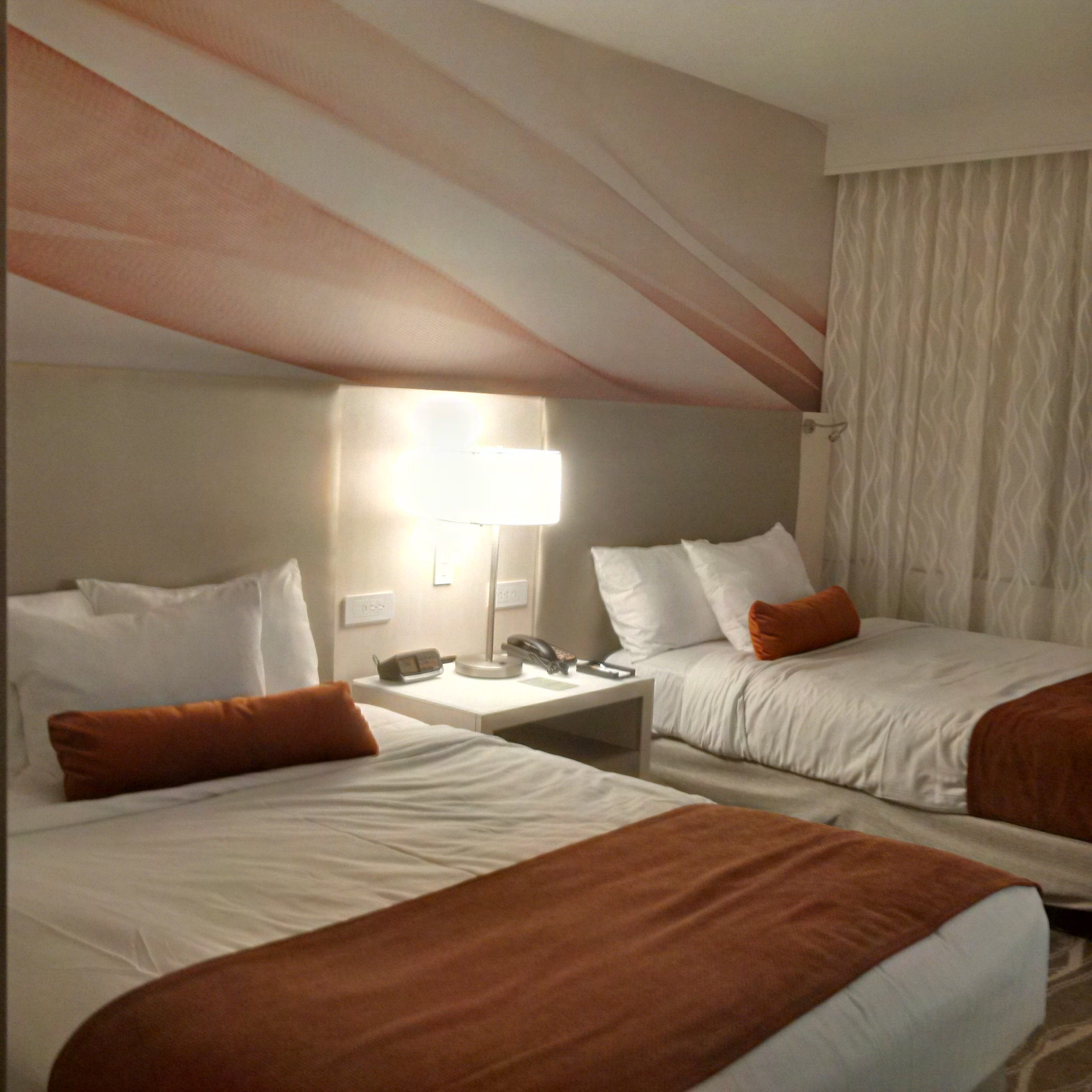
A guest room in the Earth Tower, opened in 2016

The Earth Tower was opened on November 18, 2016, as part of a $139 million expansion to meet growing visitor demand. It includes 400 rooms across 242,000 square feet of hotel space. The tower was developed by a third-party firm and is leased by Mohegan Sun for day-to-day operations. The Earth Tower is connected to the Casino of the Earth and features a lobby lounge, coffee and snack bar, fitness area, and access to resort amenities.

Both towers are accessible via indoor walkways to the casino, convention center, retail promenade, and entertainment venues. The hotel's architectural design incorporates elements inspired by natural landscapes and Native American motifs, consistent with the thematic style used throughout the resort.

=== Convention and meeting spaces ===
Mohegan Sun includes one of the largest hotel-based convention and meeting facilities in the Northeastern United States. The resort offers more than 275,000 square feet (25,500 m²) of meeting, exhibition, and function space, designed to accommodate events ranging from small meetings to large-scale conventions and trade shows.

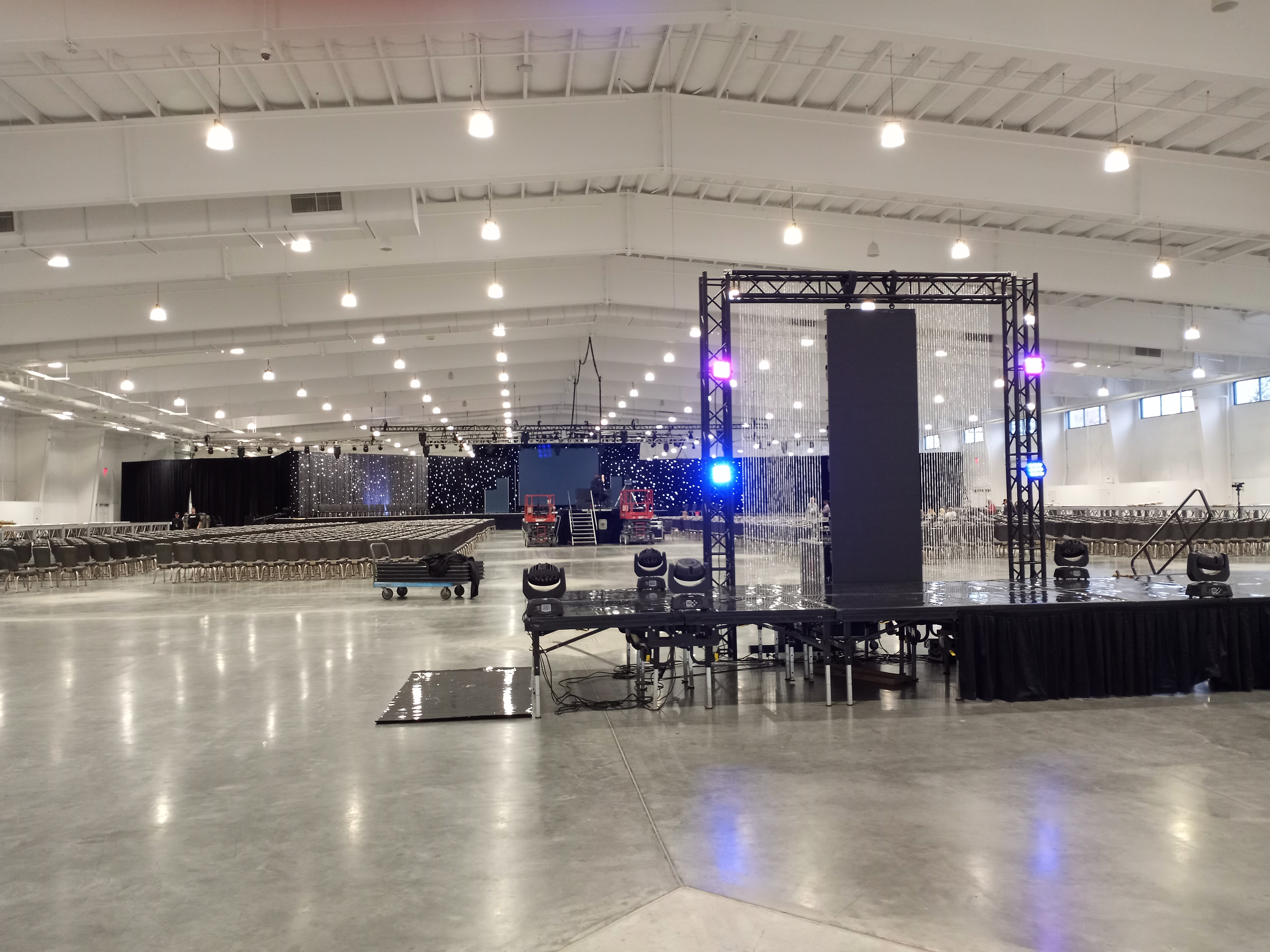
The Earth Expo & Convention Center at Mohegan Sun, shown during the Miss America 2023 pageant

The centerpiece of the complex is the Earth Expo & Convention Center, which officially opened in May 2018. It includes:

- A 125,000-square-foot column-free expo hall
- A 20,000-square-foot ballroom
- 15 additional meeting rooms, including an executive boardroom
- Significant pre-function space for receptions and networking

The facility was built to provide enhanced flexibility and access for corporate events, trade shows, and association conferences. It connects directly to the Earth Tower hotel and other areas of the resort, allowing for integrated guest accommodations and entertainment options.

Mohegan Sun also houses the Uncas Ballroom, which spans 38,000 square feet and is recognized as one of the largest hotel ballrooms in the region. The ballroom is located within the Sky Convention Center and can be subdivided for smaller gatherings or configured for banquets, award ceremonies, and galas.

Support amenities for meetings and conventions include on-site audiovisual services, business centers, catering options, and high-speed wireless internet throughout all event areas.

=== Retail and dining ===
Mohegan Sun features an extensive retail and dining promenade that spans over 130,000 square feet (12,000 m²), offering a mix of national brands, luxury boutiques, and Native American-themed shops. The retail areas are located throughout the Casino of the Earth and Casino of the Sky, as well as along connecting concourses near the hotel towers and arena.

Retail tenants have included Coach, Tommy Bahama, Sephora, Brookstone, and various specialty stores offering apparel, gifts, jewelry, and tribal art. Seasonal and promotional pop-up stores also rotate through dedicated retail kiosks within the promenade.

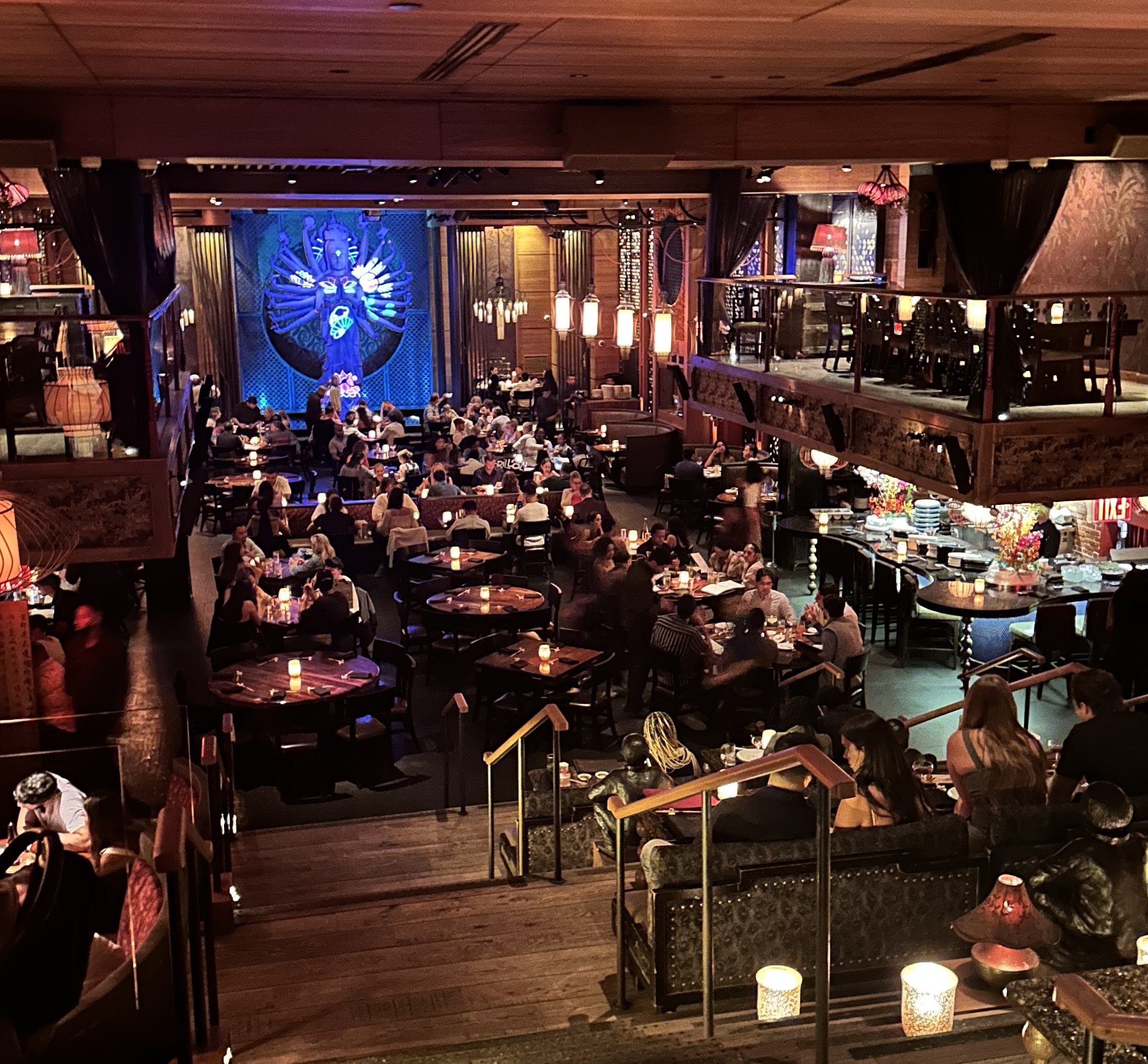
Interior of TAO Asian Bistro & Lounge, one of Mohegan Sun's upscale dining venues

Dining options at Mohegan Sun range from quick-service food courts to celebrity chef restaurants. Notable establishments include:

- Michael Jordan’s Steak House and MJ23 Sports Bar & Grill, operated in partnership with the former NBA player
- Todd English’s Tuscany, offering Mediterranean-inspired cuisine
- Bobby’s Burger Palace, founded by chef Bobby Flay
- Hash House A Go Go, known for large, “twisted farm food” dishes
- TAO Asian Bistro & Lounge, featuring pan-Asian cuisine and nightclub-style ambiance

The resort also includes the Seasons Buffet and a range of bars and lounges, such as novelle, Vista Lounge, and The Lansdowne Irish Pub & Music House.

Dining and retail offerings have evolved over the years to reflect changing guest preferences, seasonal events, and partnerships with national brands. The layout is designed to be accessible from all major resort areas, including the casino floor, hotel lobbies, and the arena concourse.

== Entertainment ==
=== Mohegan Sun Arena ===
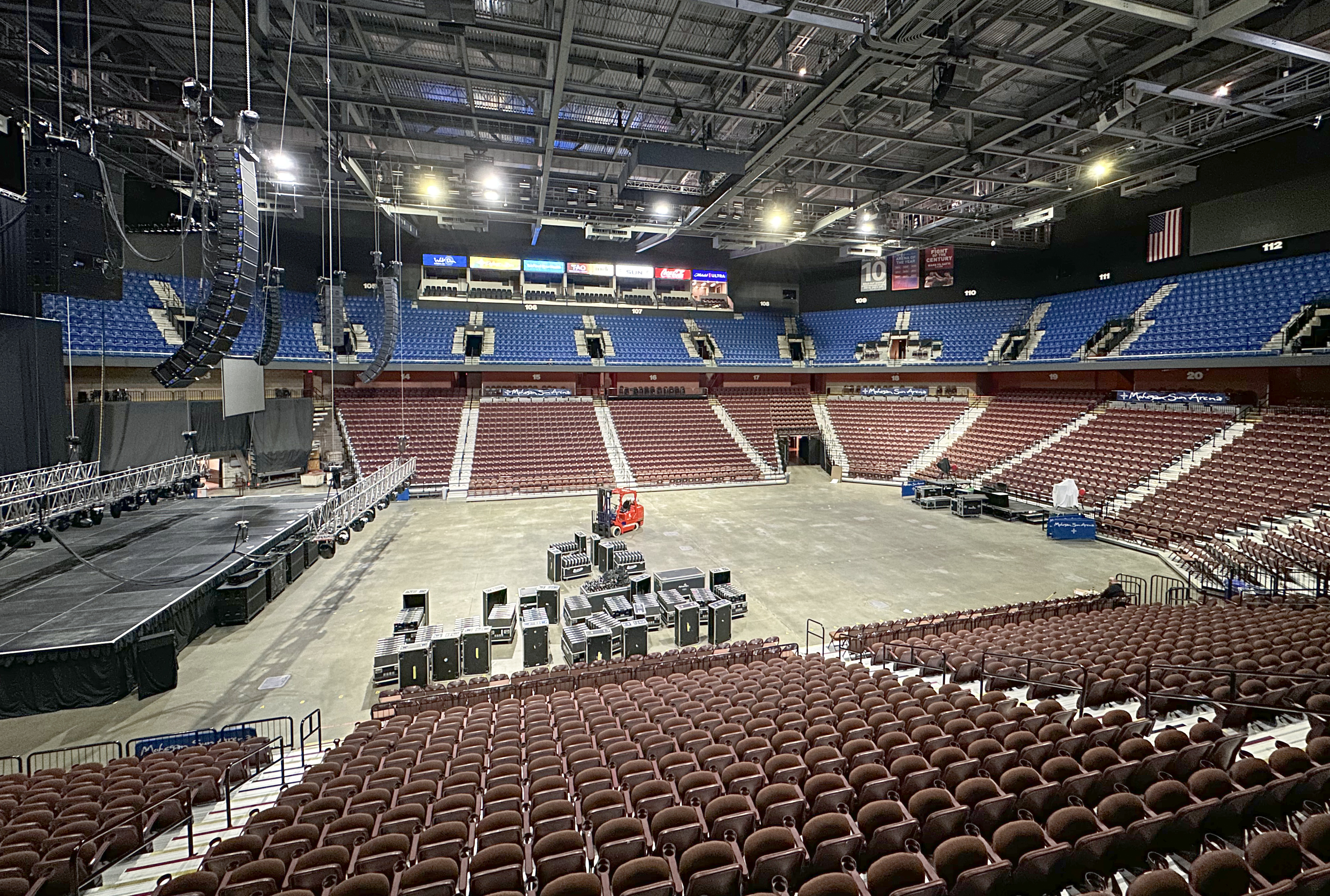
Interior of Mohegan Sun Arena during concert setup

The Mohegan Sun Arena is a 10,000-seat multi-purpose indoor arena located within the Mohegan Sun resort. It opened in 2001 and has since become one of the leading entertainment venues in New England for concerts, sporting events, and televised productions.

The arena is best known as the home of the Connecticut Sun, a professional women's basketball team that competes in the Women's National Basketball Association (WNBA). The Sun began playing at the arena in 2003 after being acquired by the Mohegan Tribe from the defunct Orlando Miracle franchise. The Mohegan Sun Arena was the first major professional sports venue in the United States to be owned and operated by a Native American tribe.

In addition to basketball, the arena regularly hosts concerts by internationally known artists, comedy shows, family events, and special performances. It has been the site of televised boxing and mixed martial arts events, including bouts promoted by Premier Boxing Champions and Bellator MMA. The venue is equipped with luxury suites, VIP seating areas, and adaptable staging configurations to support a wide range of events.

The arena connects directly to the casino and hotel towers, allowing guests to access shows and sporting events without leaving the resort complex. Parking garages and dedicated entryways support high-attendance events, and the venue is accessible year-round.

=== Other venues ===
In addition to the Mohegan Sun Arena, the resort features several smaller venues that host live performances, comedy acts, and free entertainment throughout the year.

The Wolf Den is an intimate, 300-seat venue located in the center of the Casino of the Earth. It offers free nightly performances from a variety of musical genres, including rock, country, R&B, and tribute acts. Performers have included both emerging artists and nationally recognized names, and no ticket or cover charge is required, though seating is on a first-come, first-served basis.

The resort also includes a 350-seat Cabaret Theatre, which has hosted stand-up comedy, live theater, small concerts, and private events. Its flexible seating and stage design allow for varied programming and corporate rentals.

In 2015, the Comix Comedy Club relocated from nearby Foxwoods Resort Casino to Mohegan Sun. The venue features stand-up comedy performances several nights a week, along with themed events and occasional live podcast recordings. Comix is situated near the Earth Tower and offers full-service dining and bar access.

These venues collectively support Mohegan Sun’s position as a year-round entertainment destination, complementing the larger shows and sporting events hosted at the arena.

== Design and architecture ==
=== Thematic elements ===
Mohegan Sun was designed to reflect the traditions and symbolism of the Mohegan Tribe. The casino is divided into thematic sections representing the four seasons: Winter, Spring, Summer, and Fall. These are echoed in the décor, lighting schemes, and even the design of playing cards used on the gaming floor, each suit depicting a 20th-century Native American figure.

=== Wombi Rock and other features ===
A central visual highlight of the resort is Wombi Rock, a three-story crystal mountain composed of over 12,000 pieces of hand-selected onyx sourced from Iran, Pakistan, and Mexico, then fused in Carrara, Italy. The formation is internally illuminated and situated within the Casino of the Sky, beneath a domed ceiling designed to simulate celestial motion with fiber optics.

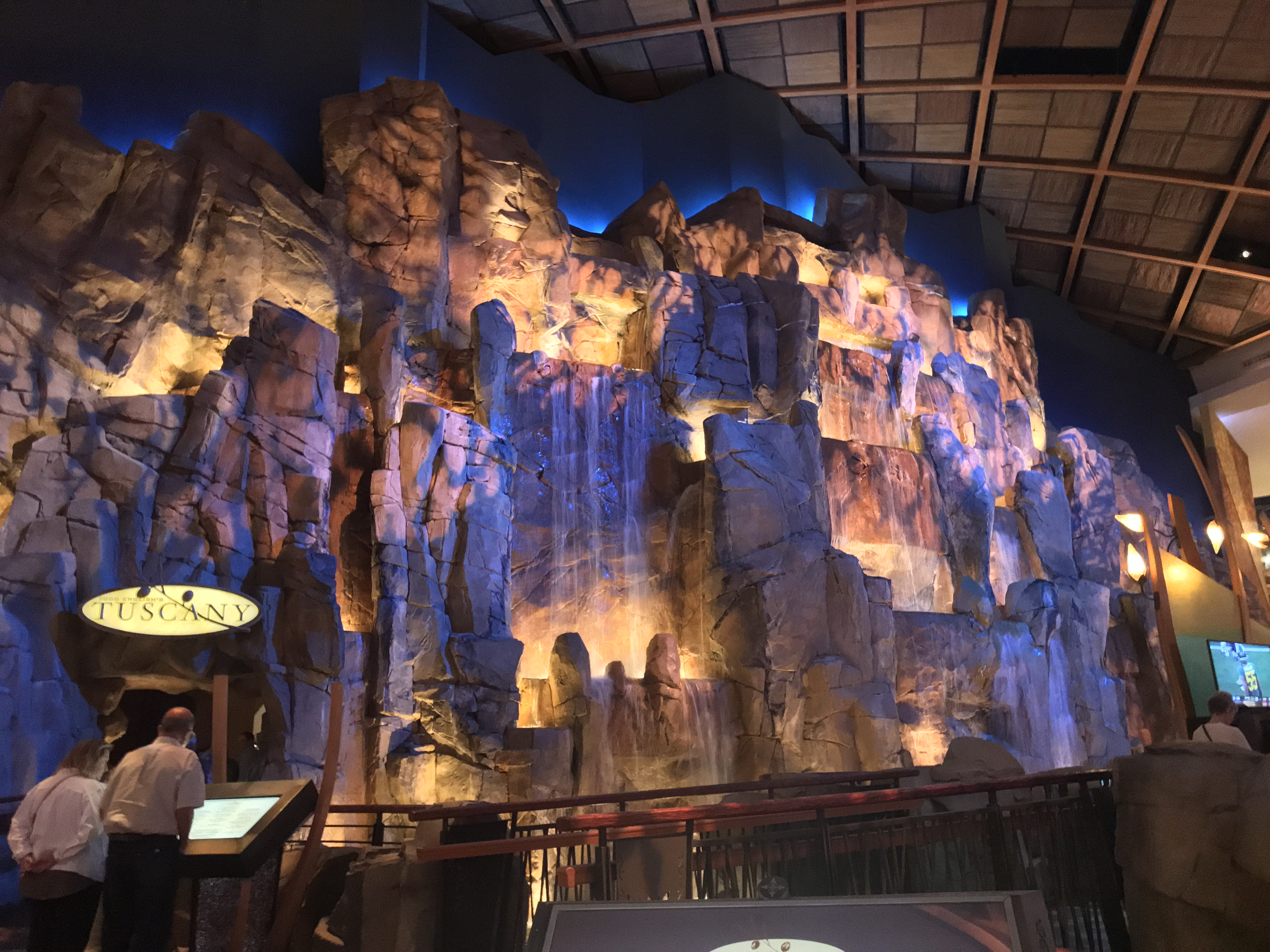
An artificial waterfall in the shopping concourse near the Sky Tower

Another notable feature is Taughannick Falls, a 55-foot indoor waterfall meant to symbolize a treacherous crossing point in the Mohegan Tribe’s migration history. Mechanical wolves placed throughout the property occasionally animate and howl, reinforcing the tribal motif.

=== Architectural design ===
The overall layout of Mohegan Sun integrates symbolic natural elements with modern resort functionality. The curved glass exterior of the Sky Tower, for example, was designed to evoke the movement of wind or flowing water. Interior walkways, fountains, and decorative features aim to immerse guests in a space that blends Native heritage with contemporary entertainment design.

== Economic impact ==
Mohegan Sun is one of the largest employers in southeastern Connecticut, with an estimated workforce of approximately 8,000 employees as of 2018. The resort plays a major role in the local economy by supporting jobs in hospitality, gaming, retail, food service, and entertainment.

The casino contributes a significant share of its slot machine revenue to the state of Connecticut, as required by a revenue-sharing agreement between the Mohegan Tribe and the state government. As of fiscal year 2018, Mohegan Sun reported net revenues of approximately $1.07 billion.

While the resort has generated substantial economic benefits for the Mohegan Tribe and surrounding municipalities, it has also faced financial challenges. By 2012, Mohegan Sun and its neighboring competitor, Foxwoods Resort Casino, were burdened with large debts stemming from economic downturns and increased competition from casinos in neighboring states.

In addition, some local governments have raised concerns about increased demand on public services, such as law enforcement, infrastructure, and social welfare programs, due to the volume of visitors and employees the resort brings into the region.

Despite these issues, Mohegan Sun remains a cornerstone of the region's tourism industry and continues to invest in its facilities and programming to attract new visitors.

== Attempted unionization ==
In 2012, table games dealers at Mohegan Sun began efforts to unionize through an affiliation with the United Auto Workers (UAW), the same union that represented dealers at nearby Foxwoods Resort Casino.

Mohegan Sun officials stated that tribal law permitted unionization and outlined a process for workers to organize. However, a letter sent by UAW Region 9A Director Julie Kushner to local and state officials accused management of discouraging organization and called for public support of the union effort.

In response, Mohegan Sun President and CEO Jeff Hartmann and Tribal Chairman Bruce "Two Dogs" Bozsum issued a statement to employees expressing their belief that unionization would undermine the existing relationship between management and staff. They argued that employees would be better served through direct communication rather than third-party representation.

The unionization effort did not result in an election or formal certification. In 2018, UAW international representative Karen Rosenberg stated that Mohegan Sun had “discouraged them from unionization and was successful.”

== In popular culture ==
Mohegan Sun has been featured in various aspects of popular media, including film, television, and music.

In 2014, the property was the focus of an episode of the reality television series Undercover Boss. The episode featured then-Mohegan Tribal Chairman Bruce "Two Dogs" Bozsum working in disguise at several frontline roles throughout the resort.

The 2019 film Uncut Gems, starring Adam Sandler, included scenes that were both set and filmed on location at Mohegan Sun. The casino served as the setting for the film’s climax, which involved a high-stakes sports bet placed on an NBA basketball game. The Mohegan Sun Racebook served as the setting for a fictional sportsbook, as Connecticut does not currently allow traditional sports betting at tribal casinos, and therefore Mohegan Sun has no actual sportsbook.

American pop singer Ariana Grande filmed portions of the music video for her 2019 single “Monopoly” at Mohegan Sun. The video was shot on location during her stop in Uncasville as part of the Sweetener World Tour and features shots of the casino property and its venues.

== See also ==
- Gambling in Connecticut
- List of casinos in the United States
- Native American gaming
- List of integrated resorts
- Mohegan
- Mohegan Tribe
