= Jessica Linnebach =

- Born: Edmonton, Alberta, Canada
- Genre: Classical
- Occupation: violinist
- Instrument: Violin

Jessica Linnebach (born 1983 in Edmonton, Alberta) is a Canadian classical violinist. She is a founding member of the Zukerman Chamber Players, as well as the Associate Concertmaster of the National Arts Centre Orchestra. Linnebach plays the Taft Stradivarius (1700) on loan from the Canada Council for the Arts.

Since her solo debut at the age of seven, Linnebach has performed with top orchestras, including those of Philadelphia, Toronto, Montreal, Calgary, and Vancouver.

At the age of ten, Linnebach was one of the youngest students admitted to the Curtis Institute of Music, in Philadelphia, where she received her Bachelor of Music degree. At Curtis, Linnebach studied with Aaron Rosand and Jaime Laredo. Following Curtis, she completed a Masters of Music degree at the Manhattan School of Music, where she studied with Pinchas Zukerman.

Linnebach has twice won the Grand Prize at the Canadian Music Competition, has won major prizes at the Young Concert Artists and Philadelphia Orchestra competitions, and in 2000 won the Sylva M. Gelber Music Foundation Award presented to the most gifted Canadian musician under the age of 30.

In 2000, Linnebach was the soloist for the National Arts Centre Orchestra's historic tour of Europe and the Middle East, led by Pinchas Zukerman. As a well-renowned chamber musician, Linnebach has performed with artists who include Leon Fleischer, Gary Graffman, Lynn Harrell, Jaime Laredo, and Michael Tree, at venues that include the Tanglewood, Ravinia, Santa Fe, Verbier, Schleswig-Holstein, Aspen, and Banff festivals. As a member of the Zukerman Chamber Players, she has undertaken tours of the U.S., Canada, South America, and Europe in 2003, 2004, 2005, 2006, and 2007, and has recorded chamber music by Brahms, Dvorak, and Mozart under the Altara label.
