= Mike Haas =

American soccer player and coach

Personal information
- Full name: Michael Haas!
- Date of birth: February 3, 1958
- Place of birth: San Francisco, California, U.S.
- Height: 6 ft 0 in (1.83 m)
- Position: Defender

Youth career
- 1976–1977: Skyline College
- 1978–1979: Colorado College

Senior career*
Years	Team	Apps	(Gls)
1980	Dallas Tornado	1	(0)
1980–1982	Denver Avalanche (indoor)	69	(0)
- Colorado Comets
1990	Colorado Foxes		

Managerial career
- Colorado Foxes (assistant)
- * Club domestic league appearances and goals

Mike Haas is an American retired soccer defender who played professionally in the North American Soccer League and Major Indoor Soccer League. He has also served as an assistant coach with both professional and U.S. national teams.

In 1980, Haas began his professional career with the Dallas Tornado of the North American Soccer League. That fall, he moved to the Denver Avalanche of the Major Indoor Soccer League for two seasons. He later played for the Colorado Comets of the USISL. In 1990, he both played for and served as an assistant coach with the Colorado Foxes of the American Professional Soccer League.

Following his retirement from playing, Haas has coached at the youth level and served as an assistant coach with several U.S. national youth teams.
