= Jethro Marks =

Canadian violist

Jethro Marks is a Canadian/American classical violist. He is the founding violist of the Zukerman Chamber Players and the Principal Violist of the National Arts Centre Orchestra in Ottawa.

Jethro was born in Vancouver into a musical family, and began studies on the violin as a child. He made his solo debut at the age of 17 with the Loudoun Symphony in Virginia, performing Mendelssohn's Violin Concerto. Soon after he switched his focus to the viola, and began viola studies with Atar Arad at the Indiana University. In 1998 he began studies with Pinchas Zukerman at the Manhattan School of Music. Marks has won the Kuttner Quartet Competition, the Indiana University Concerto Competition, and the Manhattan School of Music Concerto Competition.

As a chamber musician, Marks has performed at prestigious festivals around the world including Ravinia, Aspen, Tanglewood, Santa Fe, Mostly Mozart, and the BBC Proms. He has performed at Carnegie Hall, Alice Tully Hall, and the Royal Albert Hall, and has collaborated with artists including Itzhak Perlman, Michael Tree, Yefim Bronfman, and Lynn Harrell. With the Zukerman Chamber Players he has performed over 40 concerts around the world and recorded two CDs since 2003. As a member of the Zukerman Chamber Players, he has undertaken tours of the U.S., Canada, South America, and Europe in 2003, 2004, 2005, 2006, and 2007, and has recorded chamber music by Brahms, Dvorak, and Mozart under the Altara label. In January 2007, Marks performed the World Premiere of Steven Gellman's Viola Concerto with the Ottawa Symphony Orchestra to critical acclaim.
