= Pinchas Zukerman =

Israeli-American violinist, violist, and conductor (born 1948)

- פנחס צוקרמן
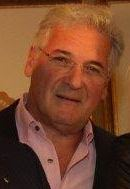
- Born: 16 July 1948 (age 78); Tel Aviv, Israel
- Occupations: Conductor; pedagogue; violinist; violist
- Years active: 1961–present
- Spouses: Eugenia Rich (m. 1968; div. 1983); Tuesday Weld (m. 1985; div. 2001); Amanda Forsyth (m. 2004)

Pinchas Zukerman (Hebrew: פנחס צוקרמן; born 16 July 1948) is an Israeli-American violinist, violist, and conductor.

== Life and career ==
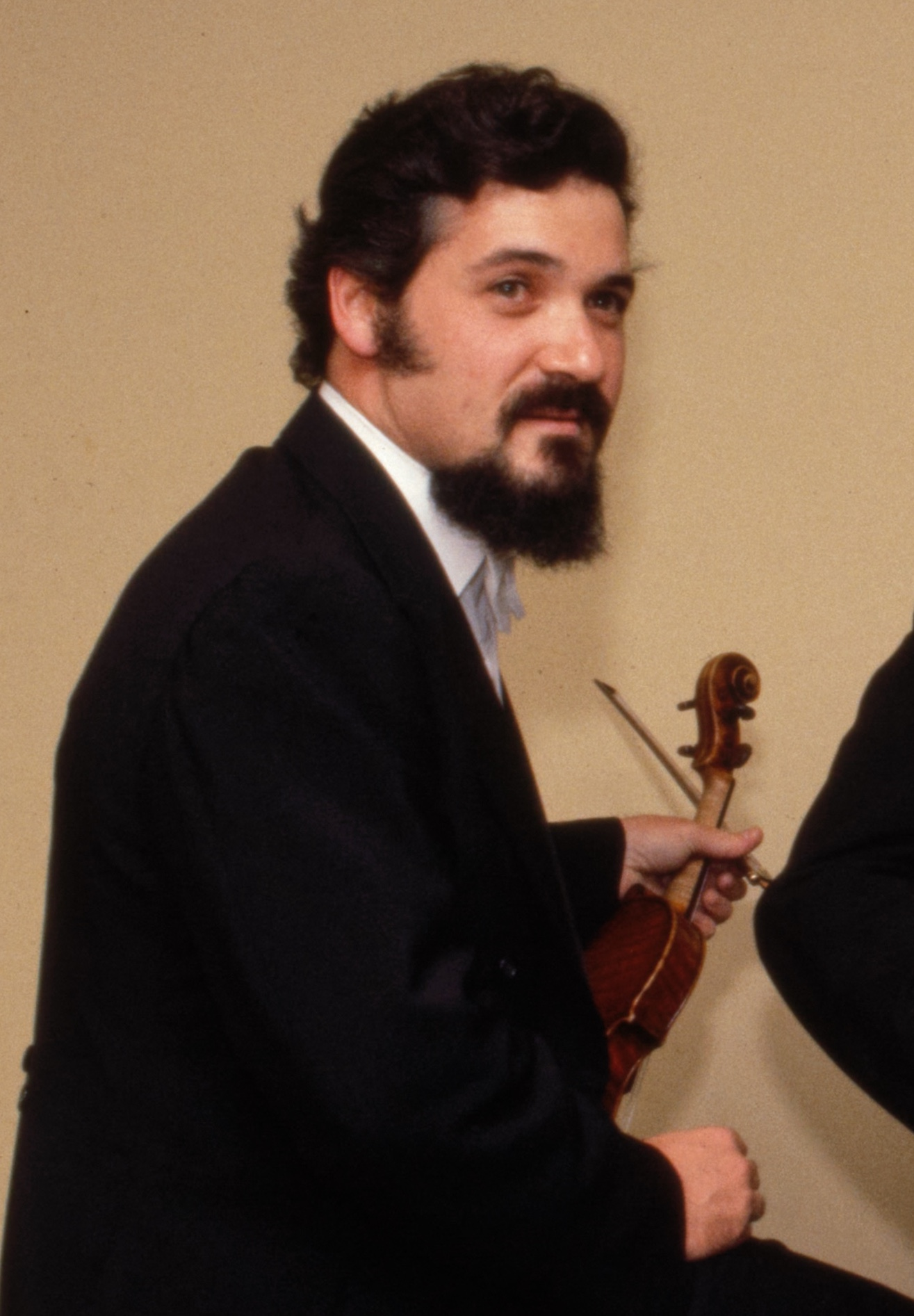
Zukerman in 1980

Zukerman was born in Tel Aviv, to Jewish parents and Holocaust survivors Yehuda and Miriam Lieberman Zukerman. He began his musical studies at age four, on the recorder. His father then taught him to play the clarinet and then the violin at age eight. Early studies were at the Samuel Rubin Academy of Music (now the Buchmann-Mehta School of Music). Isaac Stern and Pablo Casals learned of Zukerman's violin talent during a 1962 visit to Israel. Later that year, Zukerman moved to the United States to study at the Juilliard School under Stern and Ivan Galamian. He made his New York City performance debut in 1963. In 1967, he shared the Leventritt Prize with Korean violinist Kyung-wha Chung. His 1969 debut recordings—of the concerti by Tchaikovsky (with the London Symphony Orchestra conducted by Antal Dorati) and Mendelssohn (with the New York Philharmonic conducted by Leonard Bernstein)—launched a successful recording career of over 110 releases.

Zukerman launched his conducting career in 1970 with the English Chamber Orchestra, and served as director of London's South Bank Festival from 1971 to 1974. In the US, Zukerman was music director of the Saint Paul Chamber Orchestra from 1980 to 1987. He later directed the summer festivals of the Dallas Symphony Orchestra (1991–95) and the Baltimore Symphony Orchestra (1996–99). In 1998, he became Music Director of Canada's National Arts Centre Orchestra (NACO) in Ottawa, where he was reported to have polarized the orchestra members and required facilitator intervention. Zukerman took a sudden leave in mid-December 2005 with Forsynth, before returning in 2006, at which point his contract was extended through 2011. He stepped down from the post for the final time in 2015. He has served as Principal Guest Conductor of the Royal Philharmonic Orchestra since 2009.

Zukerman is on the faculty at the Manhattan School of Music and is the leader and founder of the Zukerman Performance Program at the school. His former students include Koh Gabriel Kameda, Julian Rachlin, and Guy Braunstein. In 1999 he founded the National Arts Centre Young Artists Programme, which counts young musicians such as Viviane Hagner, Jessica Linnebach, and Antal Szalai as alumni. In 2006 Zukerman began his involvement in the Rolex Artistic Mentorship programme.

In 2021, in a virtual masterclass hosted by the Juilliard School, Zukerman angered many musicians, students, and teachers by reinforcing racial and cultural stereotypes. He told two sisters of half Japanese descent that they were playing too perfectly and needed to add more "soy sauce" to their playing, and said that they needed to play more lyrically and that people in Korea and Japan do not sing. He later explained, "It's not in their DNA." Juilliard decided to not release the video for further viewing. Zukerman has apologized for his "culturally insensitive" comments and said he will do better in the future. The Orpheus Chamber Orchestra subsequently dropped Zukerman from their 2022 concert.

Zukerman plays the "Dushkin" Guarneri del Gesù violin of 1742. His honors include the King Solomon Award, the National Medal of Arts (presented by President Reagan in 1983), the Isaac Stern Award for Artistic Excellence, and an honorary doctorate from Brown University.

== Personal life ==
Zukerman married flutist Eugenia Rich in 1968. The couple had two daughters together, opera singer Arianna Zukerman and blues and folk musician Natalia Zukerman. Zukerman and Eugenia frequently performed together until their separation in 1983. Zukerman was married to actress Tuesday Weld from 1985 to 2001. He and Weld owned homes in Santa Fe, New Mexico and Montauk, New York, the latter of which they bought after the murder-suicide of its previous owners, soap opera actress Gwyda Donhowe and Broadway producer Norman Kean. Zukerman and his third wife, cellist Amanda Forsyth, have been married since 2004 and primarily reside in Manhattan. They often perform together.

== Recordings ==
His recordings have received 21 Grammy nominations, and two Grammy wins. He has collaborated with filmmaker Christopher Nupen on several projects, and was the subject of Nupen's "Pinchas Zukerman: Here to Make Music" documentary of 1974. In 2003 he founded a string quintet, the Zukerman Chamber Players, which has released three CD recordings in addition to its roster of live performances.

== Discography ==
- 2015: Brahms: Double concerto – Symphony No. 4 (Analekta), AN2 8782
- 2016: Baroque Treasury (Analekta), AN2 8783
- 2016: Vaughan Williams & Elgar – Royal Philharmonic Orchestra (Decca)

== Sources ==
- Boris Schwarz: Great Masters of the Violin. From Corelli and Vivaldi to Stern, Zukerman and Perlman. Simon and Schuster, New York 1983.
- Darryl Lyman: Great Jews in Music. J. D. Publishers, Middle Village, NY 1986.
- Stanley Sadie, H. Wiley Hitchcock (Ed.): The new Grove dictionary of American music. Grove's Dictionaries of Music, New York, N.Y 1986.
- Kurtz Myers: Index to record reviews 1984–1987. G.K. Hall, Boston, Ma. 1989.
- Alan Rich: Masters of Music: Great artists at work. Preface by Nicolas Slonimsky, foreword by Isaac Stern, photographs by James Arkatov. Capra Press, Santa Barbara, Ca. 1990.

Preceded by Dennis Russell Davies	Music Director, Saint Paul Chamber Orchestra; 1980–1987	Succeeded by Christopher Hogwood
Preceded by Trevor Pinnock	Music Director, National Arts Centre Orchestra; 1999–2015	Succeeded by Shelley Alexander
