= Mohegan (company) =

Tribal-owned gaming, hospitality, and entertainment company based in Connecticut

- Type: Private
- Industry: Hospitality, gaming, entertainment
- Founded: 1996; 30 years ago
- Founder: Mohegan Tribe
- Headquarters: Mohegan Reservation, Uncasville, CT
- Key people: Ray Pineault (president & CEO)
- Products: Casinos, hotels, online gaming, sports franchises
- Owner: Mohegan Tribe
- Number of employees: Approx. 6,000 (2024)
- Subsidiaries: Mohegan Digital, Mohegan Pennsylvania, Mohegan Niagara
- Website: mohegangaming.com

Mohegan is an Mohegan-American entertainment and hospitality company owned by the federally recognized Mohegan Tribe of Connecticut. Headquartered in Uncasville, Connecticut, the company develops, owns, and operates a portfolio of integrated resorts and casinos around the world. Originally established as the Mohegan Tribal Gaming Authority (MTGA) in 1996, the company was later rebranded as Mohegan Gaming & Entertainment (MGE) before adopting the simplified brand Mohegan in 2022 to reflect its expanding global footprint.

Mohegan began operations with the launch of Mohegan Sun, a large-scale gaming and entertainment resort located on the tribe’s reservation land in southeastern Connecticut. Over time, the company expanded its holdings to include properties in Pennsylvania, New Jersey, Nevada, Washington, and Ontario. Its first overseas project, the Inspire Entertainment Resort in Incheon, South Korea, partially opened in 2023 but was later subject to financial and operational challenges.

In addition to its gaming operations, Mohegan has pursued strategic diversification in professional sports and digital entertainment. It owns the Connecticut Sun of the Women's National Basketball Association (WNBA) and previously owned the New England Black Wolves of the National Lacrosse League (NLL). The company also manages online gaming through its Mohegan Digital division and has adopted artificial intelligence and data analytics to modernize its resort operations.

While owned by the Mohegan Tribe, the company is governed by the Tribe’s elected council and operates as a tribal business enterprise under the Mohegan Constitution. Mohegan operates as a for-profit entity under tribal governance, reinvesting revenues into both tribal and corporate development initiatives.

== History ==
=== Origins and Mohegan Sun (Connecticut) ===
The company originated in the early 1990s as an initiative of the Mohegan Tribe to achieve economic self-sufficiency following its federal recognition in 1994. That same year, the United States Congress passed the Mohegan Nation (Connecticut) Land Claim Settlement Act, which cleared the way for the tribe to reclaim reservation land along the Thames River and enter into a gaming compact with the State of Connecticut.

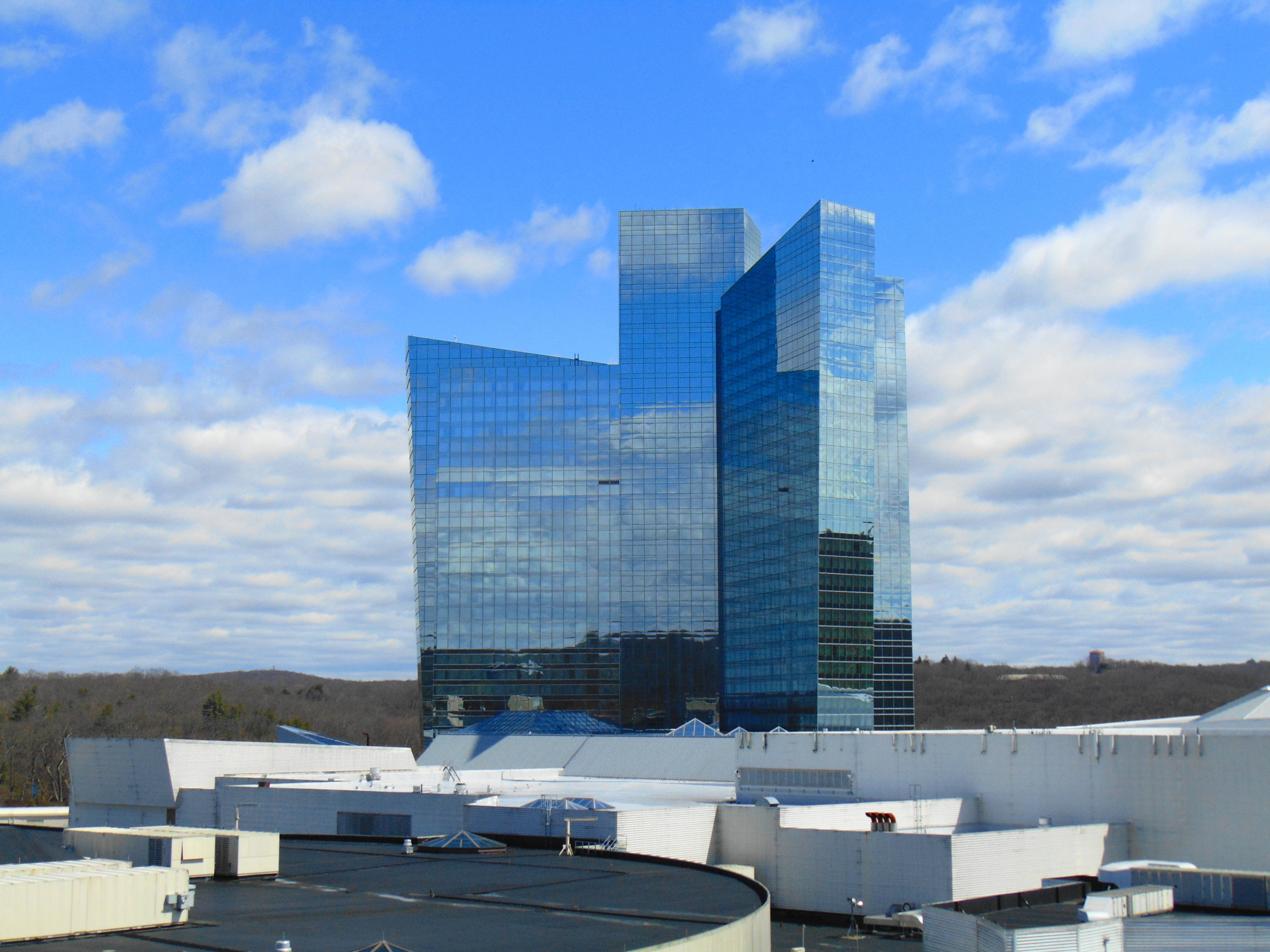
The Sky Tower hotel at Mohegan Sun in Uncasville, Connecticut, the company’s flagship property.

To develop its first casino, the tribe partnered with Trading Cove Associates (TCA), a joint venture that provided financing, legal services, and operational support. The collaboration enabled the launch of Mohegan Sun on October 12, 1996. Built on 240 acres of tribal land in Uncasville, Connecticut, the resort featured extensive gaming, retail, dining, and entertainment offerings and quickly became one of the largest casinos in the United States.

In 2000, full control of the property was transferred to the Mohegan Tribe, though TCA continued to receive a 5% share of gross revenues until 2014 under the terms of their original agreement. Mohegan Sun became the foundation for the newly created Mohegan Tribal Gaming Authority (MTGA), which would later evolve into the company now known as Mohegan.

The success of Mohegan Sun established the tribe as a major player in the gaming industry and provided a sustainable revenue base to support tribal services, infrastructure, and future business ventures. The property’s growth over time included expansions such as the Casino of the Sky, the 12,000-seat Mohegan Sun Arena, and multiple hotel towers.

=== Rebranding and global vision ===
In the 2010s, the Mohegan Tribal Gaming Authority began to pursue an expansion strategy beyond its Connecticut base, prompting a reassessment of its public identity. As part of this effort, the organization adopted the name Mohegan Gaming & Entertainment (MGE) in 2017 to reflect its dual focus on gaming and hospitality ventures, both domestically and internationally.

In July 2022, the company simplified its name to Mohegan. According to executives, the rebrand was intended to align the company’s identity with its broader vision as a global developer and operator of integrated entertainment resorts.

This brand evolution paralleled the company’s increasing presence in new markets and its entry into international operations. The simplified name was seen as more adaptable to non-U.S. audiences and reflective of the tribe’s ambitions to become a worldwide hospitality and entertainment brand.

Although the company operates under a modern corporate structure with its own executive leadership, it is directly owned and governed by the Mohegan Tribe. Strategic decisions and oversight are carried out through the Tribe’s elected Tribal Council, which holds ultimate authority over the company’s direction and financial stewardship.

=== Timeline of expansion ===
Following the initial success of Mohegan Sun in Connecticut, the company embarked on a multi-decade expansion strategy aimed at diversifying its geographic footprint and revenue sources. Beginning in the early 2000s, Mohegan pursued new developments and acquisitions across the United States, Canada, and Asia. These expansions included a mix of wholly owned properties, joint ventures, and management contracts.

- 2005 – Mohegan acquired the Pocono Downs racetrack in Pennsylvania from Penn National Gaming and later redeveloped it as Mohegan Sun at Pocono Downs, the first slots-only casino to open in the state.
- 2006–2010 – Mohegan announced a $740 million expansion of its flagship property in Connecticut, known as Project Horizon, including a new hotel and a "Casino of the Wind." The project was suspended during the Great Recession and formally terminated in 2010.
- 2012 – Mohegan entered the Atlantic City market by taking over management of Resorts Casino Hotel, making it one of the first Native American-owned entities to operate a property in the city.
- 2013–2014 – Mohegan pursued casino development in Massachusetts, proposing sites in Palmer and Revere. The Palmer project was rejected by voters, and the Revere proposal ultimately lost to Wynn Resorts’ Everett bid.

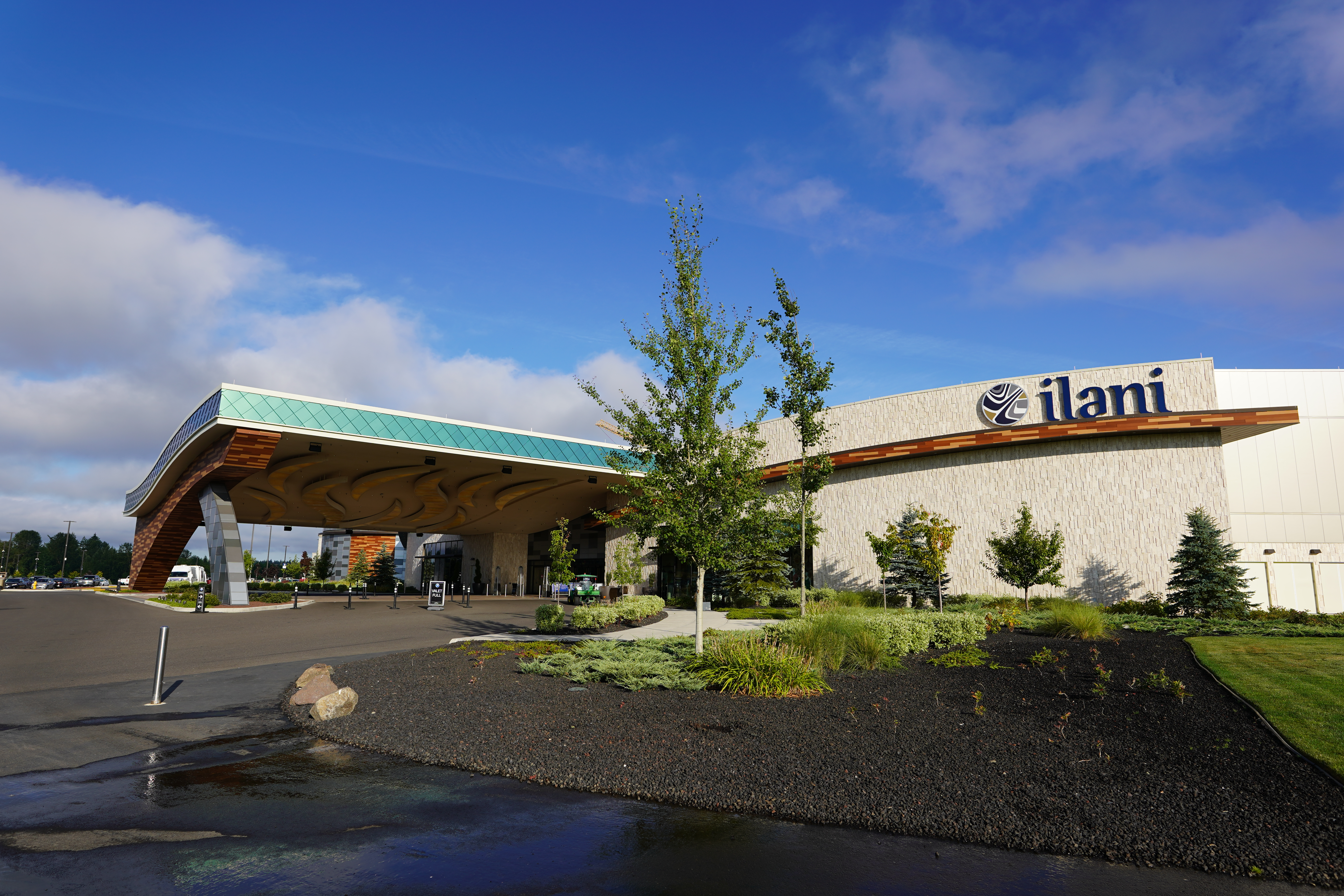
Entrance of ilani Casino Resort in Ridgefield, Washington, operated by Mohegan, August 2020.

- 2017 – The company partnered with the Cowlitz Indian Tribe to develop and operate ilani Casino Resort in Ridgefield, Washington, marking Mohegan’s first joint venture in the Pacific Northwest.
- 2019 – Mohegan was awarded a 21-year contract to manage Fallsview Casino Resort and Casino Niagara in Ontario, Canada, its first international operation.
- 2021 – The company became the first Native American tribe to operate a casino in Las Vegas through a partnership with Virgin Hotels, managing the gaming operations at the rebranded Virgin Hotels Las Vegas.
- 2023 – Mohegan opened the Inspire Entertainment Resort near Incheon International Airport in South Korea, a $1.6 billion integrated resort that marked its largest international project to date.

These milestones reflect the company's transition from a single-property tribal operation into a diversified global entertainment brand. Each expansion was tailored to regional markets, while reinforcing the company’s underlying identity as a tribally owned and governed enterprise.

== Operations ==
=== Domestic properties ===
Mohegan operates several gaming and entertainment properties across the United States, many of which are either wholly owned or managed under tribal or commercial agreements. These properties range from regional casinos to full-scale integrated resorts, and they reflect the company’s strategy of geographic diversification beyond its flagship Connecticut location.

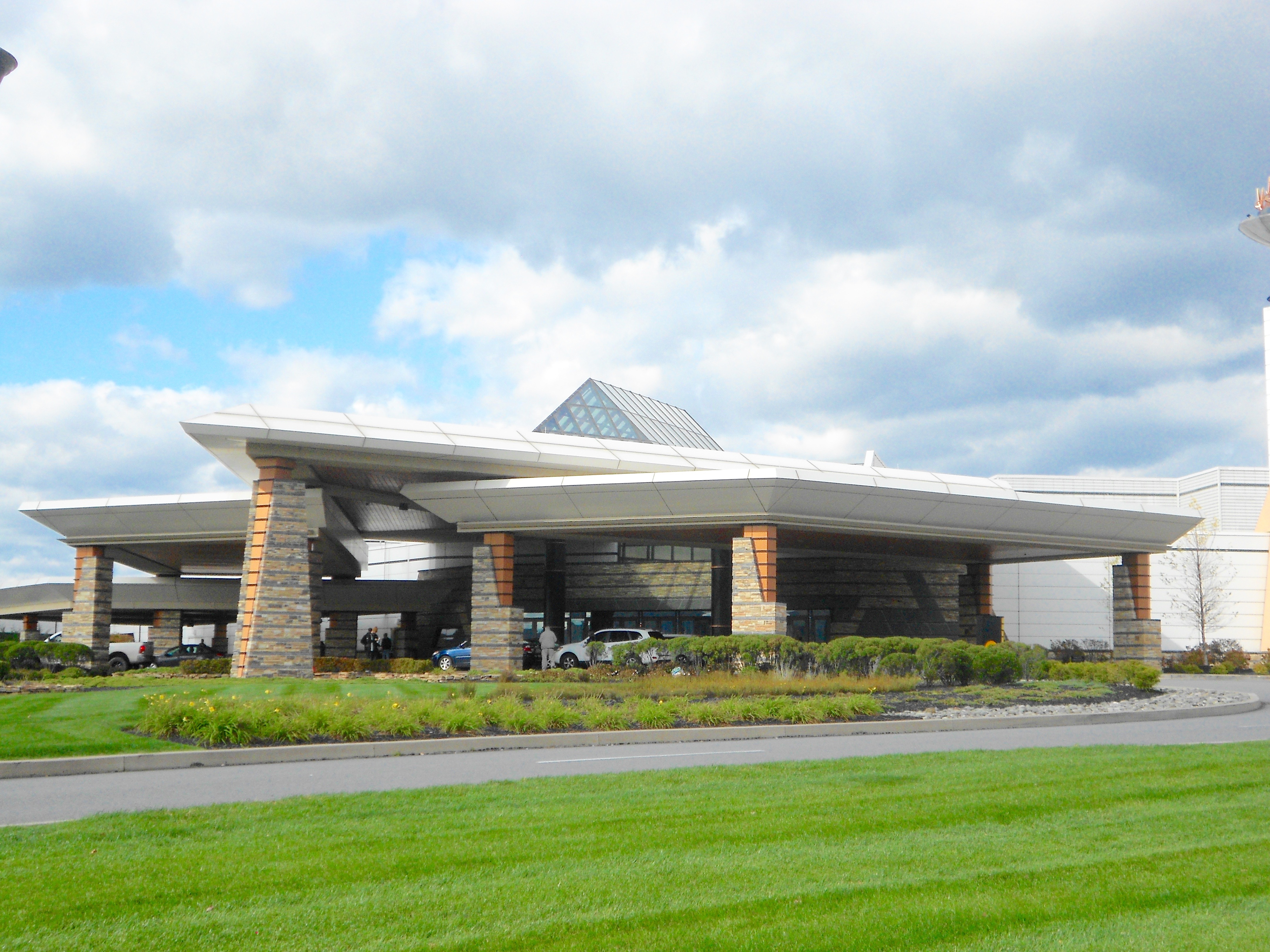
Exterior view of Mohegan Pennsylvania, formerly known as Pocono Downs, in Luzerne County, PA.

The company’s first expansion beyond its reservation was in 2005, with the acquisition and redevelopment of Pocono Downs in Pennsylvania. Initially branded as Mohegan Sun at Pocono Downs, the property became the first legal slots casino in the state and includes a harness racing track. In 2022, the facility was rebranded as Mohegan Pennsylvania as part of a broader corporate initiative to unify branding and reflect the company's evolving identity.

In 2012, Mohegan assumed management of Resorts Casino Hotel in Atlantic City, New Jersey. This marked one of the first times a Native American tribe operated a commercial casino outside of tribal land and was seen as a milestone in tribal gaming history.

In partnership with the Cowlitz Indian Tribe, Mohegan helped develop and operates ilani, a casino and entertainment resort in Ridgefield, Washington. The facility opened in 2017 and serves the greater Portland and Vancouver metro regions.

Mohegan operates the casino at Virgin Hotels Las Vegas under a management agreement that began in 2021. The property marked the first time a tribal operator was licensed to manage a casino in the Las Vegas market.

Across its U.S. properties, Mohegan oversees gaming operations, resort amenities, and customer loyalty programs.

Mohegan had bid to develop an integrated resort in New York City with their proposed Freedom Plaza development. Mohegan would have needed to secure a casino license in New York in order to proceed with the project. The proposal was ultimately rejected by a community advisory committee.

=== International operations ===
Mohegan began expanding internationally in the late 2010s, marking a significant shift in its strategic scope. These ventures allowed the company to establish a presence in regulated markets outside the United States and demonstrate its capabilities as a global hospitality and entertainment brand.

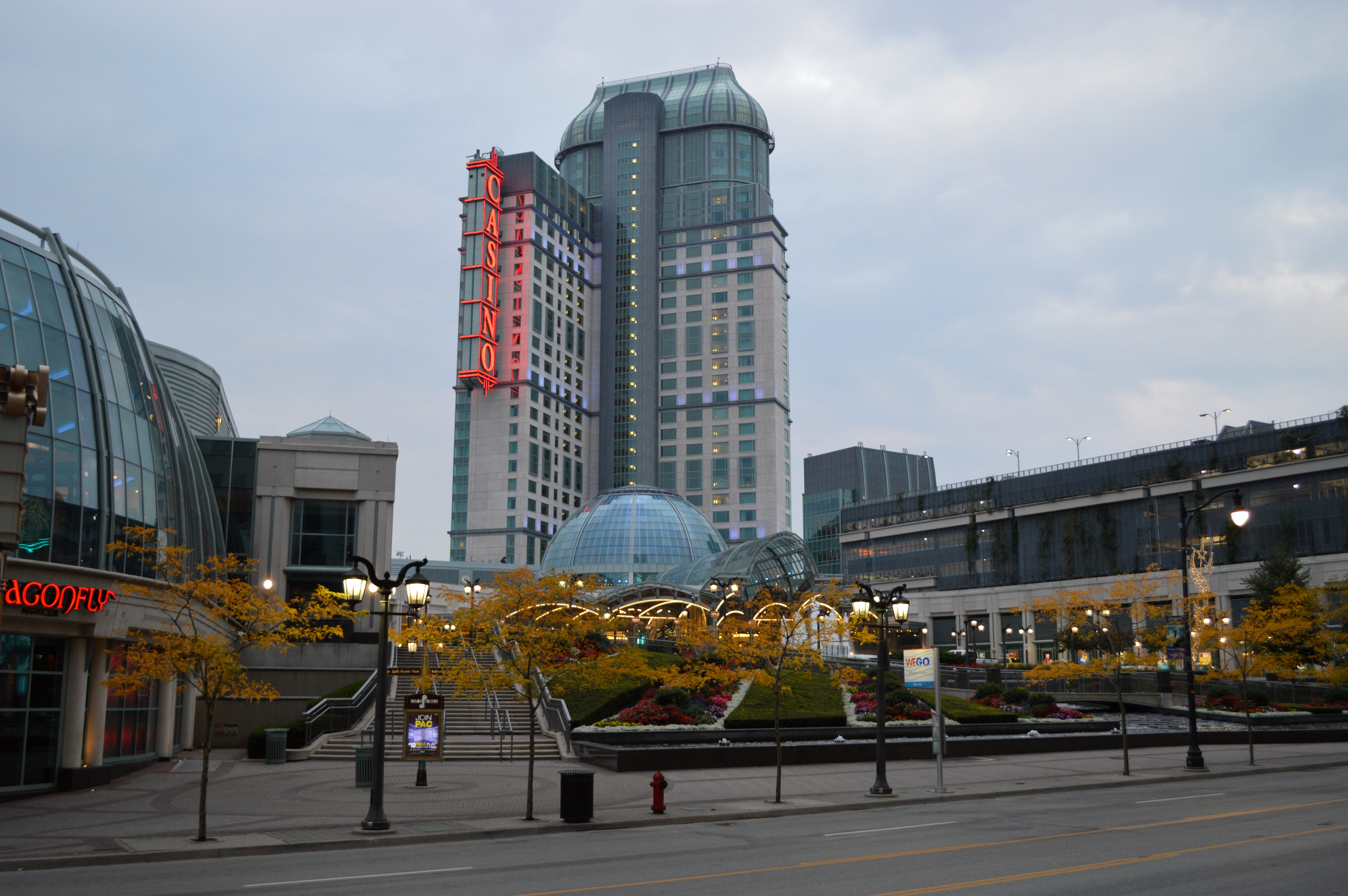
Outside view of the Mohegan-operated Fallsview Casino Resort tower in Ontario, 2023.

In 2019, Mohegan was awarded a 21-year management contract by the Ontario Lottery and Gaming Corporation to operate two major casinos in Niagara Falls, Canada: Fallsview Casino Resort and Casino Niagara. The agreement marked the company’s first international operation and included oversight of gaming, marketing, and facility operations.

Mohegan’s most ambitious international project to date is the Inspire Entertainment Resort, located adjacent to Incheon International Airport in South Korea. Announced in 2016 and partially opened in 2023, the resort was designed as a large-scale, integrated entertainment complex featuring gaming, hotels, retail, and a Paramount-branded theme park.

The project represented a major financial undertaking for the company, with an estimated total cost of $1.6 billion. Though it aimed to capitalize on the region’s tourism and convention traffic, Inspire faced a range of operational and financial challenges in its early phases. Mohegan ultimately ceded day-to-day operational control to Bain Capital in 2025 following loan defaults, raising questions about the long-term viability of the resort under tribal ownership.

Despite these setbacks, Mohegan has stated its continued interest in maintaining an international presence and has not ruled out future opportunities in other global markets.

== Sports and entertainment ventures ==
=== Connecticut Sun ===
In 2003, Mohegan acquired the Connecticut Sun, a franchise in the Women's National Basketball Association (WNBA). The team was relocated from Orlando, Florida, and became the first professional sports franchise owned by a Native American tribe. The Connecticut Sun play their home games at the Mohegan Sun Arena in Uncasville, Connecticut, adjacent to the company’s flagship casino resort.

The ownership of the team has been positioned by Mohegan as part of a broader strategy to diversify its brand and promote women’s sports. The team has made multiple playoff appearances under tribal ownership and has been used as a platform to highlight Mohegan culture and female leadership, including through the design of custom jerseys incorporating tribal symbols and language.

In 2025, it was reported that the Mohegan Tribe was evaluating strategic options for the team, including a potential sale or relocation. These considerations were attributed to changing financial conditions and the company’s efforts to reassess its broader entertainment portfolio.

The Connecticut Sun remains one of the most prominent tribal-owned sports ventures in North America and has served as a model for integrating professional athletics with tribal cultural identity.

=== New England Black Wolves ===
Mohegan was the majority owner of the New England Black Wolves, a professional box lacrosse team in the National Lacrosse League (NLL). The team was originally the Philadelphia Wings before being relocated to Uncasville, Connecticut, in 2014, where they played at the Mohegan Sun Arena.

The Black Wolves were part of Mohegan's broader initiative to diversify its entertainment offerings and increase year-round use of the arena adjacent to its flagship resort. The team competed in the NLL through the 2020 season and attracted a regional fan base in southern New England.

In 2021, Mohegan sold the franchise to a new ownership group that relocated the team to Albany, New York, where it now competes as the Albany FireWolves. The sale was announced in the context of the COVID-19 pandemic’s disruption to indoor sports and was framed as a strategic decision to focus the company’s resources on other ventures.

Although the Black Wolves tenure was relatively short-lived, the team represented another example of Mohegan’s efforts to expand its brand through professional sports and regional entertainment partnerships.

=== Entertainment and media partnerships ===
In addition to its gaming and sports ventures, Mohegan has developed a range of partnerships and investments in live entertainment, media, and hospitality. The company operates large performance venues at several of its properties, including the 10,000-seat Mohegan Sun Arena in Connecticut, which hosts concerts, comedy shows, boxing events, and other live entertainment throughout the year.

The company has collaborated with promoters and producers to bring touring acts and branded shows to its venues. Mohegan Sun has hosted televised sporting events and partnered with streaming platforms for live event distribution, though these arrangements have generally been event-specific rather than long-term media holdings.

Mohegan has occasionally appeared in popular culture. Its flagship property was featured in a 2014 episode of Undercover Boss, in which then-tribal chairman Bruce "Two Dogs" Bozsum participated undercover as an employee. The Mohegan Sun Casino also served as a filming location for the climax of the 2019 film Uncut Gems, and has been used in music videos and promotional content.

While entertainment and media are not independent revenue streams for the company, they form an integral part of Mohegan’s strategy to attract a broad consumer base and reinforce its properties as destination resorts.

== Inspire Korea and strategic missteps ==
=== Development and vision ===
Mohegan’s entry into the South Korean market began in 2016, when it was selected as the preferred bidder to develop a large-scale integrated resort near Incheon International Airport. The project, named Inspire Entertainment Resort, was planned as a multiphase development intended to serve both international tourists and the growing regional entertainment market.

Inspire was designed to include a foreigner-only casino, multiple hotel towers, a 15,000-seat arena, high-end retail and dining, a convention center, and what was billed as the world’s first Paramount-branded theme park. Mohegan described the development as a strategic cornerstone of its international growth, aimed at diversifying its portfolio and positioning the company as a global entertainment operator.

Initial construction phases were delayed due to pandemic-related disruptions, supply chain issues, and permitting processes, but a partial opening was achieved in late 2023. The project’s first operational phase included a hotel, non-gaming entertainment spaces, and limited casino operations open to foreign nationals only, in compliance with South Korean law.

Inspire represented the largest single capital investment in Mohegan’s history, with the company committing over $1.6 billion in total project costs. At the time of its launch, executives promoted the resort as a long-term anchor for Mohegan’s expansion in Asia and a potential model for future international projects.

=== Financial collapse and Bain takeover ===
Despite initial optimism surrounding the Inspire Entertainment Resort, the project encountered significant financial and operational challenges. By late 2024, Mohegan faced mounting cost overruns, underperformance in projected tourism recovery, and delays in revenue generation from key components of the resort. The company had financed much of the development through loans backed by private equity and institutional investors, including Bain Capital.

In early 2025, Mohegan defaulted on certain loan covenants, triggering enforcement actions by creditors. Bain Capital, which held significant rights under the financing terms, exercised its option to assume operational control of the resort. Though Mohegan retained its equity stake, day-to-day management and strategic decision-making were transferred to Bain-appointed leadership.

The loss of control over Inspire was widely viewed as a major setback for Mohegan's international ambitions and raised questions about the sustainability of its global expansion strategy. Industry analysts cited insufficient contingency planning, reliance on optimistic tourism forecasts, and exposure to foreign regulatory risk as contributing factors to the outcome.

Company officials issued statements reaffirming their commitment to international markets and expressed hope that the Inspire project would stabilize under new management. However, financial disclosures from early 2025 showed a substantial impairment loss associated with the project, leading to the largest net loss in the company's history for that fiscal year.

== Digital and innovation ==
=== Mohegan Digital ===
Mohegan launched its digital gaming division, Mohegan Digital, in July 2021 as part of its strategy to enter the fast-growing online gaming and sports betting markets. The division was created to oversee the development and management of the company’s online casino products, mobile sports betting platforms, and digital marketing initiatives across regulated jurisdictions.

The launch of Mohegan Digital coincided with the legalization of online gambling in several U.S. states, including Connecticut and New Jersey. In Connecticut, Mohegan partnered with FanDuel to operate the tribe's mobile sportsbook and online casino offerings under the Mohegan Sun brand. The partnership enabled the company to quickly enter the state-regulated market using FanDuel's existing technology and infrastructure.

Mohegan Digital also supports customer engagement tools across the company’s physical properties, including loyalty program integrations, geolocation-based promotions, and AI-driven personalization. The company has emphasized the role of digital operations in reaching younger consumers and in providing cross-channel consistency between its physical resorts and online platforms.

Executives have framed the digital division as a core pillar of the company's future growth, though its overall financial impact remains a smaller proportion of revenue compared to land-based operations.

=== Innovation and analytics ===
Mohegan has adopted data-driven strategies and technology platforms to enhance customer experience, optimize operations, and support long-term planning. Across its properties, the company employs advanced analytics for dynamic pricing, player segmentation, and targeted marketing, leveraging both in-house tools and third-party software providers.

Mohegan has implemented AI-assisted decision-making in areas such as slot floor layout, food and beverage demand forecasting, and loyalty program management. These initiatives are supported by centralized data teams that operate across the company’s domestic and international business units.

The company has invested in smart building technologies and real-time operational dashboards to manage energy consumption, staff allocation, and guest services. At its flagship resort in Connecticut, IoT sensors and automation systems have been deployed to monitor HVAC systems, lighting, and crowd density in high-traffic areas.

Mohegan has emphasized operational efficiency and guest personalization as key competitive advantages within the hospitality and gaming industries.

== Governance and structure ==
=== Tribal ownership and authority ===
Mohegan is wholly owned by the federally recognized Mohegan Tribe of Connecticut. The company operates as an instrumentality of the tribe and exists to generate revenue for tribal services, economic development, and community programs. It is not a publicly traded company and does not have outside shareholders.

Authority over the company rests with the Mohegan Tribal Council, an elected governing body that also serves as the board of directors for business purposes. The Council oversees major strategic decisions, approves budgets, and appoints executive leadership for the company’s day-to-day operations. This dual role is enabled by the tribe’s constitutional framework, which permits the establishment of tribal business entities and defines the powers and responsibilities of elected officials. While Mohegan operates under a corporate structure with a CEO and executive team, its governance remains rooted in tribal sovereignty.

Revenue generated by the company is used to fund tribal health services, housing, education, and cultural preservation initiatives. In this respect, Mohegan functions not only as a business enterprise but as an economic driver for the tribe’s long-term self-sufficiency and development.

=== Executive leadership and subsidiaries ===
Mohegan’s executive leadership is composed of a corporate management team led by a Chief Executive Officer, who is appointed by the Mohegan Tribal Council. The CEO oversees the company’s operations across all domestic and international markets and reports directly to the Council in its role as the governing board.

Executive appointments often reflect a blend of tribal representation and industry experience. The company has appointed both tribal citizens and external professionals to senior roles, including positions in gaming operations, hospitality, marketing, and finance.

Mohegan manages a network of subsidiaries and operating entities under its corporate umbrella. These include Mohegan Digital, which oversees online gaming initiatives, and various property-specific operating units such as Mohegan Pennsylvania and Mohegan Niagara. Each subsidiary functions with a degree of operational autonomy but remains accountable to the parent company and, by extension, the Tribal Council.

As the company expanded globally, it developed international corporate entities to comply with local regulatory and financial structures. Despite this diversification, all entities remain consolidated under the governance and ownership of the Mohegan Tribe.

== See also ==
- Mohegan Tribe
- Mohegan Sun
- Connecticut Sun
- National Indian Gaming Association
- Tribal sovereignty in the United States
- List of casino hotels
- List of integrated resorts
