= Du Pré (name) =

Du Pré is a name and may refer to:

== Given name ==
- Du Pré Alexander, 2nd Earl of Caledon (1777–1839), Irish peer, landlord, and colonial administrator

== Surname ==
- Caledon Du Pré (1803–1886), English politician
- Galliot du Pré (died 1560), Parisian bookseller and publisher
- Hilary du Pré (born 1942), English flautist and memoirist
- Iris du Pré (1914–1985), English pianist and composer
- Jacqueline du Pré (1945–1987), British cellist
- James Du Pré (1778–1870), English politician
- Jean du Pré, French painter
- Josias Du Pré (1721–1780), London merchant
- William Baring du Pré (1875–1946), British politician

== Middle name ==
- Francis du Pré Oldfield (1869–1928), English magistrate
- George Du Pré Porcher (1823–1876), English cricketer and barrister
- Henry Du Pre Labouchere (1831–1912), English politician
- Katharine DuPre Lumpkin (1897–1988), American writer and sociologist

== See also ==
- Du Pré (disambiguation)
