= Pre =

Pre or PRE may refer to:

- pre-, an English-language prefix meaning 'before'

== Arts, entertainment and media ==
- Pre (band), an English band 2005–2011
- Public Radio East, an NPR regional network in North Carolina, US
- "Pre", a song by Earl Sweatshirt from the 2013 album Doris

== Places ==
- Preston railway station, England, station code PRE
- Preston railway station, Melbourne, Australia, station code PRE
- Prince Edward station, Hong Kong, station code PRE

== Science and technology ==
- Microphone preamplifier, or pre
- Palm Pre, a smartphone
- Partial-redundancy elimination (PRE), a computer compiler optimization
- Personal Rescue Enclosure (PRE), for spacecraft
- Proportionate reduction of error, in statistics
- <pre>…</pre>, HTML element for pre-formatted text

== Other uses ==
- Steve Prefontaine (1951–1975), an American runner nicknamed "Pre"
- Andalusian horse (Pura Raza Española, PRE)

== See also ==
- Du Pré (disambiguation)
- Le Pré, the name of several communes of France
