= Kim Kyung-jun =

South Korean violinist (born 1987)

- Born: 11 May 1987 (age 38); Seoul, South Korea
- Genres: Classical
- Occupation: Violinist
- Instrument: 1981 Sergio Peresson

Korean name
- Hangul: 김경준
- RR: Gim Gyeongjun
- MR: Kim Kyŏngjun

Kim Kyung-jun (Korean: 김경준; born 11 May 1987) is a South Korean violinist.

== Background ==
Kim Kyung-jun was born in Anyang, Gyeonggi, South Korea. He began playing the violin at age of six. He attended Rutherford High School (in Rutherford, New Jersey, his hometown) and Yonsei University. His conclusion of eleven national music competitions in South Korea was the Complete Bach Sonatas for Violin Solo Recital at the Uijeongbu Arts Center.

He received professional music training at the Korea National University of Arts preparatory school, the Juilliard School pre-college (Diploma), and Yale University School of Music (Performance Degree Master of Music equivalent, 2009). At Yonsei University, he holds Bachelor of Arts, combined with partial studies at Seoul National University, National University of Singapore, Free University Berlin, Audencia Business School, and other short-term schools in international studies.

== Competition and awards ==
Kim received the first prize at the Jefferson Symphony Orchestra International Young Artist Competition in 2008, the shared first prize at the 2nd Korea Herald Music Competition in 2010, the first prize at the 15th Eumak Chunchu Concours in 2010, the second prize at the 12th Strad Competition of Korea in 2010, among other national music competitions which he won since he was 8.

In international music competitions, Kim received the diploma at the 29th Rodolfo Lipizer International Violin Competition in 2010, and the 36th Rodolfo Lipizer International Violin Competition in 2017, the third prize at the 5th Yokohama International Music Competition in 2011, the juried prize for encouragement sixth prize at the 60th Nishinihon International Music Competition in 2015, the absolute second prize (first place amongst group) in the no age limit Category I pre-finals round at the International Music Competition Svirel in 2017, and the second prize at the Malta International Music Competition 2017. His winnings of top prizes and honors at the six international music competitions in Slovenia, Bulgaria, Malta, Italy, and North America in 2016 and 2017 led to an honorable mention with good results at the Rising Stars Grand Prix International Music Competition Berlin 2018.

He was the recipient of the Salon de Virtuosi in 2006.

== Performances ==
Kim performed at the Euro Music Festival the Eumyoun Music Festival, the Great Mountains Music Festival, the Walnut Hill Summer Music Festival, and the Young Musicians Festival. His other performances were at the North American concert halls, Muttart Hall, Winspeare Center, the Lincoln Center, and Yale University.

In addition, he performed at the Metropolitan Museum of Art, the McGraw Hill Financial Young Artists Showcase, the Eugène Ysaÿe Sonatas recital, and the Amsterdam Airport Schiphol "Share your Talent" recital series.

== Instrument ==
Kim played the Antonio Stradivari "Lady Tannant" for a single special occasion concert and usually played the Guarneri School violin loaned from the Stradivari Society. Since 2008, he plays with the Sergio Peresson.
