= 5th Screen Actors Guild Awards =

- Awarded for: Outstanding motion picture and primetime television performances
- Date: March 7, 1999
- Location: Shrine Auditorium; Los Angeles, California
- Country: United States
- Presented by: Screen Actors Guild
- Website: www.sagawards.org

Television/radio coverage
- Network: TNT

The 5th Screen Actors Guild Awards, awarded by the Screen Actors Guild and honoring the best achievements in film and television performances for the year 1998, took place on March 7, 1999. The ceremony was held at the Shrine Exposition Center in Los Angeles, California, and was televised live by TNT.

The nominees were announced on January 26, 1999, by Salma Hayek and David Hyde Pierce.

== Winners and nominees ==
Winners are listed first and highlighted in boldface.

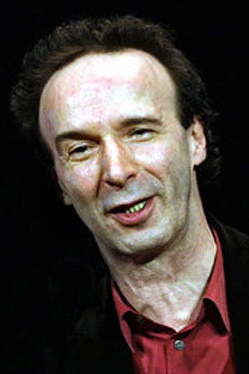
Roberto Benigni, Outstanding Performance by a Male Actor in a Leading Role winner

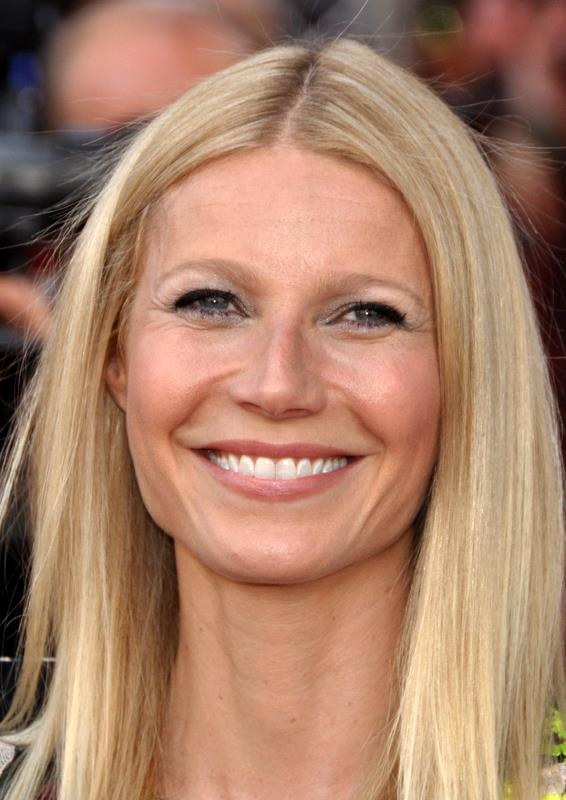
Gwyneth Paltrow, Outstanding Performance by a Female Actor in a Leading Role winner

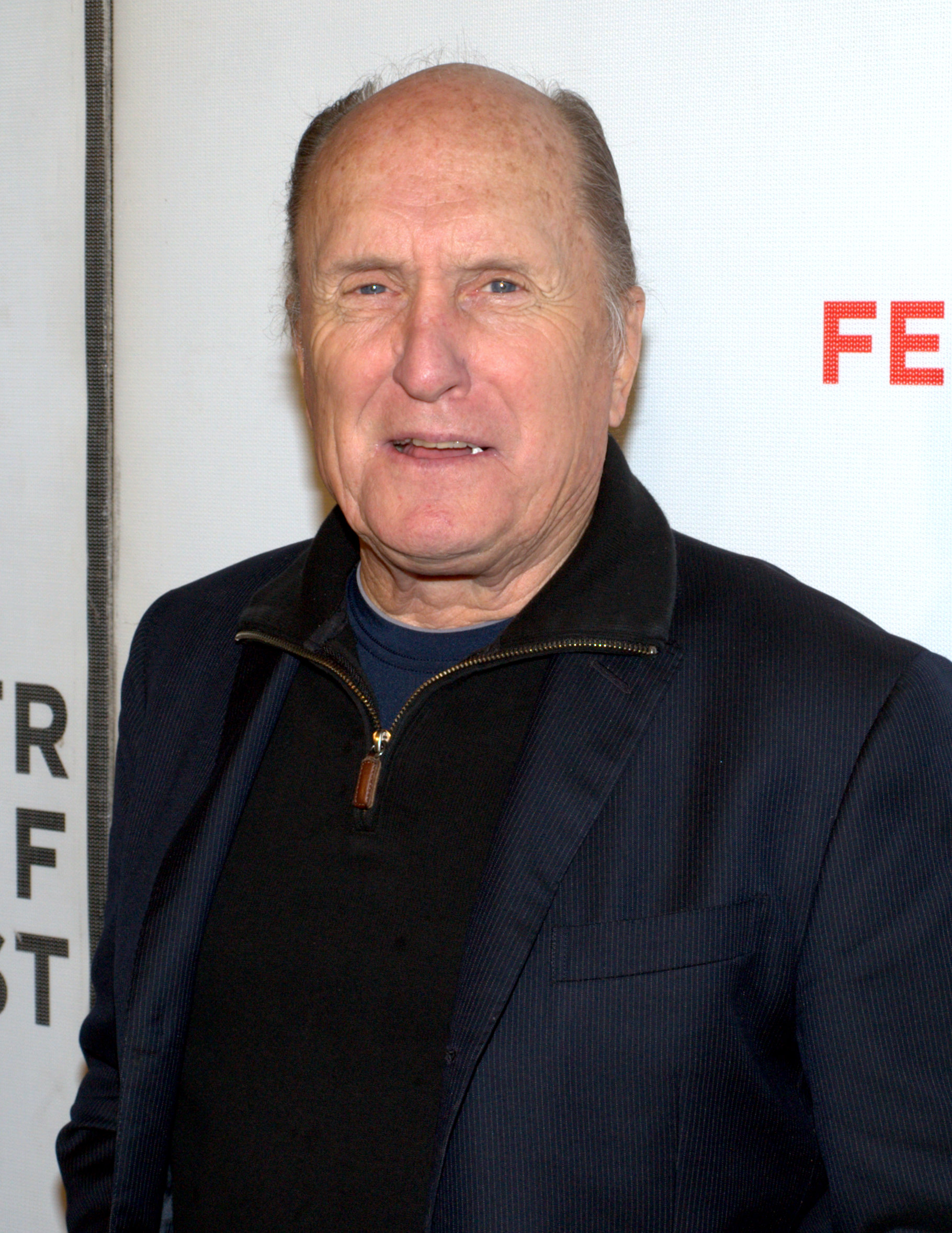
Robert Duvall, Outstanding Performance by a Male Actor in a Supporting Role winner

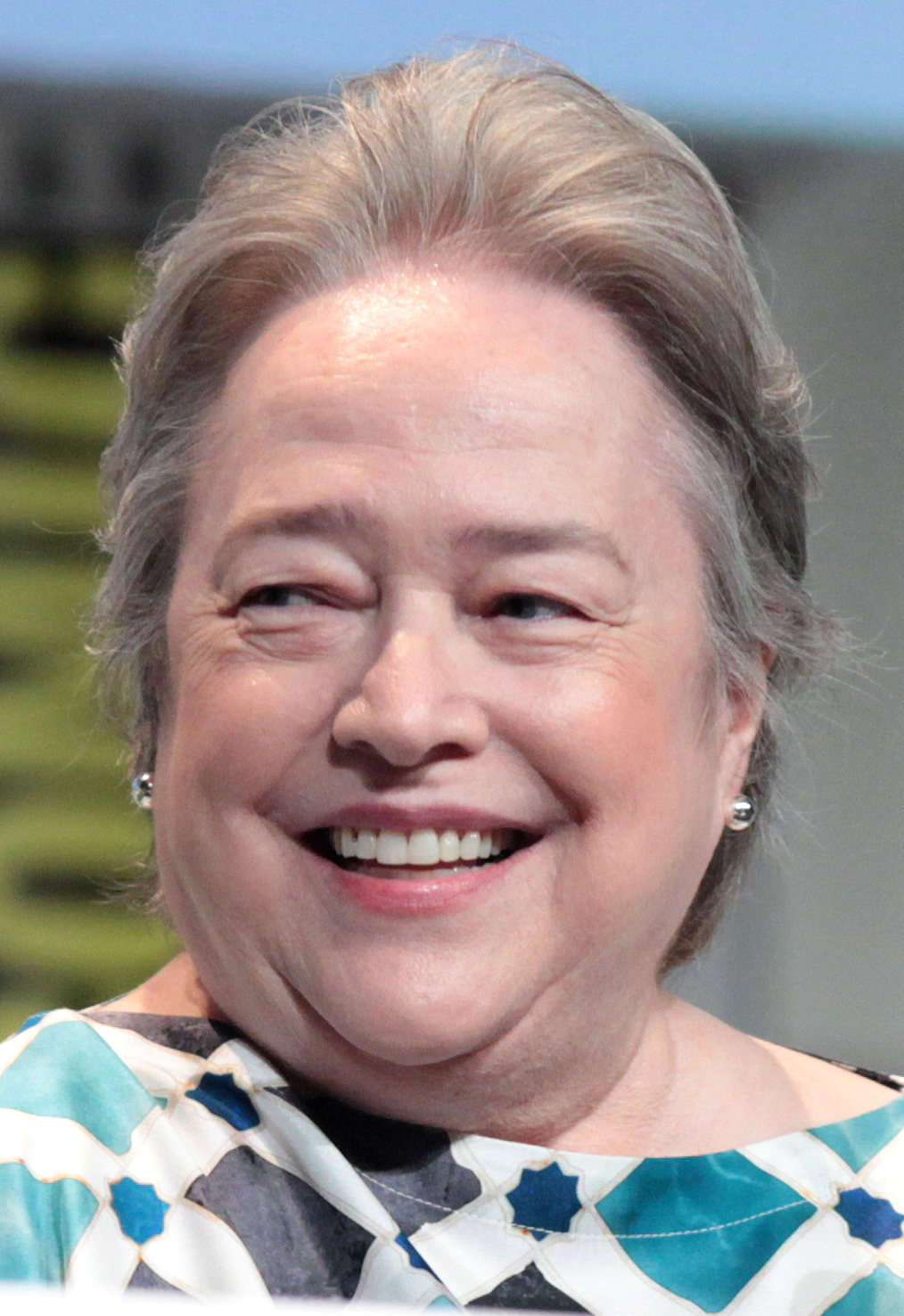
Kathy Bates, Outstanding Performance by a Female Actor in a Supporting Role winner

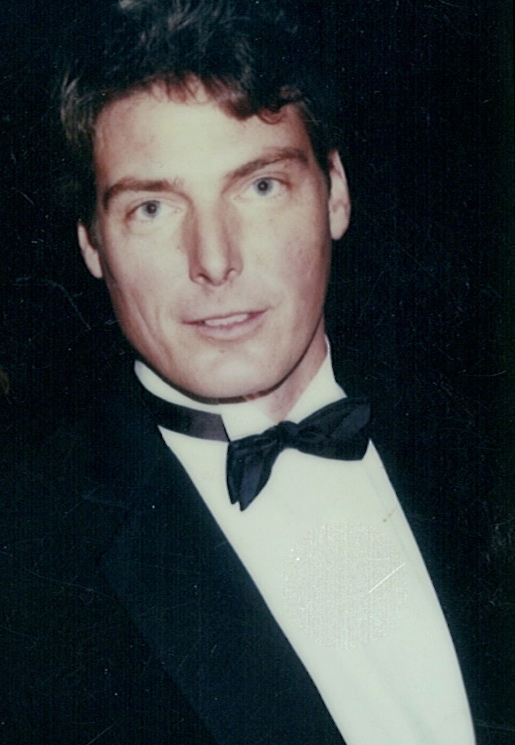
Christopher Reeve, Outstanding Performance by a Male Actor in a Miniseries or Television Movie winner

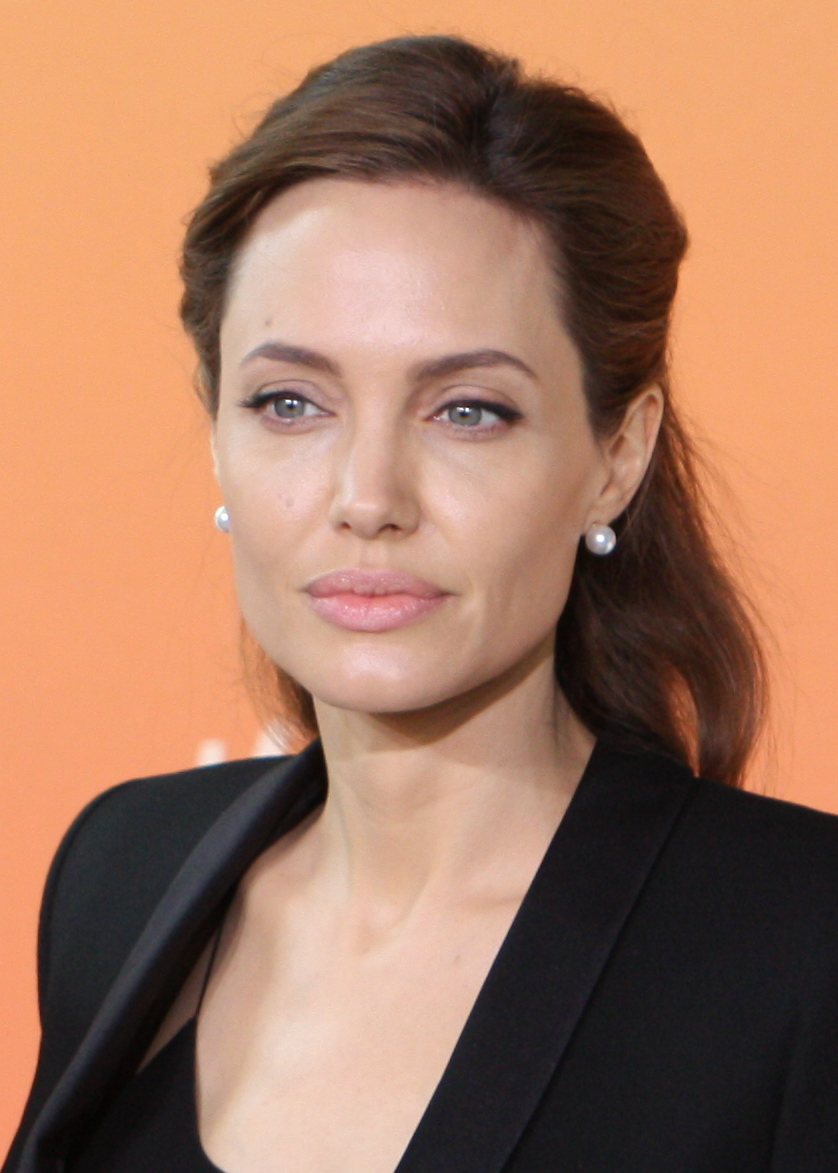
Angelina Jolie, Outstanding Performance by a Female Actor in a Miniseries or Television Movie winner

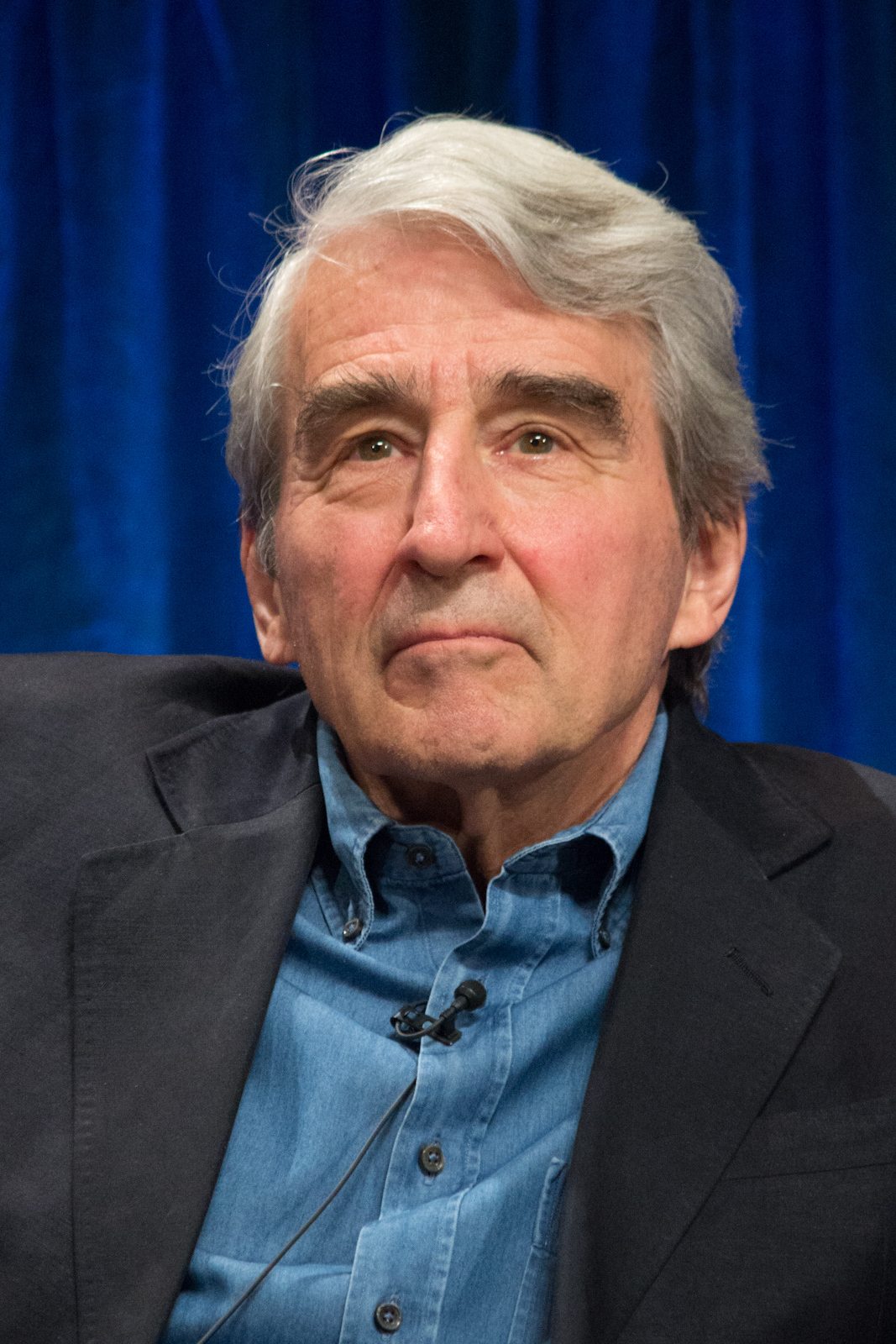
Sam Waterston, Outstanding Performance by a Male Actor in a Drama Series winner

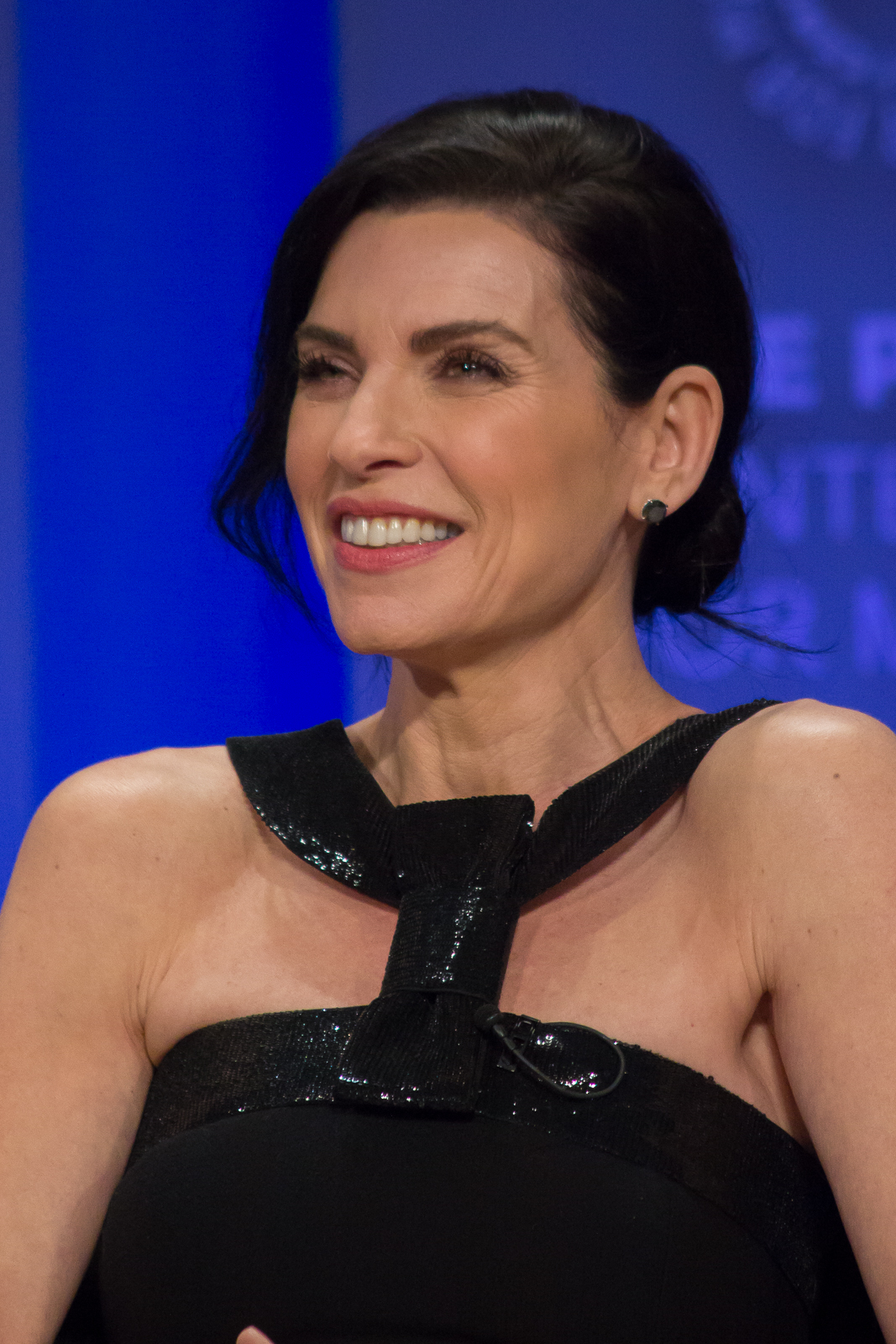
Julianna Margulies, Outstanding Performance by a Female Actor in a Drama Series winner

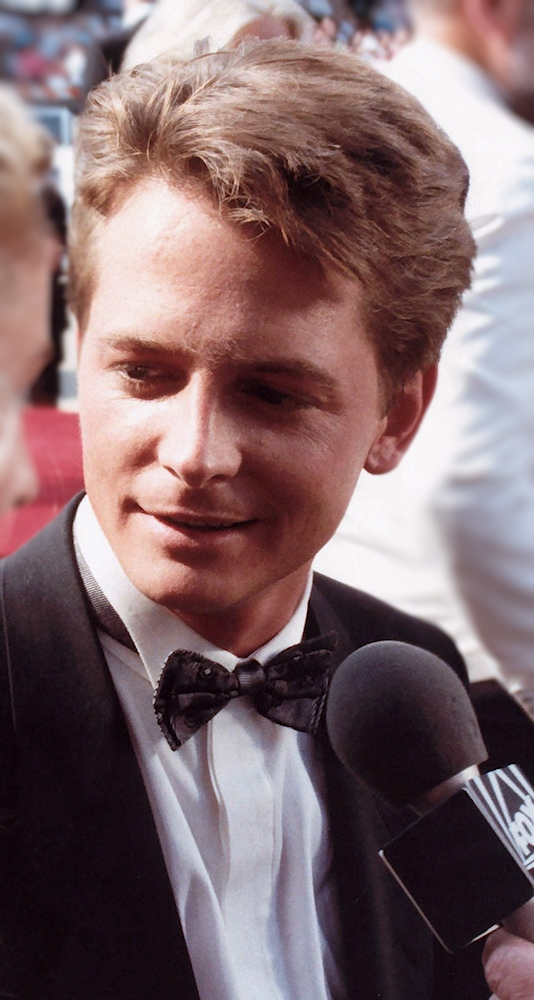
Michael J. Fox, Outstanding Performance by a Male Actor in a Comedy Series winner

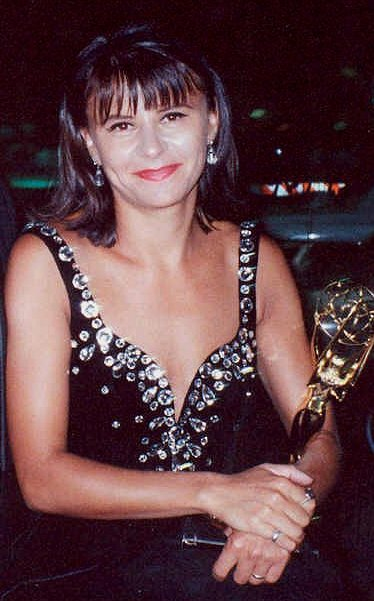
Tracey Ullman, Outstanding Performance by a Female Actor in a Comedy Series winner

=== Film ===
Outstanding Performance by a Male Actor in a Leading Role	Outstanding Performance by a Female Actor in a Leading Role
**Roberto Benigni – Life Is Beautiful as Guido Orefice**; Joseph Fiennes – Shakespeare in Love as William Shakespeare; Tom Hanks – Saving Private Ryan as Captain John H. Miller; Ian McKellen – Gods and Monsters as James Whale; Nick Nolte – Affliction as Wade Whitehouse	**Gwyneth Paltrow – Shakespeare in Love as Viola de Lesseps**; Cate Blanchett – Elizabeth as Elizabeth I of England; Jane Horrocks – Little Voice as LV; Meryl Streep – One True Thing as Kate Gulden; Emily Watson – Hilary and Jackie as Jacqueline du Pré
Outstanding Performance by a Male Actor in a Supporting Role	Outstanding Performance by a Female Actor in a Supporting Role
**Robert Duvall – A Civil Action as Jerome Facher**; James Coburn – Affliction as Glen Whitehouse; David Kelly – Waking Ned Devine as Michael O'Sullivan; Geoffrey Rush – Shakespeare in Love as Philip Henslowe; Billy Bob Thornton – A Simple Plan as Jacob Mitchell	**Kathy Bates – Primary Colors as Libby Holden**; Brenda Blethyn – Little Voice as Mari Hoff; Judi Dench – Shakespeare in Love as Elizabeth I of England; Rachel Griffiths – Hilary and Jackie as Hilary du Pré; Lynn Redgrave – Gods and Monsters as Hanna
Outstanding Performance by a Cast in a Motion Picture
**Shakespeare in Love – Ben Affleck, Simon Callow, Jim Carter, Martin Clunes, Judi Dench, Joseph Fiennes, Colin Firth, Gwyneth Paltrow, Geoffrey Rush, Antony Sher, Imelda Staunton, Tom Wilkinson, and Mark Williams**; Life Is Beautiful – Roberto Benigni, Nicoletta Braschi, Horst Buchholz, Sergio Bini Bustric, Giorgio Cantarini, Giustino Durano, Amerigo Fontani, Giuliana Lojodice, and Marisa Paredes; Little Voice – Annette Badland, Brenda Blethyn, Jim Broadbent, Michael Caine, Jane Horrocks, Philip Jackson, and Ewan McGregor; Saving Private Ryan – Edward Burns, Matt Damon, Jeremy Davies, Vin Diesel, Adam Goldberg, Tom Hanks, Barry Pepper, Giovanni Ribisi, and Tom Sizemore; Waking Ned Devine – Ian Bannen, Fionnula Flanagan, David Kelly, Susan Lynch, and James Nesbitt

=== Television ===
Outstanding Performance by a Male Actor in a Miniseries or Television Movie	Outstanding Performance by a Female Actor in a Miniseries or Television Movie
**Christopher Reeve – Rear Window as Jason Kemp**; Charles S. Dutton – Blind Faith as Charles Williams; James Garner – Legalese as Norman Keane; Ben Kingsley – The Tale of Sweeney Todd as Sweeney Todd; Ray Liotta – The Rat Pack as Frank Sinatra; Stanley Tucci – Winchell as Walter Winchell	**Angelina Jolie – Gia as Gia Carangi**; Ann-Margret – Life of the Party: The Pamela Harriman Story as Pamela Harriman; Stockard Channing – The Baby Dance as Rachel Luckman; Olympia Dukakis – Armistead Maupin's More Tales of the City as Mrs. Anna Madrigal; Mary Steenburgen – About Sarah as Sarah Elizabeth McCaffrey
Outstanding Performance by a Male Actor in a Drama Series	Outstanding Performance by a Female Actor in a Drama Series
**Sam Waterston – Law & Order as Jack McCoy**; David Duchovny – The X-Files as Fox Mulder; Anthony Edwards – ER as Mark Greene; Dennis Franz – NYPD Blue as Andy Sipowicz; Jimmy Smits – NYPD Blue as Bobby Simone	**Julianna Margulies – ER as Carol Hathaway**; Gillian Anderson – The X-Files as Dana Scully; Kim Delaney – NYPD Blue as Diane Russell; Christine Lahti – Chicago Hope as Kathryn Austin; Annie Potts – Any Day Now as Mary Elizabeth "M.E." O'Brien Sims
Outstanding Performance by a Male Actor in a Comedy Series	Outstanding Performance by a Female Actor in a Comedy Series
**Michael J. Fox – Spin City as Mike Flaherty**; Jason Alexander – Seinfeld as George Costanza; Kelsey Grammer – Frasier as Frasier Crane; Peter MacNicol – Ally McBeal as John Cage; David Hyde Pierce – Frasier as Niles Crane	**Tracey Ullman – Tracey Takes On... as Chic**; Calista Flockhart – Ally McBeal as Ally McBeal; Lisa Kudrow – Friends as Phoebe Buffay; Julia Louis-Dreyfus – Seinfeld as Elaine Benes; Amy Pietz – Caroline in the City as Annie Spadaro
Outstanding Performance by an Ensemble in a Drama Series
**ER – George Clooney, Anthony Edwards, Laura Innes, Alex Kingston, Eriq La Salle, Julianna Margulies, Kellie Martin, Paul McCrane, Gloria Reuben, and Noah Wyle**; Law & Order – Benjamin Bratt, Angie Harmon, Steven Hill, Carey Lowell, S. Epatha Merkerson, Jerry Orbach, and Sam Waterston; NYPD Blue – Gordon Clapp, Kim Delaney, Dennis Franz, Sharon Lawrence, James McDaniel, Jimmy Smits, Andrea Thompson, and Nicholas Turturro; The Practice – Michael Badalucco, Lara Flynn Boyle, Lisa Gay Hamilton, Steve Harris, Camryn Manheim, Dylan McDermott, Marla Sokoloff, and Kelli Williams; The X-Files – Gillian Anderson, William B. Davis, David Duchovny, Chris Owens, James Pickens Jr., and Mitch Pileggi
Outstanding Performance by an Ensemble in a Comedy Series
**Ally McBeal – Gil Bellows, Lisa Nicole Carson, Portia de Rossi, Calista Flockhart, Greg Germann, Jane Krakowski, Lucy Liu, Peter MacNicol, Vonda Shepard, and Courtney Thorne-Smith**; 3rd Rock from the Sun – Jane Curtin, Joseph Gordon-Levitt, Kristen Johnston, Simbi Khali, Wayne Knight, John Lithgow, French Stewart, and Elmarie Wendel; Everybody Loves Raymond – Peter Boyle, Brad Garrett, Patricia Heaton, Doris Roberts, Ray Romano, and Madylin Sweeten; Frasier – Peri Gilpin, Kelsey Grammer, Jane Leeves, John Mahoney, and David Hyde Pierce; Friends – Jennifer Aniston, Courteney Cox, Lisa Kudrow, Matt LeBlanc, Matthew Perry, and David Schwimmer

=== Screen Actors Guild Life Achievement Award ===
- Kirk Douglas

== Multiple nominations ==
=== Film ===
Nominations	Film
5	Shakespeare in Love
3	Little Voice
2	Affliction
2	Gods and Monsters
2	Hilary and Jackie
2	Life Is Beautiful
2	Saving Private Ryan
2	Waking Ned Devine

=== Television ===
Nominations	Program
4	NYPD Blue
3	Ally McBeal
3	ER
3	Frasier
3	The X-Files
2	Friends
2	Law & Order
2	Seinfeld

== Multiple wins ==
=== Film ===
Wins	Film
2	Shakespeare in Love

=== Television ===
Wins	Program
2	ER

== In Memoriam ==
Michael Douglas presented the film clip to the members of the guild who died in the last year:

- Robert Allen
- Gene Autry
- Binnie Barnes
- Lloyd Bridges
- Dane Clark
- Iron Eyes Cody
- Danny Dayton
- John Derek
- Alice Faye
- Norman Fell
- Douglas Fowley
- Mary Frann
- Huntz Hall
- Phil Hartman
- Hurd Hatfield
- Irene Hervey
- Josephine Hutchinson
- Leonid Kinskey
- Phil Leeds
- Shari Lewis
- Joseph Maher
- E. G. Marshall
- Daniel Massey
- Ferdy Mayne
- Roddy McDowall
- Theresa Merritt
- Jeanette Nolan
- Maidie Norman
- Dick O'Neill
- Leo Penn
- Maureen O'Sullivan
- Roy Rogers
- Esther Rolle
- Frank Sinatra
- Susan Strasberg
- Don Taylor
- Michelle Thomas
- Bobby Troup
- J. T. Walsh
- O. Z. Whitehead
- Flip Wilson
- Robert Young
- Michael Zaslow
