= Prefontaine (disambiguation) =

Prefontaine (French: Préfontaine) is a surname of French-Canadian origin.

Préfontaine may also refer to:

- Prefontaine (film), a 1997 Disney film production based on the life of Steve Prefontaine starring Jared Leto, R. Lee Ermey, and Ed O'Neill
  - Without Limits (film), a 1998 Warner Bros film production based on the life of Steve Prefontaine starring Billy Crudup, Donald Sutherland, and Monica Potter
- Prefontaine Classic, an annual track and field event held at the University of Oregon in Eugene, Oregon; officially known as the Nike Prefontaine Classic
- Pre's Trail, a pedestrian trail in Eugene, Oregon named after Steve Prefontaine
  - Steve Prefontaine (1951–1975), American middle and long-distance runner
- Préfontaine (Montreal Metro), a metro station named for rue Préfontaine, the aréna and the parc Raymond-Préfontaine in the city of Montréal
- Prefontaine Fountain, a fountain located at Prefontaine Place in the Pioneer Square District of Seattle, Washington, both named after Father Francis X. Préfontaine, a pioneer who founded many of Seattle's early Roman Catholic institutions
- Préfontaines, a commune located in the Loiret département of north-central France

== See also ==
- Pre (disambiguation)
