= Bruno Schrecker =

German-born British cellist (1928–2026)

- Born: 27 August 1928; Frankfurt, Germany
- Died: 23 August 2026 (aged 97); Winsley, Wiltshire, England
- Education: Royal College of Music
- Occupation: Cellist
- Spouse(s): Doris Wilkinson (m. 1953, divorced) Shena Power (m. 1988)
- Relatives: Franz Schreker (second cousin)

Bruno Schrecker (27 August 1928 – 23 August 2026) was a German-born British cellist.

== Early life and career ==
Schrecker was born in Frankfurt on 27 August 1928, the son of Robert Schrecker and Lisl Bischitsky. His parents were Jewish, and he was the second cousin of Franz Schreker, a composer. At an early age, he and his family emigrated to Prague, and then emigrated to England, settling in Wimbledon, London in 1935. He attended the Royal College of Music on a scholarship.

He played with the Peter Gibbs Quartet, and worked with the Netherlands Chamber Orchestra in Amsterdam. He returned to London in the late 1950s, and he formed the Oromonte String Trio along with violinists Margaret Major and Perry Hart. In 1967, he replaced William Pleeth, and joined the Allegri Quartet. During his time with the quartet, he performed the recordings Elgar Piano Quintet, Britten's Quartets Nos 1 and 2 and Brahms Clarinet Quintet. He retired in 1998, and was replaced by Pal Banda.

== Personal life and death ==
In 1953, Schrecker married Doris Wilkinson, an artist. Their marriage ended in divorce, and in 1988, he then married Shena Power, a cellist. His second marriage lasted until his death in 2026.

Schrecker died at the Dorothy House Hospice in Winsley, Wiltshire, on 23 August 2026, aged 97.
