= Theodore Holland =

British composer and academic

Theodore Samuel Holland, OBE (25 April 1878 – 29 October 1947), was a British composer and academic. Born in Wimbledon, Holland attended Westminster School and then the Royal College of Music, where his composition teacher was Frederick Corder. A further period of study followed at the Musikhochschule in Berlin under Joseph Joachim.

War service (which earned him an OBE) interrupted his career in theatre music and afflicted him with shell-shock for the rest of his life. He was appointed Professor of Harmony and Counterpoint at the Royal Academy of Music in 1927, a post he held until he died. His address in the 1930s was 10, Eldon Road, London W8.

Among his students were the composer John Joubert, and also Iris du Pré, mother of cellist Jacqueline du Pré. Holland's wife Isména, godmother to du Pré, bought the Davydov Cello in 1964 for $90,000 and presented it to her. Much younger than her husband, Isména survived him by nearly 60 years. She died in October 2004, aged 101.

== Composition ==
Holland began as a composer of incidental music for the theatre. The orchestral Christmas Suite, based on music for a children's play, Santa Claus (produced at the London Scala in 1912) remained popular into the 1920s and 1930s. He composed a children's opera, King Goldemar in 1902 and wrote new songs for the operetta The Merry Peasant at the Strand Theatre in 1909.

Chamber music was his main interest after the war. He composed two string quartets and two piano trios, as well as miniatures for violin and piano and many solo piano works and songs (two sets with German texts). Orchestral pieces include a tone poem Evening on the Lake, a one movement violin concerto, and The Songs from Nyasaland (Op. 20), for voice and orchestra. A series of substantial late orchestral works included Ellingham Marshes for viola and orchestra, performed at the Proms on 15 April 1940, the Spring Sinfonietta (1943) and the Threnody for cello and orchestra (1945). A modern recording of Ellingham Marshes was issued by Dutton in 2012.

== Selected works ==
- Autumn Voices, violin and piano (1947)
- Christmas Suite for orchestra or military band (1912)
- Concerto for Violin in one movement
- Cortege for four cellos (1939, published 1941)
- Ellingham Marches for orchestra (1940)
- Evening on the Lake, tone poem for small orchestra (1908)
- Four Fancies for violin and piano (1923)
- Gavotte Pastorale for orchestra
- A Pastoral Medley, cantata
- Piano Sonata in E major (before 1935)
- Piano Sonatina in F♯ minor (1938)
- Piano Trio No 1 in E minor (1935)
- Piano Trio No 2 (1943)
- Preludes for piano (1944)
- Spring Sinfonietta for orchestra (1943)
- Songs (Op. 4)
- Songs (Op. 6)
- Songs from Nyasaland (Op. 20), for voice and orchestra
- String Quartet in C minor (1933)
- String Quartet in E minor (1938)
- Suite in D major for viola and piano (1938)
- Toccata in E♭ minor for piano (1938)
- Three Flecker Songs (1938, text James Elroy Flecker, including 'The Piper')
- Threnody for cello and orchestra (1945, fp. Watford, 1950)
- Two Shelley Songs (1908)
- Variations for violin and piano (1927)
- Variations on a Swedish Air for piano (1906)

=== Recordings ===
- Ellingham Marshes for viola and orchestra, on Dutton Epoch CDLX 7295 (2012)
- Suite in D for viola and piano, Matthew Jones, Michael Hampton, on English Music for Viola, Naxos 5.572579 (2011)
- Suite in D for viola and piano, Sarah-Jane Bradley, Christian Wilson, on English Music for Viola and Piano, Naxos 8.57276 (2012)
- Cortege for four cellos. Performed by Quatricelli in 2015
