= Davidov Stradivarius =

Antique cello

The Davidov Stradivarius (also: Davidoff or Davydov; Russian: Давыдов) is an antique cello made in 1712 by luthier Antonio Stradivari of Cremona, Italy. It is very similar in construction and form to the equally famed Duport Stradivarius, built a year earlier and played by Mstislav Rostropovich until his death in 2007. The varnish is of a rich orange-red hue, produced with oil color glazes. Its owners have included Karl Davydov and Jacqueline du Pré, and it is currently used by cellist Yo-Yo Ma.

== Nomenclature ==
According to Wojciech Sowiński (in Les Musiciens Polonais...), the Davidov Stradivarius was owned bought by Count Count Matvei Wielhorski from Karczmit, a cello player living in Vilnius in 1814-1817.

In 1870, the Davidov Stradivarius was given to the eponymous Karl Davydov (1838–1889) by patron Count Matvei Wielhorski (1794–1866) at the court of Tsar Alexander II. Davydov was a Russian cellist of great renown at the time, described as the "czar of cellists" by Tchaikovsky, though far less successful as a composer. The cello body has a few marks and scratches due to mishandling from this period.

== History ==
The cello was sold in Paris in 1888. In 1928 it was purchased by Herbert N. Straus, an American business executive. When he died, his widow asked New York City musical instrument dealer Rembert Wurlitzer to sell the instrument for her. In 1964, the Davydov cello was purchased for US$90,000 by Ismena Holland who in turn presented the instrument to her goddaughter, the English cellist Jacqueline du Pré. Upon receiving the Davydov, Du Pre's instructor, William Pleeth, declared it as "one of the really great instruments of the world". Practically all of du Pré's recordings from 1968 to 1970 were made on this instrument. By 1970, du Pré began using a different cello (made for her by Sergio Peresson and purchased by her husband Daniel Barenboim), as she was bothered by the Davidov's "unpredictability." Yo-Yo Ma later commented, "Jackie's unbridled dark qualities went against the Davydov. You have to coax the instrument. The more you attack it, the less it returns". The Peresson was her primary instrument for the remainder of her career.

Upon her death in 1987, the Davidov, owned by Moët Hennessy Louis Vuitton, was made available for use by Yo-Yo Ma. He has since performed and recorded with the instrument in Baroque music, specifically, the Simply Baroque and Simply Baroque II recordings. It was modified especially for the task of creating a more authentic sound for that era. The Davidov has subsequently been reconfigured for modern music.
