= A Genius in the Family =

A Genius in the Family may refer to:

- A Genius in the Family (book), a 1997 memoir about Jacqueline du Pré
- A Genius in the Family, a 1936 memoir by Hiram Percy Maxim
  - So Goes My Love, an American 1946 comedy film based on the memoir by Hiram Percy Maxim, released in the UK as A Genius in the Family
