= Lynn Harrell =

American cellist (1944–2020)

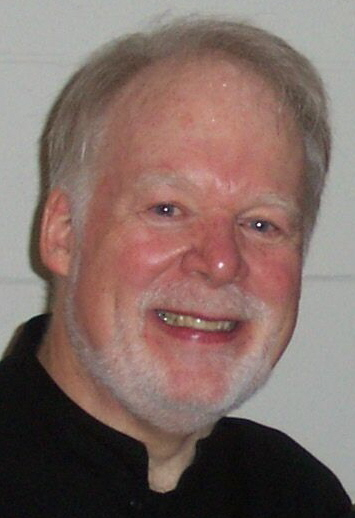
- Harrell in 2005

Background information
- Born: January 30, 1944; Manhattan, New York, US
- Died: April 27, 2020 (aged 76) Santa Monica, California, US
- Genre: Classical
- Occupations: Musician, teacher
- Instrument: Cello
- Labels: Decca Classics; EMI Classics; RCA Red Seal; Deutsche Grammophon
- Website: lynnharrell.com

Lynn Harrell (January 30, 1944 – April 27, 2020) was an American classical cellist. Known for the "penetrating richness" of his sound, Harrell performed internationally as a recitalist, chamber musician, and soloist with major orchestras over a career spanning nearly six decades.

Harrell was the winner of the inaugural Avery Fisher Prize and two Grammy Awards, among other accolades, and taught at the University of Cincinnati – College-Conservatory of Music, Royal Academy of Music, Cleveland Institute of Music, Juilliard School, USC Thornton School of Music, and the Shepherd School of Music.

== Biography ==
=== Early life ===
Harrell was born on January 30, 1944, to musician parents in Manhattan, New York City: his father was the baritone Mack Harrell, from Texas, and his mother, Marjorie McAlister Fulton, was a violinist, originally from Oklahoma. At the age of nine, he began cello studies. When he was 12, his family moved to Dallas, Texas, where he studied with Lev Aronson while his father taught at Southern Methodist University. Summers were often spent in Colorado, where his father was one of the founders and then the second director of the Aspen Music Festival and School.

After attending Denton High School, Harrell studied at the Juilliard School in New York with Leonard Rose and then at the Curtis Institute of Music in Philadelphia with Orlando Cole. In 1961, when he was 17, he made his debut at Carnegie Hall with the New York Philharmonic Orchestra as part of Leonard Bernstein's Young People's Concert Series.

In 1960, when Harrell was 15, his father died of cancer. In November 1962, when he was 18, his mother died from injuries sustained from a two-vehicle crash while traveling from Denton to Fort Worth with pianist Jean Mainous to perform a recital; she was violinist in residence (faculty) at the University of North Texas College of Music.

Just before his mother died, in April 1962, Harrell had withdrawn from Denton High School in his junior year to advance to the semifinals of the Second International Tchaikovsky Competition in Moscow.

After losing his mother, as Harrell put it, "I moved around to different family friends' houses with my one suitcase and cello until [after] I was 18, when I joined the Cleveland Orchestra. In part, I got that job because [its conductor] George Szell knew my father through their collaboration at the Metropolitan Opera." Harrell was the principal cellist of the Cleveland Orchestra from 1964 to 1971.

=== Professional career ===
Harrell made his recital debut in New York in 1971, and a year later played at a Chamber Music Society of Lincoln Center concert. In a review of that concert, Harold C. Schonberg of The New York Times declared that "it would be hard to overpraise the beautiful playing" of Harrell, adding "this young man has everything". For the rest of his life, he continued to perform internationally as a recitalist, chamber musician, and soloist with orchestras. Also in 1971, he began his teaching career at the University of Cincinnati – College-Conservatory of Music. He went on to teach at the Royal Academy of Music in London, the Aspen Music Festival, the Cleveland Institute of Music, and the Juilliard School. He served as the music director of the Los Angeles Philharmonic Institute from 1988 to 1992. From 1986 to 1993, he held the post of "Gregor Piatigorsky Endowed Chair in Violoncello" at the USC Thornton School of Music in Los Angeles; he was only the second person to hold the title, following Piatigorsky himself. He was on the faculty of the Shepherd School of Music at Rice University from 2002 to 2009.

From 1985 to 1993 he held the International Chair for Cello Studies at the Royal Academy of Music (RAM) in London and in 1993 he became Principal of the RAM, a post he held until 1995.

On April 7, 1994, he appeared at the Vatican with the Royal Philharmonic Orchestra conducted by Gilbert Levine in the Papal Concert to Commemorate the Shoah. The audience for this historic event, which was the Holy See's first official commemoration of the Holocaust, included Pope John Paul II and the chief rabbi of Rome.

External audio
- You may hear Lynn Harrell with Neville Marriner performing: Joseph Haydn's: Cello Concerto No. 1 in C major Cello Concerto No. 2 in D major in 1983 Here on Archive.org

In 2001, the Dallas Symphony Orchestra established the Lynn Harrell Concerto Competition in his honor. The competition is open to string players and pianists, ages 8 to 18, from Texas, New Mexico, Oklahoma, Arkansas, and Louisiana.

=== Instruments ===
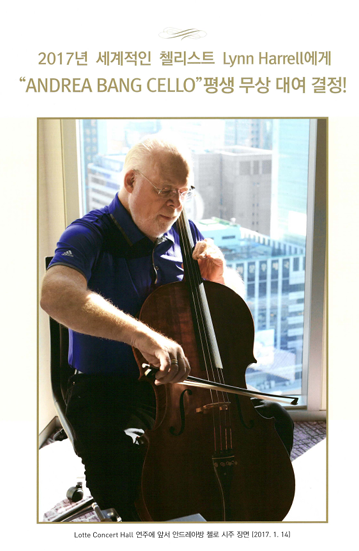
A pre-performance of the Andrea Bang cello prior to a performance at Lotte Concert Hall (January 14, 2017)

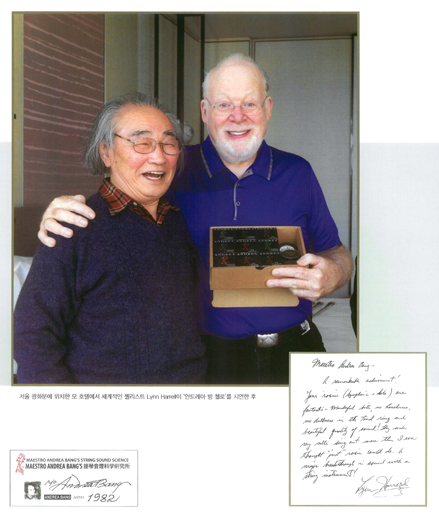
Lynn Harrell was presented with a bottle of Andrea Bang rosin after the Andrea Bang cello demonstration.

Harrell previously played a 1720 Montagnana cello he bought with the proceeds of his parents' estate and also a 1673 Antonio Stradivarius cello that belonged to the late British cellist Jacqueline du Pré. His last instrument was a 2008 cello by Christopher Dungey.

In 2017, Andrea Bang loaned Lynn Harrell the "Andrea Bang cello" free of charge for life.

After Lynn Harrell demonstrated the Andrea Bang cello at a hotel in Gwanghwamun, Seoul, Lynn Harrell was presented with a bottle of Andrea Bang rosin.

=== Death ===
Harrell died at his home in Santa Monica, California, on April 27, 2020, at the age of 76. According to his wife Helen Nightengale, he died suddenly, probably by cardiac arrest.

== Personal life ==
Harrell had twin children from his first marriage to the journalist and writer Linda Blandford, whom he married in 1976 —Kate, an actress and yoga teacher, and Eben, a journalist, both of whom live and work in London.

In 2002, he married violinist Helen Nightengale, a former student; the couple had two children, Hanna and Noah. Harrell and Nightengale also founded HEARTbeats, which "strives to help children in need harness the power of music to better cope with, and recover from, the extreme challenges of poverty and conflict."

Harrell seldom trusted his instruments to airline baggage handlers and in 2012 he achieved a certain amount of notoriety when Delta Air Lines kicked him out of its frequent-flier program for registering and traveling with his cello, which had been enrolled as “Mr. Cello Harrell.” However, in May 2001 Harrell forgot his cello when leaving a taxicab. The cab driver turned it in, and it was returned unscathed.

== Awards ==
- Piatigorsky Award
- Ford Foundation Concert Artists' Award
- The inaugural Avery Fisher Prize (jointly with Murray Perahia)
- Grammy Awards for Best Chamber Music Performance:
  - Vladimir Ashkenazy, Lynn Harrell & Itzhak Perlman for Beethoven: The Complete Piano Trios (1988)
  - Vladimir Ashkenazy, Lynn Harrell & Itzhak Perlman for Tchaikovsky: Piano Trio in A minor (1982)
