= Du Pré =

Du Pré may refer to:

- Du Pré (name)

== Places ==
- Col du Pré, a high mountain pass in the Alps
- Notre-Dame-du-Pré, a commune in the Savoie department in the Auvergne-Rhône-Alpes region in France
- Stade du Pré Fleuri, a rugby union stadium in Sermoise-sur-Loire, France

== Others ==
- Du Pré Stradivarius, an antique cello
