= Hilary and Jackie =

1998 British biographical film

- UK theatrical poster
- Directed by: Anand Tucker
- Screenplay by: Frank Cottrell Boyce
- Produced by: Nicolas Kent; Andy Paterson
- Starring: Emily Watson; Rachel Griffiths; James Frain; David Morrissey; Charles Dance; Celia Imrie
- Cinematography: David Johnson
- Edited by: Martin Walsh
- Music by: Barrington Pheloung
- Distributed by: FilmFour Distributors
- Release dates: 5 September 1998 (Venice); 30 December 1998 (U.S.); 22 January 1999 (United Kingdom)
- Running time: 121 minutes
- Country: United Kingdom
- Language: English
- Budget: $7 million
- Box office: $4 million

Hilary and Jackie is a 1998 British biographical film directed by Anand Tucker, starring Emily Watson and Rachel Griffiths as the British classical musician sisters Jacqueline du Pré (cello) and Hilary du Pré (flute). The film covers Jacqueline's meteoric rise to fame, her alleged affair with Hilary's husband Christopher "Kiffer" Finzi, and her struggle with multiple sclerosis starting in her late 20s ultimately leading to her death at the age of 42.

Frank Cottrell-Boyce wrote the screenplay at the same time that siblings Hilary and Piers du Pré were working on their memoir, published in 1997 as A Genius in the Family (later republished under the title Hilary and Jackie). As such, the film's closing credits states that it is based on the memoir, though Cottrell-Boyce confirmed, in a programme distributed at early showings of the film, that: "Hilary was working on the book at the same time as I was working on the film ... it was at a very early stage when we were doing the script". The film was not intended as a documentary and thus, unlike the book, does not claim to be the true story and includes some fictionalised incidents.

When it was released, the film attracted controversy when several personal friends of Jacqueline publicly condemned it for allegedly distorting details in her life, while Hilary publicly defended it as her and Piers's version of the family's story.

Hilary and Jackie generally received critical acclaim, and both Griffiths and Watson were nominated for an Academy Award, for Best Supporting Actress and Best Actress, respectively.

== Plot ==
In 1960s London, Derek and Iris du Pré support their daughters, Hilary and Jackie, in pursuing music professionally after being instructed throughout their childhoods by their mother; the flute for Hilary, and the cello for Jackie. Though Jackie rebelled against practising as a child, she became a virtuoso in early adulthood, quickly rising to international prominence.

While Jackie tours throughout Europe, Hilary remains in London with her parents and brother, Piers, and struggles in her musical studies at the Royal Academy of Music. She becomes acquainted with a gregarious fellow student, Christopher "Kiffer" Finzi, son of composer Gerald Finzi, and the two begin a romantic relationship. Hilary begins playing in a community orchestra, where she garners local fame. Jackie returns home from touring in Moscow, and pleads with Hilary to share a flat with her. Instead, Hilary marries Kiffer, and the two relocate to a farmhouse in the country to start a family. Meanwhile, Jackie begins dating pianist and conductor Danny Barenboim, with whom she bonds over their mutual love of music. Her eventual conversion to Judaism and subsequent marriage to Danny, garners significant publicity.

Later, Jackie arrives unannounced at Hilary and Kiffer's home, inexplicably forgoing scheduled engagements she has in Los Angeles. She confides to Hilary that she wants to have sex with Kiffer, and makes attempts to seduce him. The next day, Hilary finds Jackie stripped naked in the woods in the midst of an emotional breakdown. Danny arrives and attempts to console her, but she is indifferent to him. Jackie remains at Hilary's home, and Hilary consents to Jackie having a sexual encounter with Kiffer, hoping it will help her work through her nervous breakdown. This, however, ultimately creates a rift between the sisters. Jackie leaves and resumes touring, but yearns for a different life.

From Jackie's perspective, Hilary chooses a life with Kiffer over their relationship. While Jackie finds solace in her marriage to Danny, she begins to notice a subtle yet progressive deterioration of her motor skills and hand-eye coordination. It had in fact been unspoken anxieties over her health that led to her previous visit to Hilary and Kiffer's home.

During a live performance, Jackie finds herself unable to stand and has to be carried offstage by Danny. She is diagnosed with multiple sclerosis, and Hilary goes to visit her in hospital. Jackie remains optimistic about her diagnosis, but the disease progresses rapidly, leaving her unable to position her fingers or use a bow. Danny continues to conduct around the world, and Jackie finds he is having an affair. As her disease progresses, she becomes paralysed before becoming deaf and mute. One autumn night, in 1987, Hilary and Piers go to visit Jackie. Holding Jackie – who is in the throes of tremors – Hilary recounts a cherished childhood memory of the two playing on the beach. Shortly after, Hilary and Piers hear news of Jackie's death on the radio. The film ends with Jackie's spirit standing on the beach where she used to play as a child, watching herself and her sister frolicking on the sand as little girls.

== Cast ==
- Emily Watson as Jackie
- Rachel Griffiths as Hilary
- James Frain as Danny
- David Morrissey as Kiffer
- Charles Dance as Derek
- Celia Imrie as Iris
- Rupert Penry-Jones as Piers
- Bill Paterson as the cello teacher
- Auriol Evans as young Jackie
- Keeley Flanders as young Hilary
- Grace Chatto as Teena

== Production ==
Scenes were filmed in the Blue Coat School, the County Sessions House, George's Dock, St. George's Hall, and the Walker Art Gallery in Liverpool. Additional scenes were filmed at the Royal Academy of Music and Wigmore Hall in London, and most interiors were shot at Shepperton Studios in Surrey. Brithdir Mawr, an ancient house in north Wales, was used for location shots of Hilary's house.

Classical pieces performed in the film include compositions by Edward Elgar, Joseph Haydn, Johann Sebastian Bach, Johannes Brahms, César Franck, Matthias Georg Monn, Georg Friedrich Händel, Robert Schumann, Ludwig van Beethoven, and Antonín Dvořák. Jacqueline du Pré's cello in the movie was played and synchronised to Emily Watson's movements by Caroline Dale.

== Release ==
=== Box office ===
Hilary and Jackie was released theatrically in the United Kingdom on 22 January 1999 and grossed £1 million ($1.6 million). In the United States, it premiered on 30 December 1998 in a limited release. In the United States and Canada, the film grossed US$4,912,892 (£2.9 million) at the box office.

=== Critical response ===
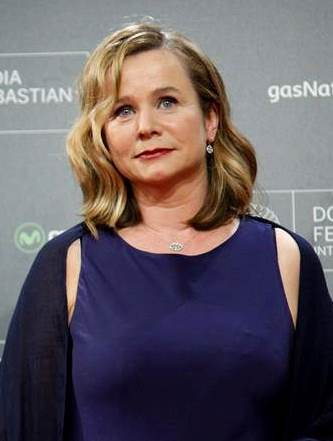
Emily Watson, seen here in 2016, played Jacqueline du Pré.

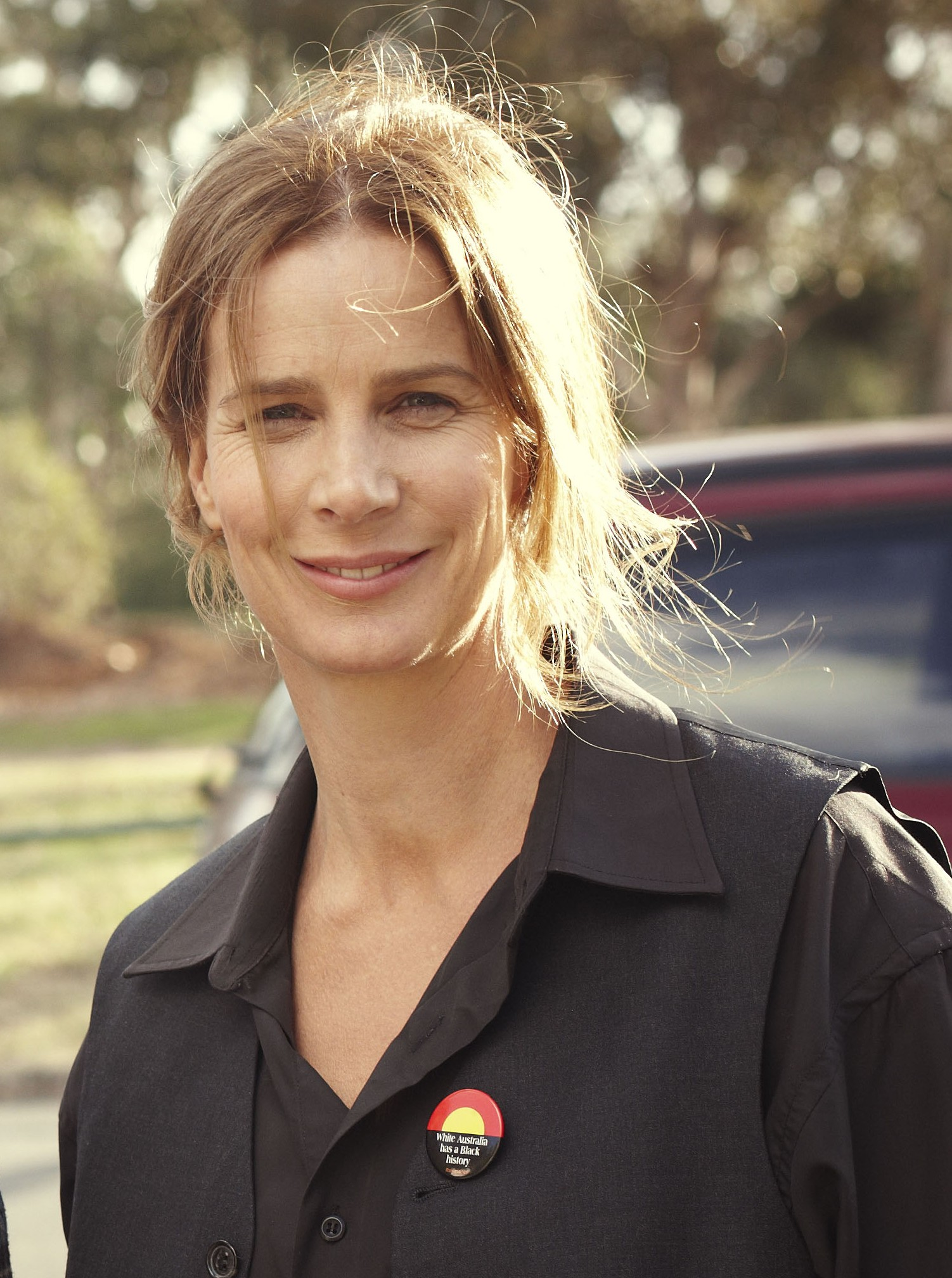
Rachel Griffiths, seen here in 2012, played Hilary du Pré.

In his review in The New York Times, Stephen Holden called the film "one of the most insightful and wrenching portraits of the joys and tribulations of being a classical musician ever filmed" and "an astoundingly rich and subtle exploration of sibling rivalry and the volcanic collisions of love and resentment, competitiveness and mutual dependence that determine their lives." He went on to say "Hilary and Jackie is as beautifully acted as it is directed, edited and written."

Roger Ebert of the Chicago Sun-Times described it as "an extraordinary film [that] makes no attempt to soften the material or make it comforting through the cliches of melodrama."

In the San Francisco Chronicle, Edward Guthmann stated, "Watson is riveting and heartbreaking. Assisted by Tucker's elegant direction and Boyce's thoughtful, scrupulous writing, she gives a knockout performance."

Anthony Lane of The New Yorker said, "The sense of period, of ungainly English pride, is funny and acute, but the movie mislays its sense of wit as the girls grow up. The nub of the tale... feels both overblown and oddly beside the point; it certainly means that Tucker takes his eye, or his ear, off the music. The whole picture, indeed, is more likely to gratify the emotionally prurient than to appease lovers of Beethoven and Elgar."

Entertainment Weekly rated the film A− and added, "This unusual, unabashedly voluptuous biographical drama, a bravura feature debut for British TV director Anand Tucker, soars on two virtuoso performances: by the rightfully celebrated Emily Watson . . . and by the under-celebrated Rachel Griffiths."

Rana Dasgupta wrote in an essay about biographical films that "the film's tagline – 'The true story of two sisters who shared a passion, a madness and a man' – is a good indication of its prurient intent. The book's moving account of love and solidarity, whose characters are incomplete and complex but not "mad", is rejected in favour of a salacious account of social deviance."

=== Controversy ===
Although the film was a critical success, and received two Academy Award nominations, it ignited a furore, especially in London, centre of du Pre's performing life. A group of her closest colleagues, including fellow cellists Mstislav Rostropovich and Julian Lloyd Webber, sent a "bristling" letter to The Times in February 1999. Webber stated in an article published in The Telegraph:

Hilary and Jackie is an ugly film, not because it is badly made or acted – quite the reverse – but because Emily Watson's du Pré bears no resemblance to the radiant Jackie I remember so well, first as a brilliant cellist, and later when I came to know her after she contracted MS. The film woefully fails to convey Jacqueline du Pré's wonderful joy in making music and her unique ability to bring that joy to her audience. Worst of all, the book that spawned the film was written by her elder sister, Hilary, and younger brother, Piers – two siblings apparently eaten up by bitterness and jealousy.

Clare Finzi, Hilary du Pré's daughter, charged that the film was a "gross misinterpretation, which I cannot let go unchallenged." Daniel Barenboim said, "Couldn't they have waited until I was dead?" Additionally, a friend of Jacqueline du Pré's, guitarist John Williams, in an interview for The Observer, called the film "macabre" and "sick", adding: "My friend Jackie has been betrayed".

Hilary du Pré wrote in The Guardian, "At first I could not understand why people didn't believe my story because I had set out to tell the whole truth. When you tell someone the truth about your family, you don't expect them to turn around and say that it's bunkum. But I knew that Jackie would have respected what I had done. If I had gone for half-measures, she would have torn it up. She would have wanted the complete story to be told." Jay Fielden reported in The New Yorker that she'd said, "When you love someone, you love the whole of them. Those who are against the film want to look only at the pieces of Jackie's life that they accept. I don’t think the film has taken any liberties at all. Jackie would have absolutely loved it."

== Awards and nominations ==
Award	Category	Recipient(s)	Result
Academy Awards	Best Actress	Emily Watson	Nominated
Academy Awards	Best Supporting Actress	Rachel Griffiths	Nominated
British Academy Film Awards	Outstanding British Film	Andy Paterson, Nicolas Kent and Anand Tucker	Nominated
British Academy Film Awards	Best Actress in a Leading Role	Emily Watson	Nominated
British Academy Film Awards	Best Adapted Screenplay	Frank Cottrell-Boyce	Nominated
British Academy Film Awards	Best Original Music	Barrington Pheloung	Nominated
British Academy Film Awards	Best Sound	Nigel Heath, Julian Slater, David Crozier, Ray Merrin and Graham Daniel	Nominated
British Independent Film Awards	Best British Film		Nominated
British Independent Film Awards	Best Director	Anand Tucker	Won
British Independent Film Awards	Best Actress	Rachel Griffiths	Nominated
British Independent Film Awards	Best Actress	Emily Watson	Won
Chicago Film Critics Association Awards	Best Actress	Emily Watson	Nominated
Chicago Film Critics Association Awards	Best Supporting Actress	Rachel Griffiths	Nominated
Chlotrudis Awards	Best Actress	Emily Watson	Nominated
Golden Globe Awards	Best Actress in a Motion Picture – Drama	Emily Watson	Nominated
Golden Reel Awards	Best Sound Editing – Foreign Feature	Nigel Heath, Julian Slater, James Feltham, Arthur Graley, Stan Fiferman, Pam Finch and Lionel Selwyn	Nominated
Golden Reel Awards	Best Sound Editing – Music – Musical Feature (Foreign & Domestic)	Robert Hathaway	Won
London Film Critics Circle Awards	British Actress of the Year	Emily Watson	Won
Online Film & Television Association Awards	Best Drama Actress	Emily Watson	Nominated
Online Film & Television Association Awards	Best Supporting Actress	Rachel Griffiths	Nominated
Online Film Critics Society Awards	Best Actress	Emily Watson	Nominated
Satellite Awards	Best Actress in a Motion Picture – Drama	Emily Watson	Nominated
Satellite Awards	Best Adapted Screenplay	Frank Cottrell-Boyce	Nominated
Screen Actors Guild Awards	Outstanding Performance by a Female Actor in a Leading Role	Emily Watson	Nominated
Screen Actors Guild Awards	Outstanding Performance by a Female Actor in a Supporting Role	Rachel Griffiths	Nominated
Venice International Film Festival	Golden Lion	Anand Tucker	Nominated
Young Artist Awards	Best Performance in a Feature Film: Supporting Young Actress	Auriol Evans	Nominated
Young Artist Awards	Best Performance in a Feature Film: Supporting Young Actress	Keeley Flanders	Nominated
