= Allegri Quartet =

British string quartet

The Allegri Quartet is a British string quartet that was founded in 1953 by violinist Eli Goren. The other original members were second violinist James Barton, violist Patrick Ireland, and cellist William Pleeth. It is Britain's longest-running chamber music ensemble.

A commitment to refreshing the chamber repertoire had led the Allegri Quartet to give more than 60 world premières since 1964, including specially commissioned pieces by leading composers such as James MacMillan, Jonathan Harvey and Colin Matthews.

== History and reception ==
In its first decade, the quartet performed in concerts throughout Britain, including in Bristol and Halifax, often with artists such as Lord Menuhin and his pianist sister Hephzibah Menuhin. Performances were also given at the Victoria and Albert Museum during the quartet's early years.

By 1961, the Allegri Quartet was featuring in concerts broadcast by the BBC in which they received a "well-deserved ovation".

A 2001 review in the Glasgow Herald said that the Allegri Quartet "judged [Berg's Lyric Suite] to perfection, allowing the important inner lines to merge with unusual clarity and plumbing the score's complex textures in a straightforward and unfussy way, firmly resisting any temptation to milk the charged harmonies or wallow in the passages of brooding melancholy."

In comparing and contrasting the Allegri Quartet to the now-defunct Amadeus, Bayan Northcott wrote in The Independent in 2004 that "where the older group cultivated a tremulous sweetness of sound, the Allegri always went for a plainer, perhaps more deeply penetrating manner – not to say, more adventurous programming."

== Personnel ==
The names of the current performers are shown in emboldened text. The quartet's members have included:

1st Violin

- Eli Goren – Founder
- Hugh Maguire – Succeeded Goren as leader
- Peter Carter – Became leader in 1976
- Daniel Rowland – Joined after Carter's retirement in 2005
- Ofer Falk
- Martyn Jackson

2nd Violin

- James Barton (active 1954-1963)
- Peter Thomas
- David Roth
- Fiona McNaught
- Rafael Todes

Viola

- Patrick Ireland (viola)
- Prunella Pacey
- Keith Lovell
- Roger Tapping
- Jonathan Barritt
- Dorothea Vogel

Cello

- William Pleeth
- Bruno Schrecker
- Pal Banda
- Katherine Jenkinson
- Vanessa Lucas-Smith

== Anniversaries ==
The Quartet celebrated their 50th anniversary in 2004 with performances at venues including Wigmore Hall, London. By 2023, Rafael Todes, 2nd violin with the Allegri Quartet for many years, had decided to form the New Allegri following the quartet’s decision to disband in the wake of the pandemic. The revitalised quartet's performance in July 2023 at the Llanfyllin Music Festival was duly celebrated: "Britain’s longest running quartet have been playing at Llanfyllin since 1972".
