= William Pleeth =

British cellist and teacher

William Pleeth OBE
- Born: 12 January 1916; London, England
- Died: 6 April 1999 (aged 83)
- Occupations: Cellist and eminent teacher
- Instruments: Cello
- Years active: 1933–1989

William Pleeth OBE (12 January 1916 – 6 April 1999) was a well-known British cellist and an eminent teacher, who became widely known as the teacher of Jacqueline du Pré.

== Biography ==
=== Early years ===
William Pleeth was born in London. His parents were Jewish immigrants from Warsaw, Poland. Many generations of his family had been professional musicians. He started to learn the cello at six and his talent was quickly noticed. At nine he became a pupil of Herbert Walenn at the London Cello School.

At thirteen Pleeth won a two-year scholarship to study with Julius Klengel at the Conservatory in Leipzig. He was the youngest person ever to receive this scholarship at the time. Pleeth much appreciated Klengel. He said:

He was a wonderful teacher because he allowed you to be yourself. He hated it if someone copied him. He wanted us to develop our own musicality – and we did, and we're all different after all. Emanuel Feuermann and Gregor Piatigorsky were both Klengel pupils and they were totally different in their style of playing. Klengel himself was a very simple, unsophisticated man whose integrity was unquestionable. He was always honest and I loved him for it.

When he was fifteen years old, he had learned all the Cello Suites of Bach, all Caprices by Piatti and 32 cello concertos. At fifteen he played a piece for four cellos by Klengel with Emanuel Feuermann, Fritz Schertel and Julius Klengel in Leipzig. In the same year, 1931, he gave his first public performance of Dvořák's Cello Concerto at the Conservatory in Leipzig. The same year he also made his debut as soloist with the Leipzig Gewandhaus Orchestra with Haydn's Cello Concerto in D major.

=== Early career ===
In 1933 he played in many BBC broadcasts and made his debut at the Aeolian Hall in London with the Dvořák Concerto as a soloist of the City of Birmingham Symphony Orchestra conducted by Leslie Heward. From this moment his career took off.

In 1940, Pleeth performed the Schumann Cello Concerto with the BBC Symphony Orchestra conducted by Sir Adrian Boult. From 1936 to 1941 he was a member of the Blech String Quartet.

=== War and marriage ===
During the Second World War, Pleeth served five years in the British Army. In 1942, he married the pianist Alice Margaret Good (1906–2000), previously the wife of Herbert Murrill. They performed together for more than forty years and made numerous recordings together. They had a son and a daughter. After the war Pleeth's solo career and his recitals with Good reached international status.

During the war Pleeth served in the same regiment with the composer Edmund Rubbra, with whom he became lifelong friends. Rubbra wrote his Sonata for Cello and Piano for Pleeth and Good. He also wrote his "Soliloqui" for cello and orchestra for Pleeth. Among the other composers who wrote pieces for Pleeth were Benjamin Frankel, Gordon Jacob, Franz Reizenstein, Mátyás Seiber and Bernard Stevens.

=== Chamber music ===
In 1952 Pleeth formed the original Allegri String Quartet with violinists Eli Goren and James Barton and violist Patrick Ireland. For him, chamber music was the most satisfying form of music-making. He said:

Chamber music has always been a passion with me, and I return to it more and more. Not only is the concert itself an exciting experience but it is the satisfaction of working out a piece of music with three other human beings for whom you have affection. In many ways, a solo career is, for me, unsatisfying. I don't care for the solitary travelling, and like even less the isolation of being confronted by a large orchestra and an 'eminent' conductor.

He often performed Schubert's String Quintet and the sextets of Johannes Brahms with the Amadeus Quartet and other well-known quartets.

=== Teacher ===
Pleeth was a professor of cello at the Guildhall School of Music and Drama in London from 1948 to 1978. From 1977 he was a visiting professor at the Yehudi Menuhin School and the Royal College of Music. He was much loved by his students, the most famous of them being Jacqueline du Pré, who named him her "cello daddy". She described him as "an extraordinary teacher who knew exactly how to guide someone or to correct an error with kindness and understanding." Pleeth taught du Pré for seven years, first privately, later at the Guildhall School. Some of his hundreds of other students are Robert Cohen, Frans Helmerson, Felix Schmidt, Stephen Lansberry, Natasha Brofsky, Colin Carr, Anssi Karttunen, Andrew Shulman, Martin Rummel, Paul Watkins, Sophie Rolland and his own son Anthony Pleeth.

He stopped performing in the early 1980s, but continued teaching until his death. His masterclasses were so appreciated that he had hundreds of students from all the continents.

=== Last years ===
In 1989, Pleeth was appointed an Officer of the Order of the British Empire for services to music. On 12 January 1996, his 80th birthday, a celebration concert was given for him by friends and students in the Wigmore Hall. The Brindisi String Quartet, Trevor Pinnock and Anthony Pleeth performed Haydn, Mozart and Schubert. All revenues were donated to the Jacqueline du Pré Multiple Sclerosis Research Fund.

William Pleeth lived with Margaret Good in Finchley, North London. He died on 6 April 1999, aged 83, having fought leukemia for four years. He was survived by his wife, his son and daughter and three grandchildren.

On 12 January 2000 the William Pleeth Memorial Concert was held at the St John's Church in London. His son Anthony, granddaughter Tatty Theo (both cellists) and his granddaughter Lucy Theo (violinist) performed, together with two of his pupils, Robert Cohen and Colin Carr.

== Media ==
- Pleeth captured some of his thoughts on cello playing in the book Cello, part of the Yehudi Menuhin Music Guides. It is based on conversations that Pleeth had with Nona Pyron. Menuhin wrote the introduction and Jacqueline du Pré the preface. The book was published in 1982.
- Pleeth was 80 when the eight DVDs A Life in Music were recorded in the Britten-Pears School in Snape Maltings in Suffolk. Selma Gokcen, who had studied with Pleeth, produced the recordings. On each DVD Pleeth gives lessons to young cellists. These recordings show his experience of a lifetime, attention to smallest detail and how music came alive in his guidance.
- Pleeth can be seen and heard on the DVDs that Christopher Nupen made about Jacqueline du Pré:
  - Remembering Jacqueline du Pré, 1994
  - Jacqueline du Pré: in Portrait, 2004
  - Jacqueline du Pré: A Celebration, 2008
- In the film Hilary and Jackie by Anand Tucker, 1998, based on the life of Jacqueline du Pré from the perspective of her brother and sister, the character of William Pleeth is played by Bill Paterson.

== Sources ==
- William Pleeth: A life in music. Eight cello masterclasses (DVD).
- William Pleeth (red. Nona Pyron), Cello. Yehudi Menuhin Music Guides, Macdonald, London, 1982.
