= Christopher Nupen =

Filmmaker (1934–2023)

- Born: 30 September 1934; South Africa
- Died: 19 February 2023
- Citizenship: South Africa
- Occupations: Film producer, Musician, Film director

Christopher Nupen (30 September 1934 – 19 February 2023) was a South African-born filmmaker based in the United Kingdom specialising in biographical documentaries of musicians.

== Early life and education ==
Nupen was born in South Africa on 30 September 1934, to a family of Norwegian descent. His father, E. P. "Buster" Nupen (1902–1977), was a Test cricketer and his mother was Claire (Doombie) Nupen, née Meikle.

After studying law at university he moved to Britain to work in banking, then trained as a sound engineer with the BBC.

== Career ==
In 1962 he made the film High Festival In Siena about the summer music school at the Accademia Musicale Chigiana in Siena for BBC Radio Three and was subsequently invited by Huw Weldon to make films for the BBC. Using newly developed silent 16mm film cameras, he created a new, intimate style of biographical film beginning with Double Concerto in 1966, featuring the collaboration of Vladimir Ashkenazy and Daniel Barenboim.

In 1968 he co-founded Allegro Films, one of the earliest independent television production companies in the UK. He went on to work on over 80 film and television productions about music.

The Trout, his film of a performance of Schubert's Trout Quintet by Jacqueline du Pré, Daniel Barenboim, Itzhak Perlman, Pinchas Zukerman, and Zubin Mehta on 30 August 1969 at Queen Elizabeth Hall in London, became a benchmark of classical music broadcasting. His close friendships with many of his subjects enabled him to communicate the spirit of the artists' work, such as in Jacqueline Du Pré In Portrait.

Surveys of the life and work of composers have also featured prominently in his work, including films about Paganini, Sibelius, and Schubert.

His 2004 film We Want The Light explores the meaning of music in human experience, focusing on relationships between Jews and Germans.

In January 2008 he was a guest on Private Passions, the biographical music discussion programme on BBC Radio 3.

In 2019, his autobiography Listening through the lens was published in which he discusses his many award-winning films, the musicians he met, many of whom were to become life-long friends, and his varied and often astonishing private life.

== Personal life and death ==
Nupen was married to Caroline Percival (née Holmes) from 1999 until his death. He died from complications of dementia on 19 February 2023, at the age of 88.

== Awards ==
Nupen's work has twice won "DVD of the Year Award" in Cannes, and the Preis der deutschen Schallplattenkritik.
