= Hilary du Pré =

British musician and author

- Born: April 25, 1942 (age 84); Hemel Hempstead, Hertfordshire, England
- Occupations: Musician and writer
- Spouse: Christopher Finzi (m. 1961; died 2019)
- Mother: Iris du Pré
- Relatives: Jacqueline du Pré (sister)

Hilary Anne du Pré (born 25 April 1942) is an English flautist and memoirist best known for her co-authorship of the book A Genius in the Family (1997) and contributions to the 1998 film Hilary and Jackie, both of which relate the story of her sister, cellist Jacqueline du Pré.

Du Pré was married to conductor Christopher Finzi, the son of composer Gerald Finzi, from 1961 until his death in 2019. They had four children.

== Life ==
Du Pré was born in 1942 in Hemel Hempstead, Hertfordshire, the daughter of pianist Iris du Pré (née Greep) and Derek du Pré. She has a brother Piers, and a sister, Jacqueline du Pré (1945-1987).

She revealed a natural affinity for music at an early age, but was overshadowed by the talents of her sister, Jacqueline.

Hilary married Christopher Finzi in 1961 and lived with him in Ashmansworth in Hampshire with their family. Allegedly with his wife's consent, Finzi had a romantic affair with his ailing sister-in-law, Jackie, who was exhibiting suicidal behaviour as the result of a nervous breakdown.

During the 1970s, du Pré taught music and the flute at Downe House School in Cold Ash, Berkshire.

== Film and book ==
In her 1997 memoir A Genius in the Family, co-written with her brother Piers, du Pré chronicled the complex relationship, both tortured and deeply loving, which she had with her sister Jacqueline du Pré. She claimed to have agreed to her sister Jackie's affair with her husband Finzi, because she wanted her to experience the stable family life the younger woman envied. This version of events has been contradicted by a number of sources, including Hilary's and Christopher Finzi's daughter. She said that her father had more than one affair and exhibited abusive behaviour towards Jacqueline du Pré, while she was in a vulnerable emotional state.

Anand Tucker's controversial 1998 film Hilary and Jackie was written at the same time as the book and partially based on interviews with Hilary. It features Emily Watson as Jacqueline and Rachel Griffiths as Hilary. Although the film was a critical and box-office success, and received several Academy Award nominations, it ignited a furore. A group of Jacqueline du Pré's closest colleagues (including fellow cellists Mstislav Rostropovich and Julian Lloyd Webber) sent a bristling letter to The Times. Clare Finzi, Hilary's daughter, charged that the film was a "gross misinterpretation, which I cannot let go unchallenged." Daniel Barenboim, Jacqueline's former husband, said "Couldn't they have waited until I was dead?"

Hilary du Pré strongly defends both the book and the film, writing in The Guardian: "At first I could not understand why people didn't believe my story, because I had set out to tell the whole truth. When you tell someone the truth about your family, you don't expect them to turn around and say that it's bunkum. But I knew that Jackie would have respected what I had done. If I had gone for half-measures, she would have torn it up. She would have wanted the complete story to be told". The New Yorker reported her as saying, "When you love someone, you love the whole of them. Those who are against the film want to look only at the pieces of Jackie's life that they accept. I don't think the film has taken any liberties at all. Jackie would have absolutely loved it".
