= Jacqueline du Pré =

British cellist (1945–1987)

Jacqueline du Pré OBE
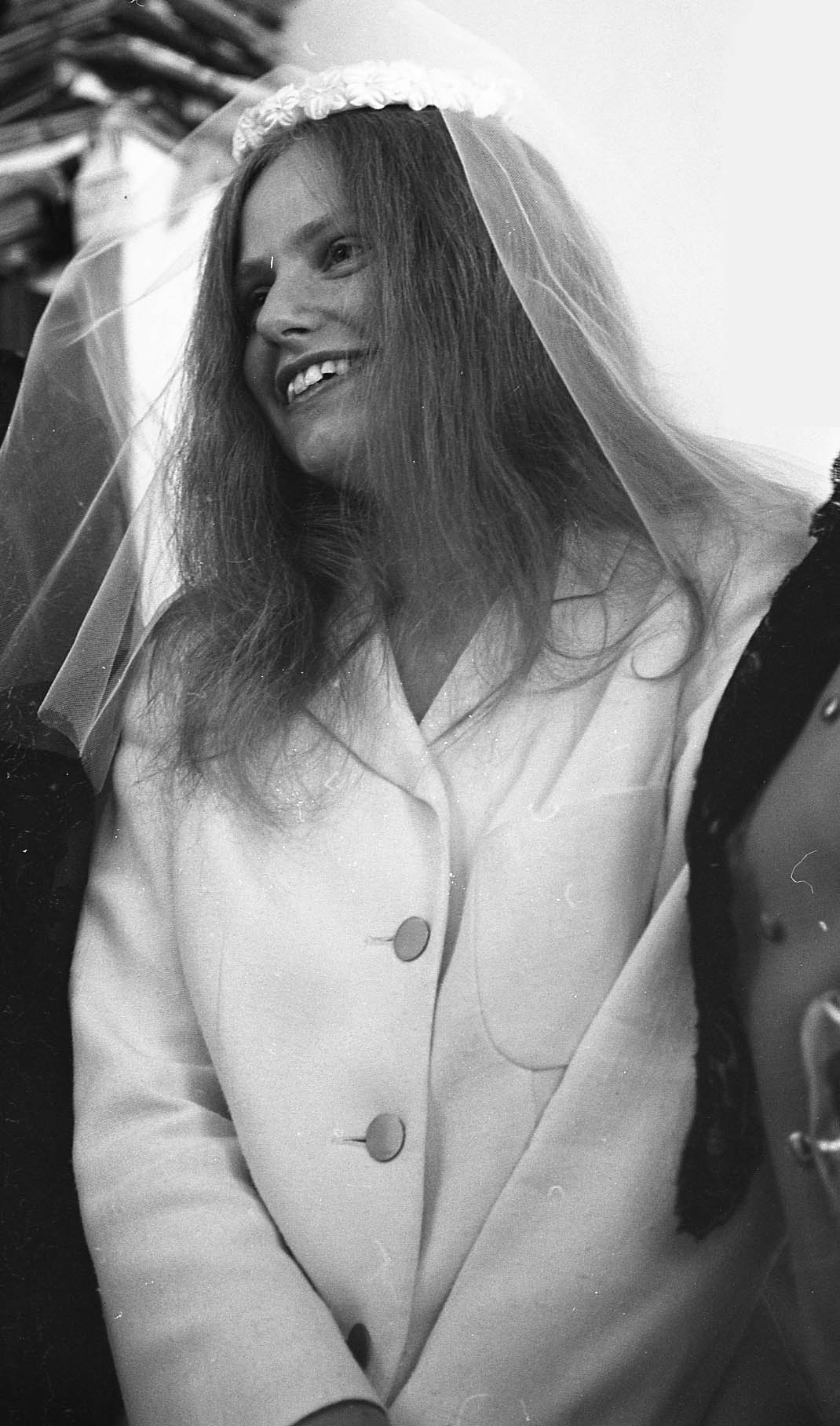
- Du Pré in 1967
- Born: 26 January 1945; Oxford, England
- Died: 19 October 1987 (aged 42); London, England
- Occupation: Cellist
- Spouse: Daniel Barenboim
- Mother: Iris du Pré
- Relatives: Hilary du Pré (sister)

Jacqueline Mary du Pré OBE (26 January 1945 – 19 October 1987) was a British cellist, widely regarded as one of the preeminent cellists of the 20th century. Born in Oxford, she began studying at the Guildhall School of Music in the mid-1950s with William Pleeth, earning the school's Gold Medal in 1960. Her musical development was further enhanced by advanced studies with prominent cellists such as Paul Tortelier, Pablo Casals, and Mstislav Rostropovich.

Du Pré gained early recognition, winning Britain's most prestigious cello award at age 11 and making her official debut at Wigmore Hall at 16. She achieved international acclaim with her 1965 American debut, where she performed Elgar's Cello Concerto, a piece closely associated with her. By the age of 20, she was performing with leading orchestras worldwide. In 1967 she married the acclaimed conductor and pianist Daniel Barenboim, forming a celebrated musical couple.

Her career was cut short in her late twenties by multiple sclerosis, forcing her to withdraw from public performances. Du Pré remained active as a teacher and mentor until her death at the age of 42.

== Early years, education ==
Du Pré was born in Oxford, England, the second child of Iris Greep and Derek du Pré. Derek, originally from the island of Jersey where his family had lived for generations, worked as an accountant at Lloyds Bank in St Helier and London before becoming assistant editor and later editor of The Accountant. Iris was a talented concert pianist who had studied at the Royal Academy of Music.

At the age of four du Pré is said to have heard the sound of the cello on the radio and asked her mother for "one of those". She began with lessons from her mother, who composed little pieces accompanied by illustrations, before enrolling at the London Violoncello School at age five, studying with Alison Dalrymple. For her general education, du Pré was enrolled first at Commonweal Lodge, a now-closed independent school for girls in Purley, and then at the age of eight, transferred to Croydon High School, an independent day school for girls in South Croydon. In 1956, at the age of 11, she won the Guilhermina Suggia Award, and was granted renewal of the award each year until 1961. The Suggia award paid for du Pré's tuition at the Guildhall School of Music in London, and for private lessons with the celebrated cellist William Pleeth.

In late 1958, the family moved to London, where Derek du Pré took the job of Secretary of the Institute of Cost and Works Accounting. In January 1959, du Pré was enrolled in Queen's College, where she fell behind in her schoolwork, and in December du Pré's parents withdrew her from the school. This ended du Pré's general education; she never took the GCE.

From an early age, du Pré was entering and winning local music competitions alongside her sister, flautist Hilary du Pré. In 1959 she began appearing at children's and young musicians' concerts, including with fellow students at the Guildhall end-of-term concert in March, followed by an appearance on BBC Television, playing the Lalo Cello Concerto. In May she repeated the Lalo concerto with the BBC Welsh Orchestra in Cardiff, with an additional recording of the Haydn Cello Concerto at the BBC Lime Grove Studios with the Royal Philharmonic. In 1960 du Pré won the Gold Medal of the Guildhall School of Music and Drama and the same year participated in a Pablo Casals masterclass in Zermatt, Switzerland. Pleeth entered her in the Queen's Prize competition for outstanding musicians under 30. The panel, chaired by Yehudi Menuhin, unanimously awarded du Pré the prize, and Menuhin subsequently invited her to play trios with him and his sister.

== Career ==
In March 1961, at the age of 16, du Pré made her formal début at Wigmore Hall, London. She was accompanied by Ernest Lush, and played sonatas by Handel, Brahms, Debussy and Falla, and a solo cello suite by Bach. She made her concerto début on 21 March 1962 at the Royal Festival Hall playing the Elgar Cello Concerto with the BBC Symphony Orchestra under Rudolf Schwarz; repeating the Elgar at The Proms with the same orchestra on 14 August of the same year, under Sir Malcolm Sargent. In September 1962, du Pré débuted at the Edinburgh Festival with Brahms' Second Cello Sonata, followed by débuts in Berlin in September and Paris in October, playing the Schumann Cello Concerto. After the Paris début, du Pré enrolled at the Conservatoire de Paris to study for six months with Paul Tortelier, the tuition paid by her final Suggia Award stipend, although she continued to refer to Pleeth as her primary teacher.

In 1963, du Pré performed at The Proms, playing the Elgar Concerto with Sir Malcolm Sargent. Her performance of the concerto proved so popular that she returned three years in succession to perform the work. At her 3 September 1964 Prom Concert, she performed the Elgar concerto as well as the world premiere of Priaulx Rainier's Cello Concerto. Du Pré became a favourite at the Proms, returning every year until 1969.

In 1965, at age 20, du Pré recorded the Elgar Concerto for EMI with the London Symphony Orchestra and Sir John Barbirolli, which brought her international recognition. This recording has become a benchmark for the work, and one which has never been out of the catalogue since its release. Du Pré also performed the Elgar with the BBC Symphony Orchestra under Antal Doráti for her United States début, at Carnegie Hall on 14 May 1965. In 1966 du Pré studied in Russia with Mstislav Rostropovich, who was so impressed with his pupil that at the end of his tutorship he declared her "the only cellist of the younger generation that could equal and overtake [his] own achievement."

In 1968, at the suggestion of Ian Hunter, a composition was created by Alexander Goehr specifically for du Pré, Romanza for cello and orchestra, Op. 24, which she premiered at the Brighton Music Festival, with Daniel Barenboim conducting the New Philharmonia Orchestra.

In addition to those already mentioned, du Pré performed with numerous orchestras throughout the world, including the London Philharmonic Orchestra, Cleveland Orchestra, New Philharmonia Orchestra, BBC Symphony Orchestra, New York Philharmonic, Philadelphia Orchestra, Chicago Symphony Orchestra, Israel Philharmonic Orchestra, and the Los Angeles Philharmonic (where she performed at The Hollwood Bowl with her husband, Daniel Barenboim, conducting). She made her debut with the Berlin Philharmonic in 1968 playing Dvořák's Cello Concerto in B minor with Zubin Mehta. She regularly performed with conductors such as Barbirolli, Sargent, Sir Adrian Boult, Daniel Barenboim, and Leonard Bernstein.

Du Pré primarily played on two Stradivarius cellos, one from 1673 and the Davidov Stradivarius of 1712. Both instruments were gifts from her godmother, Isména Holland, the wife of composer Theodore Holland. She performed with the 1673 Stradivarius from 1961 until 1964, when she acquired the Davidov. Many of her most famous recordings were made on this instrument, including the Elgar Concerto with Barbirolli, the Robert Schumann Cello Concerto with Barenboim and the two Brahms cello sonatas. From 1969 to 1970 she (like Casals before her) played on a Francesco Goffriller cello, and in 1970 acquired a modern instrument from the Philadelphia violin maker Sergio Peresson. It was the Peresson cello that du Pré played for the remainder of her career until 1973, using it for a second, live, recording of the Elgar Concerto, and her last studio recording, of Frédéric Chopin's Cello Sonata in G minor and César Franck's Violin Sonata in A arranged for cello, in December 1971.

Her friendship with musicians Yehudi Menuhin, Itzhak Perlman, Zubin Mehta and Pinchas Zukerman, and marriage to Daniel Barenboim led to many memorable chamber-music performances. In a book review for two biographies about the cellist, Eugenia Zukerman, the flautist and former wife of Pinchas Zukerman, judged du Pré "one of the most stunningly gifted musicians of our time". The 1969 performance at the Queen Elizabeth Hall in London of the Schubert Piano Quintet in A major, "The Trout", was the basis of a film, The Trout, by Christopher Nupen. Nupen made other films featuring du Pré, including Jacqueline du Pré and the Elgar Cello Concerto, a documentary featuring a live performance of the Elgar; and The Ghost, with Barenboim and Zukerman in a performance of the "Ghost" Piano Trio in D major, by Beethoven.

== Personal life ==
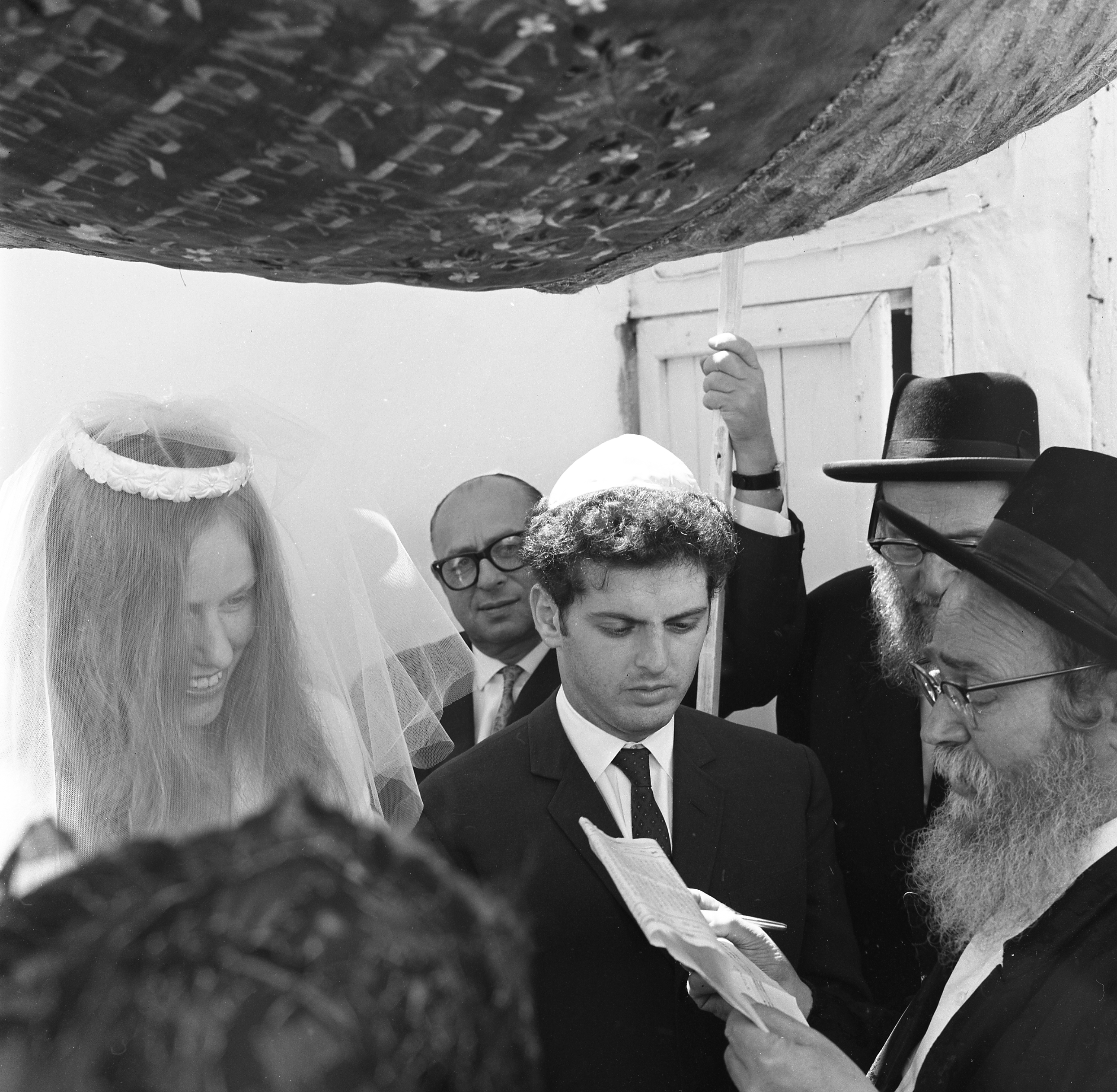
Wedding of Jacqueline du Pré and Daniel Barenboim, Jerusalem, 1967

=== Marriage ===
Du Pré met pianist and conductor Daniel Barenboim in London on Christmas Eve 1966. Shortly before the Six-Day War of 1967, she cancelled all of her current engagements and flew to Jerusalem with Barenboim. There, she converted to Judaism and they married at the Western Wall on 15 June 1967 after giving concerts around Israel for its troops and citizens. Barenboim and du Pré were highly regarded as a "golden couple" in the music industry during the late 1960s and early 1970s, with their extensive performing and recording collaborations being ranked as some of the finest of their time.

The posthumous memoir A Genius in the Family (later renamed Hilary and Jackie) by Jacqueline's siblings Hilary du Pré and Piers, published well after her death, alleges that she had an extramarital affair with Christopher Finzi, her brother-in-law, from 1971 to 1972 when she was visiting Hilary's family.

=== Disability ===
In 1971, du Pré's playing declined as she began to lose sensitivity in her fingers and other parts of her body. She was diagnosed with multiple sclerosis in October 1973. Her last recording, of sonatas by Chopin and Franck (the latter originally for violin), was made in December 1971. She went on sabbatical from 1971 to 1972, and performed only rarely. She started performing again in 1973, but by then her condition had become severe. For her January tour of North America, some of the less-than-complimentary reviews were an indication that her condition had worsened except for brief moments when her playing was without noticeable problems. Her last London concerts were in February 1973, including the Elgar Concerto with Zubin Mehta and the New Philharmonia Orchestra on 8 February.

Her last public concerts took place in New York in February 1973: four performances of the Brahms Double Concerto with Pinchas Zukerman and Leonard Bernstein conducting the New York Philharmonic were scheduled. Du Pré recalled that she had problems judging the weight of the bow, and just opening the cello case had become difficult. As she had lost sensation in her fingers, she had to coordinate her fingering visually. She played only three of the four concerts, cancelling the last, in which Isaac Stern took her place on the programme with Felix Mendelssohn's Violin Concerto.

Whilst definitive diagnosis of du Pré's MS type is not available, some speculate that it was relapsing–remitting multiple sclerosis (RRMS). Others have characterised the course as more consistent with primary progressive MS, while postulating that the unusual pattern of symptom development might reflect syringomyelia or syringobulbia associated with Chiari malformation leading to noncommunicating hydrocephalus. Use of corticosteroids may have had adverse effects, including Cushing's syndrome.

== Death ==
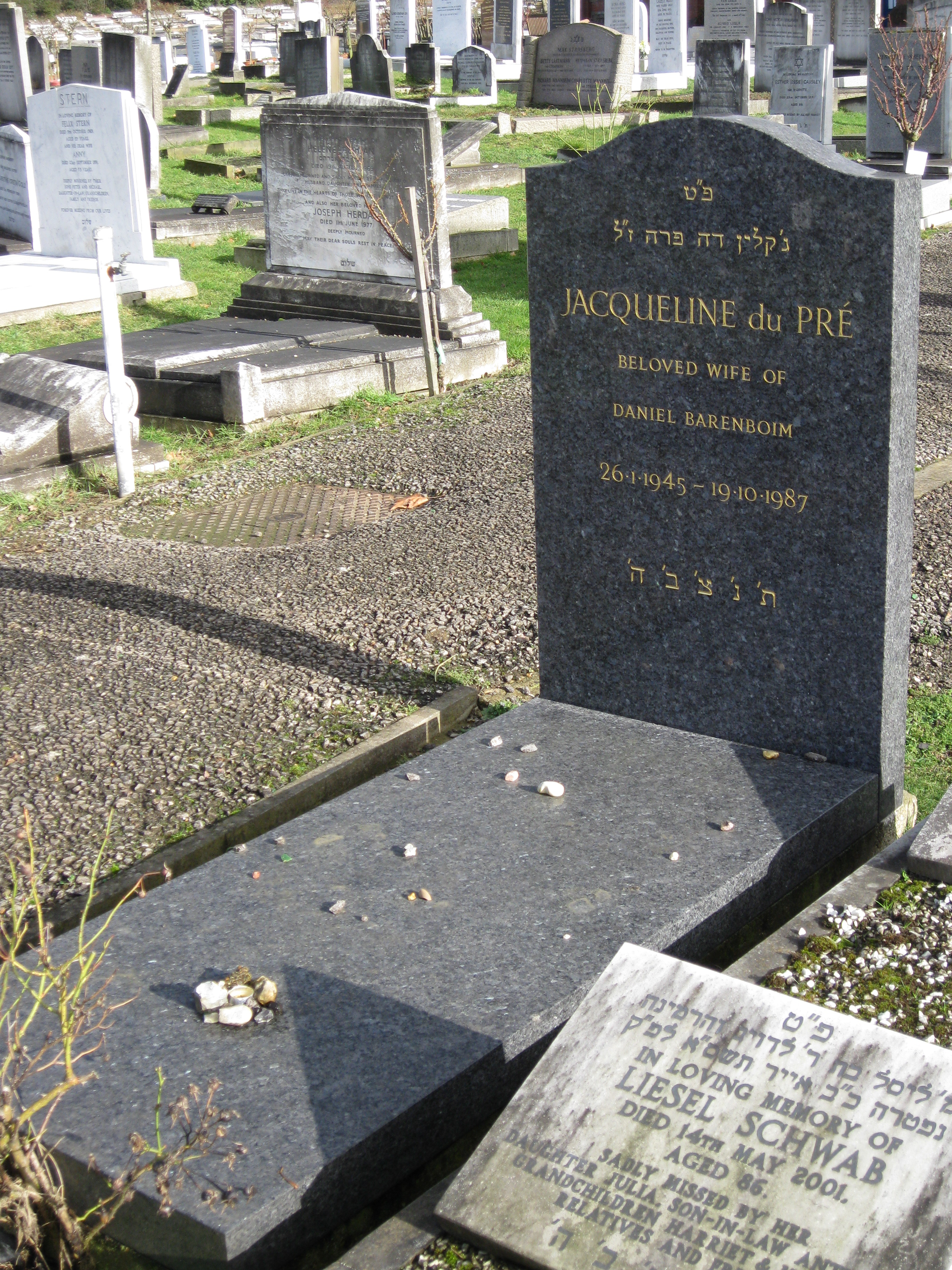
Gravestone of du Pré, pictured in 2010

Du Pré died in London on 19 October 1987 at age 42, and is buried in Golders Green Jewish Cemetery.

The Louis Vuitton Foundation purchased her Davidov Stradivarius for just over £1 million and made it available on loan to Yo-Yo Ma. After being owned by the Norwegian cellist Øyvind Gimse, the 1673 Stradivarius, named by Lynn Harrell the Du Pré Stradivarius in tribute, is now on extended loan to Hungarian cellist István Várdai. Du Pré's 1970 Peresson cello is currently on loan to cellist Kyril Zlotnikov of the Jerusalem Quartet.

In 2021, actress Miriam Margolyes wrote in her memoir This Much Is True that du Pré died in an assisted suicide. She stated that her therapist, Margaret Branch, told her that she assisted the suicide via lethal injection. Du Pré's husband, Daniel Barenboim, called the statement "unverifiable" and said it had "absolutely nothing to do with the reality of Jackie's passing".

== Cultural depictions ==
=== Book and film ===
The posthumous memoir A Genius in the Family by Hilary and Piers du Pré was written at the same time as the 1998 film Hilary and Jackie, directed by Anand Tucker, which was based partially on interviews with Hilary and Piers. The film's release promoted the popularity of the memoir. Both the book and the film have been criticised for sensationalising Jacqueline du Pré's personal life, although the general claim of an affair was supported by others.

The memoir's content in general remains factually unsupported and disputed, and contains significant omissions. The memoir's actual description of events is ambiguous, and describes Jacqueline's sudden request for sexual "therapy sessions" as occurring within a period of extreme mental depression. The unusual depression (deemed an early symptom of multiple sclerosis) also coincided with a long period in which Finzi took the initiative in verbally comforting Jacqueline. Hilary claims that she was helping her sister through her depression. She also argues, however, that she was victimised by her sister's demands, and concludes that her sister had a desire for her husband. The memoir's account of the affair with Finzi was contested by Hilary's daughter, Clare Finzi, who suggested that her father was a serial adulterer who had seduced her emotionally vulnerable aunt in a time of great need to gratify his own ego. The posthumous allegation of an affair, combined with Hilary's claim to be victimised, inevitably generated a controversy over Jacqueline du Pré's personal life.

The film Hilary and Jackie differs from the memoir on several key factual points, and has been criticised by some for imposing a scandal on Jacqueline's personal life. Clare Finzi, Hilary's daughter, charged that the film was a "gross misinterpretation which I cannot let go unchallenged." It portrays Jacqueline from Hilary's point of view before moving to a portrayal of events as imagined from Jacqueline's own perspective. The film contains factually disputed elements, portraying Jacqueline as being predatory and actively planning to seduce her sister's husband. The director, Anand Tucker, defends the film's portrayal of an affair by arguing that extant alternatives amount to canonisation or hagiography, and that he was "deeply moved [by] Hilary's sacrifice". The film and book were also defended for their emotional power and broad authenticity, despite fictional content regarding aspects of Jacqueline's personality and the specifics of events.

Writing in The Guardian, however, Hilary defended the film's depiction of events and her sister's personality, arguing that it accurately portrayed her darker side, the "MS side"; and in The New Yorker she argued that detractors simply "want to look only at the pieces of Jackie's life they [are ready to] accept". According to Hilary, "[t]he ravages of MS changed Jackie's personality. The Jackie I knew and loved died years before her actual death in 1987, but to be truthful I had to show the MS side of her". Others, such as Christopher Nupen, took a different view, holding that Jacqueline's struggle with multiple sclerosis was more complex, with sustained periods of normality even to the very end.

In February 2001, a documentary about du Pré directed by Nupen and entitled 'Who Was Jacqueline du Pré?' was broadcast on Channel 5 in the UK. Nupen said in an interview with The Observer that while the documentary was not meant to be a direct response to Hilary and Jackie, it was intended to celebrate her life, to "remember the person as she was" and to correct public misconceptions about her. "People want to know more about her, and when they encounter her again on the screen they are bowled over by her. She brings you to life. You can't describe that, but you can film it. I've heard people in record shops say, 'I don't want a recording by that strange woman' or that 'awful woman'. Well, she wasn't an awful woman; she was quite the opposite of that."

A new film for the American Public Broadcasting System, Jacqueline du Pré: Genius and Tragedy was premiered in 2025 in the year that would have included du Pré's 80th birthday. It is narrated by cellist Yo-Yo Ma and features interviews and archival footage; it does not mention her sister's controversial book and the related film. The film's producer, London-based Allegro Films, was founded as an independent production company in 1968 by Christopher Nupen. He had a great interest in classical music topics, and directed several films about du Pré starting with The Trout based on her 1969 performance at Queen Elizabeth Hall.

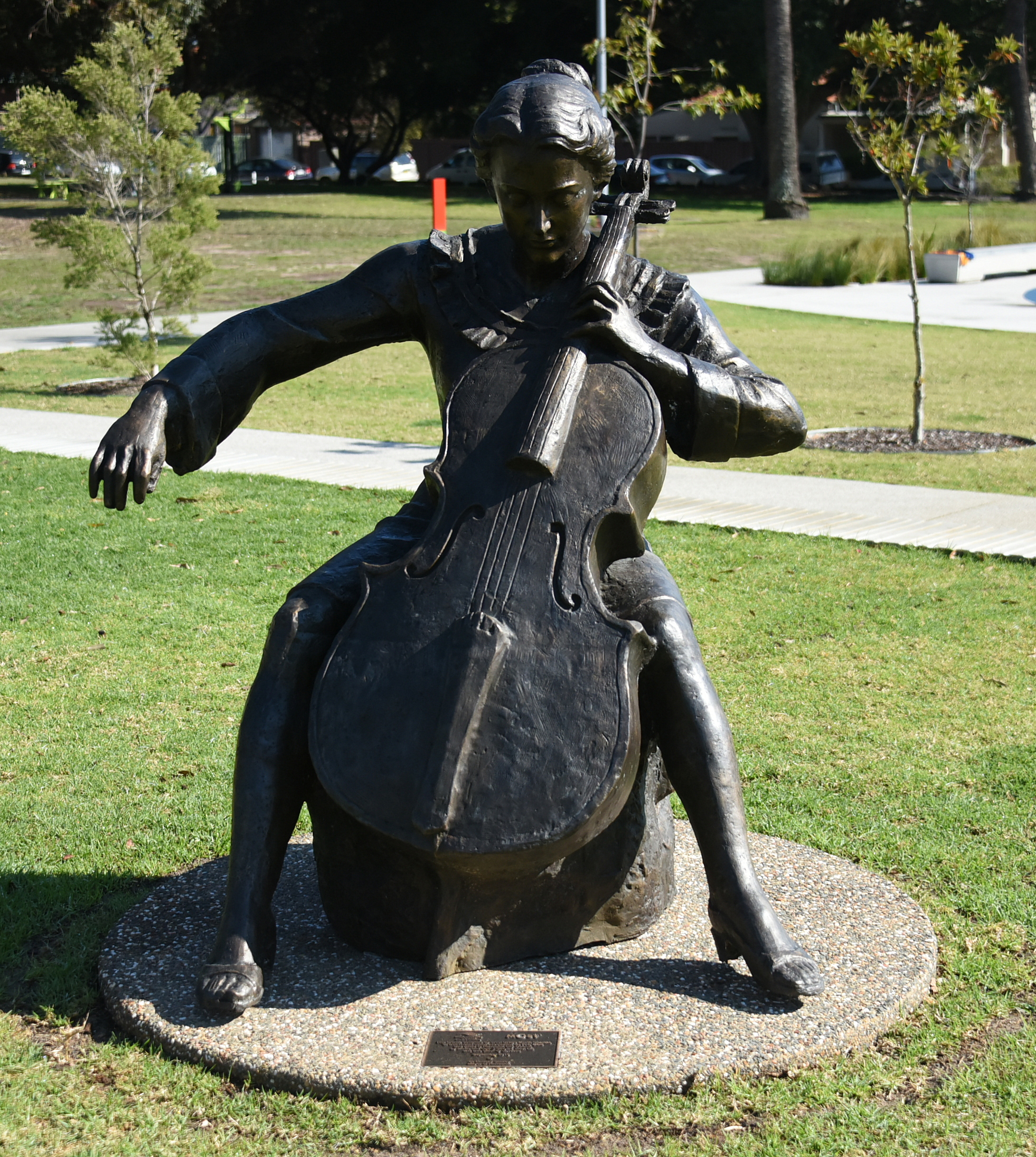
Sculpture of du Pré by Drago Marin Cherina

=== Ballet ===
Choreographer Cathy Marston choreographed a one-act ballet titled The Cellist, based on du Pré's life, for The Royal Ballet. The ballet premiered in 2020 at the Royal Opera House, with Lauren Cuthbertson as "The Cellist", Matthew Ball as "The Conductor" and Marcelino Sambé as "The Instrument".

=== Opera ===
Jacqueline by Luna Pearl Woolf (music) and Royce Vavrek (libretto) had its world premiere at Canada's National Ballet School's Betty Oliphant Theatre in Toronto, in a production by Tapestry Opera, on 19 February 2020.

== Honours and awards ==
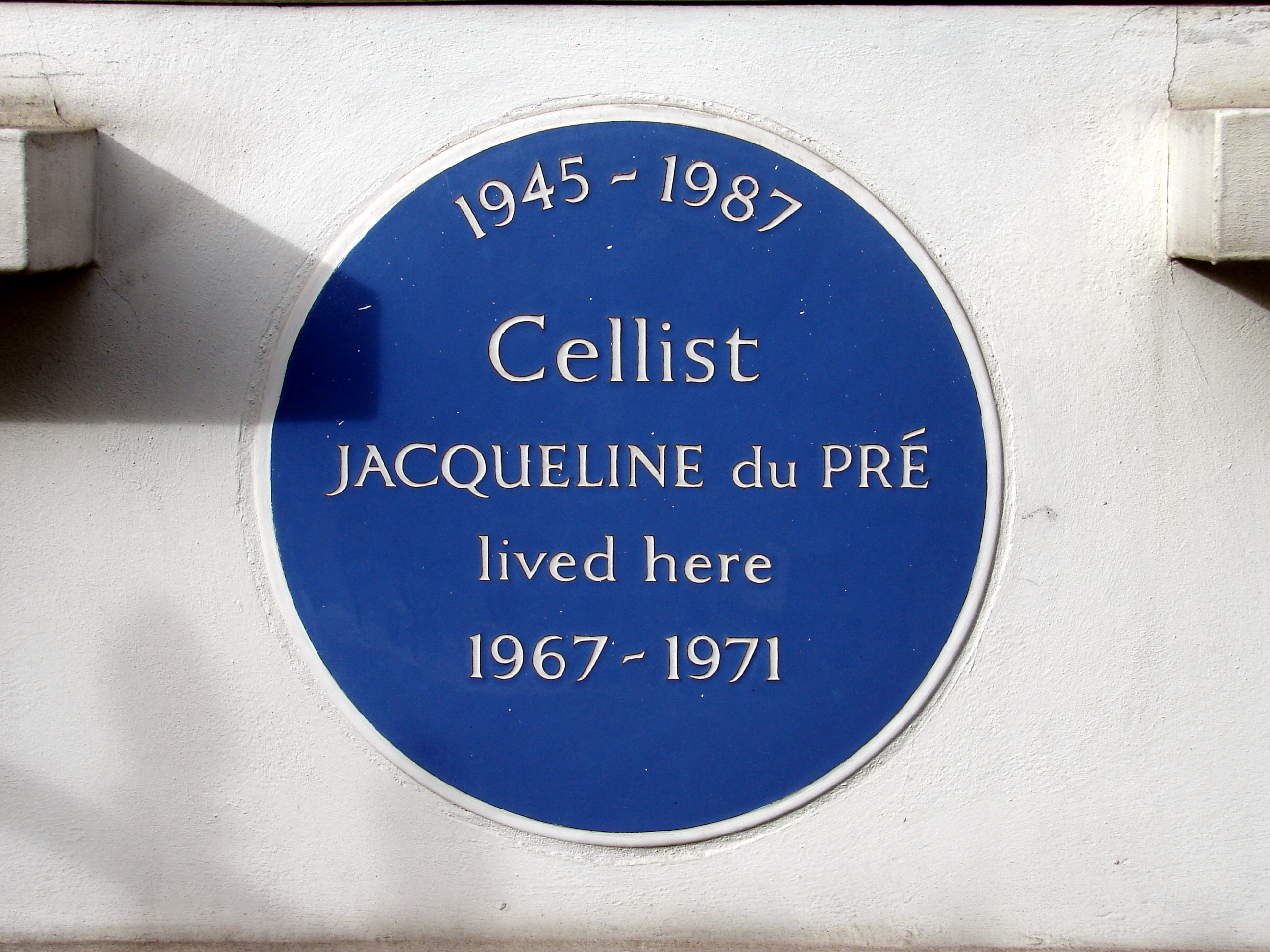
Blue plaque at 27 Upper Montagu Street, Marylebone

Du Pré received several fellowships from music academies and honorary doctorate degrees from universities for her outstanding contributions to music in general and her instrument in particular. In 1956, at the age of 11, she was the second recipient (after Rohan de Saram in 1955) of the prestigious Guilhermina Suggia Award, and remains the youngest recipient. In 1960, she won the Gold Medal of the Guildhall School of Music in London and the Queen's Prize for British musicians. She was appointed an Officer of the Order of the British Empire in the 1976 New Year Honours. At the 1977 BRIT Awards, she won the award for the best classical soloist album of the past 25 years for Elgar's Cello Concerto.

After her death, a rose cultivar named after her received the Award of Garden Merit from the Royal Horticultural Society. She was made an honorary fellow of St Hilda's College, Oxford, whose music building bears her name.

There is a blue plaque celebrating her memory at her former home, 27 Upper Montagu Street, Marylebone.

In 2012, she was voted into the first Gramophone Hall of Fame.

== Discography ==
Title	Label	Release year	Composer(s)
Cello Concerto in E minor, Op. 85 / Concerto for Cello and Orchestra	His Master's Voice	1965	Elgar, Delius
Cello Concerto / Sea Pictures	His Master's Voice	1965	Elgar
Concerto for Cello and Orchestra / Songs of Farewell, for Double Chorus and Orchestra / A Song Before Sunrise	Angel Records	1966	Delius
Cello Sonatas No. 3 in A, Op. 69 / No. 5 in D, Op. 102 No. 2	His Master's Voice	1966	Beethoven
Haydn: Cello Concerto in C / Boccherini: Cello Concerto in B-flat	EMI, His Master's Voice	1967	Haydn, Boccherini
Cello Concerto / Cello Encores - Bach, Saint-Saëns, Falla, Bruch	Angel Records, EMI	1967	Bach, Saint-Saëns, Falla, Bruch
The Two Sonatas for Cello and Piano	His Master's Voice	1968	Brahms
Haydn: Cello Concerto in D / Monn: Cello Concerto in G minor	EMI, His Master's Voice	1969	Haydn, Monn
Cello Concerto in A minor / Cello Concerto No. 1 in A minor	His Master's Voice	1969	Schumann, Saint-Saëns
Trio No. 7 in B-flat major, Op. 97 "Archduke"	His Master's Voice, EMI	1970	Beethoven
Beethoven Trios Op. 1, No. 1 in E-flat major / No. 3 in C minor	Vox Cum Laude	1970	Beethoven
Dvořák: Cello Concerto in B minor & "Silent Woods" Adagio for Cello & Orchestra	EMI, His Master's Voice	1971	Dvořák
Favourite Cello Concertos	His Master's Voice, EMI	1971	Dvořák, Elgar, Haydn, Schumann
Chopin: Sonata in G minor / Franck: Sonata in A	Angel Records	1972	Chopin, Franck
Cello Concerto, Op. 85 / Enigma Variations	CBS Masterworks	1974	Elgar
Beethoven: The Five Cello Sonatas, Magic Flute and Judas Maccabaeus Variations	His Master's Voice	1976	Beethoven
Peter and the Wolf, Toy Symphony	Deutsche Grammophon	1980	Prokofiev, Leopold Mozart
A Jacqueline Du Pré Recital	EMI, His Master's Voice	1982	
Chopin: Cello Sonata in G minor / Franck: Sonata in A	EMI	1989	Chopin
Jacqueline Du Pré: Her Early BBC Recordings, Volume 1	EMI	1989	Bach, Britten, Falla
Jacqueline Du Pré: Her Early BBC Recordings, Volume 2	EMI	1989	Brahms, Couperin, Handel
Cello Concertos	EMI Classics	1995	Dvořák, Elgar
Recital / Delius	EMI Classics	1995	Delius
Don Quixote		1996	Strauss
Cello Concertos	EMI Classics	1998	Haydn, Boccherini
Jacqueline Du Pré: Her Early BBC Recordings 1961-1965	EMI	1999	Bach, Britten, Falla, Brahms, Couperin, Handel
Beethoven Piano Trios, Opp. 1 & 97 "Archduke"	EMI Classics	2001	Beethoven
The Genius of Jacqueline Du Pré	EMI	2001	Bach, Beethoven
Cello Concerto / Sea Pictures / Overture: Cockaigne	EMI Classics	2004	Elgar
Dvořák, Ibert	BBC	2004	Dvořák, Ibert
Elgar: Cello Concerto in E minor, Op.85, Bach: Cello Suites Nos.1 & 2	Testament Records	2005	Elgar, Bach
Elgar Cello Concerto	Sony Classical	2006	Elgar

On DVD

- Remembering Jacqueline du Pré (1994), directed by Christopher Nupen
- Jacqueline du Pré in Portrait (2004), directed by Christopher Nupen
- The Trout (1970 documentary released on DVD in 2005), directed by Christopher Nupen
- Jacqueline du Pré: A Celebration of Her Unique and Enduring Gift (2007), directed by Christopher Nupen
- Hilary and Jackie (1998), dramatised portrait directed by Anand Tucker
