= Le Pré =

Le Pré may refer to the following communes in France:

- Le Pré-d'Auge, Calvados
- Le Pré-Saint-Gervais, Seine-Saint-Denis

== See also ==
- Ivoy-le-Pré, Cher, France
- Saint-Martin-sur-le-Pré, Marne, France
- Villiers-le-Pré, Manche, France
