= Du Pré Stradivarius =

1673 cello used by Jacqueline du Pré

The Du Pré Stradivarius is a cello made by the Italian luthier Antonio Stradivari in Cremona. It has also been known generically as the 1673 Stradivarius as it is the only cello made by Stradivari in that year.

Recent owners have included the cellists Jacqueline du Pré (1945–1987), Lynn Harrell and Nina Kotova.

Harrell purchased the cello from the ailing du Pré in 1984, and subsequently took legal steps to have the cello renamed the Jacqueline du Pré Stradivari. While visiting New York in May 2001, Harrell forgot his cello when leaving a taxicab. The cab driver returned it. The Louis Vuitton Foundation now owns the instrument.

The cello is currently being played by István Várdai.
