= Sergio Peresson =

Italian-born violin maker

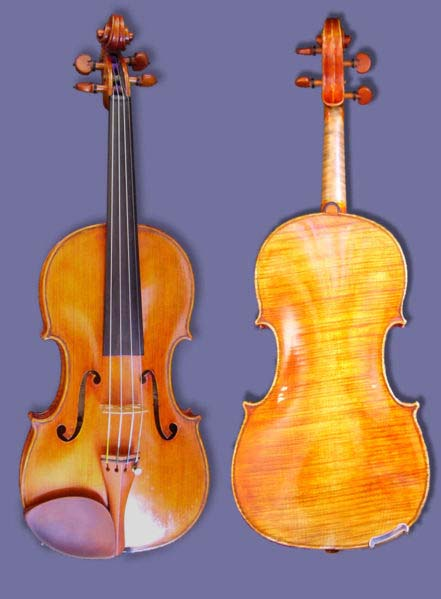
1981 Sergio Peresson Violin

Sergio Peresson (1913–1991) was an Italian-born violin maker.

Born in 1913 in Udine, Italy, Sergio made his first violin in 1943 before moving to Caracas, Venezuela, in 1947. There he primarily did repair work for the Venezuelan Symphony Orchestra and had a modest production of new instruments. He moved to Philadelphia in 1963 and was employed by William Moennig and Son. It was under the aegis of the Moennig shop that Peresson was finally able to see and copy the best instruments. He fashioned many copies of old masters (among them the 1743 'Spalding' Guarneri del Gesù owned by concertmaster Norman Carol) and gained notoriety among players. He left Moennig in 1971 and established himself with a workshop in his home in Haddonfield, New Jersey. It is generally acknowledged that Peresson's finest instruments were crafted from about the mid 1970s to the early 1980s.

Soloists who have owned and performed on Peresson instruments include: Isaac Stern, Yehudi Menuhin, Ivan Galamian, William DePasquale, Pinchas Zukerman, Norman Carol, Jaime Laredo, Eugene Fodor, Maria Bachmann, Lenuta Ciulei, Mstislav Rostropovich, Jacqueline du Pré, and Alexander Markov who performed his famous recording of Paganini's 24 Caprices on a 1970 Peresson violin.

Peresson mostly made violins and violas, but his cellos are exceptional.

Norman Carol, former concertmaster of the Philadelphia Orchestra and owner of two Peresson violins, called him "the most outstanding maker" in the world.

From 1970, du Pré's primary performance instrument was a Peresson cello. Commissioned by her husband Daniel Barenboim in 1970, it was used in the live 1970 recording of the Elgar Cello Concerto, with Barenboim conducting the Philadelphia Orchestra. After du Pré's death in 1987 the instrument passed to Alison Eldridge for a time, and is on loan from Barenboim to Kyril Zlotnikov of the Jerusalem String Quartet.

In 1982, Peresson stopped taking new orders for his instruments due to an inability to meet demand. At the time there was a waiting list of 180 musicians who had placed orders, said his wife, Margit.

Although his instruments sound like those of the Stradivarius or Guarnerius instruments, Peresson liked to think there is also a distinct Peresson sound. He firmly believed that important elements in any musical instrument are a beautiful and rich tone, carrying or projecting power, and being responsive to the fingers of the player. He likened violin making to violin playing, in that with both, the genuinely great can be distinguished easily from the good. Mrs. Peresson sent a message on her late husband's behalf: "My instruments are my own model, and in my opinion the principal qualities of an ideal violin, viola or violoncello are beauty, quality, evenness and clarity of tone, rich sonority, powerful projection, and quick and easy response."

== Quotations ==
When I told people who I was making it for, they stared at me in amazement. They constantly reminded me that Jackie had the Davydov Strad and a Gofriller. What on earth did she want with a Peresson?

— Sergio Peresson, referencing Jacqueline du Pré.

Rostropovich also recognised the need for instruments by modern master craftsmen; he owned a cello made by Sergio Peresson which he used whenever he needed a more powerful carrying tone.

— referencing Margaret Campbell
