= A Genius in the Family (book) =

Memoir of Jacqueline du Pré

- Author: Piers and Hilary du Pré
- Language: English
- Subject: Jacqueline du Pré
- Genre: Non-fiction
- Publisher: Heinemann
- Publication date: 1996
- Publication place: United Kingdom
- ISBN: 0-434-00344-1

A Genius in the Family is a memoir by Piers and Hilary du Pré, which chronicles the life and career of their late sister, cellist Jacqueline du Pré. The book claims to tell the true story of their family lives, and each chapter is headed 'Piers' or 'Hilary', according to which author wrote it.

A film, Hilary and Jackie, was made in 1998 telling essentially the same story, but did not mirror details of events as recounted in the book. The film and the book were both developed simultaneously. This film is not an adaptation of an already-published book. An 'Inside Film' programme, handed out at showings of the film quotes screenwriter Frank Cottrell Boyce as saying, "Hilary was working on the book at the same time as I was working on the film ... it was at a very early stage when we were doing the script." The film was in fact based on conversations with Hilary and Piers, and unlike the book, does not claim to be the true story. This distinction is important because both film and book have attracted intense criticism, especially from music lovers and friends of the cellist, and from her husband, the famous musician and conductor Daniel Barenboim, who feel that they have sullied the memory of her with details of her private life that are either contested or too shocking to be made public.
