= Proportionate reduction of error =

Proportionate reduction of error (PRE) is the gain in precision of predicting dependent variable $y$ from knowing the independent variable $x$ (or a collection of multiple variables). It is a goodness of fit measure of statistical models, and forms the mathematical basis for several correlation coefficients. The summary statistics is particularly useful and popular when used to evaluate models where the dependent variable is binary, taking on values {0,1}.

== Example ==
If both $x$ and $y$ vectors have cardinal (interval or rational) scale, then without knowing $x$, the best predictor for an unknown $y$ would be $\bar{y}$, the arithmetic mean of the $y$-data. The total prediction error would be $E_1 = \sum_{i=1}^n{(y_i - \bar{y})^2}$ .

If, however, $x$ and a function relating $y$ to $x$ are known, for example a straight line $\hat{y}_i = a + b x_i$, then the prediction error becomes $E_2 = \sum_{i=1}^n{(y_i - \hat{y})^2}$. The coefficient of determination then becomes $r^2 = \frac{E_1 - E_2}{E_1} = 1 - \frac{E_2}{E_1}$ and is the fraction of variance of $y$ that is explained by $x$. Its square root is Pearson's product-moment correlation $r$.

There are several other correlation coefficients that have PRE interpretation and are used for variables of different scales:

predict	from	coefficient	symmetric
nominal, binary	nominal, binary	Guttman's λ	yes
ordinal	nominal	Freeman's θ	yes
cardinal	nominal	η$^2$	no
ordinal	binary, ordinal	Wilson's e	yes
cardinal	binary	point biserial correlation	yes
