= George Du Pré Porcher =

English cricketer

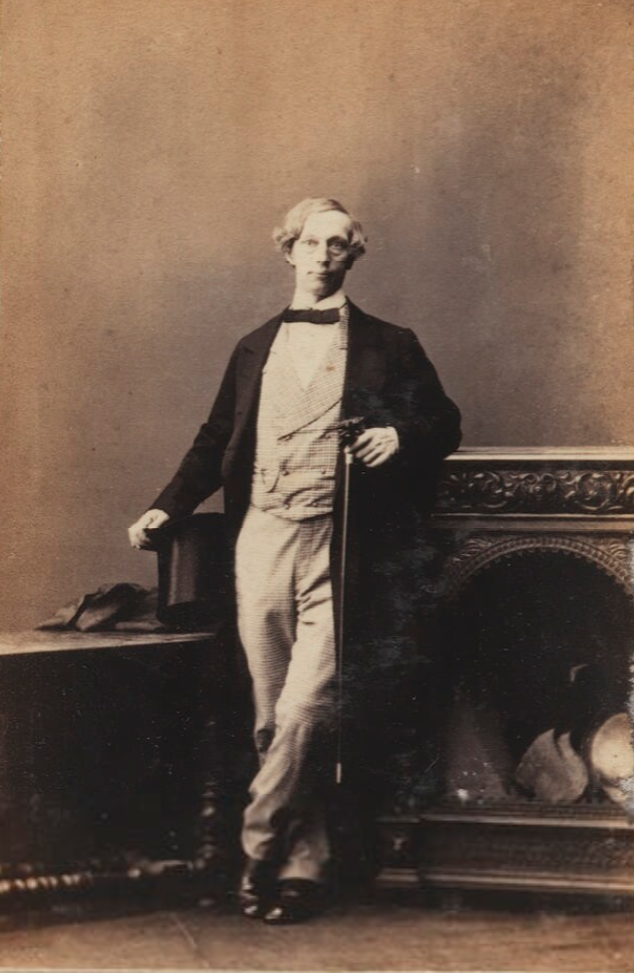

Personal information
- Full name: George Du Pré Porcher
- Born: c. 1823; Chichester, Sussex, England
- Died: 10 March 1876 (aged 52/53); Hyde Park, London, England
- Batting: Unknown

Domestic team information
- Years: Team
- 1848–1851: Marylebone Cricket Club

Career statistics
Competition	First-class
Matches	3
Runs scored	87
Batting average	21.75
100s/50s	–/–
Top score	39
Catches/stumpings	1/–
- Source: Cricinfo, 22 April 2021

George Du Pré Porcher (c. 1823 – 10 March 1876) was an English first-class cricketer and barrister.

The son of The Reverend George Du Pré Porcher, he was born in 1823, most likely in Chichester, where his father was resident at the time of his birth. He was educated at Winchester College, before going up to Balliol College, Oxford. During his final year at Cambridge, he played two first-class cricket matches for the Marylebone Cricket Club (MCC), both against Oxford University Cricket Club at Oxford and Lord's respectively. A student of the Inner Temple, he was called to the bar in 1849 and practiced law on the Western Circuit. He made a third and final first-class appearance for the MCC in 1851 against Cambridge University at Lord's. Du Pré Porcher scored 87 runs in his three matches, with a highest score of 39. He married Emmeline Stratton in 1854. Du Pré Porcher died at Hyde Park in March 1876.
