= Nishinihon International Music Competition =

International music festival held in Fukuoka, Japan

The Nishinihon International Music Competition is a music competition held in Fukuoka, Japan. The competition has been held for over 56 years. The competition has provided talented musicians from West Japan (Nishinihon in Japanese). There have been more than 1000 participants. Starting from the 54th competition, the area of audition has been expanded from West Japan to the Nationwide and the world. More prominent jury members have been invited as well. The competition aims to introduce new talents from Fukuoka Prefecture.

It is open to applicants for Piano, Voice, Violin and other String instruments, Wind instruments.
