= Anand Tucker =

British film director and producer

- Born: 24 June 1963 (age 62); Bangkok, Thailand
- Occupations: Film director; film producer

Anand Tucker (born 24 June 1963) is a film director and producer based in London. He began his career directing factual television programming and adverts. He co-owns the production company Seven Stories.

== Personal life ==
Tucker was born in Thailand to an Indian father and German mother. He attended Island School.

== Filmography as director ==
=== Feature films ===
- Saint-Ex (1996)
- Hilary and Jackie (1998)
- Shopgirl (2005)
- And When Did You Last See Your Father? (2007)
- Red Riding: The Year of Our Lord 1983 (2009)
- Leap Year (2010)
- The Critic (2023)

=== TV Series ===
- Gothica (Unaired Pilot for ABC series) (2013)
- Rogue (Season 2 – Episode 5 'Cruising') (2014)
- Indian Summers (first season opening block – 4 episodes) (2015)

=== TV Documentaries ===
- Naked Sport: Welcome to the Sewer (1993)
- Naked Sport: Fields of Blood (1993)
- Naked Sport: The Big Pitch (1993)
- Bookmark: The Vampire's Life (1993)
- Champions: Football Crazy (1994)
- Omnibus: The Greatest Living Painter – De Kooning (1994)

=== Commercials / Advertising ===
- Rover – "Rover 600 – Dah" (1996)
- Carlsberg – "Carlsberg Euro 1996" (1996)
- British Gas Company – "Loch Ness" (1999)
- McDonald's – "Hook's Back" (2002)

== Filmography as producer ==
- Girl with a Pearl Earring (2003)
- Incendiary (2008)
- The Railway Man (2013)
- Selection Day (2018)
