= Martin Rummel =

Austrian cellist (born 1974)

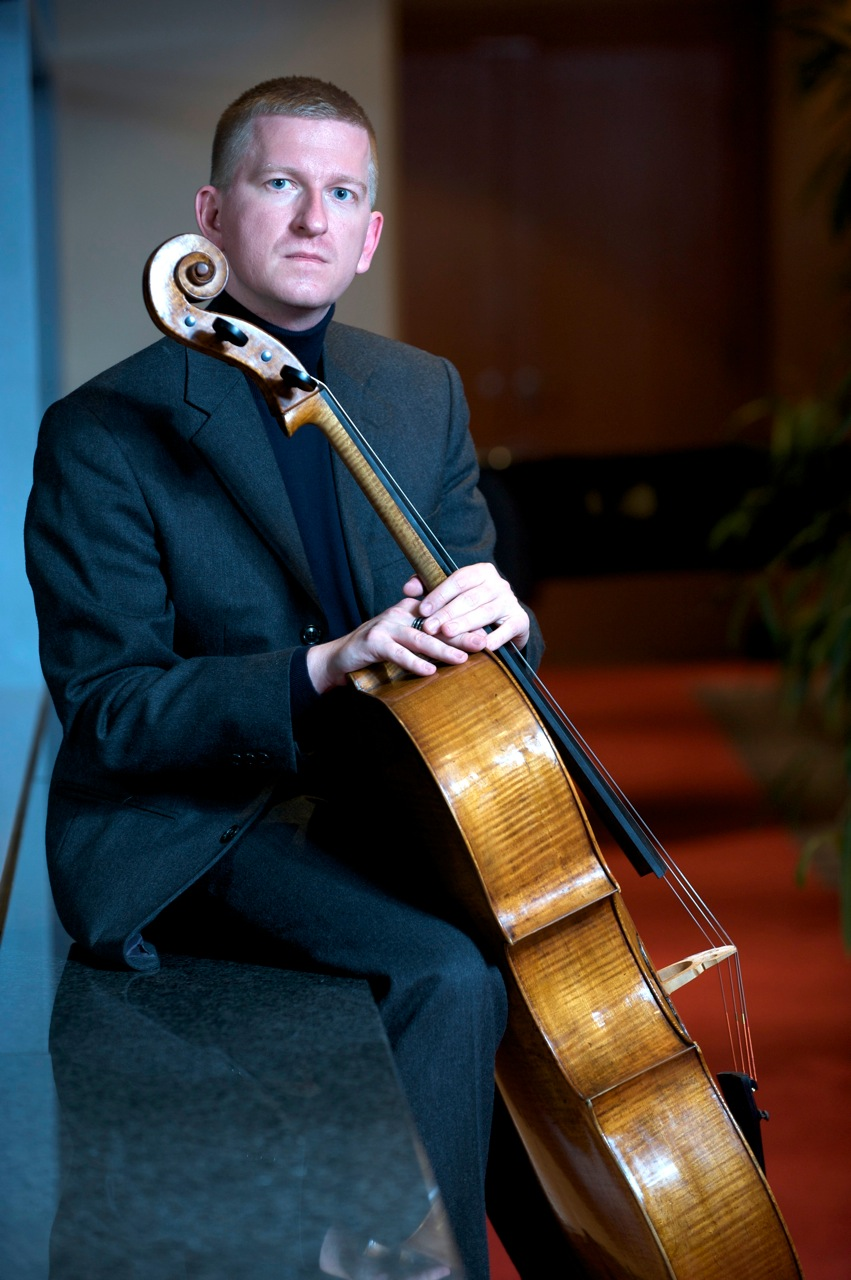
- Martin Rummel
- Born: 2 May 1974 (age 52); Linz, Austria
- Occupation: musician

Martin Rummel (born 2 May 1974) is an Austrian cellist.

== Biography ==
The son of Peter Rummel, professor of law, grew up in Linz, where he went to primary school and graduated from Akademisches Gymnasium, where he received a Classical education, with highest marks in 1992. After early harpsichord and piano lessons from Helga Schiff-Riemann, he started to learn the cello in 1982 from Wilfried Tachezi at what is today the Anton Bruckner Private University for Music, Drama, and Dance. Simultaneously, he studied the harpsichord with August Humer, but did not finish this course. In March 1991, he got his diploma as a concert cellist with highest marks, being the youngest graduate of the institution's history at the time. After a few private lessons from Robert Cohen in London, he then studied there with William Pleeth. In the second half of the 1990s, he also studied with Maria Kliegel in Cologne and received a diploma with distinction and the "Konzertexamen" at the Musikhochschule. Subsequently, Rummel returned to studying with William Pleeth in London, whose last pupil he was to become.

== Cellist ==
Since around 1990, Rummel has been internationally performing as a soloist and chamber musician. Concerts have so far led him throughout Europe, Asia, Oceania and the US. In recent years, he played at the Vienna Konzerthaus, the Vienna Musikverein, the Brucknerhaus in Linz, the Tonhalle Düsseldorf, the Krannert Center for the Performing Arts in Urbana, at the Carinthischer Sommer, the "Varna Summer“ and at the “Venice Biennale“.

Rummel has given countless world and national premieres of works, amongst which Graham Whettam's "Concerto Drammatico“ (2000, USA) and the solo cello part in Thomas Daniel Schlee's sacred opera "Ich, Hiob" (2007, Ossiach). He studied the works of many eminent composers, such as Howard Blake, Alfred Schnittke and Sofia Gubaidulina with the composers themselves.

In recent years, Rummel has been increasingly emphasizing his performances of the cycle of the Solo Cello Suites by Johann Sebastian Bach and projects like his own arrangement of Franz Schubert's song cycle “Winterreise”, which he is performing with pianist Norman Shetler and actors such as August Zirner and Xaver Hutter.

== Pedagogue ==
From October 2000 to October 2007, Rummel taught a studio at the Musikakademie Kassel and was appointed at The University of Auckland in November 2008 to teach a cello performance studio. He resigned from this position in 2013 when it could no longer be fit around his international concert and management activities with a home base in Vienna. Effective 1 January 2016 and in the rank of associate professor, he was controversially appointed Head of School at the School of Music at the University of Auckland. 23 out of 25 permanent staff at the School of Music have since passed a vote of no confidence in him after a series of redundancies. Rummel is regularly giving master classes at renowned institutions such as the Holzhauser Musiktage, the University of St Andrews, the Folkwang University, New England Conservatory, Longy School of Music of Bard College, Shanghai Conservatory and the Internationale Sommerakademie Lenk (Switzerland).

Between 2004 and 2009, the Bärenreiter-Verlag published Rummel's editions of all major cello études. For the most important collections by David Popper, Friedrich Grützmacher and Jean-Louis Duport, Rummel wrote text volumes which are included in the editions.

Rummel will become rector of the Anton Bruckner Private University on October 1, 2021.

== Artistic Director and Communication ==
- From 1997 to 1999 artistic director of the concert series "JSB“ at the Ursulinenkirche Linz
- From 2001 to 2002 artistic director of the festival "kammerMUSIK“ at the baroque monastery in Wilhering
- From 2004 to 2005 director of the "Holzhauser Musiktage“
- From 2006 to 2007 president of the "Zentrum für Interkulturelle Begegnung" of the Jewish community in Baden bei Wien
- From 2007 to 2012 director of the "Klassik Musikfest Mühlviertel“ in Oberneukirchen, Austria
- From 2008 to 2011 director of the "Wiener Gitarrefestival“
- From 2010 to 2015 President of the "Vienna Music Group"

From 2004 to 2008, Rummel was CEO of the foundation "Instrumente für Talente", which had been initiated by his mother and is providing young musicians with string instruments. Since 2008, he has been presenting the monthly radio show "Rummels Rubrik“ for Radio Stephansdom, portraying one musician per programme. In 2009 and together with Wolfgang Lamprecht, he founded the record label and agency "paladino music“, which became "paladino media gmbh" in 2012 under Rummel's sole directorship. With the acquisition of KAIROS, an internationally renowned specialist label for contemporary music, paladino media now (with four labels and a sheet music publishing house) is one of Europe's most diversified companies in the classical music industry.

== Discography ==
- Andrea Zani: Complete Divertimenti for violin and cello - Lena Neudauer, violin - Capriccio C5264 (2015)
- Johann Nepomuk Hummel: Mozart's Symphonies Nos 35, 36 and 41 arranged for flute, violin, cello and piano - Uwe Grodd, flute; Friedemann Eichhorn, violin; Roland Krüger, piano - Naxos 8.572842 (2015)
- Franz Schubert: (re)inventions. Sonata for Arpeggione and Piano (arr. for cello and guitar) D 821, Notturno D Anh. II/2 – Alberto Mesirca, guitar; Eric Lamb, flute – paladino music pmr 0058 (2015)
- Wolfgang Amadeus Mozart: (re)inventions – Eric Lamb, flute - paladino music pmr 0050 (2015)
- Johann Nepomuk Hummel: Mozart's Symphonies Nos 38, 39 and 40 arranged for flute, violin, cello and piano - Uwe Grodd, flute; Friedemann Eichhorn, violin; Roland Krüger, piano - Naxos 8.572841 (2014)
- David Popper: Complete Suites for Cello - Alexander Hülshoff, cello - Mari Kato, piano - paladino music pmr 0007 (2014)
- Friedrich Grützmacher: Pieces and Etudes for Cello - Gerda Guttenberg, Piano - Musicaphon CDM56948 (2013)
- Graham Whettam: Complete Cello Music - Sinfonia da camera - Ian Hobson, conductor - paladino music pmr 0041 (2013)
- Andrea Zani: Complete Cello Concertos - Die Kölner Akademie; Michael Alexander Willens, conductor - Capriccio C5145 (2013)
- Johann Sebastian Bach: "(re)inventions vol 1" - Eric Lamb, flute - paladino music pmr 0039 (2013)
- Joseph Merk: "Fleurs d'Italie", "Air suisse varié et Rondeau", "Valses brillantes" - Roland Krüger, piano - Naxos 8.572759 (2013)
- Reinhold Glière: Complete Duets With Cello - Friedemann Eichhorn, violin; Alexander Hülshoff, cello, Till Alexander Körber, piano - Naxos 8.572713 (2013)
- Johann Nepomuk Hummel: Cello Sonata op 104, Flute Trio op 78 ("Schöne Minka") - Christopher Hinterhuber, piano; Walter Auer, flute - paladino music pmr 0019 (2012)
- Graham Whettam: Serenade for cello and guitar WW 45/5 - Alberto Mesirca, guitar - paladino music pmr 0027 (2012)
- Helmut Rogl: "eins.zwei.TRIO" for saxophone, cello and piano op 53 - Peter Rohrsdorfer, saxophone; Gerald Hofer, piano - paladino music pmr 0022 (2012)
- Joseph Merk: 20 Études for cello op 11 - Musicaphon CDM56887 (2012)
- Joseph Haydn: Trios for flute, cello and piano Hob. XV:15-17 - Uwe Grodd, flute; Christopher Hinterhuber, piano - Naxos 8.572667 (2011)
- Franz Schubert: Winterreise D 911 (arr. Rummel) - Xaver Hutter, narrator; Norman Shetler, piano - paladino music pmr 0018 (2011)
- Johannes Brahms, Alexander von Zemlinsky: Trios for clarinet, cello and piano - Dimitri Ashkenazy, clarinet; Christopher Hinterhuber, piano - paladino music pmr 0005 (2011)
- Antonio Vivaldi & Antonio Vivaldi (arr. Luigi Dallapiccola): Six Cello Sonatas - Till Alexander Körber, piano; James Tibbles, harpsichord - Musicaphon CDM56917 (2011)
- Wolfgang Amadeus Mozart: Divertimento K 563 - Christoph Ehrenfellner, violin; Firmian Lermer, viola - paladino music pmr 0013 (2011)
- Manuel de Falla: Suite populaire Espagnole, Luigi Boccherini: Guitar Quintet ("Fandango") - Alberto Mesirca, guitar, et al. - paladino music pmr 0014 (2011)
- Ludwig van Beethoven: Complete Works for Cello and Piano - Gerda Guttenberg, piano - paladino music pmr 0011 (2011)
- Helmut Rogl: Complete Cello Works So Far - Florian Feilmair & Christoph Eggner, piano - Alfred Melichar, accordion et al. - paladino music pmr 0012 (2011)
- Otto Brusatti: MEDEA, with paintings by Christoph Kiefhaber and musical collages on Johann Sebastian Bach - paladino music pmr 0008 (2010)
- Max Reger, Johann Sebastian Bach: Sonatas for cello and piano Vol 2 - Elizabeth Hopkins, piano - Musicaphon CDM56898 (2010)
- Thomas Daniel Schlee: "Ich, Hiob". Sacred Opera op 68 - Kurt Azesberger, tenor; Ursula Langmayr, soprano - paladino music pmr 0002 (2010)
- Johann Sebastian Bach: Suites for Violoncello Solo BWV 1007-1012 (Kellner Manuscript) - paladino music pmr 0004 (2010)
- Felix Battanchon: 12 Études op 25, César Franck: Sonata in A (arr. Rummel) - Elizabeth Hopkins, piano - Musicaphon CDM56918 (2009)
- Max Reger, Johann Sebastian Bach: Sonatas for cello and piano Vol 1 - Elizabeth Hopkins, piano - Musicaphon CDM56894 (2008)
- Ludwig van Beethoven: Complete Cello Works - Gerda Guttenberg, piano - Musicaphon CDM56870 (2007)
- Anton von Webern: Cello Works, Franz Schubert: String Quintet in C, D956, - Christoph Eggner, piano; Akadémia Quartet Budapest - Musicaphon CDM56884 (2006)
- Jean Louis Duport: 21 Études, Sebastian Lee: 40 Easy Études op 70 - Sebastian Hartung, cello II - Musicaphon CDM56878 (2006)
- Wilhelm Hill: Two Romanzas op 22, Piano Quartet op 44 - Gerda Guttenberg, piano; Christine-Maria Höller, violin, Mathias Schessl, viola - Musicaphon CDM56868 (2005)
- David Popper: Suite "In the Forest" op 50 et al. - Gerda Guttenberg, piano - Musicaphon CDM56869 (2005)
- David Popper: Complete Études for Violoncello - Sebastian Hartung, cello II - Musicaphon CDM56858 (2004)
- Helmut Rogl: Cello Concerto et al. - Ensemble "Rara", Erland M. Freudenthaler - Musicaphon CDM55714 (2003)
- Antonín Dvořák: Polonaise op post et al., Leoš Janáček: "Pohádka" et al. - Christoph Eggner, piano - Musicaphon CDM56855 (2003)
- Graham Whettam: "Concerto Drammatico“ - Sinfonia da camera, Ian Hobson - Redcliffe Recordings RR017 (2001)
- Bohuslav Martinu: Concertino (1924) - Österr. Kammersymphoniker, Ernst Theis - Musicaphon CDM56821 (1996)

== Publications ==
=== Editor ===
- David Popper, Martin Rummel (ed.): "Fünf Gesänge op. 2", paladino music, 2015, ISMN 979-0-50207-009-0
- Fridolin Dallinger, Martin Rummel (ed.): "Sonata for cello and accordion", paladino music, 2015, ISMN 979-0-50207-022-9
- Wolfgang Amadeus Mozart, Eric Lamb & Martin Rummel (arr./ed.): (re)inventions for flute and cello, paladino music, 2015, ISMN 979-0-50207-029-8
- David Popper, Martin Rummel (ed.): "Walzer-Suite op. 60 for cello and piano", paladino music, 2015, ISMN 979-0-50207-036-6
- David Popper, Alexander Hülshoff & Martin Rummel (ed.): Suite for two cellos op. 16, paladino music, 2014, ISMN 979-0-50207-034-2
- Isaac Albéniz, Martin Rummel (arr./ed.): Tango op. 165/2 for cello and piano, paladino music, 2014, ISMN 979-0-50207-008-3
- Johann Sebastian Bach, Eric Lamb & Martin Rummel (arr./ed.): (re)inventions for flute and cello, paladino music, 2014, ISMN 979-0-50207-037-3
- Niccolò Paganini, Martin Rummel (arr./ed.): Cantabile op. 17 for cello and guitar, paladino music, 2014, ISMN 979-0-50207-006-9
- Niccolò Paganini, Martin Rummel (arr./ed.): Cantabile op. 17 for cello and piano, paladino music, 2014, ISMN 979-0-50207-007-9
- Helmut Rogl, Martin Rummel (ed.): Three Miniatures for cello solo op 5, paladino music, 2012, ISMN 979-0-50207-005-2
- Fridolin Dallinger, Martin Rummel (ed.): Sonata for cello solo (1978/2009), paladino music, 2012, ISMN 979-0-50207-004-5
- Joseph Haydn, Martin Rummel (arr.): Der Greis, Hob. XXVc:5, arranged for string quartet, paladino music, 2012, ISMN 979-0-50207-002-1
- Felix Battanchon, Martin Rummel (ed.): 12 études in thumb positions, op 25, Bärenreiter-Verlag, 2008, ISMN M-006-53549-1
- Josef Merk, Martin Rummel (ed.): 20 Études for Violoncello, op 11, Bärenreiter-Verlag, 2008, ISMN M-006-53495-1
- Sebastian Lee, Martin Rummel (ed.): 40 Easy Études for Violoncello with accompaniment of a second Violoncello (ad libitum), op 70, Bärenreiter-Verlag, 2007, ISMN M-006-53394-7
- Friedrich Grützmacher, Martin Rummel (ed.): Technology of Violoncello Playing, 24 Études for Violoncello solo, op 38, Bärenreiter-Verlag, 2006, ISMN M-006-53192-9
- Jean-Louis Duport, Martin Rummel (ed.): 21 Études for Violoncello, Bärenreiter-Verlag, 2005, ISMN M-006-52998-8
- David Popper, Martin Rummel (ed.): In the Forest, Suite for Violoncello and Piano, op 50, Bärenreiter-Verlag, 2005, ISMN M-006-53193-6
- David Popper, Martin Rummel (ed.): High School of Violoncello Playing, Forty Études, op 73, Bärenreiter-Verlag, 2004, ISMN M-006-52515-7
- David Popper, Martin Rummel (ed.): 15 easy, melodic-rhythmic Études and 10 Grand Études of moderate difficulty, op 76, 2004, Bärenreiter-Verlag, ISMN M-006-52516-4

=== Author ===
- Reinhard Cebulla, Martin Rummel: Partita Opus Drei, Musikalische Kriminalgroteske, Brockmeyer Verlag, 2005, ISBN 978-3-8196-0669-4
- Reinhard Cebulla, Martin Rummel: Partita Opus Eins, Musikalische Kriminalgroteske, Brockmeyer Verlag, 2002, ISBN 3-8196-0647-5
