= Étude =

Type of instrumental musical composition

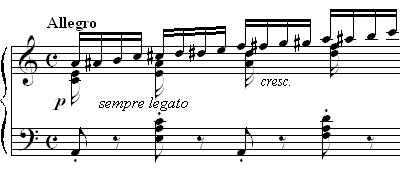
Frédéric Chopin's Étude Op. 10, No. 2: a rapid chromatic scale in the right hand is used to develop the weaker fingers of the right hand. Most études are written to perfect a particular technical skill.

Frédéric Chopin's Étude Op. 25, No. 11

Chopin: "Étude Op. 25, No. 11"
Martha Goldstein performs Frédéric Chopin's Étude Op. 25, No. 11 on an Érard (1851)

Scriabin: "Étude Op. 8, No. 12"
Awadagin Pratt performs Alexander Scriabin's Étude Op. 8, No. 12 at the White House Classical Music Student Workshop Concert

An étude (/ˈeɪtjuːd/; French: [e.tyd]) or study is an instrumental, usually short musical composition designed to provide practice material for perfecting a particular musical skill. The tradition of writing études emerged in the early 19th century with the rapidly growing popularity of the piano. Of the vast number of études from that era, some are still used as teaching material (particularly pieces by Carl Czerny and Muzio Clementi), and a few, by major composers such as Frédéric Chopin, Franz Liszt and Claude Debussy, achieved a place in today's concert repertory. Études written in the 20th century include those related to traditional ones (György Ligeti) and those that require wholly unorthodox technique (John Cage).

== 19th century ==
=== Piano ===
During the 19th century, it was quite popular for composers to write studies, with composer Howard Ferguson saying that "almost every 19th-century pianist-composer wrote studies."

Studies, lessons, and other didactic instrumental pieces composed before the 19th century are extremely varied, without any established genres. Domenico Scarlatti's 30 Essercizi per gravicembalo ("30 Exercises for harpsichord", 1738) do not differ in scope from his other keyboard works, and J.S. Bach's four volumes of Clavier-Übung ("keyboard practice") contain everything from simple organ duets to the extensive and difficult Goldberg Variations.

The situation changed in the early 19th century. Instruction books with exercises became very common. Of particular importance were collections of "studies" by Johann Baptist Cramer (published between 1804 and 1810), early parts of Muzio Clementi's Gradus ad Parnassum (1817–26), numerous works by Carl Czerny, Maria Szymanowska's Vingt exercises et préludes (c. 1820), and Ignaz Moscheles' Studien Op. 70 (1825–26). However, with the late parts of Clementi's collection and Moscheles' Charakteristische Studien Op. 95 (1836–37) the situation began to change, with both composers striving to create music that would both please the audiences in concert and serve as a good teaching tool. Such a combination of didactic and musical value in a study is sometimes referred to as a concert study.

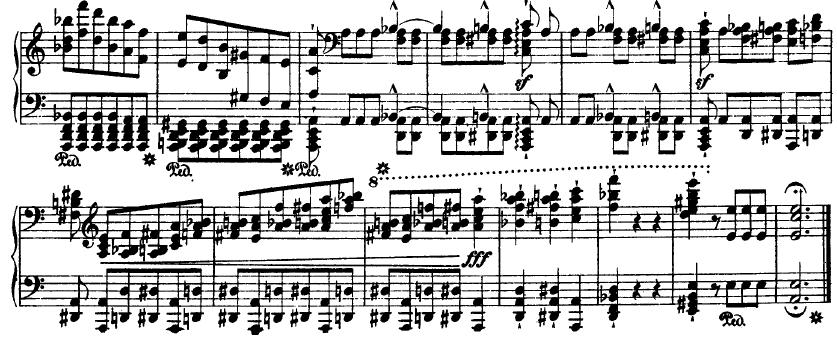
Last bars of Franz Liszt's Transcendental Étude No. 2: one of the most difficult of Liszt's études, this is a study in passages for alternating and overlapping hands.

The technique required to play Chopin's Études, Op. 10 (1833) and Op. 25 (1837) was extremely novel at the time of their publication; the first performer who succeeded at mastering the pieces was the renowned virtuoso composer Franz Liszt (to whom Chopin dedicated the Op. 10). Liszt himself composed a number of études that were more extensive and even more complex than Chopin's. Among these, the most well-known is the collection Études d'Execution Transcendante (final version published in 1852). These did not retain the didactic aspect of Chopin's work, however, since the difficulty and the technique used varies within a given piece. Each of the études has a different character, designated by its name: Preludio; Molto Vivace; Paysage [Landscape]; Mazeppa; Feux Follets [Irrlichter/ Will-o'-the-wisp]; Vision; Eroica [Heroic]; Wilde Jagd [Wild Hunt]; Ricordanza; Allegro Molto Agitato; Harmonies du Soir [Evening Harmonies]; and Chasse-neige [Snow-whirls].

=== Cello ===
Although a specific date of composition is not known, cellist and composer Friedrich Dotzauer composed a set of 113 études during the 19th century, 113 Studies for Cello Solo. Dotzauer composed many different forms of music, ranging from opera and symphonies to chamber pieces. Most of his music has been long forgotten, with the exception of his 113 studies. The first two volumes (studies 1-62) are for intermediate players while the last two volumes (studies 63-113) are for advanced players.

Friedrich Grützmacher composed several works for smaller instrumental groups as well as a book of études for solo cello, 24 Etudes for Cello. The book is divided into two volumes, each with 12 études. The first volume is generally for intermediate players as it does not involve the use of thumb position, while the second volume, which includes the use of thumb position as well as other advanced technique, is for more advances players. The later études in this book are mostly as a showcase for virtuosity, such as double artificial harmonics and off-hand pizzicato.

Grützmacher also composed a set of 12 études titled Elite-Etüden. Each étude in this book was composed in the style of a famous cellist, usually highlighting some technique that the cellist was famous for or their unique playing style. Some of these cellists include Bernhard Romberg, Luigi Boccherini, and Jean-Louis Duport.

Sebastian Lee was a cellist and composed various works for the cello. In 1842, he composed his own book of études: Forty Melodic and Progressive Etudes for Violoncello. Sebastian Lee was mostly known as a virtuosic player and less so of a teacher; he did not directly teach anyone the études from this book. Lee advised against keeping the hand in a strict blocked position when playing using the thumb and suggested keeping the thumb mobile and free, which is how cellists regularly play today.

Lee was a fairly prolific composer of cello études. Aside from his Forty Melodic and Progressive Etudes for Violoncello as mentioned above, he also composed 50 Etüden für den Anfang (First Steps in Violoncello Playing), 40 leichte Etüden in der ersten Lage (40 Easy Etudes for Cello), 12 Études mélodiques (12 Melodic Etudes), among other smaller sets of études.

=== Other instruments ===
The 19th century also saw a number of étude and study collections for instruments other than the piano. Guitarist composer Fernando Sor published his 12 Studies, op. 6 for guitar in London as early as 1815. These works all conform to the standard definition of 19th-century étude in that they are short compositions, each exploiting a single facet of technique. Collections of studies for flute were published during the second half of the 19th century by Ernesto Köhler, Wilhelm Popp and Adolf Terschak.

== 20th century ==
The early 20th century saw the publication of a number of important collections of études. Claude Debussy's Études for piano (1915) conform to the "one facet of technique per piece" rule, but exhibit unorthodox structures with many sharp contrasts, and many concentrate on sonorities and timbres peculiar to the piano, rather than technical points. Leopold Godowsky's 53 Studies on the Chopin Études (1894–1914) are built on Chopin's études: Godowsky's additions and changes elevated Chopin's music to new, hitherto unknown levels of difficulty. Other important études of this period include Heitor Villa-Lobos' virtuoso 12 Études for guitar (1929) and pieces by Russian composers: Sergei Rachmaninoff's Études-Tableaux (1911, 1917) and several collections by Alexander Scriabin (all for piano).

By mid-century the old étude tradition was largely abandoned. Olivier Messiaen's Quatre études de rythme ("Four studies in rhythm", 1949–50) were not didactic compositions, but experiments with scales of durations, as well as with dynamics, figurations, coloration, and pitches. John Cage's études—Études Australes (1974–75) for piano, Études Boreales (1978) for cello and/or piano and Freeman Études (1977–80, 1989–90) for violin—are indeterminate pieces based on star charts, and some of the most difficult works in the repertory. The three books of Études by György Ligeti (1985, 1988–94, 1995) are perhaps closest to the old tradition in that they too concentrate each on a particular technique. Kaikhosru Shapurji Sorabji's 100 Transcendental Studies (1940–44), which take Godowsky and Liszt as their starting point, frequently focus on particular technical elements, as well as various rhythmical difficulties. William Bolcom was awarded the Pulitzer Prize for his Twelve New Etudes for Piano in 1988.

=== Cello ===
Out of all of the cello études ever made, the set of 40 etudes, Hohe Schule des Violoncello-Spiels ("High School of Cello Playing"), written by cellist and composer David Popper are arguably the most well known and widely used. Popper met with many of the famous composers at the time, such as Wagner, Berlioz, and Liszt in order to make studies that would help cellists play not only soloistic material, but orchestral material as well. The 19th étude, for example, is subtitled the "Lohengrin Etude", as it is written using music from Act Three, Scene Three of Wagner's Lohengrin (opera).

Following the creation of his High School of Cello Playing book, Popper created two more sets of études directed at more novice and intermediate audiences. The first, Zehn mittelschwere grosse Etüden; Als Vorstudien zur "Hohen Schule des Violoncellspieles" (10 Studies Preparatory to the "High School of Cello Playing"), was published a year later. This set of 10 études was aimed at intermediate players to study before working on the more advanced High School of Cello Playing book. Approximately five years later, Popper published his final set of études, 15 Leichte Etüden in der ersten Lage (15 Easy Etudes in the First Position). As the title states, this set of études was written so that the player could stay in first position, which makes it this set much more approachable to beginners.

== See also ==
- List of étude composers
- Music written in all 24 major and minor keys
- Invention (musical composition)
