= Saltarello =

Italian musical dance

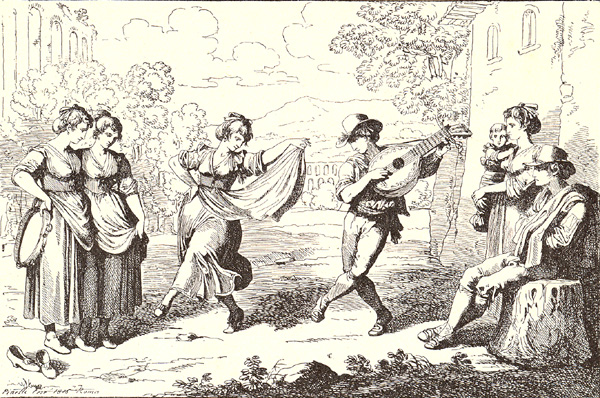
Saltarello. Illustration by Bartolomeo Pinelli.

The saltarello is a musical dance originally from Italy. The first mention of it is in Add MS 29987, a late-fourteenth- or early fifteenth-century manuscript of Tuscan origin, now in the British Library. It was usually played in a fast triple meter and is named for its peculiar leaping step, after the Italian verb saltare ("to jump"). This characteristic is also the basis of the German name Hoppertanz or Hupfertanz ("hopping dance"); other names include the French pas de Brabant and the Spanish alta or alta danza.

== History ==
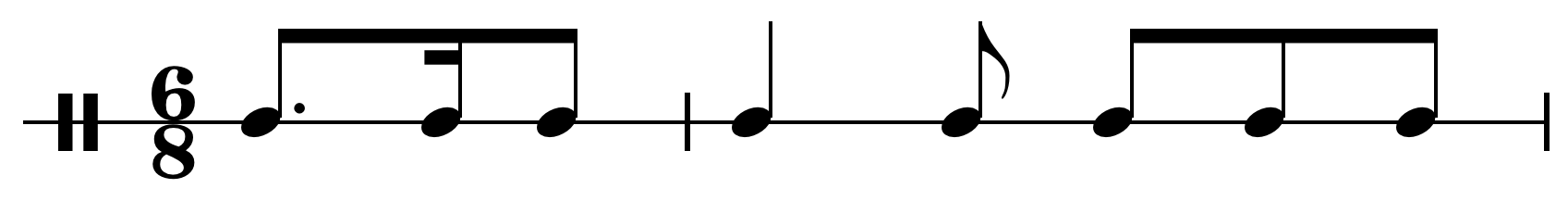
Saltarello rhythm

The saltarello enjoyed great popularity in the courts of medieval Europe. During the 14th century, the word saltarello became the name of a particular dance step (a double with a hop on the final or initial upbeat), and the name of a meter of music (a fast triple), both of which appear in many choreographed dances. Entire dances consisting of only the saltarello step and meter are described as being improvised dances in 15th-century Italian dance manuals. (The first dance treatise that dealt with the saltarello was the 1465 work of Antonio Cornazzano.) A clearer, detailed description of this step and meter appears in a 16th-century manuscript in Madrid's Academia de la Historia. During this era, the saltarello was danced by bands of courtesans dressed as men at masquerades.

The saltarello is one of four dance misure or rhythms at the time, the others being bassadanza, quadernaria, and piva. Each of the four misure corresponded to a time signature and its own step. Quadernaria was also known as saltarello tedesco (or "German" saltarello, after its rhythm), but experts believe it was rarely danced, unlike the other three misure.

In 1540, Hans Neusidler published an Italian dance under the name Hupff auff (introductory skip), and identified it with a parenthetical subtitle: "saltarella".

== As a folk dance ==
Although a Tuscan court dance in origin, the saltarello laziale became the typical Italian folk dance of Lazio and a favorite tradition of Rome in the Carnival and vintage festivities of Monte Testaccio. After witnessing the Roman Carnival of 1831, the German composer Felix Mendelssohn incorporated the dance into the finale of one of his masterpieces, the Italian Symphony. The only example of a saltarello in the North is saltarello romagnolo of Romagna.

The saltarello is still a popular folk dance played in the regions of southern-central Italy, such as Abruzzo, Molise (but in these two regions the name is feminine: Saltarella), Lazio and Marche. The dance is usually performed on the zampogna bagpipe or the organetto, a type of diatonic button accordion, and is accompanied by a tamburello or hand-drum.

== Medieval saltarelli ==
The principal source for the medieval Italian saltarello is the Tuscan manuscript Add MS 29987, dating from the late 14th or early 15th century and now in the British Library. The musical form of these four early saltarelli is similar to that of the estampie. However, they are in different metres: two are in senaria imperfecta, and two in quaternaria. No choreographies survive from before the 1430s, and it is not clear that these four dances have any relationship to later saltarelli.

== In classical music ==
A saltarello published by Giorgio Mainerio in 1578. Ernst Stolz plays the viol consort and the organ. The images are paintings by Tiziano.

- Tielman Susato included a saltarello in Het derde musikboexken: Danserye (1551).
- Joseph La Monaca "Saltarello" for solo piccolo and symphonic orchestra
- A lute piece entitled "Saltarello" is attributed to Vincenzo Galilei, written in the 16th century.
- Odoardo Barri: Six morceaux de salon, for alto-viola and piano (no. 6 is a saltarello)
- Felix Mendelssohn used the Saltarello for the fourth movement of his Symphony No. 4 "Italian".
- Fanny Hensel: Il saltarello romano, for piano, Op. 6, No. 4
- Charles-Valentin Alkan wrote a "Saltarelle" Op. 23, and in the final movement of his Sonate de Concert Op. 47 for piano and cello, "Finale alla Saltarella".
- Berlioz used a saltarello in the Carnival scene of Benvenuto Cellini which was reprised in the Roman Carnival Overture.
- Joachim Raff: Saltarello, for piano, Op. 108
- Charles Gounod: Saltarello for orchestra
- Camille Saint-Saëns: Saltarelle, for men's choir, Op. 74
- Camille Saint-Saëns: the last movement of the Piano Concerto No. 2, Op. 22 is a Saltarelle
- Eugène Ketterer: Saltarelle, for piano, Op. 266
- Daniel van Goens: Saltarello for cello and piano, Op. 35
- Ernst Haberbier: Saltarello for piano. Op. 54
- Max Mayer: Fünf Klavierstücke, Op. 6 (no. 3 is "Alla saltarello")
- F. Laurent-Rollandez: Saltarello for piano, Op. 18
- Franz Ries: Nocturne et Saltarello, for violin and piano
- S. B. Mills: Saltarello, for piano, Op. 26
- Bernhard Molique: Saltarella, for violin and piano, Op. 55
- H. T. Manicus: Saltarello, for piano
- George Grothe: Saltarello Galop, for piano
- Emil Kronke: Saltarello, for piano, Op. 32
- George Frederick Bristow: Saltarello, for piano
- August Marten: 4 Charakterstücke for violin and piano, Op. 8 (no. 2 is a saltarello)
- Georg Goltermann: Saltarello, for cello and piano, Op. 59, No. 2
- Gustav Satter: Saltarello, for piano, Op. 147
- Gabriel Verdalle: Salatarello for solo harp, Op. 23
- One of Frank Bridge's Miniatures for Piano Trio is a saltarello (No 5)
- Jean Antiga: Saltarello: danse italienne, for piano
- George Enescu: Nocturne et Saltarello, for cello and piano
- Theodor Kullak: Saltarello di Roma, for piano, Op. 49
- Carl Gottschalksen: Saltarello: Sorento ved Napoli: Italiensk Suite 3, for piano
- Edward German: Saltarello, for flute or piccolo and piano
- Anton Strelezki: Saltarello, danza napolitana, for piano, Op. 18
- Henri Piccolini: Saltarello one-step, for orchestra
- Sydney Smith: Saltarello, for piano four-hands
- Jules Demersseman: Solo de Concert, Op. 82 No. 6 for flute and piano. The closing movement is entitled "Saltarello"
- Leonardo De Lorenzo: Saltarello, for flute, op. 27
- Paul Mason: Saltarello, for piano
- Émile-Robert Blanchet: Saltarello, for piano
- Anton Schmoll: Saltarello, for piano, Op. 50, No. 19
- Jeraldine Saunders Herbison: Saltarello, for cello and piano, Op. 30, no. 2
- Maurice Jean Baptiste Ghislain Guillaume: Capriccietto, Canzona, and Saltarello, for clarinet and piano, Op. 23
- Guido Papini: Saltarello (Souvenir de Sorrento), for violin and piano, Op. 55, No. 2
- Charles Robert Yuille-Smith: Saltarello, for cello and piano
- Adolf Terschak: Saltarella for flute, 'cello, piano, Op. 20
- Charles Spinks: Dance Suite, for piano, Op. 12 (the second movement is a saltarello)
- Bernard Wagenaar: Saltarello for piano
- Germain Digmeloff: Pour un anniversaire: Saltarello
- Kris Dorsey: Shanty Saltarello (What Can You Do with a Drunken Sailor?), for brass quintet
- Malcolm Forsyth: Saltarello for brass quintet
- Robert Planel: Prélude et saltarelle, for alto saxophone and piano
- Lauren Bernofsky: Saltarello for C (or E♭) trumpet and piano
- Jean-François Michel: Intrada, canzonetta e saltarello, for B♭ cornet or trumpet and piano
- Antonius Streichardt: Saltarello, for Zupforchester
- Germaine Tailleferre: String Quartet (third movement)
