= Jean-Philippe Collard =

French pianist

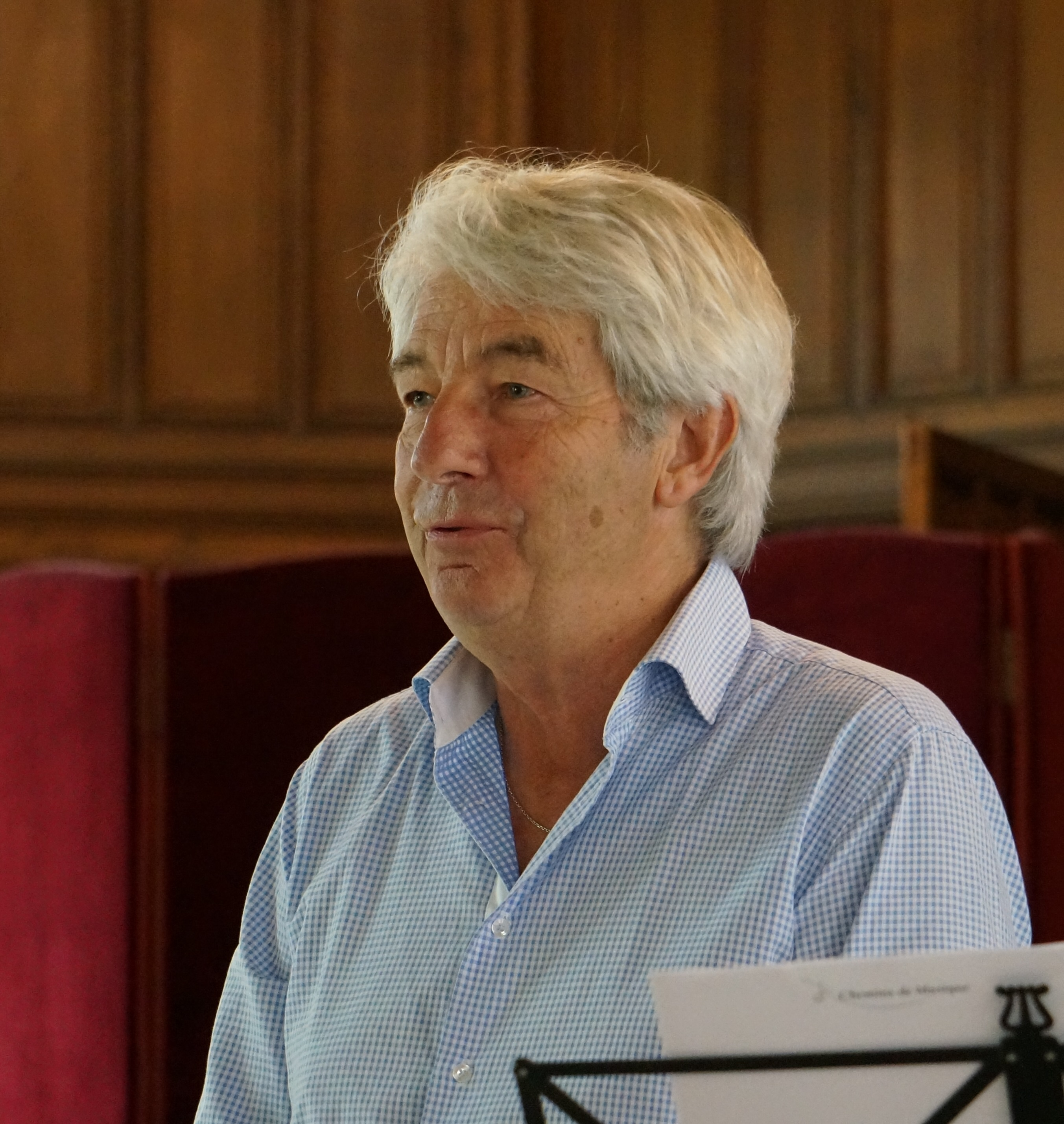
Collard at the Flâneries musicales, Reims (6 June 2014)

Jean-Philippe Henri Collard (born 27 January 1948) is a French pianist known for his interpretations of the works of Gabriel Fauré and Camille Saint-Saëns.

== Career ==
Collard was born on 27 January 1948 in Mareuil-sur-Ay, Marne, into a musical family. He started playing the piano at age five. In 1960 he traveled to Berlin having been sent by the Jeunesses musicales de France to compete in the International Competition for young pianists. At 16 he won First Prize at the Paris Conservatory of Music. He is also a winner of the Gabriel Fauré Award. In addition, Collard has won a First Prize from the Marguerite Long-Jacques Thibaud Competition, the Albert Roussel Award and the Cziffra International Competition.

In 1973 he played his recital debut in Paris at the Théâtre des Champs-Élysées. Critics in Paris were very enthusiastic. "He has all the right qualities which make him a musician of the highest order; his technique, his sensibility are like the flower of virtuosity" -- Le Figaro, February 1973.

He is considered one of the greatest exponents of the French school. Collard made his American debut in 1973 with the San Francisco Symphony Orchestra, conducted by Seiji Ozawa. The performance was praised by the San Francisco Chronicle.

A prolific recording artist with more than thirty titles to his credit, Collard's discography includes Fauré's complete solo piano music and chamber music with piano, Rachmaninov's Études-Tableaux and the Brahms Hungarian Dances (with pianist Michel Beroff), both named Stereo Review's Record of the Year in their respective years; the Ravel concerti with Lorin Maazel and the Orchestre National de France, cited by Gramophone magazine as Best Concerto Recording; and the Chausson Concert, Op. 21 (with Augustin Dumay and the Muir String Quartet) which won the Grand Prix du Disque. He has recorded all five Saint-Saëns piano concerti with André Previn and the Royal Philharmonic Orchestra, and the first recordings of Mozart's arrangements of the six French melodies with baritone José van Dam. Other recordings include a disc of Chopin's Ballades and his third sonata, and a Liszt recital disc including the B minor sonata.

He is the Artistic Director of the Flâneries musicales de Reims.

== Personal life ==
Collard lives in Paris with his wife and five children.

He was appointed a Chevalier of the Legion of Honour in January 2003.
