= Piano Concerto No. 3 (Ries) =

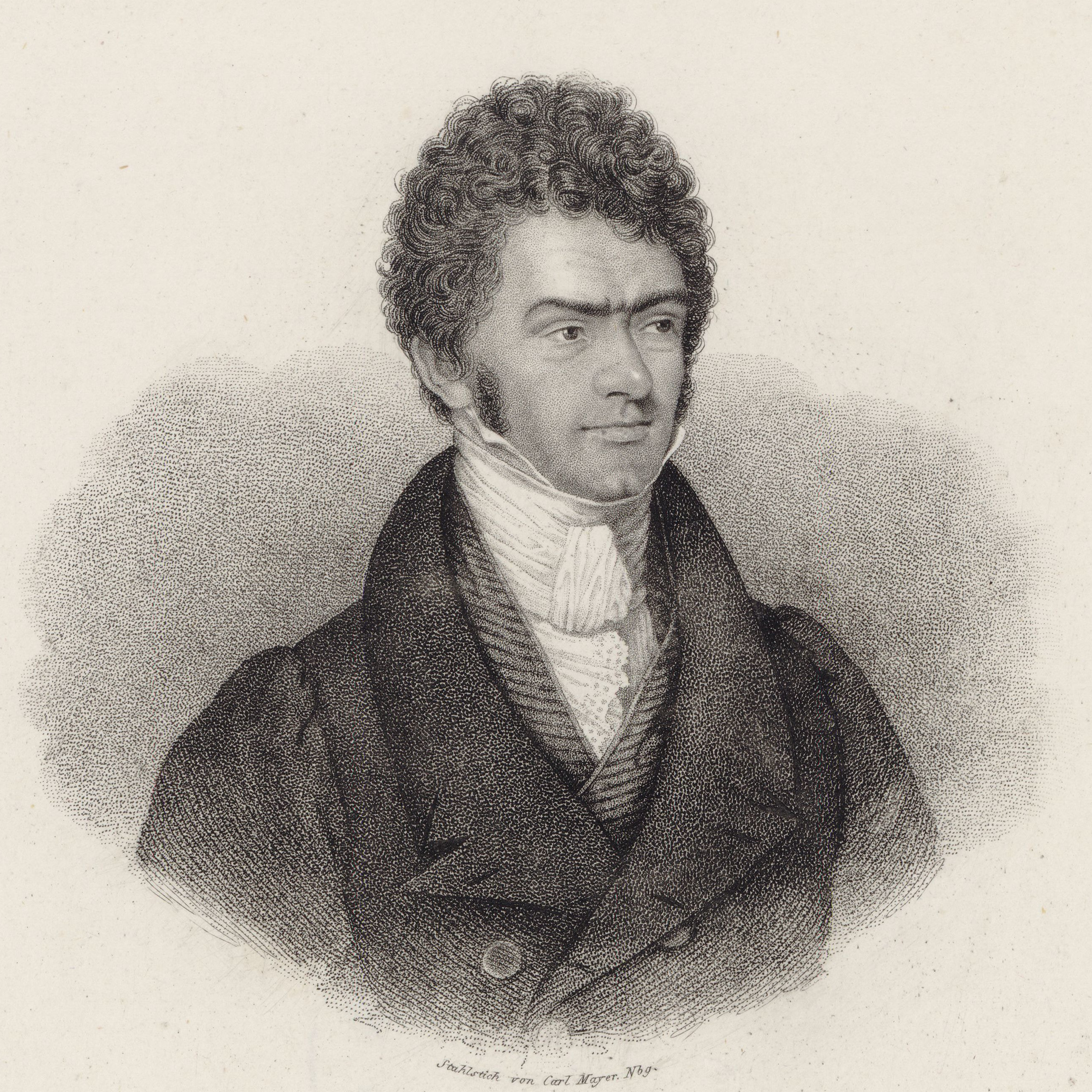
Ferdinand Ries

Piano Concerto No. 3 in C♯ minor, Op. 55, by German composer Ferdinand Ries was written around 1813. It was composed in the proto-Romantic style, similar to the concertos of Johann Nepomuk Hummel, and anticipates stylistic developments of future Romantic composers.

== History ==
The manuscript bears the notation "St. Petersburg 1812", suggesting it was begun there (Note: But the work may not have been finished there.). In any case, it was probably (Note: According to Allan Badley.) begun in 1812 and finished later, and most likely the fifth of Ries's eight piano concertos to be written. (Note: Concerto no. 3 refers to the order of publication, not composition, and likewise for all of Ries's concertos.)

The concerto was not published until 1815, when it was published by N. Simrock in Bonn with a dedication to Muzio Clementi.

== Connection to Franz Liszt ==
This piece, according to the diary of Adam Liszt, father of Franz Liszt, was the piano piece being played by Adam which "completely absorbed" Franz in his "sixth year"; following this he incessantly begged to be taught the piano.

== Movements ==
This work follows the traditional three-movement structure:

1. Allegro maestoso
2. Larghetto – (attacca)
3. Rondo: Allegretto

The first movement bears a strong resemblance to the music of period composers such as J. N. Hummel, John Field, or Friedrich Kalkbrenner. The second theme is in A♭ major (the dominant major enharmonic to G♯) rather than the expected E major. The second movement, in A major, anticipates the stylistic idiom of the music of Frédéric Chopin. The third movement, a fast 2/4, begins deceptively in C♯ major, but actually its home key is in C♯ minor, in which key the movement (and the work) ends.

== Recordings ==
Notable recordings of this composition include:

Pianist	Conductor	Orchestra	Record Company	Year of Recording	Format
Felicja Blumental	Theodore Guschlbauer	Salzburg Chamber Orchestra	Brana Records	1968	CD
Maria Littauer	Alois Springer	Hamburg Symphony Orchestra	Vox	1972	CD
Christopher Hinterhuber	Uwe Grodd	Gävle Symphony Orchestra	Naxos	2006	CD
