= Julius Goltermann =

German cellist and music professor

- Born: Johann August Julius Goltermann; July 15, 1825; Hamburg, Germany
- Died: April 4, 1876 (aged 50); Stuttgart, Germany
- Occupations: Cellist, professor

Julius Goltermann should not be confused with Georg Goltermann (1824–1898), the composer of eight cello concertos.

Johann August Julius Goltermann (15 July 1825 – 4 April 1876) was a 19th-century German cellist and music professor.

== Life and career ==
Julius Goltermann was born in Hamburg, Germany on 15 July 1825. He studied cello with Friedrich August Kummer in Dresden before holding a professorship of cello at the Prague Conservatory from 1850 to 1862 – there he taught the cellist David Popper. Between 1862 and 1870 he was a member of the court band at Stuttgart. He retired in 1870.

== Death ==
He died in Stuttgart, Germany on 4 April 1876 aged 50.
