= Eric Lamb =

Eric Lamb may refer to:

- Eric III of Denmark (c. 1120–1146), or Eric III Lamb, King of Denmark from 1137 until 1146
- Eric Lamb (musician) (born 1978), American flutist
