= Cello étude =

A cello étude (or study) is a piece of music written for the solo cello that zeroes in on specific techniques. Cello études are most often written by cellists to help other cellists improve their playing ability. Music that is written for performance generally does not focus on instrumental technique. Performance music is written to convey a certain sound, mood, set of emotions or ideas.

Some cello etudes, while focusing on cello techniques, also focus on musical ideas. Some rise to the level of performance pieces. However, it is rare to find cello etudes programmed in recital.

The last set of cello etudes which had such universal cellistic appeal was the "High School of Cello Playing" written by David Popper (1843–1913). His etudes are widely considered a pre-requisite to becoming a professional cellist.

There are several other composers whose cello etudes are widely studied by cellists. These composers include Dotzauer, Duport, Piatti, Lee, Merk, Grűtzmacher, and Franchomme. The first cello etudes appear to have been written in the eighteenth century by contemporaries of Mozart and Beethoven. Clearly, the cello etude has a long and distinguished history. With the recent success of the "Ten American Cello Etudes" of Aaron Minsky, this genre of music appears to enter into a new acceptance in the concert world.
