= Ten American Cello Etudes =

Ten American Cello Etudes is the first set of cello études of Aaron Minsky published by Oxford University Press. The set was published in 1988, making this the first set of cello études in a modern American style to be published by a major publisher. The last famous set of cello etudes to be published were the David Popper "High School of Cello Playing" which were published almost a hundred years previously.

In the introduction to "Ten American Cello Etudes", Minsky speaks about how in the past composers were able to bend music in order to reflect their time period and country. He argues that certain instruments like the guitar and bass were able to make the transition into modern popular music while the cello was assigned a "dignified yet restricted" role. It was his goal to write cello music that would teach other cellists how to bring the cello into all of the currents of modern popular music. Indeed, Minsky's etudes include the following genres: rock n' roll, blues, Latin, folk, country, hard rock, experimental, American waltz. They do provide a blueprint for a new style of cello playing.

Since publication, "Ten American Cello Etudes" have been performed around the world. They are in the curricula of the Associated Board of the Royal Schools of Music (U.K.), the American String Teachers Association, and others. They have been recorded by Lawrence Stomberg, professor of cello, University of Delaware (U.S.), and David Johnstone, principal cellist of the Sarasate Symphony (Spain). A recording of some of the pieces was made by Sebastian Comberti (U.K.) for the Associated Board. Jeffrey Solow, chair of the Department of Instrumental Studies at Temple University (Pennsylvania), and editor of The Violoncello Society Newsletter (New York), included "Ten American Cello Etudes" in his published list of "standard cello repertoire."
