= Eric Lamb (musician) =

American flutist (born 1978)

Eric Lamb (born 1978) is an American flutist and Altus performing artist who performs and teaches across the United States and Europe.

== Education ==
Lamb received a flute performance degree from the Oberlin Conservatory of Music in 2000, where he studied with Michel Debost. Following this, he studied with Thaddeus Watson at the Hochschule für Musik Frankfurt am Main, where he received a Master's of Orchestral Performance and a Soloist's Diploma. The Soloist's Diploma is Germany's most prestigious music degree. Additionally he trained in Italy with Chiara Tonelli at the Sculoa di Musica di Fiesole.

== Performance ==
Lamb was a core member of the International Contemporary Ensemble (ICE), based out of New York and Chicago. The new music group premiers works and performs innovative concerts in nontraditional venues. Lamb has premiered over 200 works with the ensemble and has worked in depth with composers Michel van der Aa, John Adams, Marc-Andres Dalbavie, Reinbert de Leeuw, George E. Lewis, Nico Muhly, Matthias Pintscher, and Kaija Saariaho. He has collaborated with conductors Pierre Laurent-Aimard, Vladamir Ashkenazy, Pablo Heras-Casado, Susanna Mälkki, Ludovic Morlot, and Steven Schick. Lamb joined ICE in 2008 after many years of working with co-flutist and founder Claire Chase. The two flutists frequently perform as a duo. In 2012, they were both soloists in the premier of Salvatore Sciarrino’s “Cerchio Tagliato dei Suoni” for four soloists with one hundred flutes at the Guggenheim Museum in New York.

Lamb is a founding member of the Vienna-based group Ensemble Paladino, a flexible chamber music group dedicated to vibrant programming, educational concerts, and composer workshops.

Lamb is a member of the Chamber Soloists of Detroit. He has also performed with Alarm Will Sound, American Contemporary Music Ensemble, ASKO/Schönberg Ensemble, Chamber Opera Orchestra of Frankfurt, the Chicago Composer's Orchestra, the City of Birmingham Orchestra, the City of Giessen Orchestra, the Cologne Chamber Ensemble, Ensemble Labortorium Basel, Ensemble Recherche, the HR Radio Orchestra Frankfurt, the Michigan Philharmonic, Orquestra Experimental de Amazonas Filarmônica, the Plymouth Canton Symphony Orchestra, Polish Kammerphilharmonie, the Slee Sinfonietta, and the Sphinx Symphony Orchestra.

== Teaching ==
While maintaining an active performance career, Lamb frequently presents workshops, master classes, and lectures regarding flute technique and repertoire, careers, 20th and 21st century compositions, and extended woodwind performance practice. He has been an artist in residence at Academie für Musik Wiesbaden, Bowling Green University, the Conservatoire Nationale de Musique et Danse La Rochelle, Eastern Michigan University, Northwestern University, Smith College, the University of Auckland NZ, University of South Carolina, and the University of Virginia.

== Awards ==
Millennium Young Artists’ Award from the James Tatum Foundation of the Arts
National John Philip Sousa Award
Dean’s Talent Scholarship from Oberlin College
2003 International Music Competition “Pacem in Terris” finalist
2004 First Prize Polytechnische Gesellschaft Chamber Music Competition
2006 First Prize Lenzewski Music Competition
2006 First Prize German Academic Exchange Performing Arts Competition
2006 DAAD Prize of the Hochschule für Musik und Darstellende Kunst Frankfurt

== Discography ==
Lamb's debut recording, with cellist Martin Rummel, was released in February 2013:

bach (re) inventions vol. 1 (2013, Paladino Music)

Lamb's recordings with the International Contemporary Ensemble:

Iannis Xenakis (2013, Mode Records)
Afterglow (2013, Mode Records)
The Bright and Hollow Sky (2011, New Focus Recordings)
Sonic Eclipse (2011, Kairos)
Son of Chamber Symphony/String Quartet (2011, Nonesuch)
Music of Arlene Sierra, Vol. 1 (2011, Bridge Records)
Someone Will Take Care of Me (2010, New Amsterdam Records)
Enter Houses of (2009, Tzadik Records)
Undersong (2008, Mode Records)
Huang Ruo, Chamber Concerto Cycle (2007, NAXOS)

Lamb's recording as soloist:

Johann Joachim Quantz: Solo Flute Music (2015, Paladino Music)
