= Michel Debost =

French flutist (1934–2026)

Background information
- Born: 20 January 1934; Paris, France
- Died: 2 May 2026 (aged 92) Levallois, Paris, France
- Genres: Classical
- Occupations: Musician, professor
- Instrument: Flute

Michel Debost (French: [dəbɔst]; 20 January 1934 – 2 May 2026) was a French flutist.

== Life and career ==
Born in Paris, he was one of the well known flutists of the French school. He studied under Gaston Crunelle and Marcel Moyse.

Debost won major international competitions. He received first prize at the International Competition in Geneva, as well as at the Prague Spring Festival and the Moscow Festival Competition, and he was awarded second prize at the International Competition in Munich. He was Principal Flute in the Orchestre de Paris from its creation in 1967 until 1989. He replaced Jean-Pierre Rampal as Professor of flute at the Conservatoire de Paris. Debost recorded much flute repertoire on LPs and CD. For several decades, he lived in the United States with his wife Kathleen Chastain, who is also a flutist. He taught at the Oberlin Conservatory of Music in Ohio from 1989–2011.

Debost died in Paris on 2 May 2026, at the age of 92.

== Notable students of Debost ==
1. Emmanuel Pahud – international soloist, principal flute Berliner Philharmoniker
2. Leone Buyse – professor at Rice University (ret.)
3. Claire Chase – international soloist, professor at Harvard University
4. Molly Barth – former member of eighth blackbird, professor at Vanderbilt University
5. Brandon Patrick George – member of Imani Winds
6. Eric Lamb – member of International Contemporary Ensemble

== Discography ==
1. CONCERTOS POUR FLUTE - CONCERTO POUR FLUTE & HARPE, Mozart. (Michel Debost Flute, Lily Laskine harp, Orchestre de Chambre de Moscou/Rudolf Barshai)
2. ENTR'ACTE (MUSIC FOR FLUTE AND HARP) Ibert, Berlioz, Faure, Gaubert, Debussy, Ravel
3. FLUTE PANORAMA, NO.1 (Faulisi) Widor, Reinecke, Gaubert, Karg-Elert, Faure
4. FLUTE PANORAMA, NO. 2 (Faulisi) Poulenc, Ibert, Sancan, Dutilleux, Messiaen
5. FLUTE PANORAMA, NO. 3 (Faulisi) Faure, Enesco, Casella, Gaubert, Ganne, Gaubert, Taffanel, Perilhou, Busser
6. FLUTE PANORAMA, NO. 4
7. TELEMANN, SIX SONATAS, OP. 2 Sonatas for 2 flutes, with James Galway, cassette only

== Bibliography ==
- Michel Debost, The Simple Flute: From A to Z, (translated from French), Oxford University Press, 2002, 282 pages
