= Anton Träg =

Anton Träg (11 June 1819 – 7 July 1860) was an Austrian cellist and composer.

== Life ==
Träg was born in Schwechat, and studied with Joseph Merk at the Conservatory of the Gesellschaft der Musikfreunde in Vienna. He was a teacher at Prague Conservatory from 1845 to 1852. He appeared in Prague as a soloist, and in chamber ensembles with Johann Král, Bedřich Smetana, Otto von Königslöw and others.

From 1851 he was a member of the Vienna Philharmonic; in Vienna he took part in musical soirées of Johann Baptist Streicher and Eduard Seuffert. He died in 1860, leaving a wife and son.

Träg was said to have an accomplished technique, with which he combined a deeply-felt delivery and strong resonant tone.

== Compositions ==
He wrote several works for cello, and a Concertino for cello and orchestra.
