= Graham Whettam =

English composer (1927–2007)

- Born: 7 September 1927
- Died: 17 August 2007 (aged 79)
- Occupation: Composer

Graham Whettam (7 September 1927 – 17 August 2007) was an English post-romantic composer.

== Biography ==
Whettam was born in Swindon, Wiltshire, and studied at St Luke's College, Exeter.

Though he never formally studied at a music school and was largely self-taught, several of his compositions had already been performed by major orchestras and soloists by his twenties. These include the Sinfonietta for Strings in 1951 at Kensington Palace; the Symphony No. 1 in the early 1950s by the Bournemouth Symphony Orchestra conducted by Charles Groves; the Concertino for oboe and string orchestra at the 1953 Proms performed by oboist Léon Goossens; and the Viola Concerto in 1954 at the Cheltenham Festival by violist Harry Danks and conductor Sir John Barbirolli. Other of his works had already been performed with the City of Birmingham Symphony Orchestra and the London Symphony Orchestra by conductors Basil Cameron, Meredith Davies, Sir Eugene Goossens, Willem van Otterloo, and Sir Malcolm Sargent, and by oboist Janet Craxton, clarinettist Jack Brymer, and horn player Dennis Brain. In 1959, the premiere of his first clarinet concerto was performed by Raymond Carpenter and the Bournemouth Symphony Orchestra conducted by Sir Charles Groves; this he considered his first mature work.

He was married to Rosemary Atkinson from 1948 until their divorce in 1958, at which time he moved to Coventry. While there, he married Janet Lawrence in 1959, and later founded and directed his own publishing company, "Meriden Music". In 1962 he wrote his first work to be critically considered a "masterpiece", Sinfonia contra timore (Symphony Against Fear), which was premiered three years later by the City of Birmingham Symphony Orchestra and conductor Hugo Rignold. Though Sinfonietta Stravagante (1964), performed by the Netherlands Philharmonic Orchestra and conductor Hubert Soudant, and Sinfonia Concertante (1966), performed by the Northern Sinfonia and conductor Bryden Thomson, followed in rapid succession, Whettam did not continue to have the success of his youth; several of his works were premiered/published some time after their composition (cf. below), and some of his later works (such as the Promethean Symphony and the Symphony No. 5) still wait for a world premiere.

Regarded as "a natural symphonist" by the Sunday Times, the dozen symphonies he composed between his mid-twenties and death form the core of Whettam's output. However, he also contributed some large-scale concertos, several shorter orchestral (both symphonic and concertante) works, numerous chamber and instrumental works (such as four string quartets and three solo violin sonatas), as well as vocal and choral works. His music, labelled as "invariably dramatic" (a characterization reflected in his titles: Sinfonia Drammatica; Concerto Drammatico; Concerto Ardente; Sinfonia Intrepida), features skillful construction and a deep sense of poignancy and atmosphere.

In 1994 Whettam moved with his wife Janet to Woolaston in Gloucestershire where he continued to compose and where he died on 17 August 2007, aged 79.

== Works ==
=== Symphonies ===
Several of Whettam's symphonies have never been published and others were premiered/published many years after their compositions, causing numbering inversions/omissions in past chronologies. The following list tries to restore chronological order:

- Sinfonietta for Strings (premiered in 1951 at Kensington Palace)
- Symphony No. 1 (early 1950s). 28'
- Sinfonia contra timore (Symphony Against Fear) (1962; rev. and publ. 1997). 27'
- Sinfonietta (Sinfonia) Stravagante (1964). 20'
- Sinfonia Concertante for small orchestra (1966). 22'
- Sinfonia Intrepida (sometimes listed as "No. 2") (1976). 44'
- Sinfonia Drammatica (sometimes listed as "No. 3") (1978). 29'
- Sinfonia Prometeica (Promethean Symphony) (1999). 40' - a movement can be performed separately as God of Fire : Introduction and Scherzo-Fuocoso
- Symphony "No. 5" for small orchestra (2001). 28'
- Symphony "No. 6" (listed as "in progress" in a 2001 article; possibly unfinished at the composer's death in 2007)

=== Other Symphonic Works ===
- Introduction and Scherzo-Impetuoso Benvenuto Cellini (1960; rev. 1982). 9'
- The Masque of the Red Death, ballet, after Edgar Allan Poe (1968)
- Concerto Conciso for string orchestra (1981). 15'
- An English Suite for orchestra (1984)
- Symphonic Prelude (1985). 11'
- Evocations, symphonic suite in three movements (1995). 17' - slow movement can be performed separately as Idyll
- God of Fire, Introduction and Scherzo-Fuocoso (1998). 9' - from the Promethean Symphony
- Threnos-Hymnos, for string orchestra (1999). 9' - based on the Hymnos String Quartet (1997) and incorporating an earlier Hymnos for string Orchestra (or for eight cellos) from 1978

=== Concertante works ===
- Concerto Scherzoso for harmonica and orchestra, op. 9 (1951). 9' - written for Larry Adler
- Concertino for oboe and string orchestra, op. 12 (performed at the 1953 Proms by Léon Goossens)). 9'
- Fantasy for harmonica and orchestra (1953) - written for Tommy Reilly
- Viola Concerto, op. 16 (premiered in 1954 at the Cheltentham Festival performed by Harry Danks and conducted by John Barbirolli)
- Clarinet Concerto No. 1, for clarinet and symphony orchestra (1959; rev. 2001). 23'
- Variations on an Original Theme for oboe and strings (1961). 11'
- Concerto for harmonica and orchestra No. 2, op. 34 (1961) - written for Tommy Reilly
- Clarinet Concerto No. 2, for clarinet and string orchestra (1982). 24'
- Idyll, for flute, horn, harp and strings (1983). 7' - slow movement of the symphonic suite Evocations
- Concerto Ardente for horn and strings (1992). 23'
- Les Roseaux au Vent, Triple Concerto (Introduction, Theme and 10 Variations) for two oboes, English horn (or bassoon) and strings (1993). 17'
- Ballade Hébraïque for violin (or viola, or cello) and orchestra (1994; premiered in 2000). 13' - orig. for violin (or viola, or cello) and piano (1981)
- Concerto Drammatico for cello and orchestra (1998; revised and expanded version of an earlier Cello Concerto from 1962). (premiered in 2000 by Martin Rummel) 33'

=== Vocal and Choral Works ===
- Three Romantic Songs for medium/high voice and piano (1956; rev. 1998). 8'
- Two Casimir Songs for medium/high voice and piano (1958; rev. 1998). 6'
- Missa Brevis for S.A.T.B. choir and organ (1963). 11'
- The Chef who Wanted to Rule the World for choir and chamber orchestra (1969)
- Celebration for choir, brass, percussion and organ (1975)
- On the Beach at Night (after Walt Whitman), for mixed voices a cappella (1979). 9'
- Consecration for large choir, brass, timpani, percussion and organ (1982). 9'
- A Mass for Canterbury for S.A.T.B. choir a cappella with optional organ interlude (1986). 22'
- Three Shakespearian Elegies for S.A.T.B. choir a cappella (1994). 9'30
- Four Yeats Songs (from The Rose) for medium/high voice and piano (2002). 12'

=== Chamber music ===
- Prelude, Allegro and Postlude for Flute, Oboe and Piano (1955). 7'
- Fantasy for Ten Wind Instruments (1960; rev. and expanded in 1979). 7'
- String Quartet No. 1 (1960–67). 24'
- Duo Declamando for Horn and Piano (1972). 10'
- Oboe Quartet No. 2 The Bagpiper (1973). 18'
- A Little Suite for Brass Quintet (2 Trumpets, Horn, Trombone and Tuba) (1974). 6'
- Trio for Oboe, Clarinet and Bassoon (1975). 14'
- Horn Trio, for Horn, Violin and Piano (1976). 18'
- Quintetto Concertato for Flute, Oboe, Clarinet, Bassoon and Horn (1979). 15'
- Concerto for Ten Wind Instruments (1979). 16'
- String Quartet No. 3 (1980). 30'
- Serenade for Viola (or Alto Flute, or English Horn, or Clarinet) and Guitar (1981). 12'
- Ballade Hébraïque for violin (or viola, or cello) and piano (1981). 12' - also version for violin (or viola, or cello) and orchestra (1994)
- Idyll, for Horn and Organ (1983). 7' - transcription of the homonymous work for flute, horn, harp and strings
- Quartet for Four Horns (1986). 18'
- Canticles for Horn Quartet and Organ (1987). 10'
- Sonata for Clarinet and Piano (1988). 14'
- Concerto for Brass Quintet (2 Trumpets, Horn, Trombone and Tuba) (1993). 16'
- Romanza [No. 1] for viola solo (1993)
- Hymnos String Quartet (1997). 28' - revised version of the earlier String Quartet No. 2
- Romanza No. 2 for viola solo (2000)
- String Quartet No. 4 (1997; premiered in 2001). 25'
- Sextet for Wing Quintet and Piano (2001). 24'

=== Works for solo instruments ===
- Fantasy for piano four hands (1956; rev. 2005). 6'
- Sonata for solo Violin No. 1 (1957; rev. 1986). 12'
- Vier Spielmusiken for stradella-accordion (1957)
- Partita for solo Organ (1962). 18'
- Prelude, Scherzo and Elegy for solo Piano (1964). 11'
- Triptych for solo Organ (1966). 14'
- Prelude and Scherzo-Impetuoso for solo Piano (1967). 10'
- Night Music, Sonata for solo Piano (1968). 25'
- Sonata for solo Violin No. 2 (1972). 21'
- Improvisations for solo Clarinet (1979). 12'
- Suite for Timpani : Five Pieces for Four Drums (1982). 18'
- Lento and Fugue for solo Marimba (1985). 10' - transcription of the last two movements of the Sonata for solo Violin No. 2 (1972)
- Adagietto for solo Organ (1986). 4'
- Sonata for solo Violin No. 3 (1989). 28'
- Partita for solo Guitar (1990). 27'
- Sonata for solo Cello (1990). 22'
- Romanza (No. 1) for solo Violin (1993). 7'
- Chaconne for solo Violin (1996). 10'
- Sonata for solo Marimba (1998). 24'
- Romanza No. 2 for solo Violin (2000). 6'
- Ballade Hébraïque, version for piano four hands (2005). 11' - orig. for violin (or viola, or cello) and piano (1981)

== Recordings ==
- Complete Cello Works. paladino music PMR0041, 2017
- Sinfonia Intrepida. Redcliffe Recordings RR016, 2001
- Concerto Drammatico for cello and orchestra; Sinfonia contra timore. Redcliffe Recordings RR017, 2001
- Piano Music : Night Music (Sonata); Prelude, Scherzo and Elegy; Prelude and Scherzo-Impetuoso; Ballade Hebraique for piano 4 hands; Fantasy for piano 4 hands. Divine Art CD, 2006
- String Quartets No. 1 & No. 4; Oboe Quartet No. 2. Carducci Classics CSQ5847, 2008
- Concerto Scherzoso for harmonica and orchestra; Concertino for oboe and string orchestra. Sinetone AMR CD, 2012

== Sources ==
- Graham Whettam's page on Meriden Music
