= Auckland Choral =

Choir in Auckland

- Choir
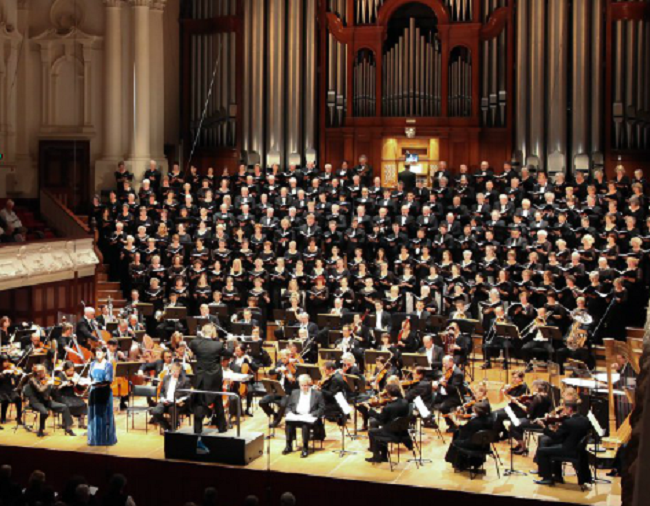
- Performing with Auckland Philharmonia at the Auckland Town Hall, 2015
- Former name: Auckland Choral Society
- Origin: Founded 1855; incorporated society established 1914
- Founded: 1855; 171 years ago
- Music director: Uwe Grodd
- Headquarters: Auckland, New Zealand
- Affiliation: New Zealand Choral Federation
- Associated groups: Auckland Philharmonia; Piper's Sinfonia
- Website: www.aucklandchoral.com
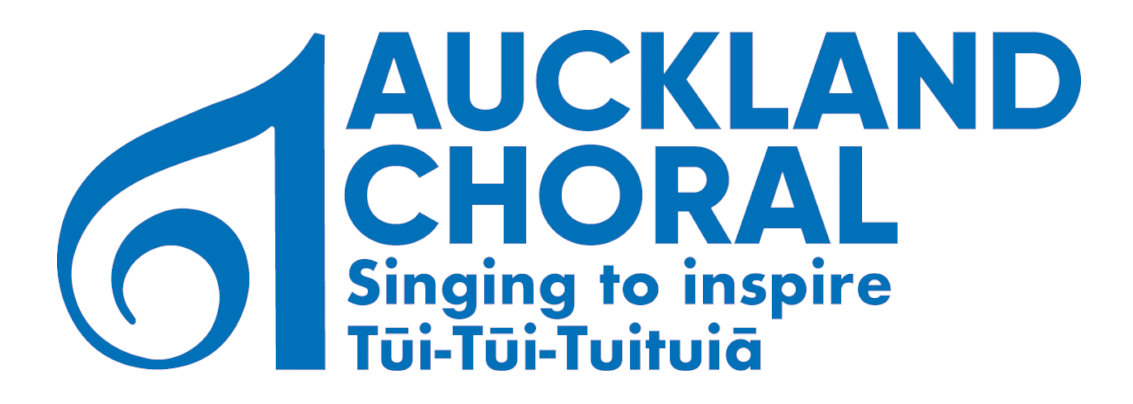

Auckland Choral (formally the Auckland Choral Society Incorporated) is a symphonic choir based in Auckland, New Zealand. It is New Zealand's oldest surviving arts organisation, and Auckland's only symphonic-scale choir, founded in 1855 and established as an incorporated society in 1914. Auckland Choral celebrated its 150th anniversary in November 2005 with a choral piece written especially for the choir by New Zealand composer David Hamilton. In 2015, Auckland Choral celebrated its 160th anniversary. The choir's current music director is Professor Uwe Grodd.

== Auckland Choral profile ==
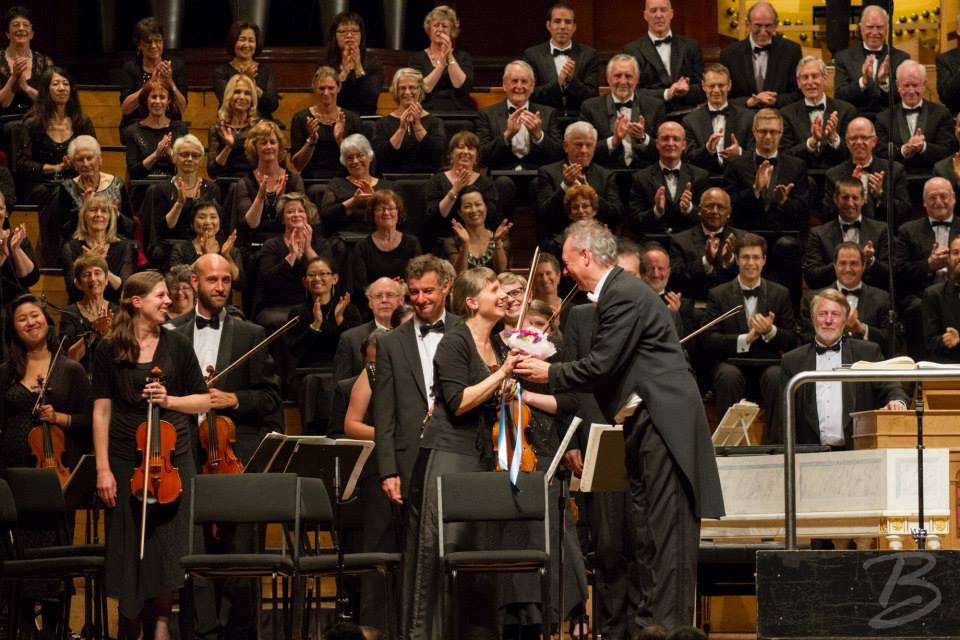
Conductor Uwe Grodd with Auckland Choral

Auckland Choral is a symphonic-scale choir of 100+ voices. It is Auckland's oldest and most prominent choir, and continues to play a significant role in Auckland's arts scene today. Its members are wide-ranging in age and cultural and professional background. Members rehearse weekly throughout the year and the choir regularly accepts new members following a thorough audition process. The current music director is Professor Uwe Grodd.

Auckland Choral sings a wide variety of works from the choral canon. Notable recent performances include Beethoven's Missa Solemnis, Paul Winter's Missa Gaia and Handel's Israel in Egypt.

Auckland Choral sings in locations around Auckland, including the Auckland Town Hall and the Holy Trinity Cathedral in Parnell. The choir frequently collaborates with orchestras from the Auckland region, including the Auckland Philharmonia Orchestra and Piper's Sinfonia.

== Auckland Choral and Handel's Messiah ==
The choir is well known for its annual Christmas performances of Handel's Messiah. In 2018, Auckland Choral marked the milestone of 100 consecutive annual Christmas performances of Messiah. Auckland Choral sang its first full performance of Messiah on 17 December 1857 at the Mechanics’ Institute Hall in Auckland. This is believed to have been the first performance of the oratorio in Australasia. Auckland Choral's initial run of consecutive annual performances was interrupted only in 1918, when the outbreak of the 1918 flu pandemic in New Zealand led to a prohibition on public gatherings.

== Auckland Choral Foundation ==
In 2007, the Auckland Choral Foundation was established as a charitable trust to ensure the long-term success of Auckland Choral, by providing capital growth and income to support its operation and activities.
