= Alberto Mesirca =

Italian guitarist

Alberto Mesirca (1984) is a guitarist from Italy.

Grandson of the Paduan writer Giuseppe Mesirca, winner of the Campiello Prize, he graduated at the Conservatory of Castelfranco Veneto (teacher: Granfranco Volpato) with the highest score and honor mention; successively he made his Konzert-Examen at the Musikakademie of Kassel (teacher: Wolfgang Lendle), ending it with honor mention.

He won the “Golden Guitar” at the International Guitar Meeting of Alessandria, “Pittaluga” (member of the WFIMC) in 2007 for best recording if the year (“Ikonostas”, M.A.P.), in 2009 for “Best Upcoming Artist of the Year” and in 2013 for Best Recording of the Year (“British Guitar Music”, Paladino Music OG). He was nominated “Young Artist of the Year” at the Festival of Aalborg, Denmark, and “Rising Star” at the Festival “Gitarre Wien” in Vienna. The composers Leo Brouwer, Dusan Bogdanovic, Angelo Gilardino, Mario Pagotto dedicated to him some of their compositions, and he made the premiere recordings of works by Giulio Regondi, Claudio Ambrosini, Ivan Fedele, Carlo Boccadoro, Frantz Casséus (in collaboration with Marc Ribot).

He regularly performs with Vladimir Mendelssohn, Domenico Nordio, Martin Rummel, Daniel Rowland. He was nominated responsible of the musical archive of the National Library of Istanbul. In 2010, during the ceremonies for the 500th Anniversary of death of Giorgione, he published for the first time the previously unknown Fantasias by Francesco Canova da Milano, taken from the 1565 Giovanni Pacalono Lute Manuscript. The compositions have been chosen as permanent musical installation at the Giorgione Museum.
