= Norman Shetler =

American puppeteer and pianist (1931–2024)

Norman Shetler (16 June 1931 – 25 June 2024) was an American-born pianist, puppeteer, puppet constructor and piano professor who lived most of his adult life in Austria.

== Life and career ==
Norman Shetler was born in Dubuque, Iowa, on 16 June 1931.

While a student in Vienna, the Soviet Union funded his participation in the first Tchaikovsky Competition. There he met Van Cliburn. He also dreamed of studying with the Soviet virtuoso Sviatoslav Richter.

In 1955 he moved to Vienna, Austria, where he studied piano, graduating in 1959. In the same year, he was awarded a second prize at the ARD International Music Competition. He specialized in accompanying singers, having worked with Anneliese Rothenberger, Peter Schreier, Dietrich Fischer-Dieskau, Brigitte Fassbaender, Hermann Prey, Margaret Price and Thomas Quasthoff, and also with instrumentalists such as violinist Nathan Milstein and cellist Heinrich Schiff. Despite specializing in accompanying, he was also a soloist. He was recorded over 70 times.

Between 1983 and 1991, Shetler taught Piano and Lied Accompaniment at the Würzburg School of Music and Drama. Beginning in 1992, he was a professor at the University of Music and Performing Arts in Vienna. He also taught masterclasses, particularly at the Mozarteum University of Salzburg.

Shetler was also a puppet maker and puppeteer beginning no later than 1985. His show "Musical Puppet Cabaret" toured internationally, in festivals and on television.

Shetler died on 25 June 2024, at the age of 93.

== Discography ==
- Franz Schubert: Winterreise D 911 (arr. Rummel) - Xaver Hutter, narrator; Martin Rummel, cello - paladino music pmr 0018 (2011)
