= Karl Leopold Böhm =

Karl Leopold Böhm (also Carl Leopold Böhm, Leopold Karl Böhm; 4 November 1806 – 2 October 1859) was an Austrian cellist.

== Life ==
Böhm was born in Vienna, son of a businessman, and he was intended to follow in the business. Showing musical ability, he studied at the Conservatory of the Gesellschaft der Musikfreunde in Vienna, with Joseph Merk and Karl Gottfried Salzmann. Aged 18 he appeared in concert in Prague, Budapest and other cities; returning to Vienna, he joined the orchestra of the Theater in der Josefstadt.

In 1828 he joined, as solo cellist, the court orchestra of Prince Fürstenberg at Schloss Donaueschingen, directed by Jan Kalivoda; when the orchestra was disbanded in 1848, he remained there in a chamber ensemble. During the summer he appeared as soloist in Germany, Switzerland and France.

Böhm was an occasional composer of works for the cello.
