= Uwe Grodd =

German conductor and flautist (born 1958)

- Born: 26 November 1958 (age 67); Stuttgart, Germany
- Occupations: conductor and flautist

Uwe Grodd (born 26 November 1958 in Stuttgart) is a German conductor and flautist, currently living in Auckland (New Zealand).

He has performed and recorded internationally for over 25 years. Grodd conducted the gala opening night of the Handel Festival in Halle, Germany, of 2003 with "Le Choeur des Musiciens du Louvre" from Grenoble followed by a highly successful season of Händel's rediscovered opera, Imeneo in the Halle Opera House. His appointment to conduct the Auckland Choral Society (Auckland Choral) was confirmed at Holy Trinity Cathedral, Auckland, on 28 September 2008, in a concert that concluded with Anton Bruckner's Locus iste, Handel's Coronation Anthems and "David Roi".

Grodd was professor of classical performance at the University of Auckland from 1984 to 2018.

== Discography ==
- Joseph Haydn: Trios for flute, cello and piano Hob. XV:15–17 – Christopher Hinterhuber, piano; Martin Rummel, cello – Naxos 8.572667 (2011)
