= Jacques Franco-Mendès =

Dutch cellist and composer

Jacques Franco-Mendès (1816 – 22 August 1889) was a Dutch cellist and composer.

== Life ==
He was born in Amsterdam in 1816, to a Portuguese Jewish family. Aged 13, he studied in Vienna with the cellist Joseph Merk. He performed in London in 1831 with his brother Joseph Franco Mendes, a violinist, in a concert given by Johann Nepomuk Hummel. He was afterwards appointed chamber cellist to King William II of the Netherlands; in 1834 he became royal solo cellist.

In 1833 he and his brother gave concerts in cities in Germany, and in 1836 they performed in Paris. Joseph died in 1841; affected by the loss, for several years afterwards he gave concerts only in the Netherlands. In 1845 he took part in the festival in Bonn celebrating the unveiling of the Beethoven Memorial.

In 1860 Franco-Mendès settled in Paris, where he gave concerts; he died there on 22 August 1889.

== Compositions ==
Franco-Mendès composed pieces for cello and piano, and a Grand Duo for two cellos; also two string quintets and a string quartet.
