= Georg Goltermann =

German cellist, composer and conductor

Georg Eduard Goltermann should not be confused with Julius Goltermann (1825–1876), the cello teacher of David Popper.

Georg Eduard Goltermann (19 August 1824 – 29 December 1898) was a German cellist, composer and conductor.

== Life ==
Goltermann was born in Hannover. His father was an organist, and therefore he got an early introduction to music. He received cello lessons from Joseph Menter in Munich, the most important Bavarian cello virtuoso of his time. He took composition lessons from Ignaz Lachner. He also learned to conduct.

In 1852, after briefly touring Europe as a solo cellist, he became music director in Würzburg. In 1853 he accepted an offer to become deputy music director of the municipal theater Stadttheater in Frankfurt am Main, where he was promoted to Kapellmeister (principal music director) in 1874. He died in Frankfurt am Main.

== Works ==
Some of Goltermann's works were very popular at the time and are still used for teaching purposes. Goltermann composed eight cello concertos, of which the fourth is the most famous. This "student's concerto" is the easiest of his first five concertos, and it is studied fairly widely. His music is rarely performed in professional concerts. It is deemed to lack the musicality of true concertos, and though it has been praised for its melodious and pleasant nature, it is not considered inspired. Instead his concertos are studied by students to learn technique and get a basic understanding of concerto style. Concerto No. 1 has maintained a presence in today's standard repertoire. The slow movement entitled Cantilena was often played separately as a cello solo. An early recording of this movement played by Pablo Casals exists. All 8 concertos are for cello and orchestra, though the orchestral parts can be difficult to find now.

- Concerto No. 1 in A minor, Op. 14
- Concerto No. 2 in D minor, Op. 30
- Concerto No. 3 in B minor, Op. 51
- Concerto No. 4 in G major, Op. 65
- Concerto No. 5 in D minor, Op. 76
- Concerto No. 6 in D major, Op. 100
- Concerto No. 7 in C major, Op. 103
- Concerto No. 8 in A major, Op. 130

There are other works for orchestra including a symphony in A, Op. 20, published by Breitkopf & Härtel in 1852 and released in 2023 on the Capriccio label.

Many of Goltermann's shorter works for cello are in the lower and medium technical difficulty level.

- Nocturne in D minor for cello and piano, Op. 43, No. 3
- Nocturne in G major for cello and piano, Op. 49, No. 1
- Nocturne in G major for cello and piano, Op. 54, No. 1
- Nocturne in B minor for cello and piano, Op. 59, No. 1
- Nocturne in E minor for cello and piano, Op. 92, No. 1
- 3 Romances sans paroles for solo cello, Op. 90
- La Foi for cello and piano, Op. 95, No. 1
- 2 Duos en forme de sonate, Opp. 15 and 25.

=== Concerto No. 4 in G major ===
The fourth cello concerto is often performed by students due to its relative ease of play. It is divided into three movements:

1. Allegro (G major)
2. Andantino (B minor—B major—B minor)
3. Allegro Molto (G major)
