= Félix Battanchon =

French cellist and composer

Félix Battanchon (9 April 1814 – 1893) was a French cellist, composer, and one of the venerated teachers at the Paris Conservatory.

== Life ==
He studied at the Conservatory with Olive Charlier Vaslin (1794–1889) and Louis Pierre Martin Norblin (1781–1854). In 1840 he entered the orchestra of the Grand Opéra. He applied for second teacher of cello in 1851. Little is known about his life until his death in Paris in 1893.

== Selected works ==
Battanchon wrote some sixty compositions, mainly salon pieces and studies for cello.

Orchestral

- An-Ini-Goz, Fantaisie caractéristique sur des airs bretons in D minor for 2 violins, viola, cello and double bass, Op. 14
- Ronde des veilleurs de nuit for chamber orchestra, Op. 48 (1885)

Concertante

- Concerto No. 1 in E minor for cello and orchestra, Op. 20
- Caprice in E minor for cello and orchestra (or piano), Op. 28

Chamber music

- 2 Mélodies for cello and piano, Op. 3
- Souvenir de la Sérénade de Beethoven for cello and piano, Op. 8
- Une Barcarolle et deux romances sans paroles for cello and piano, Op. 9
- 25 Préludes dédiés aux artistes for cello solo, Op. 10
- Une Sérénade et deux pensées fugitives for cello and piano, Op. 11
- Solo de Concert in D major for cello and string quartet (or orchestra, or piano), Op. 12
- 3 Duos dédiés aux Amateurs for 2 cellos, Op. 15
- Rêverie for cello and piano, Op. 16
- 6 Duettinos faciles et progressifs for 2 cellos, Op. 18
- Chants du Soir, Trio for cello with viola and double bass, Op. 19
- Fantaisie sur un thème de Beethoven for cello and string quintet (or piano), Op. 22 (1862)
- Souvenir d'un bal, Fantaisie for cello and piano, Op. 23
- Élégie in G major for cello and piano, Op. 24
- Valse brillante in A major for cello and piano, Op. 26
- La Primavera, Pastorale for cello and piano, Op. 27
- Pensées des champs for cello and piano, Op. 29 (1863)
- 3 Duos for 2 cellos, Op. 31
- Les Regrets, 2 Rêveries for cello and piano, Op. 32 (1867)
- Réminiscences de Beethoven, Caprice for cello and string quartet (or piano), Op. 33
- 2 Romances sans paroles (2 Songs Without Words) for cello and piano, Op. 34
- Les Rêves dorés, 3 Pensées fugitives for cello and piano, Op. 35
- Boléro in E minor for cello and string quartet (or piano, or orchestra), Op. 36
- Trio No. 1 in G major for 3 cellos, Op. 38
- Sonata in G major for cello and piano; transcription of the Trio, Op. 38
- Souvenirs d'enfance, 3 Pieces for cello and piano, Op. 39
- Trio No. 2 in C minor for 3 cellos, Op. 40 (1869)
- Les matinées du printemps, Idylle for cello and piano, Op. 42
- Spanische Serenade, Duo for violin and cello, Op. 43 (1880)
- Gavotte dans le style ancien for cello or violin and piano, Op. 45
- Berceuse et chanson d'enfant for cello or violin and piano, Op. 46
- La Gioventu!, 3 Pièces for cello and piano, Op. 50
- Romance et scherzetto for cello or violin and piano, Op. 51 (published 1888)
- Barcarolle for cello and piano, Op. 52 (1887)
- Prière du matin for cello and piano, Op. 53 (1887)
- Élégie for cello or violin and piano, Op. 55 (1888)
- Dans les près, Chansonnette for cello (or violin, or oboe) and piano, Op. 57
- 3 Pièces mélodiques et faciles for cello or violin and piano (1891)

1. Souvenirs, Op. 60
2. Dis-moi pourquoi, Op. 61
3. Une nuit à Grenade, Op. 62

- 2 Pièces caractéristiques for cello or violin and piano (1892)

1. Le Rêve, Op. 63
2. Gavotte préférée, Op. 64

- 4 Pièces caractéristiques for cello solo (published 1895)

Pedigogical works for cello

- 3 Études en double cordes (3 Etudes in Double-Stopping), Op. 1 (1843?)
- 24 Études adoptées pour l'enseignment dans les classes du Conservatoire de Musique à Paris, Op. 4
- 6 Études-caprices, Op. 5
- 12 Pièces faciles ou petites études de style mélodique for 2 cellos, Op. 6
- 50 Études méthodiques for 2 cellos, Op. 7
- Études des doubles cordes (Etudes in Double-Stopping), 2 Thèmes variés en forme d'études, Op. 13
- 18 Études sur les compositions de J. Stiastny, Op. 21 (1862)
- 12 Études aux positions du pouce (12 Etudes in Thumb Position), Op. 25
- 6 Études artistiques, Op. 30 (1863)
- 12 Études dans le manche précedant les 12 études aux positions du pouce (12 Etudes on the Neck Preceding 12 Studies in Thumb Position), Op. 49 (published 1885)
- 6 Études sur des difficultés nouvelles (Etudes on New Challenges), Op. 56 (1888)

Piano

- 6 Pièces faciles et caractéristiques, Op. 54 (1887)

Vocal

- Le Rêve, Mélodie for baritone, cello and piano with chorus ad libitum, Op. 17 (1859)
