= Étude Op. 25, No. 11 (Chopin) =

Composition for piano by Frédédic Chopin

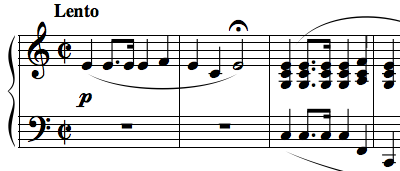
Beginning of the Étude Op. 25, No. 11

Étude Op. 25, No. 11 in A minor, often referred to as Winter Wind in English, is a solo piano technical etude composed by Frédéric Chopin in 1836. It was first published together with all études of Opus 25 in 1837, in France, Germany, and England. The first French edition indicates a common time signature, but the manuscript and the first German edition both feature cut time. The first four bars that characterize the melody were added just before publication at the advice of Charles A. Hoffmann, a friend. Winter Wind is considered one of the most difficult of Chopin's 24 études.

== Structure ==
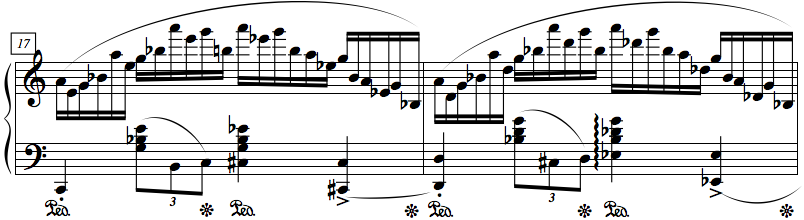
Characteristic semiquaver-tuplets that make up most of this étude

The étude is a study for developing stamina, dexterity, accuracy and technique – essential skills for any concert pianist. It begins with a piano (soft) introduction of the main melody. The first theme follows, consisting of tumultuous cascades of semiquaver-tuplets (sixteenth-note-tuplets) and a leaping figure for the left hand in the relative major, C major, which shortly segues into a repetition of the first theme. It finishes with a short development into a fortissimo coda, and ends with one final statement of the theme.

== Technique ==
Étude Op. 25, No. 11
Martha Goldstein (playing on an 1851 Érard)

Étude Op. 25, No. 11, is a study of right hand dexterity and left hand flexibility. Each hand has intense challenges, ranging from brilliant runs and multi-octave leaps to tricky articulations which must be phrased correctly so the melody becomes audible. Both hands play an important role throughout the piece; the melody is sung through the heavy left hand, and the right hand contributes the étude's namesake with rapid scales and arpeggios. This study must be navigated with polyphonic mindset, treating both hands as separate melodies that work together, in a duet for one performer.

One dissertation stresses the importance of implied melodic structure throughout the right-hand figures. Meaning, the following passage (measure 10, 11):

Should be played thus:

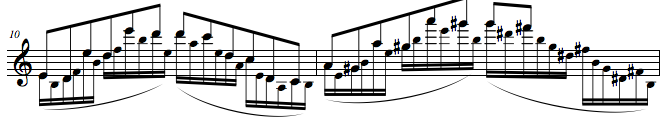

accentuating those notes indicated by additional quaver (eighth note) tails. This serves to emphasize the underlying quartal rhythm to further accentuate the march-like theme of the left-hand. Although this analysis may be sound, the performance of this without the aforementioned implications detracts nothing from the rhythmic undulations of the chromatic scales. Abby Whiteside agreed with this subdivision, calling them "tonal patterns which have to be solved before this Etude is playable." Citing her usual procedures of promoting arm strength, she emphasized two key points exemplified by this étude: "notewise procedure does not further bravura playing" and "finger technique is simply not adequate for brilliance and speed." Her dissertation states that this work is impossible without the aforementioned subdivision, and simultaneously advocates her arm technique.

== Legacy ==
The American music writer and critic James Huneker, in his preface to the Schirmer edition of Chopin's études, famously asserted of this étude, "Small-souled men, no matter how agile their fingers, should avoid it."
