= Sebastian Lee =

German cellist and pedagogue

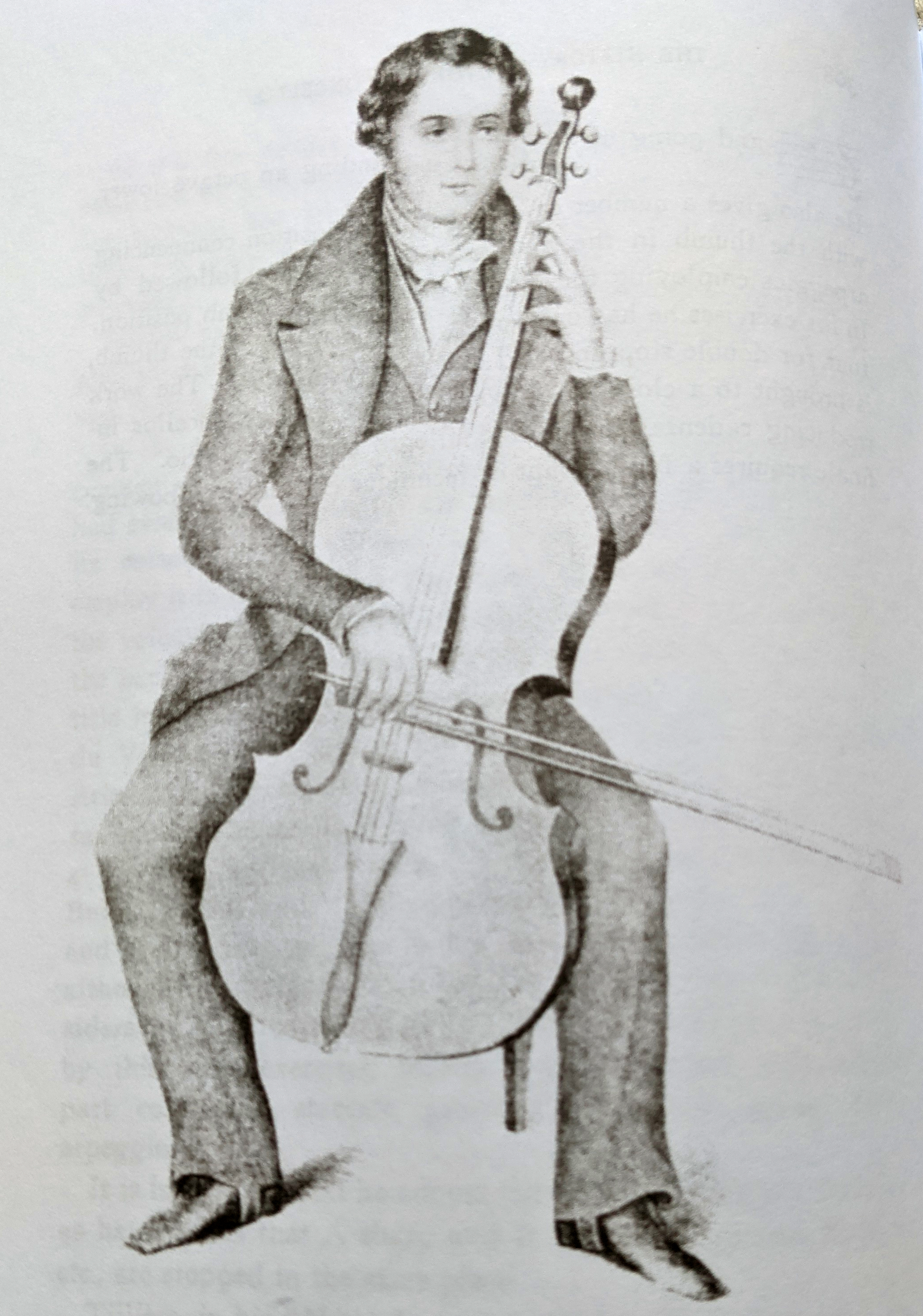
Sebastian Lee, 1843

Sebastian Lee (24 December 1805 – 4 January 1887) was a German cellist and pedagogue active in France and Germany.

== Biography ==
He studied under Johann Nikolaus Prell. In 1832, he debuted in the Theatre Italien in Paris. From 1837 to 1843, he was a soloist at the Paris Opéra. He also taught the cello at the Paris Conservatory until 1868, when he returned to his birthplace, Hamburg.

In both, his playing and teaching styles, he displayed a combination of the German and French schools. He published a method for the violoncello (Méthode pratique pour le violoncelle, Op. 30) in 1845, with the distinction of being accepted as a manual at the Paris Conservatory. The method has been republished in various countries and Lee's studies and duets are still used today.

He is most notable for the composition of an anthology of 40 cello études faciles (40 Easy Etudes for Violoncello, Opus 70).

He wrote a series of studies for cello, of which one in particular; Thema mit Variationen (theme with variations), has been called, "A study with a memorable melody".
