= Andrea Zani =

Italian composer (1696–1757)

Andrea Teodoro Zani (11 November 1696 – 28 September 1757) was an Italian violinist and composer.

== Life ==
Zani was born at Casalmaggiore in the Province of Cremona. He received his first instruction in playing the violin from his father, an amateur violinist. Subsequently, he received instruction in composition from Giacomo Civeri, a local musician, and studied violin in Guastalla with the court violinist Carlo Ricci. Antonio Caldara, who was working as Capellmeister at the court of Archduke Ferdinand Charles in Mantua, not far from Casalmaggiore, heard Zani play and invited him to accompany him to Vienna. Between 1727 and 1729 Zani arrived in Vienna and was active there as a violinist in the service of the Habsburgs. Following the death of his sponsor Caldara in 1736, he returned to Casalmaggiore where he remained for the rest of his life, except for occasional concert appearances. He died in his home town as the result of an accident, when the carriage in which he was travelling to Mantua overturned.

== Style and significance ==
Zani's works show the influence of Antonio Vivaldi, but are somewhat less sweeping. His op. 2, published in 1729, is of great historical importance because it is the earliest dated source of symphonies that present no ambiguities of genre. His late works clearly exhibit a casting off of baroque elements in favor of early classical ones.

== Compositions ==
- 12 Sonate da camera, op.1 (probably Casalmaggiore, 1727) (Reprinted in Paris as Sonates a violino solo e basso da camera, op. 3)
- Sei sinfonie da camera e altretanti concerti da chiesa a quattro strumenti, op. 2 (Casalmaggiore, 1729)
- Concerti Dodici a quattro con i suoi ripieni, op. 4 (Vienna, 1735)
- Sonate 12 a violino e basso intitolate "pensieri armonici", op. 5 (Vienna, 1735)
- Sonate a violino e basso, op. 6 (Paris, 1740)
- In addition, there are numerous manuscripts found in libraries scattered throughout Europe, including three concertos and one sonata for flute, at least twelve concertos for cello, six trio sonatas for two violins and continuo, as well as several violin concertos and symphonies.

== Sources ==
- Larue, Jan, and Eugene K. Wolf. "Symphony, §I: 18th century". Grove Music Online ed. L. Macy (Accessed 17 February 2007)
- Wolf, Eugene K. 2004, "Andrea Zani's sinfonie da camera, op. 2 (Casalmaggiore, 1729)". In Giovanni Battista Sammartini and His Musical Environment, Studi sulla storia della musica in Lombardia: Collana di testi musicologici 4, edited by Anna Cattoretti, 531–47. Turnhout: Brepols. ISBN 2-503-51233-X
