= Christopher Hinterhuber =

Austrian pianist (born 1973)

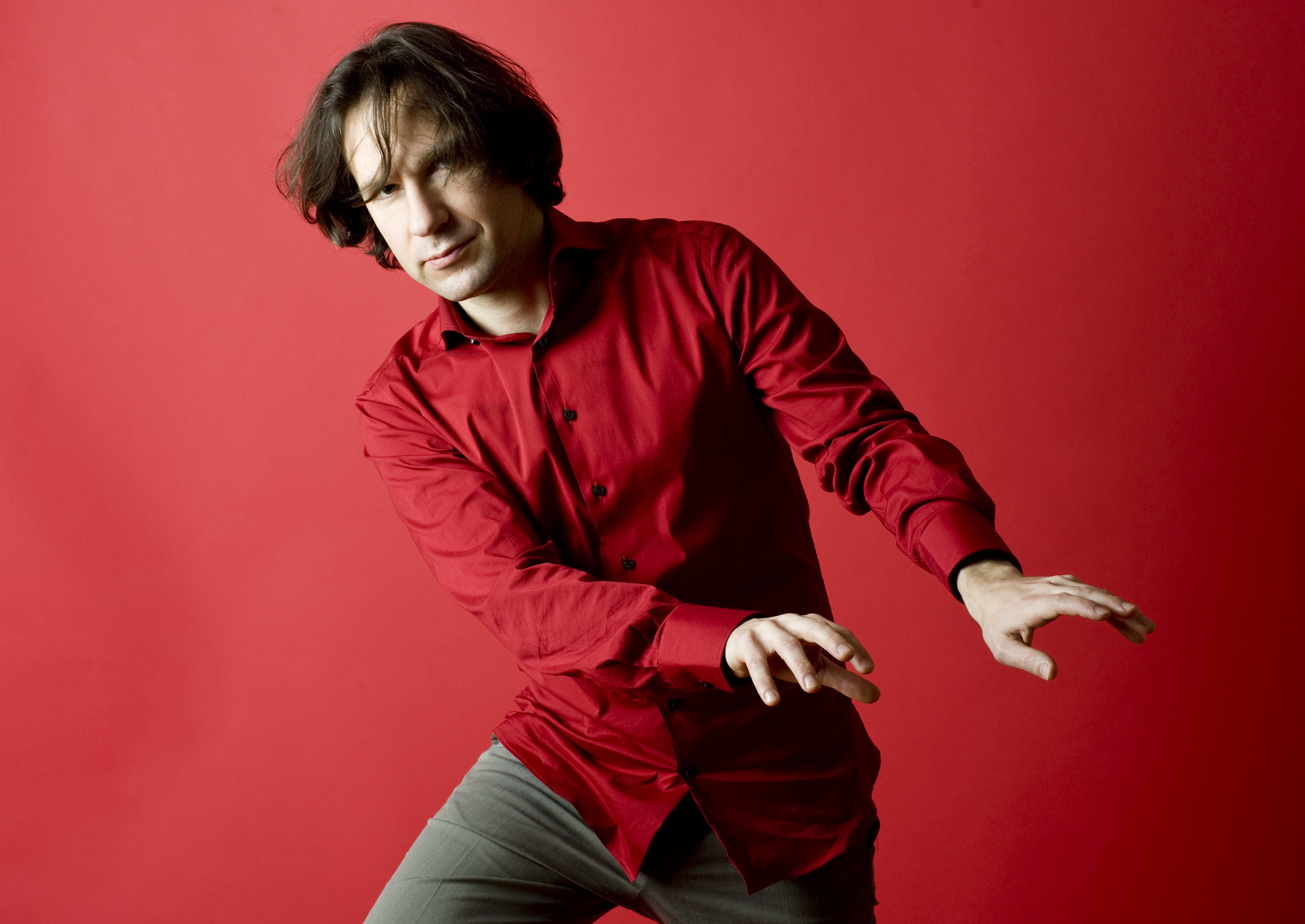
Christopher Hinterhuber in 2012

Christopher Hinterhuber (born 28 June 1973) is an Austrian classical pianist.

== Biography and career ==
Hinterhuber was born in Klagenfurt, Austria, and studied with Rudolf Kehrer and Heinz Medjimorec at the university for Music in Vienna, and with Lazar Berman at the Accademia Pianistica in Imola, Italy. He also attended master classes with Dmitri Bashkirov, Oleg Maisenberg, and Murray Perahia. In 2001, he won the second prize at the Beethoven Piano Competition in Vienna, Austria, and also performed in Michael Haneke's film The Piano Teacher (his musical performances and his hands were used in the film).

Since then, Hinterhuber has performed at Carnegie Hall, in New York, Wigmore Hall, in London, Concertgebouw, in Amsterdam, and in many other major venues. Hinterhuber has performed as a soloist and with orchestras, including the Wiener Symphoniker, the Staatskapelle Weimer, the Royal Liverpool Philharmonic, the Bournemouth Symphony Orchestra and many others. He has also collaborated with artists such as Vladimir Ashkenazy, Dennis Russell Davies, and Bertrand de Billy. Hinterhuber has performed chamber music with the Hugo Wolf Quartett, the Ysaye Quartet, Ernst Kovacic, Christian Altenburger, and many others. Hinterhuber has also performed in festivals in Salzburg, Prague, Vienna, Guadalajara and other locations.

Hinterhuber has made many recordings with the Naxos and Kalrec labels, performing works by Haydn, Ferdinand Ries, Schubert and Zemlinsky. A recording of works by Johann Nepomuk Hummel earned the Editors Choice award from Gramophone magazine in February, 2008.

Hinterhuber teaches piano at the University of Music and Performing Arts in Vienna.

== Discography ==
- Bach, C. P. E: Sonatas and Rondos Naxos 8.557450
- Instrumental Easy-Listening Piano Classics Schubert Naxos 8.578099-101 Instrumental
- Haydn, J.: Flute Trios Nos. 15–17 (Grodd, Rummel, Hinterhuber) Naxos 8.572667 Chamber Music
- Hummel: Oberons Zauberhorn / Variations on Das Fest der Handwerker / Le retour de Londres Naxos 8.557845 Concertos, Orchestral
- NAXOS 20th Anniversary Concert (NTSC) Naxos 2.110227 Classical Concert
- Ries, F.: Piano Concertos, Vol. 1 (Hinterhuber, Grodd) – Nos. 6 and 8, "Salut au Rhin" Naxos 8.557638 Concertos
- Ries, F.: Piano Concertos, Vol. 2 (Hinterhuber, Grodd) – No. 3 / Introduction and Polonaise / Variations on Swedish National Airs Naxos 8.557844 Concertos, Orchestral
- Ries, F.: Piano Concertos, Vol. 3 (Hinterhuber, Grodd) – No. 7 / Grand Variations on Rule Britannia / Introduction and Variations Brillantes Naxos 8.570440 Concertos, Orchestral
- Ries, F.: Piano Concertos, Vol. 4 (Hinterhuber, Grodd) – Nos. 4 and 5, "Pastoral" / Introduction and Rondeau Brilliant Naxos 8.572088 Concertos
- Schubert: Piano Works for Four Hands, Vol. 4 Naxos 8.555930 Instrumental
- Zemlinsky: Trio for Clarinet, Cello and Piano / Cello Sonata / 3 Pieces Naxos 8.570540 Chamber Music, Instrumental
- Wolfgang Amadeus Mozart, Johannes Brahms, Alexander von Zemlinsky: Clarinet Trios – Dimitri Ashkenazy, clarinet; Manuel Hofer, viola; Martin Rummel, cello – paladino music pmr 0005 (2011)
- The Original Debut Recording (Works by Bach, Haydn, Liszt, Stravinsky and Rachmaninoff) – paladino music pmr 0031 (2012)
- Johann Nepomuk Hummel: Cello Sonata op 104, Piano Sonata No 5 op 81, Flute Trio op 78 ("Schöne Minka") – Walter Auer, flute; Martin Rummel, cello – paladino music pmr 0019 (2012)
- Frederic Rzewski: "The People United Will Never Be Defeated", Johann Sebastian Bach: Aria variata – paladino music pmr 0037 (2012)
