= Friedrich August Kummer =

German musician (1797–1879)

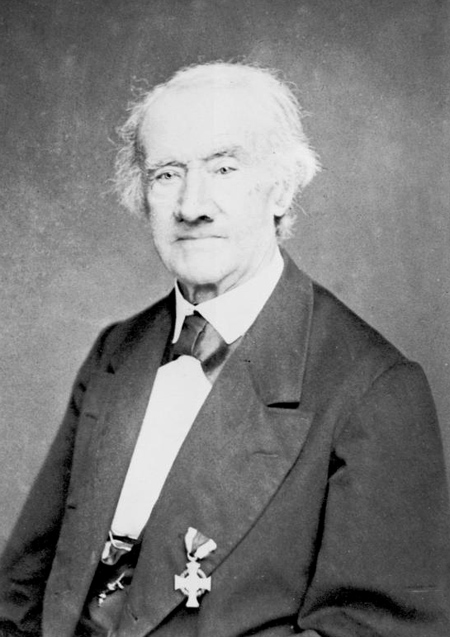

Friedrich August Kummer (5 August 1797 – 22 August 1879), born in Meiningen, the Holy Roman Empire, was a cellist, pedagogue, and composer.

== Childhood and education ==
As a child, his family moved to Dresden on an invitation by the court chapel to his father, an oboist. Kummer, initially an oboist, took an interest in the violoncello and studied with notable performers Friedrich Dotzauer and Bernhard Romberg.

== Career ==
In 1814 he was admitted into the Dresden chapel as an oboist, since there were no violoncello vacancies. In the same year Carl Maria von Weber appointed Kummer as a violoncellist at the Royal Opera House.

Kummer became an acclaimed performer and in 1850 he was appointed as the principal violoncellist at the court chapel after Dotzauer retired. Kummer himself retired in 1864. His son Friedrich Kummer was born in 1865.

=== Method ===
In 1839 Kummer wrote a method, Violoncelloschule für den ersten Unterricht (Violoncello School for Preliminary Instruction), Op. 60, for the violoncello which to this day remains very popular.

== Selected works ==
- 3 Duos concertans et brillans for violin and cello, Op.15
- 3 Duets for 2 cellos, Op.22
- Souvenir de la Suisse, Concertino for cello and orchestra or string quartet or piano, Op.30 (dedicated to Joseph Merk)
- Adagio et variations sur un thème de l'opéra "I Capuleti ed i Montecchi" de Bellini for cello and piano or string quartet, Op.31
- Duo facile sur des thèmes favoris de l'opéra "Les Huguenots" de Meyerbeer for cello or viola and piano, Op.34
- Pièce fantastique for cello and orchestra or string quartet or piano, Op.36 (1840)
- 8 grosse Etüden (8 Grand Studies) for cello (cello 2 ad lib.), Op.44
- Deux pièces pour les Amateurs de Piano et de Violoncelle, Op.46
- Amusements pour les amateurs de Pianoforte et de Violoncelle (ou Viola) sur des Motifs de l'Opéra "Au fidele Berger" d'Adolphe Adam, Op.53
- Anticipations de la russie, Grande fantaisie sur des thèmes nationaux russes for cello and orchestra, Op.56
- 10 Melodische Etüden (10 Melodious Studies) for cello (cello 2 ad lib.), Op.57
- 2 Duos de concert for violin and cello, Op.67
- Fantaisie sur les motifs de l'opéra "Lucia di Lammermoor" de G. Donizetti for cello or viola and piano, Op.68 (1841)
- Trois morceaux de salon sur des motifs de Henselt, Reissiger, Malibran for cello and piano, Op.69
- Réminiscences de l'opéra "La Favorite" de Donizetti, 2 Pieces for cello and piano, Op.70
- La Cantilena élégie for cello and piano, Op.72
- Concertino en forme d'une scène chantante for cello and piano, Op.73
- Reminiscenses des opéras de Rossini et de Bellini for violin or cello accompanied by string trio or piano, Op.74
- Introduction et polacca brillante, Concert Piece for cello and orchestra or string quartet or piano, Op.75
- Fantaisie sur des motifs de l'opéra Rienzi de Richard Wagner for cello and piano, Op.78
- 4 Morceaux de salon sur des airs nationaux italiens, ecossais, allemands et espagnols for cello and piano, Op.81
- 4 Duets for 2 cellos, Op.103
- 12 Duets for 2 cellos, Op.105
- Studien (Studies) for cello (cello 2 ad lib.), Op.106
- Cantilena ed Allegro moderato alla mazurka for cello and orchestra or string quartet or piano, Op.107
- Grazioso affettuoso for cello and piano, Op.108
- Les soirées du nord sur des airs russes et bohémiens, Fantaisies for cello and piano, Op.115
- Vier Salon-Stücke über Motive aus Rienzi, Holländer & Tannhäuser von Richard Wagner for cello and piano, Op. 119
- 60 Exercices journaliers (60 daily exercises), Op. 125
- 6 Duets for 2 cellos, Op.126
- Fantasie über Küchen's Lieder for cello and piano, Op.130
- Airs célèbres, Transcriptions for cello and piano, Op.142

No.4 Und ob die Wolke sie verhülle air de l'opéra "Der Freischütz" de Weber

- 6 Duets for 2 cellos, Op.156
