= Claire Chase =

American musician

- Born: 1978 (age 47–48); Leucadia, California, U.S.
- Genre: Classical
- Instrument: Flute
- Formerly of: International Contemporary Ensemble

Claire Chase (born 1978) is a solo flutist, collaborative artist, curator and advocate for new and experimental music. Chase has won the Avery Fisher Prize, which recognizes musical excellence, vision, and leadership. In 2012, Chase was awarded a MacArthur Fellowship—the so-called "genius" award.

== Early life and education ==
Chase was born in 1978 and grew up in Leucadia, California. She made her solo debut with the San Diego Symphony at age 14 in 1992.

While attending Oberlin College, where she studied with Michel Debost, she received the Theodore Presser Foundation Award in 1999 which she used to commission new compositions for the flute. She received her B.M. from Oberlin in 2001.

== Career ==
After graduating from Oberlin, Chase founded the International Contemporary Ensemble (ICE) in 2001, and was its Executive/Artistic Director until 2017.

After winning first prize in the Concert Artists Guild competition in 2008, she made her Carnegie Hall debut in 2010 at the Weill Recital Hall.

Chase has premiered over 100 new solo works for the flute that incorporate extended techniques and electro-acoustic elements. Her first solo album, Aliento was released in 2009 and was one of Time Out Chicago's Top 10 Classical Albums of 2009. Chase has performed world-wide as a soloist and chamber musician in venues including (Le) Poisson Rouge, Miller Theatre, and Lincoln Center for the Performing Arts in New York City, the John F. Kennedy Center for the Performing Arts in Washington D.C., the Isabella Stewart Gardner Museum in Boston, the Sibelius Academy in Helsinki, the Palacio de Bellas Artes in Mexico City.

Over the past decade, Claire Chase has premiered hundreds of new works for the flute in performances throughout the Americas, Europe, and Asia. She continues to champion new music throughout the world by building organizations, forming alliances, pioneering commissioning initiatives, and supporting educational programs that reach new audiences.

She began "Density 2036" in 2014, a 22-year project to commission a significant body of new music for the flute, culminating in the one-hundredth anniversary of Edgard Varèse's 1936 "Density 21.5".

In the fall of 2017 Chase was appointed Professor of the Practice in the Music Department at Harvard University.

Chase held the 2022–23 Richard and Barbara Debs Composer's Chair at Carnegie Hall.

== Discography ==
- Density 2036: parts v 2017-2018 (2020, Corbett vs. Dempsey Records)
- Density 2036: parts iv 2016 (2020, Corbett vs. Dempsey Records)
- Density 2036: parts iii 2015 (2020, Corbett vs. Dempsey Records)
- Density 2036: parts i & ii 2013-2104 (2020, Corbett vs. Dempsey Records)
- Density (2013, New Focus Recordings)
- Terrestre (2012, New Focus Recordings)
- Died in the Wool (2011, Samadhi Sound)
- Bright and Hollow Sky (2011, New Focus Recordings)
- Undersong (2011, Mode Records)
- Aliento (2009, New Focus Recordings)
- Enter Houses Of (2009, Tzadik Records)
- Complete Crumb Edition, Vol. 12 (2008, Bridge Records)

With John Zorn

- On the Torment of Saints, the Casting of Spells and the Evocation of Spirits (Tzadik, 2013)
- Fragmentations, Prayers and Interjections (Tzadik, 2014)

== Awards ==
- 2017 Avery Fisher Prize
- 2012 MacArthur Fellowship
- 2010 Carlos Surinach Prize
- 2008 First Prize Concert Artists Guild Competition
- 2001 First Prize National Young Artist Competition
- 1999 Theodore Presser Foundation Award
- 1996 Presidential Scholar Award from the National Foundation for Advancement in the Arts
- 1995 First Prize California Young Artists Competition
