= Arthur Bransby Burnand =

Arthur Bransby Burnand (Croydon 1859 -1907) was an English composer. He studied in Germany with Clara Schumann but settled in London. His songs and piano pieces were popular before World War I. His song "Dreams" was recorded by John McCormack.

Burnand commonly composed under the pseudonyms Anton Strelezki and Stepan Esipoff.
