= Joseph Merk =

Austrian cellist (1795–1852)

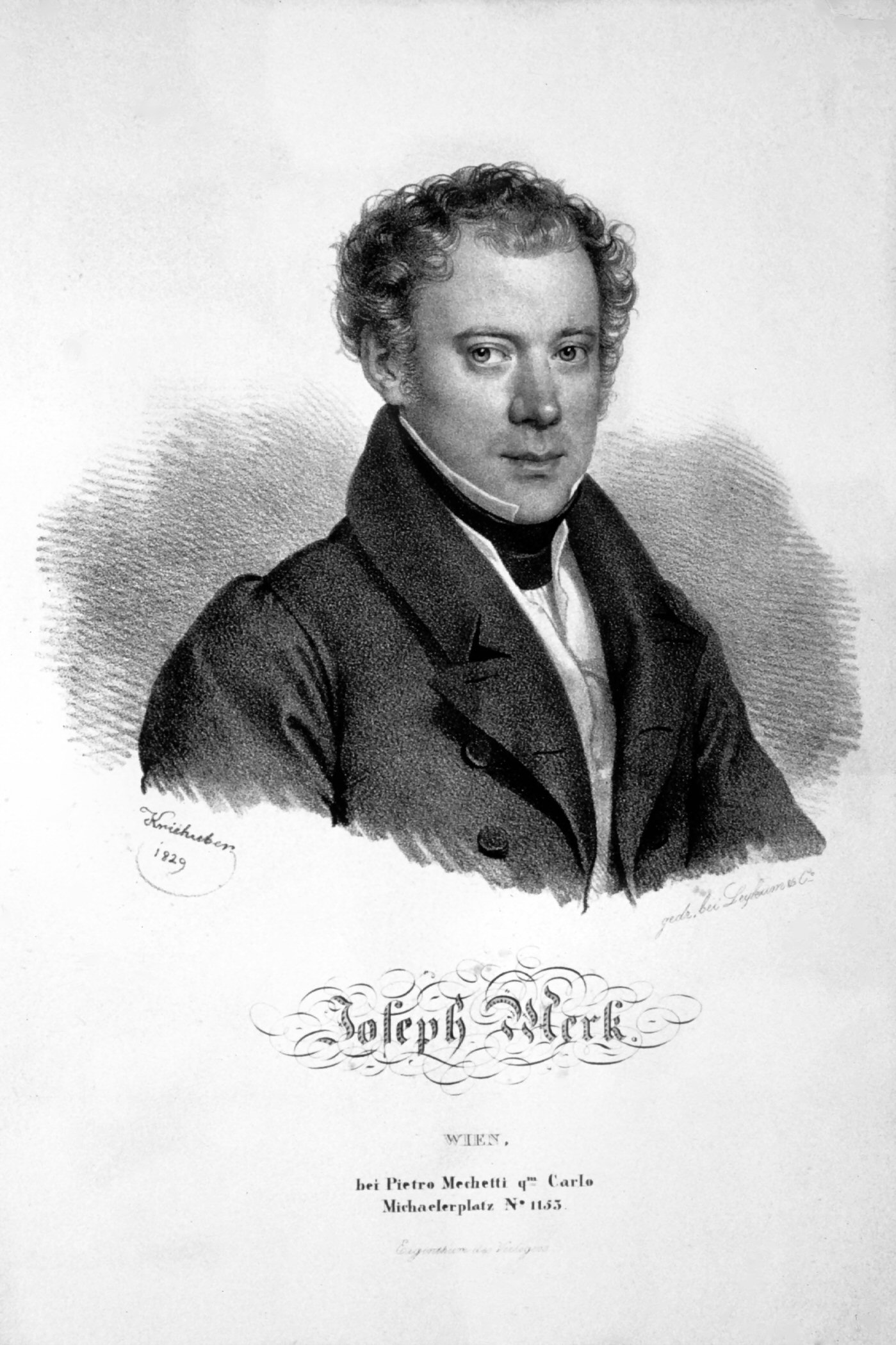
Joseph Merk

Joseph Merk (18 January 1795 – 16 July 1852) was a cellist from the Austrian Empire, often described as one of the most influential of the first half of the 19th century. He also wrote a number of compositions for the cello.

== Career ==
Joseph (or Josef) Merk was born in Vienna in 1795. He first studied singing, the guitar and the violin, but at the age of 15 he was bitten so severely on his left arm by a dog, that he could no longer play the violin adequately even after the wound had healed. He then turned to the cello and had lessons with the principal cellist of the Vienna Court Opera, Philipp Schindlöker (1753-1827), making such rapid progress that after only a year he was engaged by a Hungarian aristocrat to play in his string quartet, where he remained for two years.

In 1815 the guitarist Mauro Giuliani appeared with Joseph Merk, Johann Nepomuk Hummel and the violinist Joseph Mayseder in a series of chamber concerts in the botanical gardens of Schönbrunn Palace (dubbed the "Dukaten Concerte", after the price of the ticket, which was a ducat). He frequently performed with Mayseder throughout his career, and was even dubbed "the Mayseder of the cello".

After touring the Austrian provinces, in 1816 or 1818 Merk was appointed to his teacher Schindlöker's old post of principal cellist at the Vienna Court Opera.

In 1822 Franz Schubert wrote a quartet for male voices, Geist der Liebe (D.747; Op. 11, No. 3), especially for a Joseph Merk concert. In turn, Merk dedicated his 20 Études, Op. 11, to Schubert.

In 1823 Merk became professor at the Vienna Conservatory, remaining in that position until 1848. His pupils included Karl Leopold Böhm, Anton Träg, Jacques Franco-Mendès and Franz Knecht.

He became associated with Ludwig van Beethoven's Triple Concerto, his performances of it helping to bring it out of the obscurity in which it had languished since its debut in 1808 (Beethoven himself having never played it in public, unlike his piano concertos). These include performances in 1825 or 1830 with Mayseder and the pianist Carl Maria von Bocklet.

In 1829, the 19-year-old Frédéric Chopin visited Vienna, and dedicated his Introduction and Polonaise brillante, Op. 3, to Joseph Merk. In a letter, Chopin wrote "On Thursday there was a soiree at Fuchs's, when Limmer introduced some of his own compositions for four violoncellos. Merk as usual made them more beautiful than they really were by his playing, which is so full of soul. He is the only violoncellist I really respect". Chopin was also said to have played with Merk.

He was named k.k. Kammervirtuoso (translated as Imperial and Royal Chamber Virtuoso) to the Emperor in 1834. Up to 1837-38, only five other musicians had ever been given this special title: the violinists Niccolò Paganini and Joseph Mayseder, the pianist Sigismond Thalberg, and the singers Giuditta Pasta and Jenny Lutzer. In 1836 a reviewer wrote that Merk "would undoubtedly evoke admiration among those who give preference to singing instead of to difficulties alien to the nature of the instrument. Let all the cellists imitate his tone, taste, performance and abandon useless torments in conquering difficulties that never touch anybody's soul."

In 1836 Friedrich August Kummer dedicated his Souvenir de la Suisse, Concertino for cello and orchestra, Op. 30, to Joseph Merk.

On 19 April 1838 Merk played Beethoven's "Archduke" Trio with Mayseder and Franz Liszt. Liszt also played privately for Merk, and on 23 April the two took part in a performance of Hummel's Septet for piano, flute, oboe, horn, viola, cello and bass.

Joseph Merk's compositions include a Concerto, a Concertino, an Adagio and Rondo, a Polonaise, various sets of variations, études and similar works. His complete list of works can be found here.

He died in Vienna's 19th district Döbling in 1852, aged 57.
