= Adolf Terschak =

Austrian flautist and composer

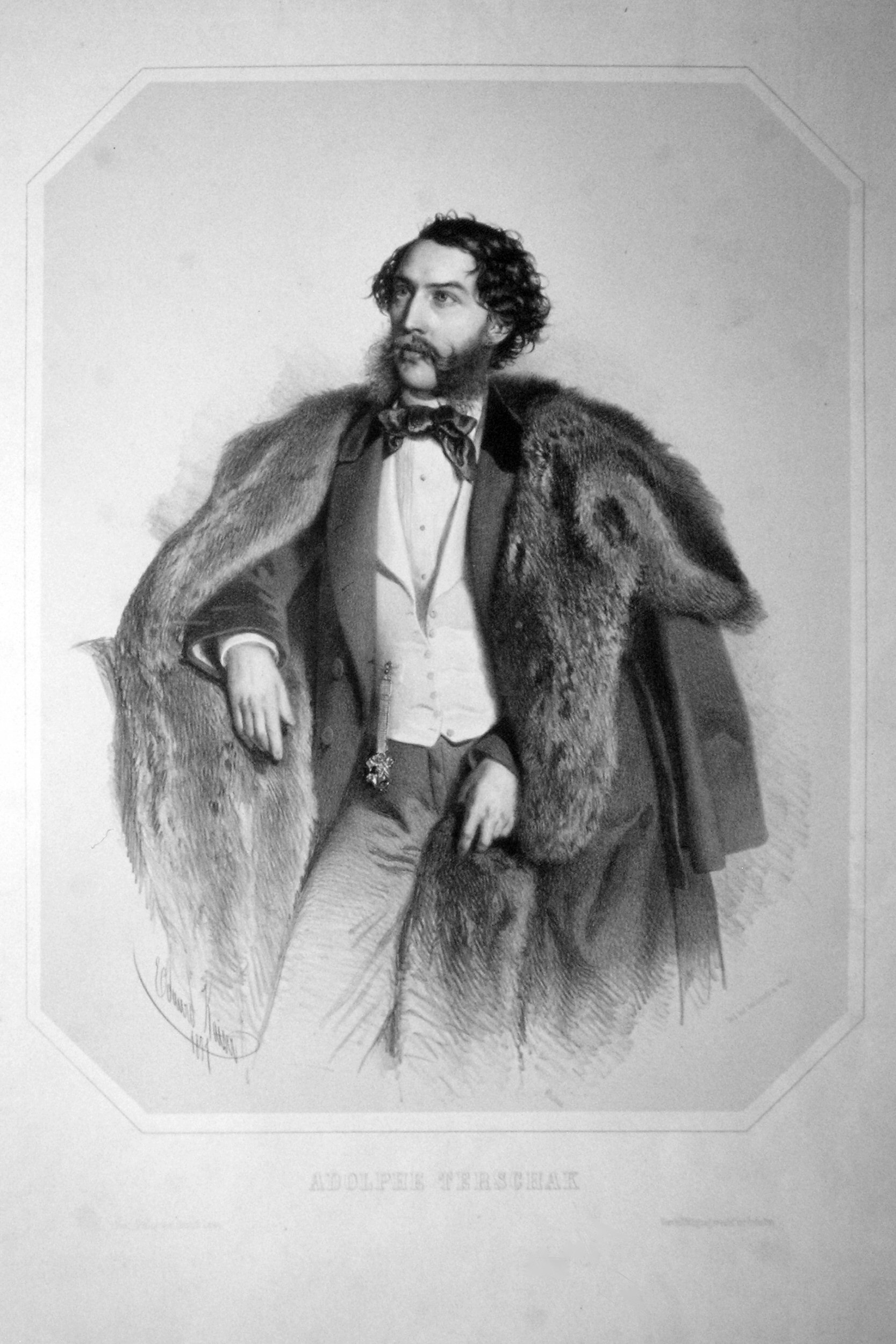
Lithograph by Eduard Kaiser

Adolf Terschak (21 April 1832 – 1 October 1901) was an Austrian flautist and composer, mainly of music for the flute. He travelled to many places, in Europe and beyond, to give concerts.

== Life ==
Terschak was born in Prague; when he was seven the family moved to Hermannstadt (now Sibiu) in Transylvania, where he had lessons on the flute and in harmony. He went to Vienna in 1850, where at the Vienna Conservatory he studied the flute with Franz Zierer, and counterpoint and harmony with Carl Schlesinger and Simon Sechter.

From late 1852 he toured, first to Berlin, where his playing was notable enough for him to be heard at court; then to Hamburg, and in 1853 to London, where he played at upper-class salons; then to Ireland and Scotland, and in the winter of 1853 to Paris and to southern France, finally returning to Transylvania. In February 1856 he began a tour lasting a year and a half, to Bucharest, Iași, Ukraine and Russia, including several towns in Siberia. He later visited Prague in 1860 and toured Germany in 1863. He is said to have also visited Korea, China, Japan and Iceland. He died in Breslau (now Wrocław) in 1901.

== Commentaries ==
His biographer in Biographisches Lexikon des Kaiserthums Oesterreich (1882) wrote: "As far as Terschak as a flute player is concerned, his playing is soulful, pure in tone, both in forte and piano; there is an inimitable bravura in his decrescendo, the delivery is powerful and plentiful, the sound is immensely sympathetic, the technique is masterful."

H. Macaulay FitzGibbon, in The Story of the Flute (1914), wrote: "As regards his playing, his power and execution were immense, but his tone was coarse and windy; moreover he was generally out of tune, and in 1878 his attempts to tune with the orchestra at the Crystal Palace so signally failed that he left in disgust. He was a tall, strong, handsome man, but in later life he suffered much from his eyes, and his health broke down."

== Works ==
Terschak wrote a large number of works for the flute. He also wrote vocal and orchestral works, and an opera Thais.

H. Macaulay FitzGibbon (1914) wrote that his flute solos "vary considerably in excellence... and some of his later efforts are more like studies or finger exercises than solos. But many of his earlier compositions (such as Bahillard and La Siréne) are full of ear-haunting melody, and have rarely been equalled. Not only are they admirably written for, and extremely playable on the flute, but also the accompaniments are full and grateful to the pianist."
