= Études-Tableaux =

Études-Tableaux ("study-pictures") may refer to:

- The eight Études-Tableaux, Op. 33, a set of piano études composed by Sergei Rachmaninoff in 1911
- The nine Études-Tableaux, Op. 39, a set of piano études composed by Sergei Rachmaninoff in 1916–17
- The five Études-Tableaux, orchestrations of five pieces by Ottorino Respighi, from Rachmaninoff's études Op. 33 and 39. See Études-Tableaux, Op. 33#Arrangements.
