= David Popper =

Bohemian cellist and composer (1843–1913)

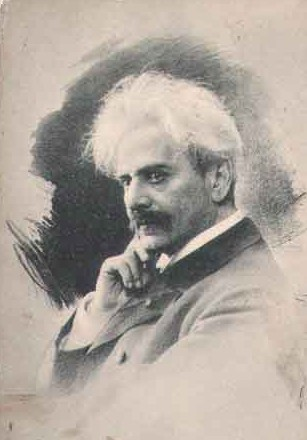
David Popper

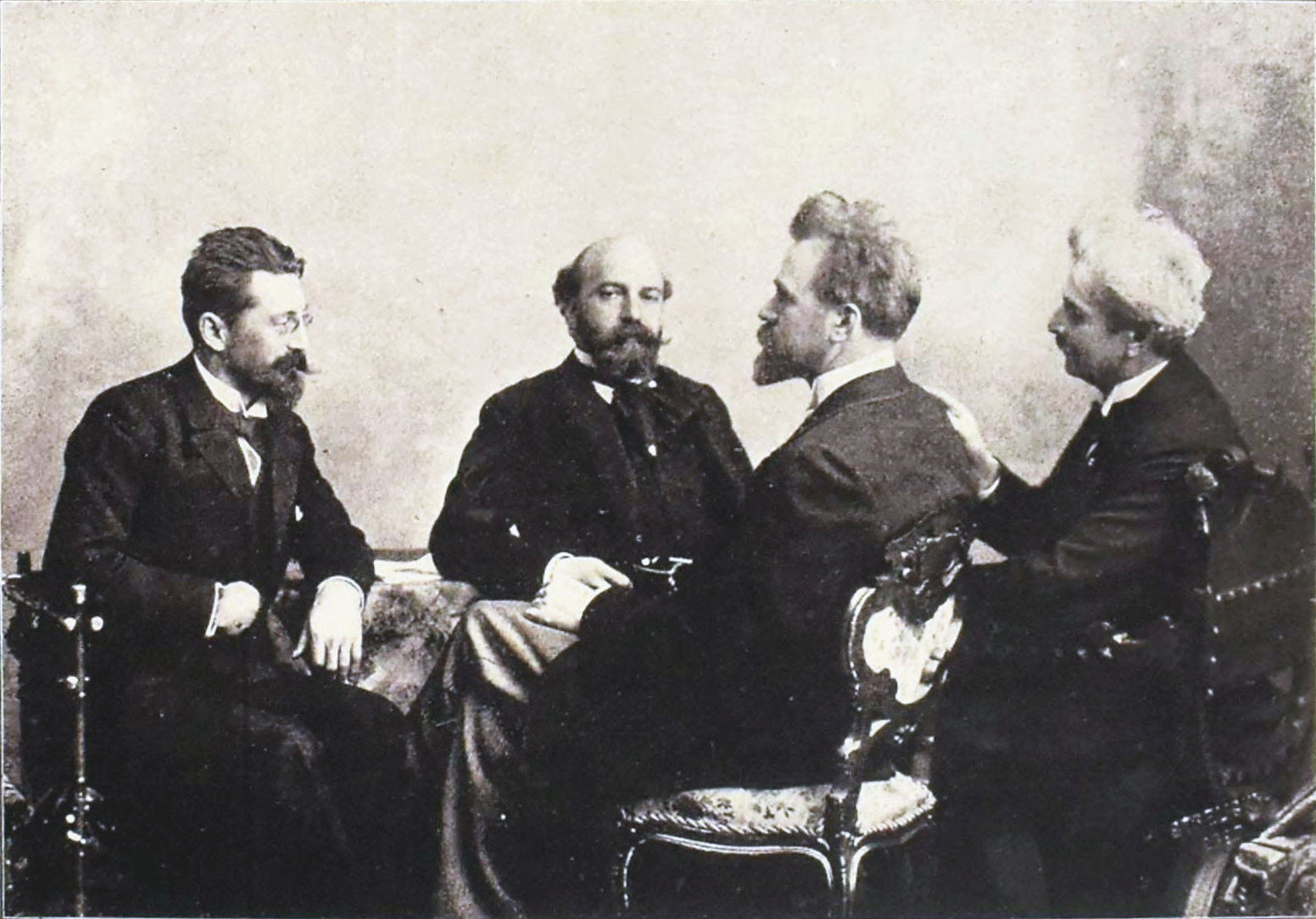
Hubay-Popper-Quartett in 1898

David Popper (June 18, 1843 – August 7, 1913) was a Bohemian cellist and composer.

== Life ==
Popper was born in Prague, and studied music at the Prague Conservatory. His family was Jewish. He studied the cello under Julius Goltermann (1825–1876) and soon attracted attention. He made his first tour in 1863; in Germany he was praised by Hans von Bülow, son-in-law of Franz Liszt, who recommended him as Chamber Virtuoso in the court of Prince von Hohenzollern-Hechingen in Löwenberg. In 1864, he premiered Robert Volkmann's Cello Concerto in A minor, Op. 33, with Hans von Bülow conducting the Berlin Philharmonic. He lost this job a couple of years later due to the prince's death.

In 1866, after a successful season in London, he was invited by the court of Württemberg to stay at Friedrichshafen for two weeks. The invitation included the pianist Anna Mehlig as well. The two of them were expected to perform regularly for the royal couple, which they seemed to have fulfilled satisfactorily, as Anna Mehlig was awarded the honorary title of court pianist shortly afterwards. Popper composed a "Romance" for piano and cello during his stay which he dedicated to Mehlig.

He made his debut in Vienna in 1867, and was made principal cellist at the Hofoper. From 1868 to 1870 he was also a member of the Hellmesberger Quartet. In 1872, he married pianist Sophie Menter, a pupil of Liszt who later joined the staff at the St. Petersburg Conservatory. In 1873, Popper resigned from his post at the Hofoper so as to continue his tours with his wife on a larger scale, giving concerts throughout Europe. Popper's and Menter's marriage was dissolved in 1886.

That year, Liszt recommended Popper for a teaching position at the newly opened string department at the Conservatory at Budapest. In Budapest, he participated in the Budapest Quartet with Jenő Hubay. He and Hubay performed chamber music on more than one occasion with Johannes Brahms, including the premiere of Brahms's Piano Trio No. 3 in Budapest, on December 20, 1886.

Popper died in Baden, near Vienna.

Among his notable students were Arnold Földesy, Jenő Kerpely, Mici Lukács, Ludwig Lebell and Adolf Schiffer (teacher of János Starker).

David Popper was one of the last great cellists who did not use an endpin. An 1880 drawing of Popper playing in a string quartet shows that although he started his cello career without using an endpin, he adopted it later in his life. An old edition of the Grove Dictionary of Music and Musicians described him thus: "His tone is large and full of sentiment; his execution highly finished, and his style classical."

== Works ==
Elfentanz (2:50)
Performed by Hans Goldstein (cello) and Mellicia Straaf (piano)

Popper was a prolific composer of cello music, writing four concertos under his own name (the so-called fifth cello concerto of Joseph Haydn, supposedly realized by Popper from the older composer's sketches, is almost certainly another original composition), a Requiem for three cellos and orchestra (1891) and a number of smaller pieces which are still played today, including the solo piece Tarantella. His shorter showpieces were written to highlight the unique sound and style of the cello, extending the instrument's range with pieces such as Spinnlied (Spinning Song), Elfentanz (Dance of the Elves), or the Ungarische Rhapsodie (Hungarian Rhapsody), which was published by the Friedrich Hofmeister Musikverlag. He also wrote instructional pieces. Popper is also known for his High School of Cello Playing (Op. 73), a book of cello études that is widely used by advanced cello students.

- Op. 2, Five Songs for Soprano
- Op. 3, Scenes From a Masked Ball, cello and piano
  - No. 1, Arlequin (Harlequin) in F Major
  - No. 2, Warum? (Why?) in A Major
  - No. 3, Erzählung (Story) in E Major
  - No. 4, Papillon (Butterfly) in D Major
  - No. 5, Begegnung (Meeting) in F Major
  - No. 6, Lied (Song) in G Major
- Op. 5, Romance, cello and piano
- Op. 8, Concerto No. 1 in D minor, cello and orchestra
- Op. 10, Pieces for cello and piano
  - No. 1, Sarabande
  - No. 2, Gavotte, in D minor
  - No. 3, Trio-Pastoral
- Op. 11, Pieces for cello and piano
  - No. 1, Widmung
  - No. 2, Humoreske
  - No. 3, Mazurka in G minor
- Op. 12, Mazurka in D minor, cello and piano
- Op. 14, Polonaise de concert, cello and piano
  - Chanson d'autrefois, cello and piano
- Op. 16, Suite for two cellos
  - March for two cellos
- Op. 18, Sérénade orientale, cello and piano
- Op. 22, Nocturne in G major, cello and piano
- Op. 23, Pieces for cello and piano
  - No. 1, [n. d.]
  - No. 2, Gavotte in D major
- Op. 24, Concerto No. 2 in E minor, for cello and orchestra
- Op. 27, Preludes for cello solo
  - No. 1, Andante serioso; [n. d.]
- Op. 28, Concert-Polonaise No. 2 in F major, cello and piano
- Op. 32, Pieces for cello and piano
  - No. 1, Nocturne
  - No. 2, Mazurka in A major
- Op. 33, Tarantella, cello and piano
- Op. 35, Four Mazurkas, cello and piano
- Op. 38, Barcarolle in G major, cello and piano
- Op. 39, Dance of the Elves, cello and piano
- Op. 40, Three Songs (for Soprano or Tenor)
- Op. 41, Nocturne, cello and piano
- Op. 42, Three Nocturnes, cello and piano
- Op. 43, Fantasy on Little Russian Songs, cello and piano
- Op. 46, 2 Transcriptions for Cello and Piano
  - No. 1, Schlummerlied aus der “Mainacht" by Rimsky-Korsakov
  - No. 2, Träurmerei aus den “Kinderszenen” by Schumann
- Op. 47, Nocturne No.4 in B Minor for cello and piano
- Op. 48, Menuetto in D major, cello and piano
- Op. 49, Kaiser-Marsch zur Krönung Seiner Majestät Kaiser Alexander III. for Orchestra
- Op. 50, Im Walde, Suite for cello and orchestra
  - No. 1, Eintritt (Entrance)
  - No. 2, Gnomentanz (Gnomes Dance)
  - No. 3, Andacht (Devotion)
  - No. 4, Reigen (Round Dance)
  - No. 5, Herbstblume (Autumn Flower)
  - No. 6, Heimkehr (Homecoming)
- Op. 51, Six Mazurkas, cello and piano
- Op. 54, Spanish Dances, cello and piano
  - No. 1, Zur Gitarre
  - No. 2, Serenade
  - No. 3, Spanische Tänze
  - No. 4, L'Andalouse
  - No. 5, Vito
- Op. 55, Pieces for cello and piano
  - No. 1, Spinning Song
  - No. 2, Hunting Piece
- Op. 59, Concerto No. 3 in G major, cello and orchestra
- Op. 60, Walzer Suite, cello and piano
- Op. 62, Pieces for cello and piano
  - No. 1, La Mémoire
  - No. 2, La Chanson villageoise (Village Song)
  - No. 3, La Berceuse
- Op. 64, Pieces for cello and piano
  - No. 1, Wie einst in schöner’n tagen (Once in Fairer Days)
  - No. 2, Tarantelle, in A major
  - No. 3, Wiegenlied (Lullaby)
- Op. 65, Pieces for cello and piano
  - No. 1, Adagio
  - No. 2, Menuetto
  - No. 3, Polonaise
- Op. 66, Requiem, for three cellos and piano (originally for three cellos and orchestra)
- Op. 67, Pieces for cello and piano
  - No. 1, Largo
  - No. 2, Gavotte in D minor
  - No. 3, [n. d.]
  - No. 4, Gavotte in D minor
- Op. 68, Hungarian Rhapsody, cello and piano
- Op. 69, Suite for cello and piano
  - Largo à l'ancienne mode
- Op. 71, Scottish Fantasy, cello and piano
- Op. 72, Concerto No. 4 in B minor, cello and orchestra
- Op. 73, High School of Cello Playing (Hohe Schule des Violoncellospiels): Forty Études for Cello Solo
- Op. 74, String Quartet in C minor
- Op. 75, Serenade, cello and piano
- Op. 76, Zehn mittelschwere große Etüden [a/k/a Studies (Preparatory to Op. 73)]
- Op. 76a, Fünfzehn leichte melodisch-rhythmische Etüden
- Op. 81, Gavotte in A Major for Cello and Piano

Works with unknown or no opus number

- Joseph Haydn: Cello Concerto No. 5 in C-Major, Hob. VIIb:5 (see above; almost certainly an original composition by Popper)
- Cadenzas for cello
  - Joseph Haydn: Cello Concerto in D major
  - Camille Saint-Saëns: Concerto in A minor, Op. 33
  - Robert Volkmann: Cello Concerto in A minor
  - Robert Schumann: Cello Concerto in A minor, Op. 129
  - Molique, B.: Cello Concerto in D major
- Romance in G major for cello and piano, originally for violin and piano
- Chant du soir, cello and piano

Arrangements and transcriptions for cello and piano

- Bach, J.S., Arie aus der D-dur Suite
- Chopin, Nocturne, Op. 9, No. 2
- Campioni, Minuet Pastoral
- Cherubini, Ave Maria
- Giordani, Caro mio ben
- Handel, Largo; Sarabande
- Jámbor, Nocturne, Op. 8, No. 1
- Jensen, Murmelndes Lüftchen, Op. 21, No. 4
- Mendelssohn, Auf Flügeln des Gesanges; Reiselied, Op. 19, No. 6
- Pergolesi, Nina (Tre giorni)
- Purcell, Aria
- Rubinstein, Mélodie, Op. 3, No. 1
- Schubert, Du bist die Ruh’; Ave Maria, Op. 52, No. 4; Der Neugierige; Sei mir gegrüsst; Litanei auf das Fest "Allerseelen"; An die Musik
- Schumann, Träumerei, Op. 15, No. 7; Abendlied, Op. 85, No. 12; Schlummerlied, Op. 124, No. 16
- Svendsen, Romance in G-major, op. 26
- Tchaikovsky, Song Without Words, Op 2, No. 3; Chanson triste, Op. 40, No. 2; Barcarolle, Op. 37, No. 6; Perce-Niegre, Op. 37, No. 4; Chant d’automne, Op. 37, No. 10
