= Elgar Cello Concerto discography =

Edward Elgar's Cello Concerto received its first complete recording in 1928. A truncated version had been recorded under the composer's supervision, using the acoustic recording process, but it was not until the introduction of electrical recording in the mid-1920s that large orchestral works of this kind could be adequately put on disc. All the recordings up to 1963 were monaural. The first stereophonic studio recording, by Jacqueline du Pré, the London Symphony Orchestra and Sir John Barbirolli, has remained in the catalogues continuously since its first release, and is still used by many as a touchstone.

== Recordings by date ==
Soloist	Orchestra	Conductor	Label	Date
Beatrice Harrison	Symphony Orchestra (Note: Most of Elgar's acoustic recordings employed an orchestra billed simply as "The Symphony Orchestra")	Sir Edward Elgar	His Master's Voice	1919/1920
Beatrice Harrison	New Symphony Orchestra	Sir Edward Elgar	His Master's Voice	1928
W H Squire	Hallé	Sir Hamilton Harty	Columbia	1930
Gregor Piatigorsky	New York Philharmonic-Symphony	John Barbirolli	Somm	1940 (live recording)
Pablo Casals	BBC Symphony	Sir Adrian Boult	EMI	1945
Anthony Pini	London Philharmonic	Eduard van Beinum	Decca	1950
Paul Tortelier	BBC Symphony	Sir Malcolm Sargent	EMI	1954
Pierre Fournier	Kölner Rundfunk-Sinfonieorchester	Hans Rosbaud	Archipel	1955
André Navarra	Hallé	Sir John Barbirolli	Pye	1957
Mstislav Rostropovich	Moscow Philharmonic	Natan Rakhlin	Revelation	1958 (live recording)
Jacqueline du Pré	BBC Symphony	Sir Malcolm Sargent	Pristine Audio	1962 (live recording)
Jacqueline du Pré	BBC Symphony	Sir Malcolm Sargent	Intaglio	1963 (live recording)
Jacqueline du Pré	BBC Symphony	Sir Malcolm Sargent	BBC Legends	1964 (live recording)
Mstislav Rostropovich	Moscow Philharmonic	Gennadi Rozhdestvensky	Russiandisc	1964 (live recording)
Mstislav Rostropovich	London Symphony	Gennadi Rozhdestvensky	BBC Legends	1965 (live recording)
Jacqueline du Pré	London Symphony	Sir John Barbirolli	EMI	1965
Pierre Fournier	Berlin Philharmonic	Alfred Wallenstein	DG	1967
Jacqueline du Pré	BBC Symphony	Sir John Barbirolli	Testament	1967 (live recording)
Mstislav Rostropovich	London Symphony	Gennadi Rozhdestvensky	Intaglio	1967 (live recording)
Vladimir Orloff	Hallé Orchestra	Sir John Barbirolli	Doremi	1968 (live recording)
Zara Nelsova	BBC Symphony	Charles Groves	BBC Radio Classics	1969 (live recording)
Jacqueline du Pré	Phikadelphia	Daniel Barenboim	CBS	1970 (live recording)
Paul Tortelier	London Philharmonic	Sir Adrian Boult	EMI	1972
Paul Tortelier	BBC Symphony	Sir Adrian Boult	BBC Legends	1972 (live recording)
Erling Blöndal Bengtsson	Iceland Symphony	Jean-Pierre Jacquillat	Danacord	1973 (live recording)
James Whitehead	Adelaide Symphony	Carl Pini	SAREC	1975
Ralph Kirshbaum	Scottish National	Sir Alexander Gibson	Chandos	1979
Robert Cohen	London Philharmonic	Norman Del Mar	EMI	1980
Lynn Harrell	Cleveland	Lorin Maazel	Decca	1981
Heinrich Schiff	Staatskapelle Dresden	Sir Neville Marriner	Philips	1985
Yo-Yo Ma	London Symphony	André Previn	Sony	1985
Julian Lloyd Webber	Royal Philharmonic	Yehudi Menuhin	Philips	1985
Felix Schmidt	London Symphony	Rafael Frühbeck de Burgos	Carlton Classics / LSO Live	1988
Steven Isserlis	London Symphony	Richard Hickox	Virgin	1988
Paul Tortelier	Royal Philharmonic	Sir Charles Groves	RPO Records	1988
Rivka Golani (viola)	Royal Philharmonic	Vernon Handley	Conifer	1988
Alexander Baillie	BBC Philharmonic	Edward Downes	Conifer	1989
Mischa Maisky	Philharmonia	Giuseppe Sinopoli	DG	1990
Truls Mørk	Monte-Carlo Philharmonic	Michel Tabachnik	Lyrinx	1990
Michaela Fukačová	Filharmonie Brno	Libor Pešek	Supraphon	1991
Robert Cohen	Royal Philharmonic	Sir Charles Mackerras	Argo	1991
Maria Kliegel	Royal Philharmonic	Michael Halász	Naxos	1992
János Starker	Philharmonia	Leonard Slatkin	RCA	1992
Torleif Thedéen	Malmö Symphony	Lev Markiz	BIS Records	1992
Colin Carr	BBC Philharmonic	Yan Pascal Tortelier	BBC Music Magazine	1992
Françoise Groben	Orchestre Symphonique de RTL	Leopold Hager	Banque Générale du Luxembourg	1994
Karina Georgian	Moscow Symphony	Konstantin Krimets	Amadis	1994
Arto Noras	Finnish Radio Symphony	Jukka-Pekka Saraste	Finlandia	1994
Shauna Rolston	Calgary Symphony	Mario Bernardi	CBC Records	1995
Yoohong Lee	Royal Philharmonic	Yehudi Menuhin	Royal Philharmonic	1995
Julian Lloyd Webber	BBC Philharmonic	Yan Pascal Tortelier	BBC Music Magazine	1997
Kalina Krusteva	Bulgarian Radio Symphony Orchestra	Boris Hinchev	Gega	1999
Pieter Wispelwey	Radio Filharmonisch Orkest	Jac van Steen	Channel Classics	1999
Truls Mørk	City of Birmingham Symphony	Sir Simon Rattle	Virgin	1999
Erling Blöndal Bengtsson	Oslo Philharmonic	Alexander Lazarev	Danacord	2000 (live recording)
Amit Peled	Jerusalem Symphony	Vag Papian	CTM	2004
Anne Gastinel	City of Birmingham Symphony	Justin Brown	Naïve	2004
Li-Wei Qin	Adelaide Symphony	Nicholas Braithwaite	ABC Classics	2005
Raphael Wallfisch	Royal Liverpool Philharmonic	Richard Dickins	Nimbus	2005
Daniel Müller-Schott	Oslo-Filharmonien	André Previn	Orfeo	2005
Heinrich Schiff	Hallé	Sir Mark Elder	Hallé	2006
Tamás Varga	Budapest Philharmonic	Rico Saccani	BPO live	2007
Natalie Clein	Royal Liverpool Philharmonic	Vernon Handley	EMI	2007
Jian Wang	Sydney Symphony	Vladimir Ashkenazy	ABC Classics	2008
Jamie Walton	Philharmonia	Alexander Briger	Signum	2008
David Aaron Carpenter (viola)	Philharmonia	Christoph Eschenbach	Ondine	2008
Wolfgang Emanuel Schmidt	NDR Radiophilharmonie	Gabriel Feltz	Sony	2009
Allison Eldridge	Royal Flemish Philharmonic	Muhai Tang	Denon	2009
István Várdai	Orchestre de chambre de Genève	Simon Gaudenz	Ysaÿe Records	2009
Sol Gabetta	Danish National Symphony	Mario Venzago	RCA	2010
Paul Watkins	BBC Philharmonic	Sir Andrew Davis	Chandos	2011
Antonio Meneses	Northern Sinfonia	Claudio Cruz	Avie	2012
Alisa Weilerstein	Staatskapelle Berlin	Daniel Barenboim	Decca	2012
Jean-Guihen Queyras	BBC Symphony	Jirí Belohlávek	Harmonia mundi	2012
Zuill Bailey	Indianapolis Symphony	Krzysztof Urbański	Telarc	2013
Li-Wei Qin	London Philharmonic	Zhang Yi	ABC Classics	2014
Hitomi Niikura	Yamagata Symphony	Norichika Iimori	Art Infini	2015
Steven Isserlis	Philharmonia	Paavo Järvi	Hyperion	2015
Sol Gabetta	Berliner Philharmonic	Sir Simon Rattle	Sony	2016
Johannes Moser	Orchestre de la Suisse Romande	Andrew Manze	Pentatone	2016
Nadège Rochat	Staatskapelle Weimar	Paul Meyer	Ars	2016
Hai-Ye Ni	Kalamazoo Symphony	Raymond Harvey	Kalamazoo Symphony	2016
Kim Cook	St Petersburg State Symphony	Arkady Shteinlucht	MSR Classics	2016
Gary Hoffman	Orchestre Philharmonique Royal de Liège	Christian Arming	La Dolce Volta	2017
Wen-Sinn Yang	Taiwan Philharmonic	Lü Shao-Chia	Oehms	2017
Marie-Elisabeth Hecker	Antwerp Symphony	Edo de Waart	Alpha	2018
Sara Sant‘Ambrosio	Royal Philharmonic	Grzegorz Nowak	Sebastian	2018
Sheku Kanneh-Mason	London Symphony	Sir Simon Rattle	Decca	2018
Dai Miyata	BBC Scottish Symphony	Thomas Dausgaard	Dabringhaus und Grimm	2019
Sébastien Hurtaud	New Zealand Symphony	Benjamin Northey	Rubicon	2019
Inbal Segev	London Philharmonic	Marin Alsop	Avie	2019
Giovanni Sollima	Orchestra Filarmonica della Calabria	Filippo Arlia	Brilliant	2019
Sung-Won Yang	London Symphony	Hans Graf	Decca	2025

== Critical opinion ==
The BBC Radio 3 feature "Building a Library" has presented comparative reviews of all available versions of the concerto on three occasions, and recommended as follows:

- 11 February 1984, reviewer, Michael Kennedy:
  - Jacqueline du Pré (1965)
- 27 April 1991, reviewer, Jerrold Northrop Moore:
  - Julian Lloyd Webber
  - Steven Isserlis
  - Beatrice Harrison
  - Paul Tortelier (1998)
- 14 February 2004, reviewer, Richard Morrison:
  - Jacqueline du Pré (1965)
  - Truls Mørk (1999)
  - Yo-Yo Ma

The Penguin Guide to Recorded Classical Music, 2008, gave its maximum four star rating to the 1965 du Pré/Barbirolli recording of the concerto. It awarded three stars (representing "an outstanding performance and recording") to the recordings by Casals, Gastinel, Harrell, Harrison, Isserlis, Ma, Mørk, Noras, Rostropovich (1964), Schiff (2006), Thedéen, and Tortelier (1972, studio).

== Notes, references and sources ==
=== Sources ===
- March, Ivan (ed). The Penguin Guide to Recorded Classical Music 2008, Penguin Books, London, 2007. ISBN 978-0-14-103336-5
