= Concours de violoncelle Rostropovitch =

Cello competition in Paris

The Concours de violoncelle Rostropovitch, (Cello Competition Mstislav Rostropovich), is an international cello competition established in 1977 by the city of Paris.

Year	President	Jury	Commissioned works	Prize
1977	Mstislav Rostropovich	Luciano Berio; Henri Dutilleux; Raya Garbousova; Witold Lutosławski; Pierre Penassou; Iannis Xenakis	Kottos, Iannis Xenakis	1st Grand Prize ex-aequo: Lluís Claret and Frédéric Lodéon 3rd Prize: Yvan Chiffoleau; 4th Prize: Pierre Strauch
1981	Mstislav Rostropovich	Henri Dutilleux; Pierre Fournier; Raya Garbousova; Antonio Janigro; Witold Lutosławski; André Navarra; Leonard Rose; Étienne Vatelot	Quasi scherzando, Gilbert Amy	1st Grand Prize: Maria Kliegel 2nd Grand Prize: Yvan Chiffoleau; 3rd Prize: Carter Brey; 4th Prize: Young Chang Cho
1986	Mstislav Rostropovich	Reine Flachot; Raya Garbousova; Cristóbal Halffter; Ludwig Hoelscher; Alain Meunier; André Navarra; Aldo Parisot; William Pleeth; Étienne Vatelot	Per Slava, Krzysztof Penderecki	Grand Prix de la Ville de Paris: Gary Hoffman 2nd Grand Prize: Gustav Rivinius; 3rd Prize: Christoph Richter
1990	Mstislav Rostropovich	Rodion Shchedrin; Lluís Claret; Natalia Gutman; Frans Helmerson; Frédéric Lodéon; Arto Noras; Tsuyoshi Tsutsumi; Étienne Vatelot; Raphael Wallfisch; Uzi Wiesel	Bribes russes, Rodion Shchedrin	Grand Prix de la Ville de Paris: Wendy Warner. 2nd Grand Prize: Colin Carr; 3rd Prix ex-aequo: Anne Gastinel and Xavier Phillips
1994	Mstislav Rostropovich	Young-Chang Cho; Henri Dutilleux; David Geringas; Natalia Gutman; Frans Helmerson; Alain Meunier; Philippe Muller; Tsuyoshi Tsutsumi; Étienne Vatelot; Uzi Wiesel	Improvisation pour violoncelle seul, Alfred Schnittke	Grand Prix de la Ville de Paris: Han-na Chang 2nd Grand Prize: Wolfgang Emanuel Schmidt; 3rd Prize: Jérôme Pernoo; 4th Prize: Claudio Bohorquez; 5th Prize: Stanimir Todorov; 6th Prize: Matthieu Rogué
1997	Mstislav Rostropovich	Young-Chang Cho; Walter Grimmer; Natalia Chakovskaia; David Geringas; Frans Helmerson; Tsuyoshi Tsutsumi; Étienne Vatelot; Uzi Wiesel	Spins and Spells, Kaija Saariaho	Grand Prix de la Ville de Paris: Enrico Dindo 2nd Grand Prix : Hai-Ye Ni; 3rd Prize: Monika Leskovar; 4th Prize: Oren Shevlin; 5th Prize: Sol Gabetta Timacheff; 6th Prize: Boris Andrianov
2001	Mstislav Rostropovich	Natalia Chakovskaïa; Young-Chang Cho; David Geringas; Frans Helmerson; Philippe Muller; Arto Noras; Marco Stroppa; Tsuyoshi Tsutsumi; Étienne Vatelot; Uzi Wiesel	Ay, there’s the rub, Marco Stroppa	Grand Prix de la Ville de Paris: Tatjana Vassiljeva 2nd Grand Prix: Oren Shevlin; 3rd Prize: Sophie Shao; 4th Prize: Mark Kosower; 5th Prize: Enrico Bronzi; 6th Prize: Romain Garioud
2005	Mstislav Rostropovich	Natalia Chakovskaïa; Young-Chang Cho; Frans Helmerson; Gary Hoffman; Alain Meunier; Philippe Muller; Arto Noras; Raimund Trenkler; Tsuyoshi Tsutsumi; Étienne Vatelot	Oyan!, Franghiz Ali-Zadeh	Grand Prix de la Ville de Paris: Marie-Elisabeth Hecker 2nd Grand Prix : Julian Steckel; 3rd Prize: Giorgi Kharadze; 4th Prize: Kaori Yamagami; 5th Prize: Renaud Déjardin; 6th Prize: Elizaveta Sushchenko
2009	Krzysztof Penderecki; Honorary President: Elena Rostropovich	Natalia Chakovskaïa; Young-Chang Cho; Frans Helmerson; Gary Hoffman; Philippe Muller; Arto Noras; Raimund Trenkler; Tsuyoshi Tsutsumi	Invocation, Éric Tanguy	Grand Prix de la Ville de Paris: Dai Miyata. 2nd Prize - Prix de l'Académie des Beaux Arts: Jacob Koranyi; 3rd Prize - Prix offert par le Fonds pour la Création Musicale: Norbert Anger; 4th Prize : Sietse-Jan Weijenberg

== See also ==
- List of classical music competitions
