= Christoph Richter (cellist) =

German musician and teacher

- Born: 1957 (age 68–69); Bonn, North Rhine-Westphalia, Germany
- Occupations: Classical cellist; Academic teacher
- Organizations: NDR Sinfonieorchester; Cherubini Quartet; Folkwang University of the Arts; Royal Academy of Music

Christoph Richter (born 1957) is a German cellist and academic teacher. He is focused on chamber music and has taught at the Folkwang University of the Arts in Essen and the Royal Academy of Music in London.

== Life and career ==
Born in Bonn to a musical family, Richter began to play the piano at age three and the cello at age five. He studied cello at the Musikhochschule Detmold with André Navarra from 1972, and later with Pierre Fournier. He was principal cellist of the NDR Sinfonieorchester in Hamburg from 1981 to 1988. In 1986, he achieved prizes at both the Geneva International Music Competition and the Concours de violoncelle Rostropovitch in Paris, where he was also awarded the prize of the city of Paris for the best interpretation of Krzysztof Penderecki's Per Slava für cello solo.

The conductor Sándor Végh interested him in chamber music. He played in the Cherubini Quartet, founded the Boccherini Cello Duo with Xenia Jankovic, and a string trio with violiist Isabelle Faust and violist Thomas Riebl. With pianist and conductor András Schiff, he has played sonatas and chamber music with piano, and as solo cellist in the chamber orchestra Cappella Andrea Barca since Schiff founded it in 1999. He has also performed chamber music with Lars Anders Tomter, Levon Chilingirian, Peter Csaba, Heinz Holliger, Henning Kraggerud, Alexander Lonquich, Dénes Várjon, and Tabea Zimmermann, among others.

Richter was appointed professor of cello at the Folkwang University of the Arts in Essen in 1988. He has given master classes throughout Europe. He has lectured regularly at the European Chamber Music Academy in Vienna, Zürich, Manchester and Paris since it was founded in 2004. Richter was the cellist of the Heine Quartet that he co-founded in 2004, playing until 2009, teaching at the Guildhall School of Music in London. After regular master classes at the Royal Academy of Music in London, he was appointed professor there in 2015.

In 2001, he recorded Julius Klengel's Cello Concertos for a CD jointly produced by cpo and NDR.
