= Benyamin Sönmez =

- Born: January 16, 1983; Bremen, Germany
- Origin: Ankara, Turkey
- Died: December 1, 2011 (aged 28) Ankara, Turkey
- Genres: Classical music
- Occupation: Cellist
- Instrument: Cello

Benyamin Sönmez (January 16, 1983 – November 30, 2011) was a Turkish classical cellist.

== Early years and family ==
Benyamin was born to Turkish parents in Bremen, Germany. His father went to Germany in the 1970s as a tourist taking his musical instrument saz with him. He stayed there, formed a musical group and earned his living playing music at weddings. Later, his mother followed his father to Germany. As Benyamin was three years old, the family with two boys returned home.

Benyamin spent his childhood in Akşehir, a town in Konya Province, where the alleged tomb of Nasreddin Hoca is located. During his primary school years, he contributed to family's budget by selling food and drinks at street.

Benyamin Sönmez grew up in a family that performed music altogether at home. As his father played tambur and his mother sang, his elder brother Mehmet and he accompanied their parents by playing kanun and darbuka. He remembers that his childhood toys were musical instruments like kanun, oud, cümbüş, electronic organ, darbuka, tambur, saz, ney as well as guitar. His father, a talented musician without any formal musical education, made Benyamin love music and introduced him in playing various musical instruments.

As a child, he accompanied his father at his father's musical performances with his group on stage at weddings. Benyamin envied his father, and imitated him at home after their return. A member of his father's musical group became aware of his elder brother's musical talent and advised to send him to conservatory. His brother Mehmet Sönmez studied playing contrabass at Ankara State Conservatory. After winning an international prize, his brother went to Belgium to play with the Royal Orchestra. He is currently a member of the Turkish Presidential Symphony Orchestra.

== Education ==
Benyamin was a primary school pupil as his brother Mehmet studied at the conservatory in Ankara. Mehmet listened to classical music at home when he was on vacation. Once, Benyamin was very impressed by the music of Shostakovich, which his brother listened to at home. Mehmet, noticing his brother's interest in classical music, took him to Ankara. At the age of 13, Benyamin took an admission test for the conservatory at the Hacettepe University. He failed the test and his brother was told by the jury that Benyamin was not talented for music.

Returning home, Benyamin was eager to study music. He took the test again the next year, and this time he passed. He was asked what musical instrument he liked to play. He replied "Violoncello", because its name sounded nice to him, even though he had never seen an example of it. The jury looked at his fingers and approved his choice. He saw a cello for the first time in the conservatory's string instrument workshop. He says he would not have complained if he had to study viola or violin instead of cello.

In his first years at the conservatory, he surprised everyone by playing works that were actually reserved for higher classes. He used to start the day by playing Dvořák and finish with Elgar. Benyamin was very impressed by Rostropovich. Even he admired Heinrich Schiff, André Navarra, Pierre Fournier and Pablo Casals much, he used to try imitate Rostropovich.

At the age of 17, he decided to take part at a cello contest at the Bilkent University, which had more challenging requirements for musical repertoire than at the conservatory. He practiced for four months for this contest, instead of preparing for the examination that was scheduled one day before it. Benyamin failed that examination, but he won the first prize the next day at the contest in front of a jury composed of an American cellist Gürer Aykal and Doğan Cangal, who was a member of the examination commission the day before. Sönmez says by winning the first prize, he was able to save the honor of his cello teacher Nuray Eşen. From then on, he practiced much more seriously.

For further studies, Benyamin was recommended to Natalia Gutman by Yuri Bashmet via pianist Gulmira Tokombaeva, a teacher from Kyrgyzstan at the Ankara conservatory. Between 2003 and 2007, he studied under Natalia Gutman, first at Stuttgart Hochschule für Musik in Germany and later at Moscow Conservatory in Russia. In Moscow, he was frequently invited to her home, where he had the opportunity to meet notable writers, artists and musicians including Yuri Bashmet, Viktor Tretiakov, Vasily Lobanov, Eliso Virsaladze, Mischa Maisky, Kurt Masur.

== Career ==
By the time, he was 17, having proved his superior musical skills, he came first in the national cello contest. He was given a place within BBC soloists in 2000. He won a special award at the International Young Concert Artists Contest organized in Leipzig, Germany in 2001.

Benyamin Sonmez earned a special prize in the 2006 Adam International Cello Festival and Competition in New Zealand.

Sönmez had a rich repertoire, performing pieces from Bach to Sofia Gubaidulina. He also had master class performances with the great cellists like Rostropovich, David Geringas, Philippe Muller, Alexander Rudin, Stefan Popov, Frans Helmerson, Ruben Dobrovsky, Miklós Perényi and Yo-Yo Ma.

Sonmez has also studied authentic performance of the Cello Suites of Bach, together with the master of baroque cello Anner Bylsma. Of the important music festivals, he was invited to the Schleswig-Holstein Musik Festival and Oleg Kagan International Music Festival in Germany, the International Adam Cello Festival & Competition in New Zealand, RNCM Manchester International Cello Festival in the United Kingdom and Istanbul International Music Festival in Turkey.

His last invitation was to the 80th birthday of M. Rostropovich in 2007. Sonmez, who has performed duo concerts with Oxana Yablonskaya, played his art at important musical centers such as Vienna, Paris, Amsterdam, Moscow, New York City, Washington, D.C., and Istanbul. He was living in istanbul, Turkey.

His repertoire included modern composers including Dmitri Shostakovich, Alfred Schnittke, Giya Kancheli, Sofia Gubaidulina, Ástor Piazzolla and Zoltán Kodály as well as the composers of Baroque and other eras.

He played an 18th-century Matteo Goffriller cello from Venice, Italy.

== Death ==
Sönmez died on December 1, 2011, at the age of 28, after a heart attack in Ankara. Following a funeral ceremony at the Hacettepe University Conservatory, his body was transferred to Fethiye, Muğla Province, where he was laid to rest.
