= Adam International Cello Festival and Competition =

New Zealand music competition (1995–2009)

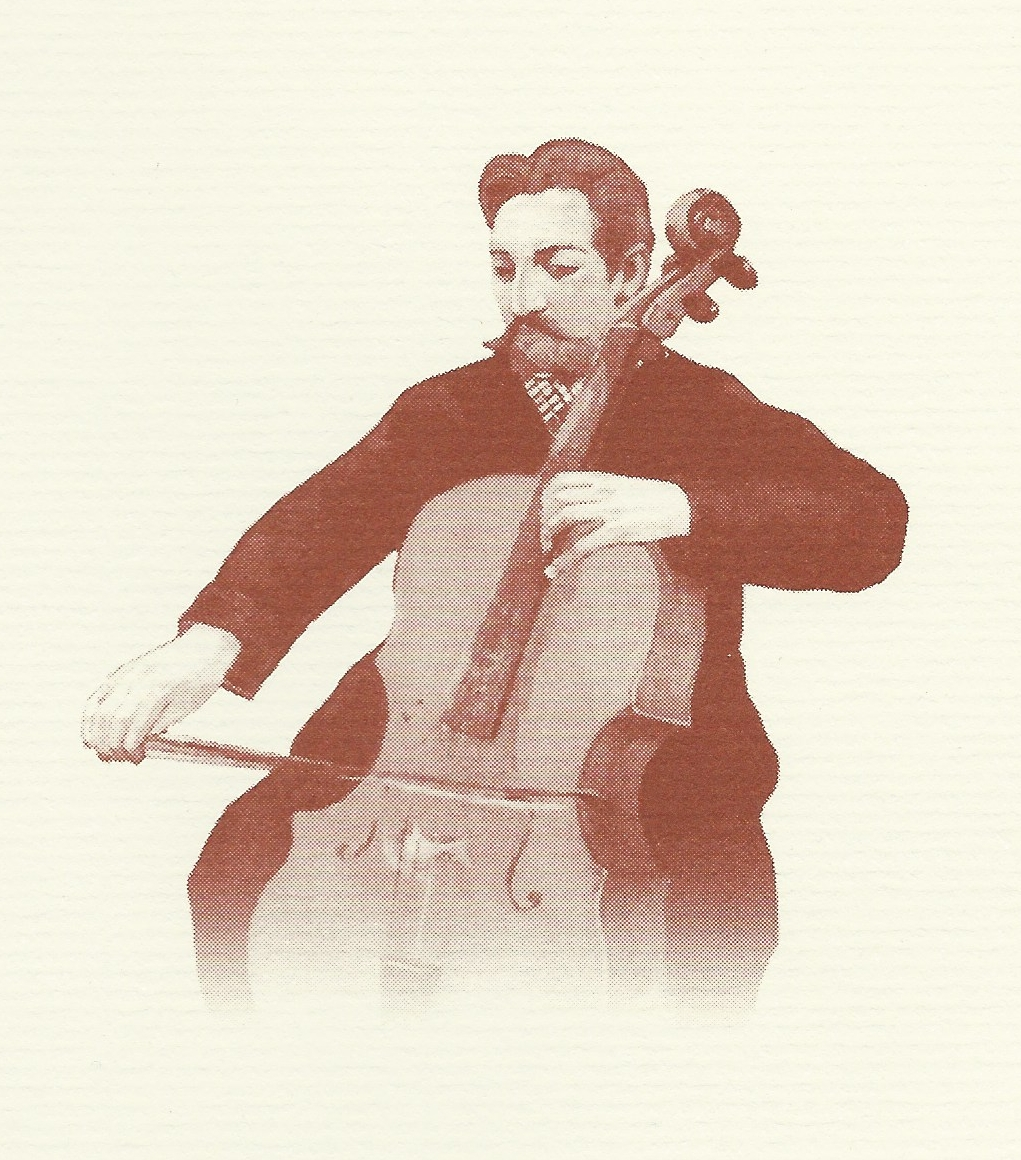
The Adam International Cello Festival and Competition logo. Based on the famous painting by Paul Gauguin Le violoncelliste 1894

The Adam International Cello Festival and Competition took place in Christchurch, New Zealand, every two or three years between 1995 and 2009, on the initiative of Professor Alexander Ivashkin and Professor Natalia Pavlutskaya while on the staff at the School of Music, University of Canterbury. The mission of the competition was to provide an opportunity for gifted young musicians in New Zealand to meet and compete with their international peers. Professor Ivashkin subsequently became the Artistic director of the Festival. The acclaimed Russian cellist, pianist, and conductor Mstislav Rostropovich accepted the position of patron. The Festival and Competition were supported by Denis and Verna Adam of the Adam Foundation, as well as charitable trusts, business and private sponsors.

The festival was based at the Great Hall, located in the Christchurch Arts Centre and took the form of a week long programme of competition rounds, guest recitals, masterclasses, workshops, conversations, and social events.

Applications were accepted from young cellist between the ages of 14 and 30 years old from around the world. The first round consisted of an audio or video tape recording. Around 20 young musicians were selected and invited to compete in the remaining three rounds in Christchurch.

The event culminated in a final gala, in which the finalists performed a concerto with the Christchurch Symphony Orchestra in the Christchurch Town Hall. The winner received a cash prize, a recording contract with Naxos Records, and a performance contract with the New Zealand Symphony Orchestra. A number of other prizes were awarded.

The festival's importance was demonstrated by the consistently high calibre of the competitors it attracted and the prizewinners' subsequent international success. It was also reflected in the quality of the international jury panels which included world-renowned cellists.

Funds were raised by the Board of Trustees to produce each festival. Applications were made to a variety of prospective donors, including charity trusts, business sponsors, and private sponsors either for general funding or support.

All competitors were billeted by local families.

The 7th Adams Festival and Competition was held in March and April 2009, this was the last to date. Two consecutive earthquakes in Christchurch, Canterbury, in September 2010 and February 2011, led to massive destruction in Christchurch. Both the Great Hall at the Art Center and the Christchurch Town Hall were damaged. Due to these circumstances the board of trustees decided to cancel future competitions.

== The 1st Adam International Cello Festival and Competition – July 1995 ==
Prize winners:

- 1st place — Wolfgang Schmidt (Germany)
- 2nd place — Martin Osten (Germany)
- 3rd place — Ashley Brown (NZ)

Invited cellists: Ashley Brown, Tara Cuddeford, Ken Endo, Sebastian Foron, Stephen Framil, Charmian Hammill, Christopher Hutton, Matthew Jones, Bongshin Ko, Tibor Nemeth, Martin Osten, Timothy Park, Julie Platt, Wolfgang Schmidt, Peter Seidenberg, Nicolai, Skliarevski, Iaroslav Tcherenkov, Igor Zubkovski.

International jury panel: David Geringas (Lithuania/Germany), Natalia Pavlutskaya (Russia/NZ), Markus Stocker (Switzerland/Australia), Young-Chang Cho (Korea/Germany), Alexander Ivashkin (Russia/NZ)

Finals gala conductor: Theodore Kuchar (United States)

== The 2nd Adam International Cello Festival and Competition – June 1997 ==
Prize winners:

- 1st place — equal Li-Wei Qin (Australia/UK) and Vitautas Sondeckis (Lithuania/Germany)
- 2nd place — equal Alice Neary (UK) and Marie Bittloch (France)
- Special mention — Doo Min Kim (Korea)

Invited cellists: Greg Beaver, Marie Bittloch, Jung-Eun Choi, Christina Christensen, Hye-Min Chung, Fabian Diedrichs, David Garner, Elke Hager, Ichiro Hasabe, Rachel Johnston, Doo Min Kim, Soo-Yeon Kim, Phillip Koerner, Inbal Meggido, Daniel Morris, Alice Neary, Timothy Nemeth, Timothy Park, Julie Platt, Li-Wei Qin, Alexei Sarkissov, Hilmar Schweizer, Vitautus Sondeckis

International jury panel: Siegfried Palm (Germany), Natalia Pavlutskaya (Russia/NZ), David Pereira (Australia), Markus Stocker (Switzerland/Australia), Tsuyoshi Tsutsumi (Japan)

Finals gala conductor: Brian Law (NZ)

== The 3rd Adam International Cello Festival and Competition – July 1999 ==
Prize winners:

- 1st place — Tatjana Vassiljeva (Russia/Germany)
- 2nd place — Gautier Capuçon (France)
- 3rd place — László Fenyö (Hungary/Germany)
- Most Promising Performer — Danjulo Ishizaka (Germany)
- Best Performance of Rostropovich's Humoresque — Thomas Carroll (UK)

International jury panel: Mstislav Rostropovich (didn't come because of the illness), Karine Georgian (Armenia/UK), Alexander Ivashkin (Russia/NZ), Philippe Müller (France), Natalia Pavlutskaya (Russia/NZ), Nathan Waks (Australia)

Finals gala conductor: Sir William Southgate

== The 4th Adam International Cello Festival and Competition – July 2001 ==
Prize winners:

- 1st place — Alexander Neustroev (Russia/Switzerland)
- 2nd place — not awarded
- 3rd place — Yoon-Jung Kim (New Zealand/UK)
- Best performance of Piazzolla "Le Grand Tango" — Yoon-Jung Kim (NZ) and Alexander Neustroev (Russia)
- Most promising cellist — Minah Choe (Australia)

International jury panel: Alexander Ivashkin (Russia/NZ), Torleif Thedéen (Sweden), Georg Pedersen (Denmark/Australia), Natalia Pavlutskaya (Russia/NZ), Lev Markiz (The Netherlands).

Finals gala conductor: Brian Law (NZ)

== The 5th Adam International Cello Festival and Competition – July 2003 ==
Prize winners:

- 1st place — Monika Leskovar (Croatia/Germany)
- 2nd place — David Pia (Switzerland)
- 3rd place — Min Ji Kim (Korea/United States)
- Best performance of a selected work — David Pia (Switzerland)

International jury panel: Lluís Claret (Spain), Alexander Ivashkin (UK/Russia), Laurence Lesser (USA), Natalia Pavlutskaya (UK/Russia), Eleonore Schoenfeld (USA).

Finals Gala Guest Conductor: Brian Law (NZ)

== The 6th Adam International Cello Festival and Competition – July 2006 ==
Prize winners:

- 1st place — Nicolas Altstaedt (Germany)
- 2nd place — Konstantin Manaev (Russia/Germany)
- 3rd place — Soo Bae (United States)
- 4th place — Blaise Dejardin (France/USA)
- Antonio Strings best performance of Boccherini — Benyamin Sönmez (Turkey)
- The Britten Prize best performance of Britten Suite — Konstantin Manaev (Russia/Germany)

International jury panel Alexander Ivashkin (Russia/UK), Simon Morris (UK), Natalia Pavlutskaya (Russia/UK), Leslie Parnas (USA) and Arvo Volmer (Estonia)

Finals Gala Concert Conductor: Arvo Volmer (Estonia)

== The 7th Adam International Cello Festival and Competition – April 2009 ==
Prize winners:

- 1st place — Sébastien Hurtaud (France)
- 2nd place — Adam Mital (Switzerland)
- 3rd place — Stjepan Hauser (Croatia/UK)
- Most promising Young Performer — Santiago Canon Valencia (Colombia)
- Best Performance of Bach — Sebastian Hurtaud (France)
- Best Performance of Rostropovich's Humoresque — Sojin Hwang (Korea/Germany)

International jury panel: Frans Helmerson (Sweden), Alexander Ivashkin (Russia/UK), Natalia Pavlutskaya (Russia/UK), Wolfgang Emanuel Schmidt (Germany), Tsuyoshi Tsutsumi (Japan)

Finals gala conductor: Werner Andreas Albert (Germany)

== Young Composers' Competition ==
Initiated in 2006, The Young Composers’ Competition ran alongside the festival and competition and was open to composers under the age of 30 enrolled in or graduates from a New Zealand secondary or tertiary level School of Music. Applicants were required to compose a solo piece for cello. The winning composition was a mandatory piece in the second round repertoire of the Festival and was also performed in the final Gala

- 2009 Winner — Jonathan Crehan (NZ) – Fantasia Festa
- 2006 Winner — Robin Toan (NZ) – Games

== The 10th Anniversary Gala Prizewinners’ Concert, Wigmore Hall – November 2005 ==
A successful northern hemisphere Gala Prize-winners’ Concert was held in November 2005 in London's Wigmore Hall.

The concert, supported by the Denis and Verna Adam of the Adam Foundation, and Christopher Marshall, showcased six cellists, all prize-winners from previous festivals, who came together to celebrate the festivals and their own achievements.

Featured cellists were Yoosha (Yoon-Jung) Kim (NZ/UK), Alice Neary (UK), László Fenyö (Hungary/Germany), Wolfgang Schmidt (Germany), Li-Wei Qin (Australia/UK), and Monika Leskovar (Croatia/Germany).

== Bibliography ==
- Howard Smith, New Zealand Cellofest, The Strad, December 1995, Vol.106, No.1268. Orpheus Publications Ltd.
- New cello capital for the world?, The Press, 1997 June 18, p. 16.
- Cellists gather for Chch festival, The Press, 1997 June 21, p. 4.
- Timothy Jones, Adam Cello Competition gala, The Press, 1997 July 1, p. 38.
- David Cell, Chance to hear some of world's finest cellists, The Press, 1997 July 2, p. 14.
- Robert Markow, The Adam's Competition Report, The Strad, October 2006, Vol.117, No.1398. Orpheus Publications / Newsguest Specialist Media Ltd.
