= Krettly Quartet =

The Krettly Quartet was a French string quartet musical ensemble active during the 1920s and 1930s. Its repertoire included avant-garde and modern works, and the group made early recordings of some of these.

== Personnel ==
1st violin

- Robert Krettly

2nd violin

- René Costard (retired 1935)

viola

- Georges Taine (active 1925)
- François Broos (active 1931-35)

'cello

- Pierre Fournier (before 1929)
- André Navarra (1929–1935)

== Origins and activities ==
The quartet took its name from the leader, the violinist Robert Krettly (b. 1891), who was the brother of the cellist Odette Krettly (one of the teachers of Pierre Fournier (1906–1986)).

Robert Krettly took part in the premiere of the Gabriel Fauré Pianoforte Trio in D minor op 120, in Paris on 12 May 1923, with Jacques Patté (cello) and Tatiana Sanzévitch (piano). The quartet was in existence in March 1925, with Fournier as its cellist aged 19, when they premiered the string quartet by Catherine Murphy Urner at the Salle Pleyel, Paris. This formation therefore preceded the appearance of Robert Krettly as second violin, with Jacques Thibaud (1st violin), Maurice Vieux (1884–1951) (viola) and André Hekking (cello), in the premiere of the Gabriel Fauré string quartet (in E minor, op 121) at the Société Nationale de Musique in Paris on 12 June 1925. Fournier had also studied with André Hekking, and with Lucien Capet.

In 1929 Andre Navarra (1911–1988) replaced Pierre Fournier as cellist, and by 1931 François Broos had replaced Georges Taine at the viola desk. Navarra made his debut as a soloist in 1931, at the Concerts Colonne in Paris. Both Navarra and René Costard retired from the group in 1935, and in that year Costard established the French branch of Foldex maps.

== Recordings ==
The Krettly Quartet made some significant recordings before 1936, including principally:

- Gabriel Fauré, String Quartet in E minor op 121,
- Maurice Ravel, String Quartet in F major,
- Arthur Honegger, String Quartet,
- Darius Milhaud, String Quartet no 2 (Atonal),
- Alexander Borodin, String Quartet no 3, Notturno
- Igor Strawinsky, Trois piéces pour quatuor a cordes
