= Carter Brey =

American cello virtuoso

- Born: September 19, 1954 (age 71); Montclair, New Jersey
- Occupation: Classical cellist
- Organizations: New York Philharmonic; Curtis Institute of Music

Carter Brey (born 1954) is an American cellist. He had a solo career from 1981 until 1996 when he became the principal cellist of the New York Philharmonic.

== Biography ==
Carter Brey was born in Montclair, New Jersey and grew up in Westchester County, New York. He began playing the violin at age 9 and the cello at age 12 in school, although he did not seriously consider becoming a professional musician until he was 16. He studied under Laurence Lesser and Stephen Kates at Johns Hopkins University's Peabody Institute, from which he graduated in 1976. He continued his studies with Aldo Parisot at Yale University, where he was a Wardell Fellow and a Houpt Scholar. He taught at the University of South Florida in between his time at Peabody and Yale. In 1979, he joined the Cleveland Orchestra where he played for two seasons.

Brey came to international attention in 1981 when he won the 3rd Prize of the Rostropovich International Cello Competition, which led to his playing the Robert Schumann Cello Concerto under the baton of Mstislav Rostropovich with the National Symphony Orchestra in 1983. In 1982 he won the Young Concert Artists International Auditions, which led to his New York City recital debut at the 92nd Street Y. These competition wins kick-started his career as a cello soloist and he has since performed with almost every major symphony orchestra in the United States under such conductors as Claudio Abbado, Lorin Maazel, Kurt Masur, Semyon Bychkov, Sergiu Comissiona, and Christoph von Dohnanyi.

As a chamber musician, Brey has performed with the Tokyo String Quartet, the Emerson String Quartet, New York Youth Symphony, and the Chamber Music Society of Lincoln Center. He has performed at the Spoleto festivals in the United States and Italy, the Santa Fe Chamber Music Festival, the La Jolla Chamber Music Festival and elsewhere. Brey joined the faculty of the Curtis Institute of Music in 2008 and held the Nina and Billy Albert Chair in Cello Studies until the end of the 2020-2021 academic year.

Brey lives in New York City. In March 2026, Brey announced his intention to retire from the New York Philharmonic as of summer 2026. His final performance with the New York Philharmonic will be July 29 during their residency at the Bravo! Vail Festival in Colorado.
