= Wolfgang Emanuel Schmidt =

German cellist and conductor

Wolfgang Emanuel Schmidt (born 18 December 1971) is a German cellist, conductor and academic teacher.

== Life and career ==
Schmidt was born in Freiburg im Breisgau on 18 December 1971. He studied at the Musikhochschule Lübeck with David Geringas and the Juilliard School in New York City with Aldo Parisot. During his studies, he received the Grand Prix de la Ville de Paris and also the prize for contemporary music at the Concours de violoncelle Rostropovitch, with the jury presided by Mstislav Rostropovich. He also achieved the first prize of Deutscher Musikwettbewerb in Bonn, the first prize of the International Australasian Cello Competition in New Zealand, as well as prizes at the International Tchaikovsky Competition in Moscow and the International Leonard Rose Cello Competition in the US.

Schmidt has given concerts in Europa, Russia and the US. He has played as soloist with the Gewandhausorchester, the Rundfunk-Sinfonieorchester Berlin, the NDR Radiophilharmonie, the Philharmonisches Staatsorchester Hamburg, the Sinfonia Varsovia, the Orchestre philharmonique de Radio France, the Tokyo Symphony Orchestra, the Baltimore Symphony Orchestra, the Houston Symphony, the Saint Paul Chamber Orchestra and the Prague Philharmonia. He collaborated with conductors including Gerd Albrecht, Jiří Bělohlávek, Andrey Boreyko, Charles Dutoit, Gabriel Feltz, Rafael Frühbeck de Burgos, Marek Janowski, Eivind Gullberg Jensen, Nicholas Milton, Markus Poschner Donald Runnicles, Yutaka Sado, Michael Sanderling, Vassily Sinaisky, and Hugh Wolff. He played at festivals such as Ludwigsburg Festival, Rheingau Musik Festival and the Schleswig-Holstein Musik Festival, where he played with Christoph Eschenbach.

Schmidt is also activ in chamber music, playing with Emanuel Ax, Isabelle Faust, Miriam Fried, Leonidas Kavakos, Lang Lang, Edgar Meyer, Gil Shaham, David Shifrin, Kyoko Takezawa, and Nikolaj Znaider. He was a member of the Chamber Music Society of Lincoln Center in New York City. He formed with cellist Jens Peter Maintz the duo Cello Duello. He played in world premieres of music by Fabrice Bollon, and Søren Nils Eichberg, Christian Jost, Esa-Pekka Salonen, Alfred Schnittke.

Schmidt performed in the Berliner Philharmonie, the Alte Oper in Frankfurt, the Gasteig and the Herkulessaal in Munich, the Kennedy Center in Washington, D.C., Carnegie Hall and Alice Tully Hall in New York City, the Théâtre du Châtelet and Théâtre des Champs-Élysées in Paris, Wigmore Hall in London, Mariinski Theatre in St. Petersburg, Rudolfinum in Prague and the Suntory Hall in Tokyo.

He recorded a first CD in 2001. French Impressions. He recorded Prokofiev's Cello Concerto in 2004, followed by Schumann's Cello Concerto and Elgar's Cello Concerto in 2008. He also recorded Bloch's Voice in the Wilderness with Deutsches Symphonie-Orchester Berlin.

He founded a chamber orchestra, Metamorphosen Berlin, in 2010, and recorded with them works by Dvořák, Josef Suk and Tchaikovsky. They have played concerts in Europe, residing at the Konzerthaus Berlin.

In 2013, he earned a Preis der Deutschen Schallplattenkritik and a Diapason d’or for his recordings of Weber's Piano Quartet, with Isabelle Faust, Boris Faust and Alexander Melnikov.

Schmidt plays a cello by Matteo Gofriller, formerly owned by Hugo Becker.

Schmidt has been professor of cello at the University of Music Franz Liszt Weimar, the Berlin University of the Arts, and at the Kronberg Academy from 2017.
