= Marie-Elisabeth Hecker =

German cellist

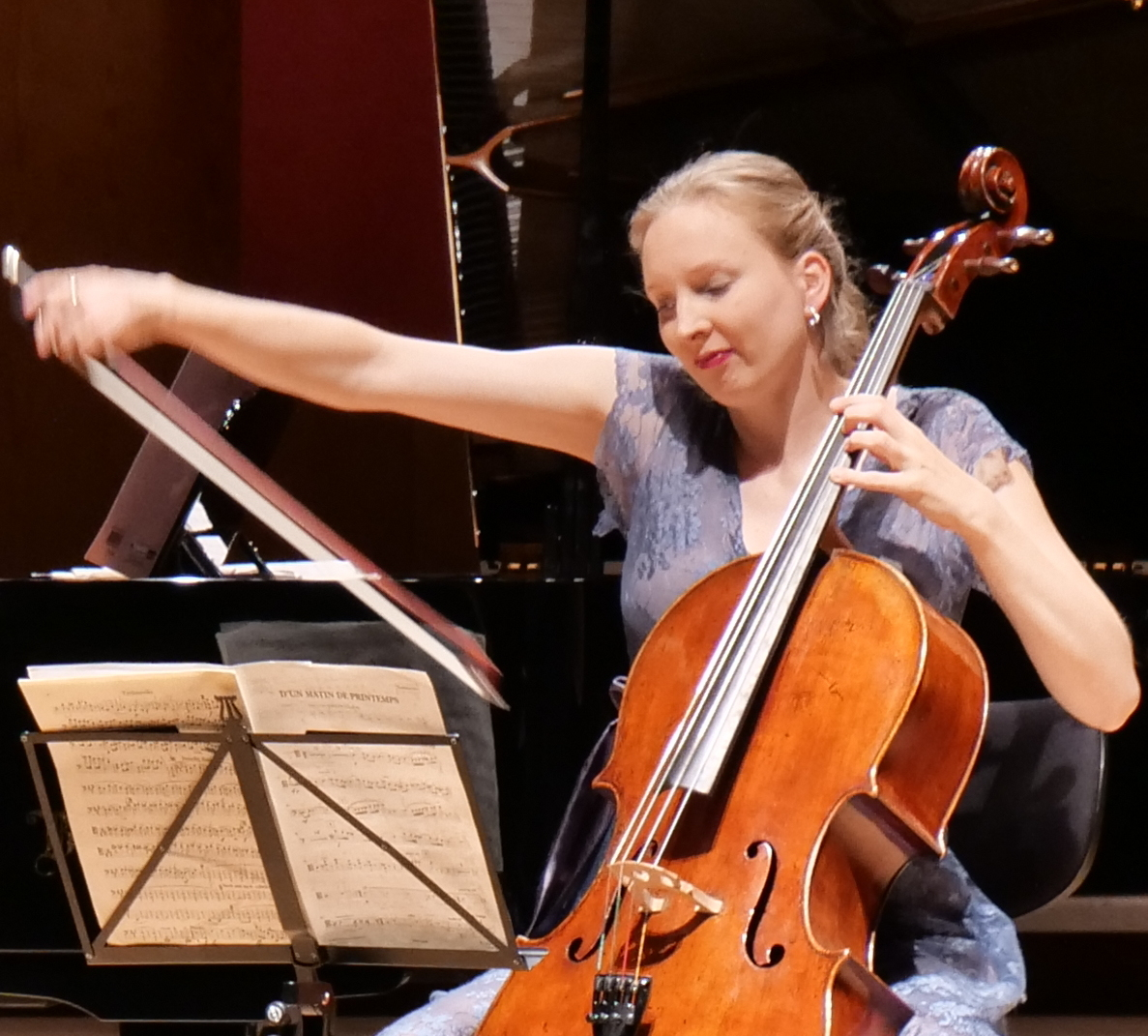
- Born: 5 March 1987 (age 39); Zwickau, East Germany
- Education: University of Music and Theatre Leipzig
- Occupation: Classical cellist
- Awards: Concours de violoncelle Rostropovitch

Marie-Elisabeth Hecker (born 5 March 1987 in Zwickau) is a German cellist. In 2005 she was one of the youngest participants to win first prize at the Concours de violoncelle Rostropovitch, the most important cello competition held every four years in Paris.

== Career ==
Hecker is the fifth of eight children of a pastor's family from Kirchberg near Zwickau. Already at the age of five her passion for cello developed. In 1992 she began to study this instrument with Wieland Pörner at the Robert-Schumann-Konservatorium Zwickau.

In 1999 she won several competitions of Jugend musiziert; in 2001 the first prize and special prize at the international J. J. F. Dotzauer competition in Dresden. From 2001 to 2005 she was taught by Professor Peter Bruns in cello and piano trio as an external pupil of the Sächsisches Landesgymnasium für Musik Carl Maria von Weber and since 2005 as a student of the University of Music and Theatre Leipzig. She participated several times in chamber music courses and master classes.

Hecker is one of the 23 young instrumentalists who were invited by the Kronberg Academy (Kronberg, Taunus) to work with the masters of their subjects at the Chamber Music Days for two weeks.

From the 2009/10 to 2011/12 season, Hecker was an artist in the "Junge Wilde" series at the Theater Dortmund.

On 8 June 2010 she played Schumann's Cello Concerto, Op. 129, accompanied by the Staatskapelle Berlin under the baton of Daniel Barenboim, in the context of a much acclaimed gala concert in the Zwickauer Konzertsaal Neue Welt on the occasion of Robert Schumann's 200th birthday.

Hecker is married to the pianist Martin Helmchen, and mother of three daughters.
