= Cello Concerto (Schumann) =

Musical work by Robert Schumann

- by Robert Schumann
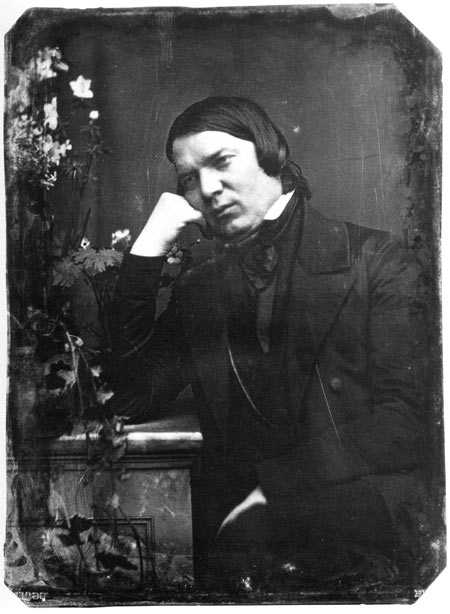
- Daguerreotype of Schumann, 1850
- Key: A minor
- Opus: 129
- Composed: October 1850
- Duration: 25 minutes
- Movements: 3
- Scoring: Solo cello and orchestra

Premiere
- Date: 23 April 1860
- Location: Oldenburg
- Performers: Ludwig Ebert

The Cello Concerto in A minor, Op. 129, by Robert Schumann was completed in a period of only two weeks, between 10 October and 24 October 1850, shortly after Schumann became the music director at Düsseldorf.

The concerto was never played in Schumann's lifetime. It was premiered on 23 April 1860, four years after his death, in Oldenburg, with Ludwig Ebert as soloist.

The length of a typical performance is about 25 minutes.

== Instrumentation ==
The work is scored for solo cello, two flutes, two oboes, two clarinets, two bassoons, two horns, two trumpets, timpani, and strings.

== Structure ==
Written late in his short life, the concerto is considered one of Schumann's more enigmatic works due to its structure, the length of the exposition, and the transcendental quality of the opening as well as the intense lyricism of the second movement. On the autograph score, Schumann gave the title Konzertstück (concert piece) rather than Konzert (concerto), which suggested he intended to depart from the traditional conventions of a concerto from the beginning.

Consistent with many of Schumann's other works, the concerto utilizes both fully realized and fragmentary thematic material introduced in the first movement, material which is then quoted and developed throughout. Together with the concerto's relatively short, linked movements, the concerto is thus very unified both in material and in character, although the work's emotional scope is wide. Schumann's use of the same themes in different contexts and moods lends the concerto a strong sense of character development and an extended emotional arc, from its opening measures vacillating between deeply meditative and agitated to the brilliant, affirmative conclusion.

The concerto is in three movements:

1. Nicht zu schnell (A minor – A major)
2. Langsam (F major)
3. Sehr lebhaft (A minor – A major)

=== I. Nicht zu schnell ===
The first movement begins with a very short orchestral introduction followed by the presentation of the main theme by the soloist, which in turn is followed by a short tutti that leads into additional melodic material that is both new and related to what has preceded it. In this way, the character of the work is one of improvisation and fantasy, although much of the recapitulation follows the exposition fairly closely.

=== II. Langsam ===
In the brief, intensely melodic second movement, the soloist occasionally uses double stops. It also features a descending fifth, a gesture used throughout the piece as a signal and homage to his wife, Clara Schumann – this motive was used to the same end in his first piano sonata. Also, the soloist has a duet with the principal cellist, a very unusual texture; some have suggested this could be interpreted as a conversation between Clara and the composer while a more pragmatic explanation is that Schumann extends the normal harmonic, dynamic, and expressive range of the solo cello by adding the additional accompanying material thus resulting in the impression of a larger, more fully realized solo instrument.

=== III. Sehr lebhaft ===
The third movement is a lighter, yet resolute sonata-form movement, and here Schumann utilizes the timpani for the first time in the work, adding to the main theme's march-like character. At the end of the movement, there is an accompanied cadenza, something unprecedented in Schumann's day; this cadenza leads into the final coda in which Schumann returns to A-major. During the twentieth century and before, some cellists have chosen instead to include their own unaccompanied cadenza (e.g. Pau Casals, Emanuel Feuermann, etc.), although there is no indication that Schumann wished for one.

Schumann famously abhorred applause between movements. As a result, there are no breaks between any of the movements in the concerto. As for the concerto's virtuosity, Schumann earlier in his life declared "I cannot write a concerto for the virtuoso; I must think of something else." In the cello concerto, while exploiting the instrument to the fullest, the writing for the soloist generally avoids virtuosic display prominent in many concertos of the time.

== Reception ==
Although the cello concerto is now performed with some regularity, the work spent many decades in obscurity, virtually unknown. Schumann was unable to secure a premiere of the work and initial reactions to his score were mostly very negative. This may have been in part due to the work's unusual structure as well as the personal, inward nature of the music and the lack of passages written to display the technical skill of the cello soloist. While criticism of the work persists, some cellists place the Schumann concerto alongside the cello concertos of Dvořák and Elgar in a group of great Romantic works for their instrument.

== Arrangements ==
Schumann created a version for violin and orchestra for Joseph Joachim to play. Dmitri Shostakovich re-orchestrated the cello concerto in 1963 as his opus 125.

== Recordings ==
=== 20th century ===
- 1930: Gregor Piatigorsky, London Philharmonic Orchestra, John Barbirolli, Naxos, Warner
- 1942: Tibor de Machula, Berlin Philharmonic, Wilhelm Furtwängler, Deutsche Grammophon
- 1950: Gaspar Cassadó, Radio-Sinfonieorchester Stuttgart, Hans Müller-Kray
- 1953: Pablo Casals, The Prades Festival Orchestra, Eugene Ormandy, Sony
- 1953: Maurice Gendron, Orchestre de la Suisse Romande, Ernest Ansermet
- 1953: Daniil Shafran, Russian State Symphony Orchestra, Kirill Kondrashin
- 1955: Paul Tortelier, MDR Leipzig Radio Symphony Orchestra, Hermann Abendroth, Berlin Classics – September 5, 1955
- 1960: Pierre Fournier, Philharmonia Orchestra, Sir Malcolm Sargent, EMI
- 1960: Zara Nelsova, Radio-Symphonie-Orchester Berlin, Georg Ludwig Jochum, Audite
- 1960: Mstislav Rostropovich, Leningrad Philharmonic Orchestra, Gennady Rozhdestvensky, Deutsche Grammophon – September 12, 1960
- 1961: Leonard Rose, New York Philharmonic, Leonard Bernstein, Columbia
- 1962: Vladimir Orloff, Bucharest Symphony Orchestra, Mircea Cristescu
- 1962: János Starker, London Symphony Orchestra, Stanisław Skrowaczewski, Decca – July 10, 1962
- 1964: André Navarra, Czech Philharmonic Orchestra, Karel Ančerl, Epic Records
- 1968: Jacqueline du Pré, New Philharmonia Orchestra, Daniel Barenboim, Warner – May 11, 1968
- 1976: Mstislav Rostropovich, Orchestre National de France, Leonard Bernstein, EMI (Grammy Award nomination)
- 1981: Lynn Harrell, The Cleveland Orchestra, Sir Neville Marriner, Decca
- 1986: Mischa Maisky, Vienna Philharmonic, Leonard Bernstein, Deutsche Grammophon
- 1988: Heinrich Schiff, Berlin Philharmonic, Bernard Haitink, Philips
- 1988: Yo-Yo Ma, Bavarian Radio Symphony Orchestra, Colin Davis, Sony
- 1991: Natalia Gutman, London Philharmonic, Kurt Masur, EMI
- 1994: Julius Berger (cellist), Südwestfälische Philharmonie, Florian Merz, Bayer Records, Germany / Brilliant classics – August–September 1994
- 1996: Steven Isserlis, Deutsche Kammerphilharmonie Bremen, Christoph Eschenbach – June 15, 1996
- 1997: Mischa Maisky, Orpheus Chamber Orchestra, Deutsche Grammophon – March 26, 1997

=== 21st century ===
- 2002: Jan Vogler, Münchener Kammerorchester, Christoph Poppen, Berlin Classics
- 2005: Truls Mørk, Orchestre Philharmonique de Radio France, Paavo Jarvi, Erato
- 2006: Alban Gerhardt, Rundfunk-Sinfonieorchester Berlin, Hannu Lintu, Hyperion
- 2006: Natalia Gutman, Mahler Chamber Orchestra, Claudio Abbado, Deutsche Grammophon
- 2008: Raphael Wallfisch, Pforzheim Chamber Orchestra, Niklas Willén, Nimbus Records
- 2009: Daniel Müller-Schott, NDR Symphony Orchestra, Christoph Eschenbach, Naxos
- 2016: Jean-Guihen Queyras, Freiburger Barockorchester, Pablo Heras-Casado, Harmonia Mundi
- 2018: Gautier Capuçon, Chamber Orchestra of Europe, Bernard Haitink, Erato
- 2018: Sol Gabetta, Kammerorchester Basel, Giovanni Antonini, Sony Classical (Instrumentalist of the Year, Opus Klassik Awards 2019)
- 2020: Raphaela Gromes, Berlin Radio Symphony Orchestra, Nicholas Carter, Sony
- 2024: Christian-Pierre La Marca, Philharmonia Orchestra, Raphaël Merlin, Naïve Records – July 19, 2024
