= Les Heures persanes =

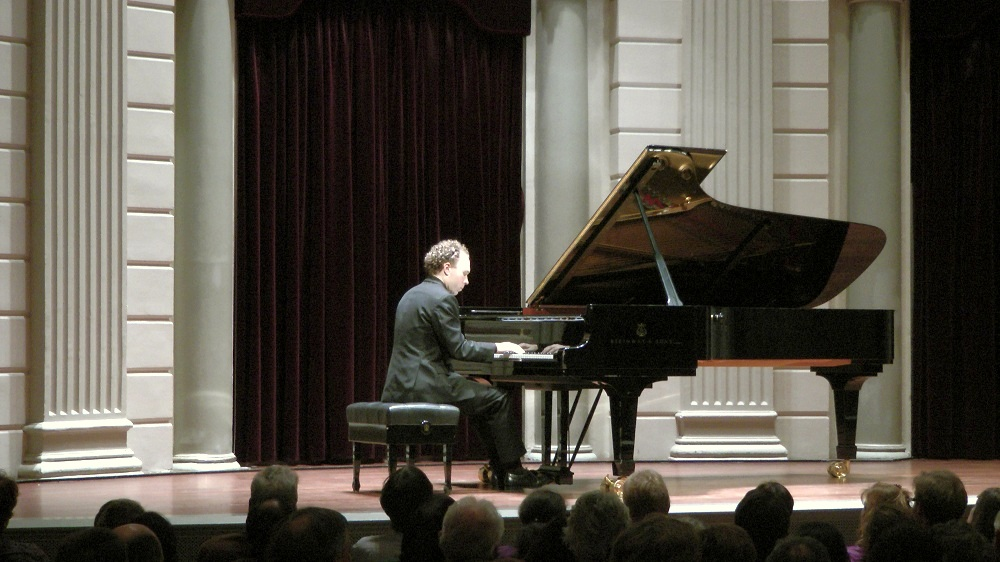
Ralph van Raat performs Persian Hours at Concertgebouw Amsterdam, Nov. 2012

Les Heures persanes (English: The Persian Hours), Op. 65, is one of the most famous works of the French composer Charles Koechlin.

It is based on the French novelist and traveller Pierre Loti’s Vers Ispahan, detailing his journey across Persia. Koechlin's hour-long work is a series of pieces – condensed into just two-and-a-half days – that captures and distils the scents and sounds of this faraway land.

The Persian Hours includes 16 pieces for piano composed between 1913 and 1919. Koechlin prepared an orchestral version of the piece as well.

The Persian Hours is a difficult work to record. It is an atmospheric work, mostly very slow and dreamy, and except for three or four movements (Travers les Rues; the mini-tone-poem Le Conteur; and the final Dervishes dans la nuit) is often extremely quiet. The orchestration is delicate and subtle, and it is entirely typical of Koechlin that although the piece is harmonically extremely audacious for its time (1913–19), the music is so subdued that its frequent polytonal or atonal basis might not be immediately apparent.

== Movements ==
1. Sieste, avant le depart [Sleep before departure]
2. La caravane (reve, pendant la sieste) [The caravan (dreaming while sleeping)]
3. L’escalade obscure [Dark escalation]
4. Matin frais, dans la haute vallee [Cool morning in the upper valley]
5. En vue de la ville [In view of the city]
6. A travers les rues [Through the streets]
7. Chant du soir [Evening song]
8. Clair de lune sur les terrasses [Moonlight on the terraces]
9. Aubade
10. Roses au soleil de midi [Roses in the midday sun]
11. A l'ombre, pres de la fontaine de marbre [Near the marble fountain]
12. Arabesques
13. Les collines, au coucher du soleil [The hills at sunset]
14. Le conteur [The storyteller]
15. La paix du soir, au cimetiere [Evening peace at the cemetery]
16. Derviches dans la nuit — Clair de lune sur la place deserte [Dervishes at night — Moonlight on the deserted square]

== Instrumentation ==
The orchestral version of Les Heures persanes is scored for a small orchestra consisting of:

Woodwinds

2 flutes (2nd doubling piccolo)
1 oboe
cor anglais (doubling oboe 2)
2 A clarinets
2 bassoons

Brass

2 horns
2 trumpets

Percussion

timpani
cymbals
tenor drum
glockenspiel

piano
celesta
harp

Strings
