= Vančo Čavdarski =

- Ванчо Чавдарски
- Born: March 3, 1930; Vladimirovo, Kingdom of Yugoslavia
- Died: December 8, 2001 (aged 71); Brisbane, Australia
- Spouse: Elisabeth
- Children: Igor and Alex

Vančo Čavdarski (March 3, 1930 - December 8, 2001) was a Yugoslavian conductor.

== Education ==
Čavdarski earned his degree in conducting from the Belgrade Music Academy under the mentorship of Professor Živojin Zdravković, subsequently pursuing advanced specialization in Germany and the United States. His artistic career began in the late 1930s in Vladimirovo, near Berovo, and progressed through Skopje and Belgrade, where he completed his formal education, before undertaking further professional development in conducting abroad.

== Career ==
From 1960 to 1970, he served as a conductor at the Opera of the Macedonian National Theater (MNT), where he staged numerous operatic productions. During this period, from 1965 to 1970, he also held the position of Director of the Macedonian Philharmonic. In 1982, Čavdarski was appointed Chief Conductor of the Symphony Orchestra of Radio Television Belgrade. He later continued his work in England and eventually returned to Macedonia to conduct again at the Opera of the Macedonian National Theater. Between 1994 and 2001, he was an Honorary Professor at the South Korean Conservatory in Seoul. In 1970, he began an international phase of his career, securing long-term engagements as a conductor in several countries. He led the Christchurch Civic Orchestra in New Zealand beginning in 1972, the Tasmanian Symphony Orchestra from 1974 to 1980, and the Queensland Symphony Orchestra in Australia from 1978 to 1982. From 1993 to 1996, he served as conductor of the Busan Philharmonic Orchestra in South Korea. In addition to these roles, he appeared as a guest conductor in the United States, Venezuela, Italy, and Spain.

Throughout his distinguished career, Čavdarski developed an extensive repertoire spanning symphonic, operatic, and ballet works. His operatic credits include Aida, Un ballo in maschera, The Abduction from the Seraglio, Pagliacci, The Barber of Seville, and The Merry Widow, while his ballet repertoire featured works such as The Firebird, Vibrations, and Giselle.

== Death ==
Čavdarski died in Brisbane, Australia, on December 8, 2001.

== Selected discography and recordings ==
Čavdarski's recorded legacy includes a diverse range of works spanning oratorio, opera, symphonic, and choral music. His collaborations with leading orchestras and soloists are preserved in the following notable recordings:

- 1967 – Toma Prošev – Sun on the Ancient Land (Oratorio), Jugoton
- 1973 – Giacomo Puccini – La Bohème
- 1973 – Jenny McLeod – Cambridge Suite for Orchestra
- 1973 – Giuseppe Verdi – Macbeth (Act IV: "O figli miei! ... Ah, la paterna mano"), with tenor Donald Smith and the Tasmanian Symphony Orchestra
- 1975 – Donald Smith Sings, with Donald Smith and the Tasmanian Symphony Orchestra
- 1976 – The Sound of Rosny, featuring The Rosny Children's Choir, conducted by Jennifer Filby with the Tasmanian Symphony Orchestra
- 1980 – Sir William Walton, Melbourne Symphony Orchestra, Vančo Čavdarski, Daphne Harris, Gregory Yurisich, Noel Mangin – The Bear
- 1980 - Melbourne Symphony Orchestra, Hiroyuki Iwaki, Vanco Cavdarski* – Untitled
- 1982 – Jan Sedivka, Larry Sitsky, Tasmanian Symphony Orchestra Conducted by Vanco Cavdarski* – Jan Sedivka Plays Sitsky
- 1983 – Vitomir Trifunovic - Symphony No. 2, Belgrade Radio & Television Symphony Orchestra, Vanco Cavdarski and и 15 other recordings
- 1986 – Respighi, Werner Andreas Albert, Vanco Cavdarski, Margreta Elkins, Robert Boughen, Edward Elgar, Queensland Symphony Orchestra
- 1991 – Norman, Philip: Mists over Hagley; for violin and orchestra / performed by the Christchurch Symphony Orchestra with the Christchurch Youth Orchestra and Adele Anthony (violin) conducted by Vanco Cavdarski
- 1994 – Organ Spectacular, Robert Boughen, Michael Dudman, David Rumsey, Queensland Symphony Orchestra, Sydney Symphony Orchestra, Students of Newcastle University Conservatorium, Vanco Cavdarski, Patrick Thomas, Leonard Dommett
- 2003 – My First Ballet Album, Tchaikovsky: Swan Lake, Op.20, TH.12/ Act 1 & 2, Sydney Symphony Orchestra, Vanco Cavdarski

== Awards and recognitions ==
He won second prize at the International Young Conductors Competition in Liverpool, England. From 1965 to 1970.

For his conducting art, Maestro Čavdarski has been awarded in the country and abroad, and the Jean Philippe Rameau medal of the city of Dijon in France stands out. He has conducted top European and world orchestras, and on all continents, achieving top results.

In Vladimirovo, in April 2025, the "Vančo Čavdarski" festival hall was officially opened. At the event, a concert was held by the "Skopje Soloists" chamber orchestra and oboist Vasil Atanasov, accompanied by baritone Boris Trajanov, and the audience enjoyed performances of works by European and Macedonian composers under the baton of Angel Spirovski.
