= Catherine Murphy Urner =

American classical composer

- Born: March 23, 1891; Mitchell, Indiana
- Died: April 30, 1942 (aged 51); San Diego, California
- Education: Goucher College, Miami University, and University of California at Berkeley

Catherine Murphy Urner Shatto (March 23, 1891 – April 30, 1942) was an American composer.

== Early life and education ==
Catherine Murphy Urner was born in Mitchell, Indiana, the third of seven children of Southern Illinois Normal College principal Edward Everett Urner (later a Methodist minister) and writer Jessie Robertson Urner.

She studied piano, voice and composition at Goucher College in Baltimore, Maryland, Peabody Conservatory and Miami University in Oxford, Ohio, graduating with a Bachelor of Arts degree in 1912. She continued her studies at the University of California at Berkeley where she was the first to win the George Ladd Prix de Paris for composition in 1918. Later in 1918, Koechlin was in San Francisco as part of Theodore Reinach's French cultural mission, where William McCoy recommended Urner as a student. The Prize enabled her to move to Paris to study with Charles Koechlin from 1919 to 1921. She returned to Paris intermittently during the period from 1923–1926 to resume composition studies with Koechlin as well as vocal study with Mademoiselle Andree d'Otemar.

== Career ==
Urner worked as a professor and director of vocal music at Mills College in Oakland, California from 1921 to 1924. After leaving Mills College, she devoted her time to performing, composing and touring in the U.S. and Europe with the assistance of Charles Koechlin. She also collected Native American tribal melodies which she incorporated into her compositions. Her first string quartet premiered in 1925 at Salle Pleyel in Paris, by the Krettly Quartet with 17-year-old cellist, Pierre Fournier. The program also included vocal renditions of compositions by Koechlin, Debussy, Brahms, Shubert and songs she had composed. She arranged for Koechlin to teach a course at the University of California in 1928, and afterward lived with Koechlin in Paris until 1933, collaborating on a number of works. Their musical collaboration was also one of intimacy and deep admiration. In 1937, she returned to California and married organist and composer Charles Rollins Shatto (1908–1983).

== Death and legacy ==
She died in San Diego, and her papers are housed at the University of California, Berkeley Jean Gray Hargrove Music Library.

== Works ==
Her archived works include over eighty songs, a number of Native American songs, twenty-four choral works and eight orchestral works. Selected compositions include:

- The Bride of a God with Charles Koechlin
- Come Away, Death
- Song of the Sea
- Song from "April"
- Le Papillon
- Quatre Melodies, collection of songs
- Ici-bas
- Colloque Sentimental
