= Charles Koechlin =

French composer and musicologist (1867–1950)

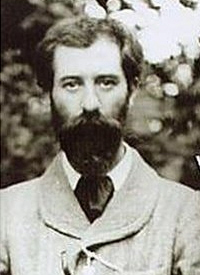
- Born: 27 November 1867; Paris, France
- Died: 31 December 1950 (aged 83); Le Canadel, Var
- Occupations: Composer; teacher; musicologist
- Works: List of compositions

Charles-Louis-Eugène Koechlin (French: [ʃaʁl lwi øʒɛn keklɛ̃]; 27 November 1867 – 31 December 1950), commonly known as Charles Koechlin, was a French composer, teacher and musicologist. Among his better known works is Les Heures persanes, a set of piano pieces based on the novel Vers Ispahan by Pierre Loti and The Seven Stars Symphony, a 7 movement symphony where each movement is themed around a different film star (all Silent era stars) who were popular at the time of the piece's writing (1933).

He was a political radical all his life and a passionate enthusiast for such diverse things as medieval music, The Jungle Book of Rudyard Kipling, Johann Sebastian Bach, film stars (especially Lilian Harvey and Ginger Rogers), traveling, stereoscopic photography and socialism. He once said: "The artist needs an ivory tower, not as an escape from the world, but as a place where he can view the world and be himself. This tower is for the artist like a lighthouse shining out across the world."

== Life and career ==
Charles Koechlin was born in Paris and baptized Charles-Louis-Eugène Koechlin. He was the youngest child of a large family. His mother's family came from Alsace and he identified with that region; his maternal grandfather had been the noted philanthropist and textile manufacturer Jean Dollfus, and Koechlin inherited his strongly developed social conscience. His father died when he was 14.

Despite an early interest in music, his family wanted him to become an engineer. He entered the École Polytechnique in 1887 but the following year was diagnosed with tuberculosis and had to spend six months recuperating in Algeria. He ended up having to do his first year at the École over again and graduated with only mediocre grades.

After a struggle with his family and private lessons with Charles-Édouard Lefebvre he entered the Paris Conservatoire in 1890, studying first with Antoine Taudou for harmony. In 1892, he started studying composition with Jules Massenet, fugue and counterpoint with André Gedalge, and music history with Louis Bourgault-Ducoudray. His fellow students included George Enescu, Ernest Le Grand, Reynaldo Hahn, Max d'Ollone, Henri Rabaud and Florent Schmitt. From 1896, he was a student of Gabriel Fauré, along with Maurice Ravel and Jean Roger-Ducasse. Fauré had a great influence on Koechlin, who wrote the first Fauré biography (1927), which is still referred to. In 1898, a grateful Koechlin orchestrated the popular suite from Fauré's Pelléas et Mélisande and in 1900 assisted Fauré in producing the huge open-air drama Promethée.

After his graduation, Koechlin became a freelance composer and teacher. He married Suzanne Pierrard in 1903. They had five children. Their son Yves later married Paul Langevin's granddaughter Noémie. Beginning in 1921, he regularly corresponded with Catherine Murphy Urner, a former student of his who lived in California. In 1909, he began regular work as a critic for the Chronique des Arts and in 1910 was one of the founders, with Ravel, of the Société musicale indépendante, with whose activities he was intensely associated.

From its inception in the early 1930s to his death, he was a passionate supporter of the International Society for Contemporary Music, eventually becoming President of its French section,. From 1937, he was elected President of the Fédération Musicale Populaire. At first comfortably off, he divided his time between Paris and country homes in Villers-sur-Mer and the Côte d'Azur, but after the onset of World War I his circumstances were gradually reduced; he had to sell one of his houses even after inheriting his mother's finances, making him work as a lecturer and teacher in 1915. Partly because of his constant advocacy of younger composers and new styles, he was never successful in his attempts to gain a permanent teaching position for himself, though he was an examiner for many institutions (e.g. the Conservatoires of Brussels, Reims and Marseille). His application to be professor of counterpoint and fugue at the Paris Conservatoire in 1926 was rejected 20 votes to 2 (the two being Albert Roussel and Maurice Emmanuel), but from 1935 to 1939 he was allowed to teach fugue and modal polyphony at the Schola Cantorum de Paris.

He visited the US four times to lecture and teach: in 1918–19, 1928, 1929 and 1937. On the second and third visits he taught at the University of California, Berkeley, through arrangements made by Catherine Murphy Urner, who afterward lived with him until 1933. On the 1929 visit his symphonic poem La Joie païenne won the Hollywood Bowl Prize for Composition and was performed there under the baton of Eugene Goossens. Even so, Koechlin had to pay for the preparation of orchestral parts, and in the 1930s he sank most of his savings into organizing performances of some of his orchestral works. In the 1940s, however, the music department of Belgian Radio took up his cause and broadcast several premieres of important scores including the first complete performance of the Jungle Book cycle.

He died aged 83 at his country home at Le Canadel, Var, and his body is buried there. Some of his papers are housed at the University of California at Berkeley Library, donated by Catherine Urmer's husband Charles Rollins Shatto. In 1940, the French government offered him the award of Chevalier de la Légion d'honneur, but he refused it.

== Music ==
Koechlin was enormously prolific, as the worklist below (by no means exhaustive) suggests. He was highly eclectic in inspiration (nature, the mysterious orient, French folksong, Bachian chorale, Hellenistic culture, astronomy, Hollywood movies, etc.) and musical technique, but the expressive core of his language remained distinct from those of his contemporaries. At the start of his career, he concentrated on songs with orchestral accompaniment, few of which were performed as intended during his lifetime. A 2006 recording of a selection (Hänssler Classic CD93.159) shows he was already master of an individual impressionism deriving less from Debussy than from Berlioz and Fauré. Thereafter he concentrated on symphonic poems, chamber and instrumental works.

After World War I, his continuing devotion to the symphonic poem and the large orchestra at a period when neoclassicism and small ensembles were more fashionable may have discouraged performance and acceptance of his works. His compositions include the four symphonic poems and three orchestral songs making up Livre de la jungle after Rudyard Kipling; many other symphonic poems including Le Buisson Ardent after Romain Rolland (this is a diptych of two orchestral poems, performable separately) and Le Docteur Fabricius after a novel by his uncle Charles Dollfus; three string quartets; five symphonies including a Seven Stars Symphony inspired by Hollywood; sonatas for flute, oboe, clarinet, bassoon, horn, violin, viola and cello, and much other chamber music; many songs, over two hundred opus numbers in all; and a vast number of monodies, fugal studies, chorale harmonizations and other educational pieces. Many works remain unpublished, however.

He wrote in several styles, sometimes strict Baroque counterpoint, as in the fugue that opens his Second Symphony, and sometimes "impressionistically", as in the tone poem Au Loin, or (though in more astringent fashion) in the scherzo of his Symphony No. 2. He could go from extreme simplicity to extreme complexity of texture and harmony from work to work, or within the same work. Some of his most characteristic effects come from a very static treatment of harmony, savouring the effect of, for instance, a stacked-up series of fifths through the whole gamut of the instruments. His melodies are often long, asymmetrical and wide-ranging in tessitura.

He was interested in the works of Schoenberg, some of which he quoted from memory in his treatise on orchestration. The twelve tone technique is one of the several modern music styles parodied in the 'Jungle Book' symphonic poem Les Bandar-Log, but Koechlin also wrote a few pieces in what he described as the 'style atonal-sériel'.

He was fascinated by the movies and wrote many 'imaginary' film scores and works dedicated to the Anglo-German actress Lilian Harvey, with whom he was infatuated. His Seven Stars Symphony features movements inspired by Douglas Fairbanks, Lilian Harvey, Greta Garbo, Clara Bow, Marlene Dietrich, Emil Jannings and Charlie Chaplin in some of their most famous film roles. He also composed an Epitaph for Jean Harlow and a suite of dances for Ginger Rogers.

He was interested in using unusual instruments, notably the saxophone and the early electronic instrument the Ondes Martenot. One movement of the Second Symphony requires four of them (and has not usually been included in the few performances of the work, for that reason). He also wrote several pieces for the hunting-horn, an instrument he himself played. Koechlin orchestrated several pieces by other composers. In addition to the Fauré Pelléas et Mélisande (suite mentioned above), he orchestrated the bulk of Claude Debussy's 'legende dansée' Khamma under the composer's direction, from the piano score, and orchestrated Cole Porter's ballet Within the Quota; other works he transcribed include Schubert's Wanderer Fantasy and Chabrier's Bourrée fantasque.

== As teacher and author ==
Koechlin began assisting Fauré in teaching fugue and counterpoint while he was still a student in the 1890s, but though he taught privately and was an external examiner for the Paris Conservatoire throughout his career, he never occupied a permanent salaried teaching position. Composers who studied with him included Germaine Tailleferre, Roger Désormière, Francis Poulenc and Henri Sauguet. Cole Porter studied orchestration with him in 1923–24. Darius Milhaud, though never a pupil, became a close friend and considered he learned more from Koechlin than any other pedagogue.

Koechlin wrote three compendious textbooks: one on Harmony (3 vols, 1923–26), one on Music Theory (1932–34) and a huge treatise on the subject of orchestration (4 vols, 1935–43) which is a classic treatment of the subject. This also reflects the writings of Paul Dukas, a composer who was particularly drawn to Koechlin's writings. For example, his book, "Trends of Contemporary Music", published in 1924, relates close in proximity with Koechlin's book, "Trends of Modern French Music", published the following year. While the two composers aren't directly correlated with one another, it can be observed that both composers were concerned with the defining trends of early 20th century composition as they both strived to set themselves apart. Koechlin's treatise uses examples from the orchestral repertoire of the late 19th and early 20th Centuries, in particular including examples form French composers, such as Saint-Saëns, Debussy, Chabrier, Bizet, Fauré, Ravel, and Koechlin himself.

Debussy chose Koechlin to complete the orchestration of his ballet Khamma. Koechlin completed this in 1913. Koechlin also wrote a number of smaller didactic works, as well as the life of Fauré mentioned above.

== List of compositions ==
=== Symphonies ===
- Symphony in A major (1893–1908, abandoned)
- Symphony No. 1, Op. 57bis (orchestral version, 1926, of String Quartet No. 2)
- The Seven Stars Symphony, Op. 132 (1933)
- Symphonie d’Hymnes (1936) [cycle of previously composed independent movements]
- Symphony No. 2, Op. 196 (1943–44)

=== Symphonic poems ===
- La Forêt, Op. 25 (1897–1906) &, Op. 29 (1896–1907)
- Nuit de Walpurgis classique, Op. 38 (1901–1916)
- Soleil et danses dans la forêt, Op. 43 No. 1 (1908–11)
- Vers la plage lointaine, nocturne, Op. 43 No. 2 (1908–1916)
- Le Printemps, Op. 47 No. 1 (1908–11)
- L'Hiver, Op. 47 No. 2 (1908–10 orch 1916)
- Nuit de Juin, Op. 48 No. 1 (1908–11 orch 1916)
- Midi en Août, Op. 48 No. 2 (1908–11 orch 1916)
- La Course de printemps, Op. 95 (1908–25) (Jungle Book Cycle)
- Vers la Voûte étoilée, Op. 129 (1923–33)
- Sur les flots lontains – poème symphonique sur un chant de C.M. Urner, Op. 130 (1933)
- La Méditation de Purun Bhaghat, Op. 159 (1936) (Jungle Book Cycle)
- La Cité nouvelle, rêve d’avenir, Op. 170 (1938; after H.G. Wells)
- La Loi de la Jungle, Op. 175 (1939–40) (Jungle Book Cycle)
- Les Bandar-log, Op. 176 (1939–40) (Jungle Book Cycle)
- Le Buisson ardent, Opp. 203 (1945) & 171 (1938)
- Le Docteur Fabricius, Op. 202 (1941–44, orch 1946)

=== Other orchestral works ===
- En rêve, Op. 20 No. 1 (1896–1900)
- Au loin, Op. 20 No. 2 (1896–1900)
- L’Automne, symphonic suite, Op. 30 (1896–1906)
- Études Antiques, Op. 46 (1908–10)
- Suite légendaire, Op. 54 (1901–15)
- 5 Chorals dans les modes du moyen-age, Op. 117 bis (1931 orch. 1932)
- Fugue Symphonique ‘Saint-Georges’, Op. 121 (1932)
- L’Andalouse dans Barcelone, Op. 134 (1933)
- Les Eaux vives – music for 1937 Paris Exposition Universelle, Op. 160 (1936)
- Victoire de la vie, Op. 167 (1938 – score for film by Henri Cartier)
- Offrande musicale sur le nom de BACH, Op. 187 (1942–46)
- Partita for chamber orchestra, Op. 205
- Introduction et 4 Interludes de style atonal-sériel, Op. 214 (1947–48)

=== Solo instrument and orchestra ===
- 3 Chorals for organ and orchestra, Op. 49 (1909–16)
- Ballade for piano and orchestra, Op. 50 (1911–19) (also for solo piano)
- Poème for horn and orchestra, Op. 70 bis (1927 orch of Horn Sonata)
- 2 Sonatas for clarinet and chamber orchestra, Opp. 85 bis & 86 bis (1946 arrs. of sonatas for clarinet and piano)
- 20 Chansons bretonnes for cello and orchestra, Op. 115 (1931–32) (arrs of 20 Chansons bretonnes for cello and piano)
- Silhouettes de Comédie for bassoon and orchestra, Op. 193
- 2 Sonatines for oboe d’amore and chamber orchestra, Op. 194 (1942–43)

=== Wind band ===
- Quelques chorals pour des fêtes populaires, Op. 153 (1935–36)

=== Chamber music ===
- Deux Nocturnes for flute, horn and piano, Op. 32bis (1897–1907)
  1. Venise (Andante con moto)
  2. Dans la forét (Adagio)
- Trois Pièces for bassoon and piano, Op. 34
- String Quartet No. 1, Op. 51 (1911–13)
- Sonata, flute and piano, Op. 52 (1913)
- Sonata, viola and piano, Op. 53
- Suite en quatuor pour flûte, violon, alto et piano, Op. 55 (1911–1916)
- String Quartet No. 2, Op. 57 (1911–15) [see also Symphony No. 1]
- Sonata, oboe and piano, Op. 58 (1911–16)
- Sonata, violin and piano, Op. 64 (1915–16)
- Paysages et Marines for chamber ensemble, Op. 63 (1915–16) [also arr. for piano solo]
- Sonata, cello and piano, Op. 66 (1917)
- Sonata, horn and piano, Op. 70 (1918–25)
- Sonata, bassoon and piano, Op. 71 (1918–1919)
- String Quartet No. 3, Op. 72 (1917–21)
- Sonata, 2 flutes, Op. 75 (1920)
- Sonata No. 1, clarinet and piano, Op. 85 (1923)
- Sonata No. 2, clarinet and piano, Op. 86 (1923)
- Trio for flute, clarinet and bassoon (or violin, viola and violoncello) (1927)
- Piano Quintet, Op. 80
- 20 Chansons bretonnes for cello and piano, Op. 115 (1931–32)
- L’Album de Lilian (Book I) for soprano, flute, clarinet, piano, Op. 139 (1934)
- L’Album de Lilian (Book II) for flute, piano, harpsichord, Ondes Martenot, Op. 149 (1935)
- Sonatine modale for clarinet and flute, Op. 155 (1935–36)
- Quintet No. 1 for flute, harp and string trio Primavera, Op. 156 (1936)
- 14 Pièces for flute and piano, Op. 157b (1936)
- Épitaphe de Jean Harlow for flute, alto saxophone and piano, Op. 164 (1937)
- Septet for wind instruments, Op. 165 (1937)
- 14 Pièces for clarinet and piano, Op. 178 (1942)
- 14 Pièces for oboe and piano, Op. 179 (1942)
- 15 Pièces for horn (or saxophone) and piano, Op. 180 (1942)
- 15 Études for saxophone and piano, Op. 188 (1942–44)
- 12 Monodies for Instruments, Op. 213 (1947)
  - First and Second for flute
  - Third and Fourth for oboe
  - Fifth and Sixth for clarinet
  - Seventh and Eighth for bassoon
  - Ninth for alto saxophone
  - Tenth for trombone
  - Eleventh for trumpet
  - Twelfth for horn
- Sonate à sept for flute, oboe, harp and string quartet, Op. 221
- Morceau de lecture pour la flûte, Op. 218 (1948)
- Quintet No. 2 for flute, harp and string trio Primavera II, Op. 223 (1949)
- Stèle funéraire for flute, piccolo and alto flute, Op. 224 (1950)
- Motets de style archaique, 15 pieces for various instruments, Op. 225 (1949)

=== Instrumental music ===
- Sonate für Oboe und Klavier, Op. 58
- 5 Sonatines for piano, Op. 59 (1915–16)
- 4 Sonatines Françaises for piano duet, Op. 60 (1919) [also version for orchestra]
- Paysages et Marines for piano, Op. 63 (1915–16) [also arr. chamber ensemble]
- Les Heures persanes, 16 pieces for piano, Op. 65 (1913–19) [also orchestral version]
- 12 Pastorales for piano, Op. 77 (1916–20)
- 4 Nouvelles Sonatines françaises for piano, Op. 87 (1923–24)
- L’Ancienne Maison de campagne for piano, Op. 124 (1923–33)
- Danses pour Ginger Rogers for piano, Op. 163 (1937)
- Vers le soleil – 7 monodies for Ondes Martenot, Op. 174 (1939)
- Suite for cor anglais, Op. 185 (1942)
- Les Chants de Nectaire, 96 pieces for flute solo in 3 series, Opp. 198, 199 & 200 (1944)
- 15 Préludes for piano, Op. 209 (1946)
- Le Repos de Tityre for oboe d’amore solo, Op. 216

=== Choral works ===
- L’Abbaye, Suite religieuse for soli, chorus and orchestra, Opp. 16 & 42 (1908)
- 3 Poèmes for soli, chorus and orchestra, Op. 18 (Jungle Book Cycle)
- Chant funèbre à la mémoire des jeunes femmes défuntes for chorus and orchestra, Op. 37 (1902–08)
- Chant pour Thaelmann for choir and piano or wind band, Op. 138 (1934)
- Requiem des pauvres bougres for chorus, orchestra, piano, organ and Ondes Martenot, Op. 161 (1936–37)

=== Songs ===
- Rondels, Set I, Op. 1 (1890–95)
- 4 Poèmes d’Edmond Haraucourt, Op. 7 (1890–97)
- Rondels, Set II, Op. 8 (1891–96)
- Poèmes d’automne, Op. 13 (1894–99)
- Rondels, Set III, Op. 14 (1896–1901)
- 3 Mélodies, Op. 17 (1895–1900)
- 2 Poèmes d’André Chénier, Op. 23 (1900–02)
- 6 Mélodies sur des poésies d’Albert Samain, Op. 31 (1902–06)
- 5 Chansons de Bilitis, Op. 39 (1898–1908)
- 5 Mélodies sur des poèmes de ‘Shéhérazade’ de Tristan Klingsor Series I, Op. 56 (1914–16)
- 8 Mélodies sur des poèmes de ‘Shéhérazade’ de Tristan Klingsor Series II, Op. 84 (1922–23)
- 7 Chansons pour Gladys, Op. 151 (1935)

== See also ==
- Koechlin family
