= Sébastien Hurtaud =

French classical cellist

- Origin: France
- Occupation: Classical cellist

Sébastien Hurtaud is a French classical cellist.

== Life ==
=== Youth ===
Hurtaud was born in La Rochelle in a family of artists: an older brother tenor and recorder player, Jean-Christophe Hurtaud and a sister pianist and art historian, Marie-Caroline Hurtaud. His older brother took him very young to listen to Bach's St Matthew Passion conducted by Philippe Herreweghe at the Festival de Saintes. He describes this concert as a very memorable experience. He quickly decided to make the cello his vocation.

=== Training ===
Hurtaud began his studies at the Conservatoire de La Rochelle in Jacques Froger's class, followed by the cellist Erwan Fauré in the master classes of Flaine and then joined the Schola Cantorum de Paris in 1996 where he obtained the diploma with the congratulations of the jury in 1997. During this period, he met the conductor Sergiu Celibidache during the latter's last master classes. He then entered the Conservatoire de Paris in 1999 in Jean-Marie Gamard's class (a member of the Via Nova Quartet). Hurtaud obtained his prize with distinction, his master's degree in cello and chamber music.

Between 2004 and 2007, he then studied at the Hochschule für Musik Detmold, the Royal Northern College of Music with the Russian cellist Karine Georgian and the music educator Michel Strauss of the Conservatoire de Boulogne Billancourt. Hurtaud also obtained an Artist Certificate in Andrés Díaz's class and that of Christopher Adkins (soloist of the Dallas Symphony Orchestra) at the Southern Methodist University of Dallas.

During his years of study, he followed different master classes, including one of the latest given by Mstislav Rostropovitch, which was important for the young artist's early career.

=== Career ===
Between 2009 and 2011, he moved to Dallas and played with the artistic director and pianist Charles Wadsworth, as well as with Kim Chee-yun, Stephen Prutsman and Courtnay Budd.

Winner of several international cello competitions (see awards), he met, thanks to the Adam Prize, the German conductor Werner Andreas Albert who became his mentor in his solo career. They played together with the Christchurch Symphony Orchestra Shostakovich's Cello Concerto No.1. Hurtaud was invited by the New Zealand National Orchestra (NZSO) for a national tour under the direction of the Polish conductor Antoni Wit to play Haydn's Cello Concerto No. 2.

Hurtaud has been invited to various festivals in France and abroad: United Kingdom, Slovenia, Slovakia, United States, Panama, Greece, Malta, Russia, Japan, New Zealand. Among the works performed were Saint-Saëns's concertos with Edmon Colomer conducting at the Festival de violoncelle de Beauvais, Friedrich Gulda with Arie van Beek conducting at the festival Classique au Vert and Leoš Svárovský conducting with the Philarmonie Slovaque, Shostakovich at the Festival du Vexin conducted by Dimitris Saroglou with the Orchestre de Picardie. He was invited back to New Zealand by the NZSO in 2017 to perform the premiere of the "Chemin des Dames" concerto dedicated to World War I veterans in Wellington and Auckland.

In chamber music, the cellist maintains a privileged relationship with pianists Pieter-Jelle Deboer, Bruno Canino and Jérémie Honnoré, as well as with pianist Pamela Hurtado, his wife. The collaboration with the latter also led to a disc dedicated to Hindemith's music at Naxos "Hindemith Music for Cello".

Hurtaud is also called to give master classes. In particular, he was able to give advanced courses to students at the University of Waikato, the Conservatoire de Laon, the Conservatoire de La Rochelle, the summer academies of Musicalta, at the Nancyphonies, in Flaine and the Conservatoire de Paris.

== Awards ==
- Gold medal from the Conservatoire de La Rochelle (1994)
- First Prize of the Léopold Bellan International Cello Competition under the presidency of Christian Manen, in Paris (1997)
- Finalist of the Aldo Parisot International Competition, under the presidency of Aldo Parisot himself, in Yongpyong, (South-Korea) (2007)
- Third prize in the International Cello Competition "Naumburg Foundation" under the chairmanship of Robert Mann, in New-York (2008)
- First prize and best Bach performance of the Adam International Cello Festival and Competition under the presidency of Alexander Ivashkin, in Christchurch (New-Zealand) (2009)
- Prize of the "Creative New Zealand" Foundation, in conjunction with Gareth Farr (2015)
- Prize of the Label of the centenary of the First World War (2017).

== Premieres ==
Hurtaud is the dedicatee of several solo pieces, chamber music and concerto:

- Jonathan Grimbert-Barré: Sonate "Caractères". With Paméla Hurtado (piano), premiere at the Salon de Musique in Franche-Comté (2007).
- Jonathan Grimbert-Barré : Trio avec piano. With Ryoko Yano (violin) and Paméla Hurtado (piano), premiered at the Salon de Musique en Franche-Comté (2008).
- Thomas Schwan: Trio & Sonate. Premiere at the Meadows Museum (2009).
- Simon Sargon: Three Tangos. Premiere at the Caruth Auditorium, Dallas (2010).
- Youli Galperine: Duo Violon Violoncelle. Parisian premiere with violinist Alexis Galpérine (2014).
- Youli Galperine: Pas de Deux dedicated to Sébastien and Paméla Hurtaud. Premiere at the Centre de Russie pour la Science et la Culture, Paris (2015)
- Lucas Debargue: Sonate pour violoncelle et piano, premiere at Dom-Musiki, Moscow (2015).
- Gareth Farr : Concerto Chemin des Dames, premiere at Wellington and Auckland with the NZSO then with the Orchestre de Lorraine in Laon. (2017)
