= Khamma (ballet) =

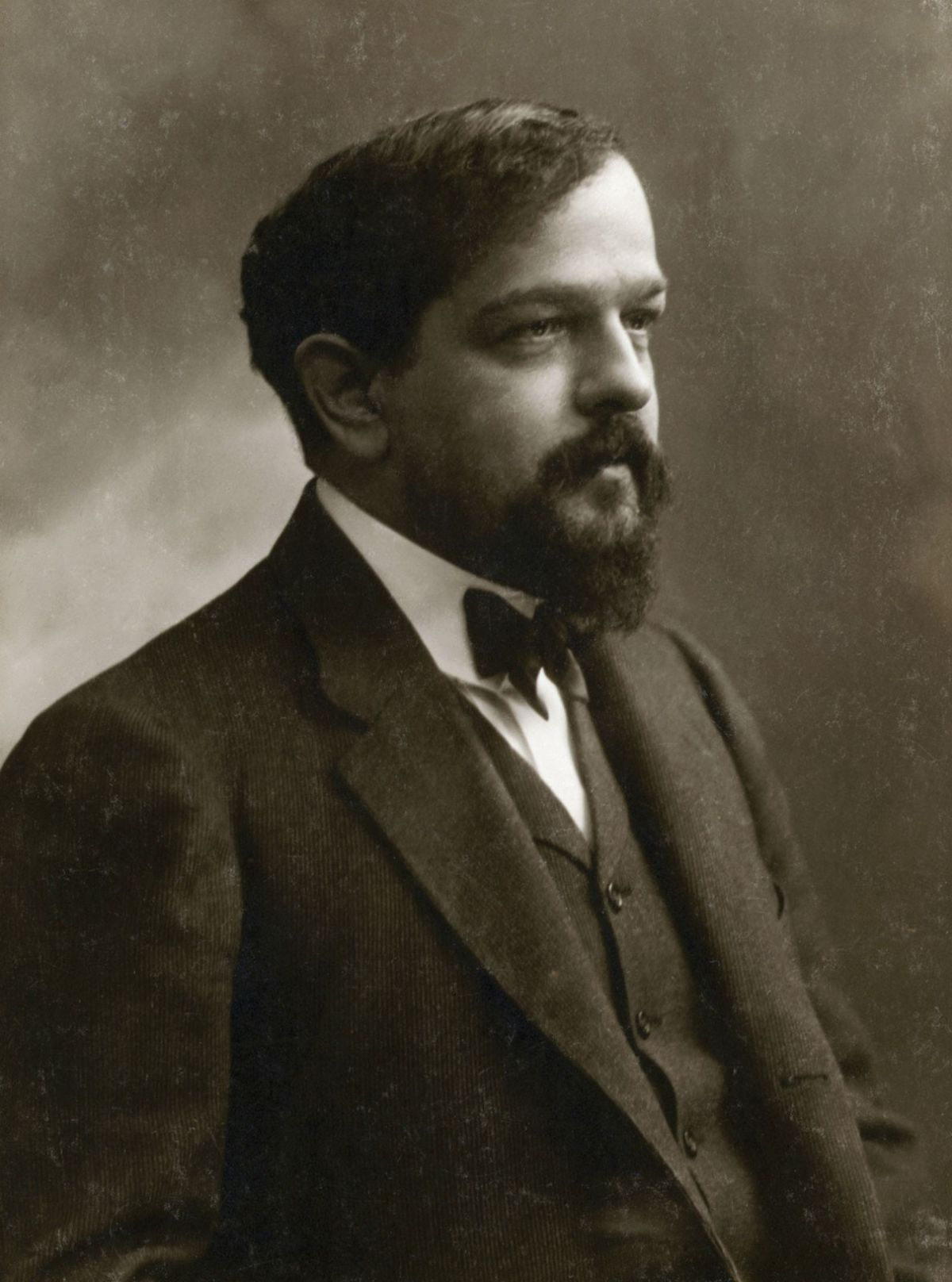
Claude Debussy ca. 1908

Khamma ("légende dansée") is music by Claude Debussy originally intended for a ballet. It was composed in 1911–13, commissioned for the Canadian dancer Maud Allan, who was co-author of a scenario set in ancient Egypt. Debussy came to regret accepting the commission – he found Allan "a detestable woman" – and failed to complete the composition. The score was orchestrated and completed by Charles Koechlin in January 1913.

The work was not performed in Debussy's lifetime. It was first heard in a concert performance in 1924 at the Concerts Colonne in Paris, under the direction of Gabriel Pierné. The staged ballet, which was originally to be called Isis, was first seen in 1947 at the Opéra-Comique.

Khamma is set in Egypt, in the Temple of the Great God Amun-Ra in a town under siege. A young woman, Khamma, dances in front of the statue of the god to implore his aid for the town. After three dances she sees the statue move its head and arms, and ecstatically she dances wildly until a terrific flash of lightning and thunder at which Khamma dies. In the final scene the victorious defenders of the town find her body and lament.

A concert suite follows the three dances of the second stage of the ballet. All the music is by Debussy, orchestrated by Koechlin.

- First dance: Sarabande
- Second dance
- Third dance

The writer Jean-Pascal Vachon writes that the work is uneven and austere, with muted orchestral colours and the dominance of the lower register, but is typical of late Debussy, with possible echoes of Stravinsky’s Petrushka (1911) and pre-echoes of his own Jeux (1913) in its textures and rhythmic organisation.
