= Daniel Austrich =

Russian classical violinist (born 1984)

- Born: 1984 (age 41–42); St. Petersburg
- Education: Oberlin Conservatory of Music; Hochschule für Musik Cologne
- Occupations: Classical musician, violinist, violist, pedagogue, conductor

Daniel Austrich (born 1984) is a Russian classical musician, who is active as a conductor, violinist, violist, and a music coach.

== Early life and education ==
Austrich was born in St. Petersburg, Russia. He studied with Alla Aranovskaya in St.Petersburg and at the Oberlin Conservatory of Music in Ohio; also with Viktor Tretyakov at the Hochschule für Musik in Cologne.

== Career ==
Austrich has won many international competitions, including the 1999 Hamburg Instrumental Competition. He has soloed with the Moscow State Symphony Orchestra, Moscow Philharmonic, St. Petersburg Camerata, Zurich Chamber Orchestra, Tokyo Metropolitan Symphony Orchestra, Sapporo Symphony, and Jerusalem Symphony among others.

In 2009 Austrich gave the Russian premiere of "Fantasy for Violin and Orchestra on Porgy and Bess" by Alexander Courage, in Moscow. His chamber music partners include David Geringas, Itzhak Perlman, Donald Weilerstein, Renaud Capucon, Lahav Shani, Kirill Gerstein, Pamela Frank, Olga Scheps, Gerard Causse and others. Austrich also recorded a duet with Jose Carreras for the album Energia.

In 2012, Austrich joined Michelangelo String Quartet, where he performs together with Mihaela Martin, Nobuko Imai, and Frans Helmerson. In 2012, the quartet performed in Scotland. In 2015 they performed at the Library of Congress, receiving a mixed review from the Washington Post. In 2015 he performed with this group at the George Enescu International Festival and the Edinburgh Festival; that same year the quartet traveled to Tokyo to perform music by Beethoven, and Austrich also performed with the Macombo Chamber Players.

In 2016, he performed at the International Chamber Music Festival in Jerusalem and as part of the Classical extravaganza concerts in Russia.
