= Cherubini Quartet =

German string quartet

The Cherubini Quartet (German: Cherubini-Quartett) was a German string quartet from Düsseldorf, founded in 1978.

It is named after the Italian composer Luigi Cherubini, who wrote six string quartets. The Cherubini Quartet has won international acclaim with its interpretations of nineteenth-century string quartets, winning prizes such as the Grand Prix in Evian/France.

== Members ==
- Violin: Christoph Poppen
- Violin: Harald Schoneweg (1978–1994), Ulf Gunnar Wallin (1995–1997)
- Viola: Hariolf Schlichtig
- Violoncello: Klaus Kämper (1978–1989), Manuel Fischer-Dieskau (1989–1995), Christoph Richter (1995–1997)

== Repertoire ==
The Cherubini Quartet has performed string quartets by Wolfgang Amadeus Mozart, Franz Schubert, Felix Mendelssohn, and Robert Schumann.

== Awards ==
- Märkisches Stipendium für Musik for the years 1980/81 and 1981/82
- Grand Prix at the International String Quartet Competition in Evian/France in 1981
