= The Cellist (painting) =

1894 painting by Paul Gauguin

- Le violoncelliste Upaupa Schneklud (French), Portrait of Upaupa Schneklud (English)
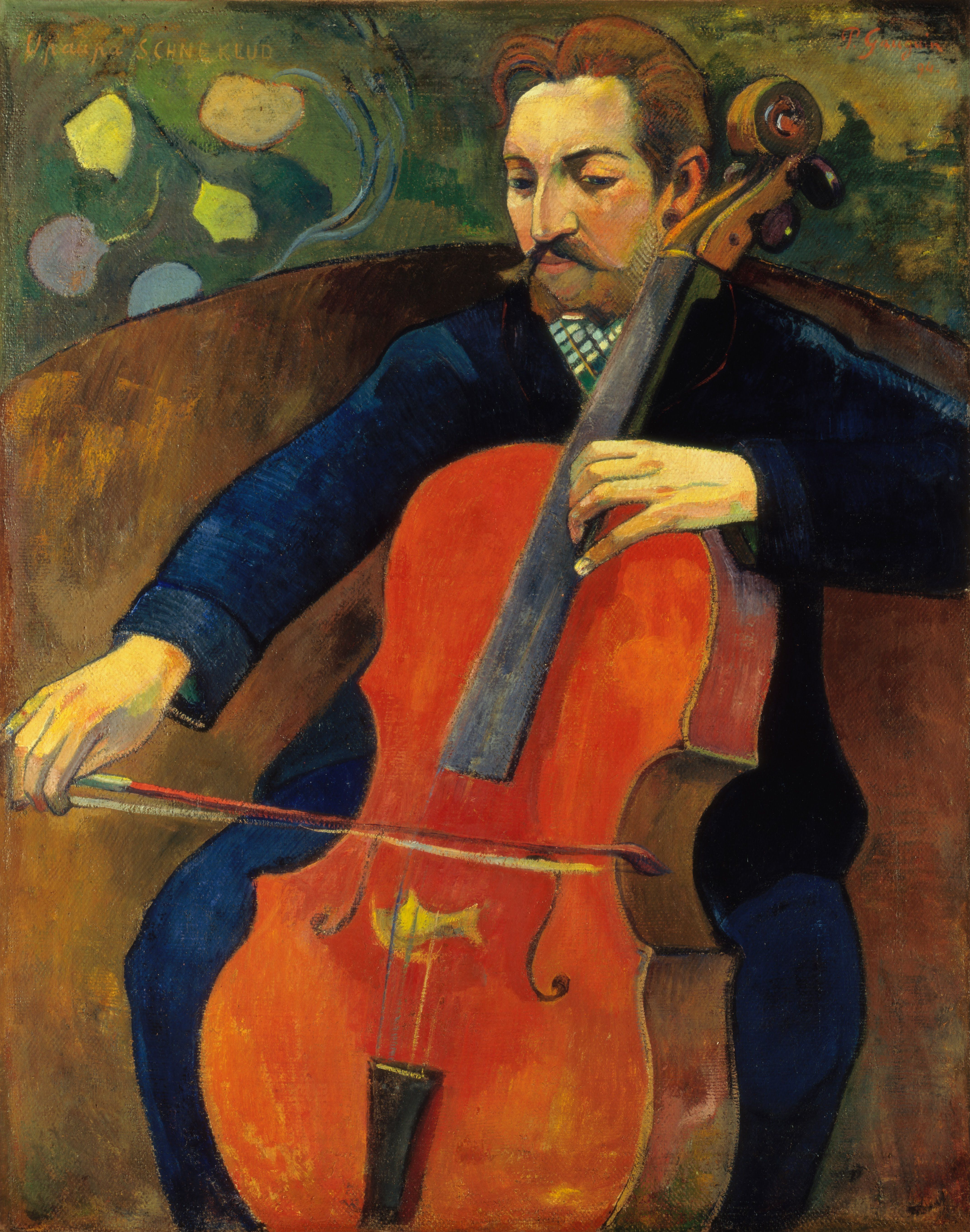
- Artist: Paul Gauguin
- Year: 1894
- Medium: Oil painting
- Dimensions: 92·73
- Location: Baltimore Museum of Art, Baltimore

The Cellist (Le violoncelliste) is an oil painting by Paul Gauguin which is kept in the Baltimore Museum of Art.

Paul Gauguin painted Fritz Schneklud, a friend and professional musician, in 1894.

== See also ==
- List of paintings by Paul Gauguin
