= Li-Wei Qin =

Chinese-Australian cellist (born 1976)

Li-Wei Qin 秦立巍
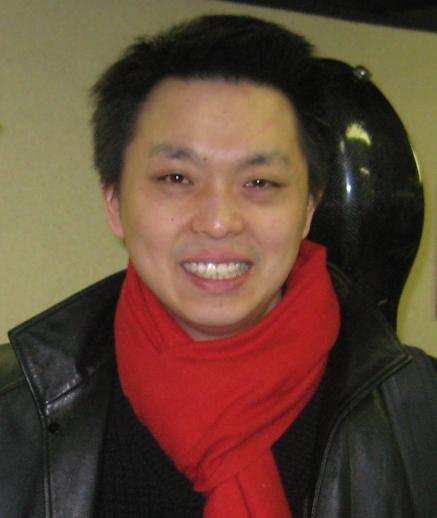
- Qin in 2008

Background information
- Born: 16 February 1976 (age 50); Shanghai, China
- Genres: Classical
- Occupations: Musician; teacher
- Instrument: Cello
- Years active: 1993–present
- Labels: Decca Classics; Naxos; Channel Classics; ABC Classics
- Website: liweiqin.com

Chinese name
- Traditional Chinese: 秦立巍
Transcriptions
Standard Mandarin
- Hanyu Pinyin: Qín Lìwēi

Li-Wei Qin (Chinese: 秦立巍; pinyin: Qín Lìwēi; born 16 February 1976) is a Chinese-Australian cellist. He won the Silver Medal at the 11th International Tchaikovsky Competition in 1998, and First Prize at the 2001 International Naumburg Competition in New York.

== Early life and education ==
Born in Shanghai, Qin and his family moved to Melbourne when he was thirteen years of age. He began learning the cello with his father, Qin Qing, a former principal cellist of the Shanghai Symphony Orchestra, and later studied with Nelson Cooke. Following a year of commerce studies at the University of Melbourne, he accepted scholarships to study with Ralph Kirshbaum at the Royal Northern College of Music in Manchester and with David Takeno at the Guildhall School of Music and Drama in London.

== Career ==
In 1993, Qin was named the ABC Young Performer of the Year. In 1997, he won both the Adam International Cello Competition in New Zealand and the Royal Over-Seas League Music Competition. He then came to international attention as the Silver Medalist of the 1998 International Tchaikovsky Competition, and the winner of the 2001 International Naumburg Competition. He joined the BBC Radio 3 New Generation Artists scheme in 2001.

Qin has collaborated with many of the world’s top orchestras including the London Symphony Orchestra, Los Angeles Philharmonic, BBC Symphony Orchestra, London Philharmonic Orchestra, Rundfunk-Sinfonieorchester Berlin, NDR-Sinfonieorchester Hamburg, Konzerthausorchester Berlin, Vienna Radio Symphony Orchestra, Finnish Radio Symphony Orchestra, Prague Symphony Orchestra, Osaka Philharmonic, Hong Kong Philharmonic, China Philharmonic, Sydney Symphony Orchestra and the Melbourne Symphony Orchestra among many others. He has also appeared with ensembles such as Kremerata Baltica, Sinfonia Varsovia, the Munich Chamber Orchestra, Zürich Chamber Orchestra, and the Australian Chamber Orchestra.

As a recitalist and chamber musician, Qin has regularly performed at Wigmore Hall and for Chamber Music Society of Lincoln Center in New York. He has also appeared at the BBC Proms, Rheingau Musik Festival, Schleswig-Holstein Musik Festival and the City of London Festival. Musicians with whom he has collaborated with include Daniel Hope, Nobuko Imai, Mischa Maisky, David Finckel, Wu Han, Lü Siqing and Peter Frankl.

Qin is currently a professor at the National University of Singapore’s Yong Siew Toh Conservatory of Music, and a guest professor at both the Central Conservatory of Music in Beijing and the Shanghai Conservatory of Music. He was previously on the faculty at the Royal Northern College of Music.

== Discography ==
- Elgar: Cello Concerto; Sea Pictures with the Adelaide Symphony Orchestra and Nicholas Braithwaite (ABC Classics, 2005)
- Alone – Works for Solo Cello (Cello Classics, 2009)
- Beethoven: The Cello Sonatas with Albert Tiu (Decca Classics, 2010)
- Dvořák: Cello Concerto; Silent Woods with the Singapore Symphony Orchestra and Lan Shui (Decca Classics, 2012)
- Rachmaninov – Works for Cello and Piano with Albert Tiu (Decca Classics, 2012)
- Ross Harris: Symphony No. 4 & Cello Concerto with the Auckland Philharmonia and Garry Walker (Naxos, 2014)
- DUO with Ning Feng (Decca Classics, 2014)
- Elgar & Walton: Cello Concertos with the London Philharmonic Orchestra and Zhang Yi (Decca Classics/ABC Classics, 2014)
- Wenchen Qin: Violin & Cello Concertos with the Vienna Radio Symphony Orchestra and Gottfried Rabl (Naxos, 2017)
- Russian Cello Concertos with the Czech Chamber Philharmonic Orchestra and Michael Halász (Naxos, 2019)

== Awards and nominations ==
=== ARIA Music Awards ===
The ARIA Music Awards are presented annually from 1987 by the Australian Recording Industry Association (ARIA).

Year	Nominee / work	Award	Result	Ref.
2010	Beethoven Cello Sonatas	Best Classical Album	Nominated	
