= Alain Meunier =

French cellist (born 1942)

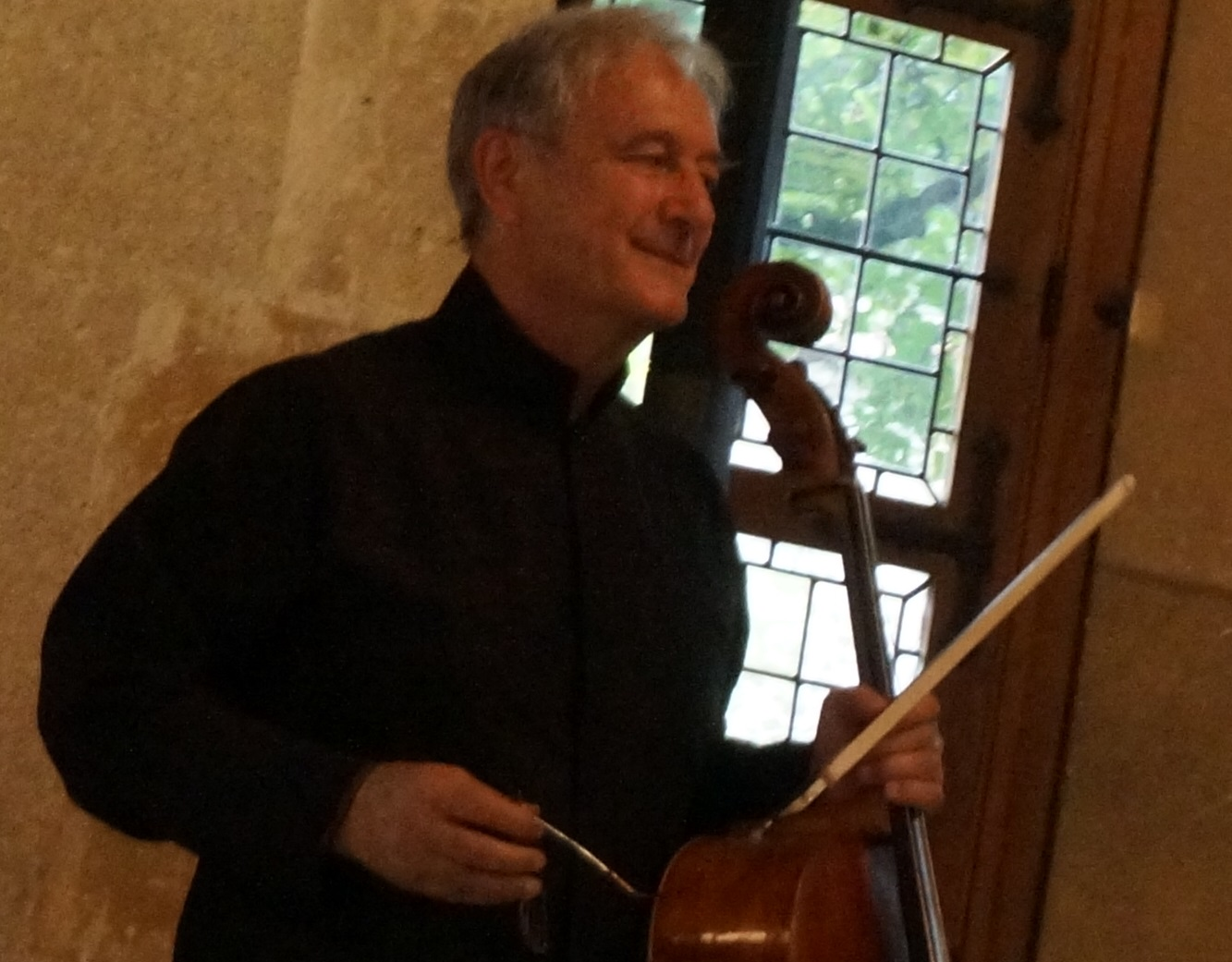
2014

Alain Meunier (born 22 June 1942 in Paris) is a French cellist.

Meunier was born in Paris, the third child among four siblings. Starting the cello at the age of 13 and received premier prix in chamber music at 15 and in cello at 16. He suddenly quit musical activities at the age of 18 and studied musical aesthetics and musicology.

However, he began cello again as 22 and played in front of Pablo Casals aiming at Prades Festival. He entered Accademia Musicale Chigiana in Siena in Italy, and was a member of an ensemble "Piano Quintetto Chigiana" after graduation. He also studied cello with Maurice Maréchal.

He taught at Accademia Musicale Chigiana from 22 years old, and served on the faculty at the Lyon Conservatory in France.

He has been a professor of the Conservatoire de Lyon since 1989, and he is now director of "Bordeaux International String Quartet Competition".

He has served on the Rostropovich Cello Competition jury in 1986, and most recently on the "1st Gaspar Cassadó International Violoncello Competition in Hachiōji" in 2006.
