= Christchurch Symphony Orchestra =

Orchestra in New Zealand

- Orchestra
- Short name: CSO
- Former name: John Ritchie String Orchestra (1958–1962), Christchurch Civic Orchestra (1962–1974)
- Founded: 1958
- Location: Christchurch, New Zealand
- Concert hall: Christchurch Town Hall
- Principal conductor: Benjamin Northey
- Website: www.cso.co.nz

The Christchurch Symphony Orchestra (CSO) is the largest professional orchestra in the South Island of New Zealand, based in the city of Christchurch. It was established in 1958 as the John Ritchie String Orchestra, due to the vision and encouragement of Christchurch composer John Ritchie. It was renamed the Christchurch Civic Orchestra four years later in 1962, and has used its current name since 1974.

Currently, the CSO has an established core of principal and tenured players with additional contracted casual players. The orchestra performs in over fifty concerts a year including performances for the Royal New Zealand Ballet, Southern Opera, Christchurch City Council events, the National Concerto Competition and the Adam International Cello Festival and Competition. The CSO repertoire presents a wide range of classical, pops and contemporary musical styles. The orchestra also works with primary and secondary schools throughout the South Island with its Community Engagement Programme. The Chief Conductor since 2015 is the Australian conductor Benjamin Northey.

== History ==
=== Early history ===
Christchurch radio station 3YA supported a broadcast orchestra between 1934 and 1959, and other orchestras were formed at various times for special events, but by the late 1950s there was enough talent and interest in Christchurch to form a more permanent orchestra group. University lecturer John Ritchie formed the John Ritchie String Orchestra in 1959, modelled after the Alex Lindsay String Orchestra of Wellington, which was itself modelled after the Boyd Neel String Orchestra from the United Kingdom. When the 3YA orchestra closed down later that year a number of local choral groups needed a replacement orchestra to accompany them in practice and performance. The JRSO — augmented with wind instruments — was suggested as the basis for forming a permanent civic orchestra by the Civic Music Council and the Musician's Union. By February 1961 local councils had agreed to help fund the group and the Christchurch Civic Orchestra Foundation was formed. The first full performance of the CCO was at the Civic Theatre on 19 November 1962.

=== Controversy in the mid-1970s ===
By the mid-1970s the orchestra was led by Yugoslavian composer and conductor Vančo Čavdarski. Incumbent mayor of Christchurch, Neville Pickering, had been given the position of Patron and president in 1972. In 1974 the orchestra adopted the name Christchurch Symphony Orchestra to reflect the quality of performances the group had achieved since their formation.

During 1974 a rift began to form between Pickering and the musician representatives of the board. Disagreements about the reappointment of Čavdarski (specifically, how much he should be paid and whether he should continue to split his time between Christchurch and the Tasmanian Symphony Orchestra) rapidly snowballed into a major conflict. After realising he had fallen out with Pickering, Čavdarski offered to resign to placate the board, despite still being very popular with the musicians and the people of Christchurch in general. Controversially the board voted to accept this resignation without all members being present, resulting in the perception that Čavdarski had been sacked by Pickering. Pickering nominated William Southgate as a replacement conductor, and he was soon confirmed in the position, though members of the orchestra objected to the process. When faced with public criticism, Pickering doubled-down, saying there was a "clique in the orchestra which had caused problems in the orchestra board". The result was a constitutional crisis in the foundation, with some members trying to have Pickering removed, and Pickering ignoring constitutional protocols to hold onto his position. Pickering enlisted support from the Arts Council (now Creative New Zealand), who eventually refused to continue funding the group unless their structure was changed to appoint an administrator with total power to run the orchestra.

Pickering lost the 1974 Christchurch mayoral election — in some part due to the public drama in the orchestra — and as a result also lost his position on the board. However, his final act was to install a set of three administrators tasked with restructuring the organisation. This arrangement did not last long, and was itself replaced within months by an interim management committee led by new Christchurch mayor Hamish Hay. They proposed the foundation be replaced with a trust, with seven elected members of the public as trustees. With the remaining foundation board refusing to co-operate with the proposed changes, a completely new and independent organisation — the Canterbury Orchestra Trust — was formed instead. While the CSO no longer had grants from the various councils that had been pressuring it to change, it did still have the goodwill of a lot of public supporters who kept the orchestra alive through donations. This resulted in two orchestras existing in 1975; the original CSO foundation (now with no funding from either local councils or the Arts Council), and the new trust, which had the financial backing that the CSO had previously enjoyed.

Over the next three years there were multiple attempts to reconcile and combine the orchestras with no success. The relationship between them remained frosty, with some musicians performing alternately for both orchestras, but others choosing a side and refusing to perform for the other on principle. Despite a more secure line of funding, in 1979 the Canterbury Orchestra Trust abruptly announced they were winding up. The Arts Council were not prepared to increase their grant and local councils were considering cancelling their grants, so the trust decided the Canterbury Orchestra was a "dying cause". Christchurch returned to having just one Christchurch Symphony Orchestra.

=== Later years ===
During the 1980s the orchestra began rebuilding their base of support. In 1985 they performed the first of the annual Classical Sparks concerts, part of the Summertimes festival supported by the Christchurch City Council. This is a public concert in Hagley Park that ends with a fireworks display, and is still running today (under the name Sparks!).

By 1989 the orchestra was once again close to collapse, but this time due to a lack of funding. At the same time, the 1989 New Zealand local government reforms were underway. The newly expanded Christchurch City Council agreed to increase their grant, but only if performances were made at a reduced ticket price for ratepayers. In 1990 new manager Tony Kunowski pushed the orchestra towards being more profitable by better marketing of performances to larger audiences. The effort was successful, with ticket sales increasing from NZ$67,000 in 1990 to NZ$207,000 in 1991. Throughout the nineties the orchestra continued to attract corporate sponsors that further secured their future, though funding would continue to be an issue into the 2000s.

During the late 1990s the orchestra began recruiting musicians from overseas, particularly Ukraine, in an attempt to improve the standard of performance. This caused some complaints from local musicians, who enlisted the Service Workers Union to represent their concerns that local talent was being overlooked to the Minister of Immigration. Partly in response to this controversy, the governance of the orchestra was restructured to be made up of three entities; CSO Ltd. to handle the day-to-day operations, with the existing CSO Inc. and CSO Foundation Trust controlling it at arm's length. This had the effect of minimising the role of members of CSO Inc. This complex structure remained until 2002, when both CSO Inc. and CSO Ltd. were wound up and replaced by a single charitable trust. In 2004 Creative New Zealand and the Christchurch City Council insisted on further restructuring to remove conflicts of interest between the management of the orchestra and supporting groups, including musicians.

In 2003 the orchestra performed a concert with Bic Runga, which was recorded and released as the album Live in Concert with the Christchurch Symphony. Brooke Fraser performed with the Tom Rainey string quartet as the opening act. The quartet returned for a joint performance with Anika Moa later in the year.

The 2011 Christchurch earthquake rendered the Christchurch Town Hall unsafe for use, leaving the orchestra without a major venue. They continued to perform, but on a more ad-hoc basis at smaller venues, including Ballantynes department store and an aircraft hangar at the Air Force Museum of New Zealand. Local MP and Earthquake Recovery Minister Gerry Brownlee wanted the Town Hall demolished and replaced with a new performing-arts precinct, but in 2013 the Christchurch City Council instead voted to repair and upgrade the damaged building. The CSO had been considering building an alternative venue in a hanger at the former Wigram Aerodrome, built in partnership with Ngāi Tahu, but this plan was shelved when the decision to retain the Town Hall was made. The refurbished Town Hall reopened in 2019, with a joint concert between the CSO and Christchurch drum and bass band Shapeshifter.

Between 2004 and 2009 the chief-executive of the orchestra was Murray Shaw, chair of the Creative New Zealand Arts board. In 2012 his replacement, James Caygill, was made redundant when the position of chief-executive was disestablished by the board. The position was soon re-established and filled by Richard Ballantyne on an interim basis. Gretchen La Roche was appointed as Chief Executive in 2013 and remained in the role until 2021. Dr. Graham Sattler is the current Chief Executive.

In 2013 the orchestra performed with Dave Dobbyn and Anika Moa. In 2015 the orchestra reunited with Moa for a performance with Julia Deans. In 2021 they collaborated with Tiki Taane, Big Sima and MC Tali for a performance titled Ōtautahi Proud. In February 2023 they performed with Stan Walker in Nelson.

== Notable people ==
Dates refer to the years the individual was involved with the orchestra.

=== Conductors ===
- John Ritchie (1962-1973)
- Peter Godfrey (1967; 1985)
- Alex Lindsay (1969)
- Vančo Čavdarski (1972-1976; 1980-1982; 1985-1995)
- William Southgate (1975; 1985-2007)
- Georg Tintner (1980-1988)
- John Curro (1982-1988)
- Lionel Newman (1985)
- John Hopkins (1985; 1991; 1994)
- Erich Bergel (1986; 1988)
- Michael Houstoun (1986-1990; 1997; 1999)
- Martin Turnovský (1987)
- Donald Johanos (1987-1988)
- Russell Garcia (1988; 1993)
- Ari Angervo (1989)
- Theodore Kuchar (1989-1992)
- Doug Caldwell (1991)
- Carl St.Clair (1992)
- Vladimir Verbitsky (1993-2001)
- Vladimir Kamirski (1994-2000)
- Douglas Gamley (1995)
- Edvard Tchivzhel (1995)
- Uwe Grodd (1996-1997)
- Gordon Hunt (1997)
- Tommy Tycho (1997)
- Jeffrey Crellin (1998)
- Richard Divall (1998-1999)
- John Georgiadis (1998-1999)
- Ken Young (1998-2000)
- Marc Taddei (1998-2006)
- Alan Broadbent (2002)
- Shlomo Mintz (2004)
- Luke Dollman (2006)
- Ross Pople (2007)
- Werner Andreas Albert (2007)
- Tecwyn Evans (2007)
- Benjamin Northey (2015-present)

== See also ==
- New Zealand Symphony Orchestra
- Orchestra Wellington
- Auckland Philharmonia
- Royal New Zealand Ballet
- New Zealand Opera
