= Frans Helmerson =

Swedish cellist, pedagogue and conductor

Frans Helmerson (born 1945) is a Swedish cellist, pedagogue, and conductor.

== Biography ==
Helmerson was born in 1945 and by the age of 8 began playing cello. Later on, he studied with Guido Vecchi in Götheborg, Giuseppe Selmi in Rome, and with William Pleeth in London. His first concert was in Stockholm, Sweden after which he went on to travel throughout Europe, Asia, United States, and Russia. He has performed under many conductors, including Sir Colin Davis, Maxim Shostakovich, Neemi Järvi, Evgeny Svetlanov, Gennadi Roshdestvensky, Kurt Sanderling, Rafael Frühbeck de Burgos, Rostropovich, Herbert Blomstedt, Seiji Ozawa, Yuri Temirkanov und Esa-Pekka Salonen and many others. In 2002 he founded the Michelangelo String Quartet in which he regularly performs worldwide, together with Mihaela Martin, Daniel Austrich and Nobuko Imai.

Helmerson for many years has taught at the Hochschule für Musik und Tanz Köln, as well as at Escuela Superior Musica Reina Sofia in Madrid. He was also guest professor at the Hochschule für Musik Hanns Eisler Berlin, and currently teaches at the Barenboim–Said Akademie in Berlin and the Kronberg Academy in Frankfurt. His recording of the Dvorak Concerto at the BIS Records label was praised by critics as the best classical recording available on the market. Also to a great critical acclaim, he released two cello concertos by Shostakovich, along with conductor Valery Polyansky and the Russian State Symphony Capella.
