= Colonne Orchestra =

French symphony orchestra

The Colonne Orchestra is a French symphony orchestra, founded in 1873 by the violinist and conductor Édouard Colonne.

== History ==
While leader of the Opéra de Paris orchestra, Édouard Colonne was engaged by the publisher Georges Hartmann to lead a series of popular concerts which he founded under the title of ‘Concert National’ in March 1873. While at first a great success, the financial burden forced Hartmann to withdraw from the enterprise.

However, Colonne then decided to form his own orchestra, ‘l’Association artistique des Concerts Colonne’ based at the Théâtre du Châtelet in November 1873. The Concerts Colonne placed particular emphasis on contemporary music of the time such as (Saint-Saëns, Massenet, Charpentier, Fauré, d'Indy, Debussy, Ravel, Widor, Enescu, Dukas and Chabrier), alongside which were programmed Wagner and Richard Strauss. Colonne and his orchestra were central to reviving and sustaining interest in the music of Berlioz after his death; following a 1877 concert performance of La Damnation de Faust at the Chatelet it became a permanent part of the orchestra's repertoire, played 117 times by the time of the composer's centenary in 1903, as well as other works by him. Under Colonne the orchestra mainly played French and German works; Colonne conducted the large majority of concerts with occasional guest conductors such as Felix Mottl, Hans Richter, and Arthur Nikisch. In April 1910 Mahler gave the French premiere of his second symphony at the Théâtre du Châtelet. Among the principals under Colonne was Pierre Monteux, leader of the violas from 1893. As well as Mahler, Peter Tchaikovsky, Claude Debussy, Edvard Grieg, Richard Strauss, Maurice Ravel, Gabriel Pierne, and Prokofiev conducted their music with the orchestra over the years.

For his Ballets Russes, the impresario Diaghilev engaged an orchestra in each city his company was visiting; in Paris it was the Colonne, which thus after the death of its founder played for the premieres of ballets such as L'Oiseau de feu (1910), Petrushka (1911), Afternoon of a Faun (1912), Daphnis et Chloé (1912), Jeux (1913) and Le Sacre du printemps (1913).

Even after the departure of its founder the orchestra championed new music, with 22 premieres in the 1923–24 season. State subsidies for orchestras had begun in France in 1897; by 1929 the Concerts Colonne were receiving 75,000 francs a year, the same as the Lamoureux, with other Parisian formations receiving less.

Notable premieres given by the Colonne include Saint-Saëns Danse macabre 1875, Chausson Soir de Fête 1898, Enesco Poème roumain 1898, and Symphony No.1 1906, d'Indy Jour d'été à la montagne 1906, Ravel Une barque sur l'océan 1907 and Rapsodie espagnole 1908, Ibert La ballade de la geôle de Reading 1922, Debussy Khamma 1924, Mihalovici Capriccio roumain 1937, Bondeville Symphonie chorégraphique 1965.

== Musical directors ==
- Édouard Colonne (1873–1910)
- Gabriel Pierné (1910–1932)
- Paul Paray (1932–1956)
- Charles Münch (1956–1958)
- Pierre Dervaux (1958–1992)
- Antonello Allemandi (1992–1997)
- Laurent Petitgirard (from 2004)
- Marc Korovitch (from 2022)

== Recordings ==
The Colonne orchestra was one of the first orchestras to embark on a series of sound recordings when from 1908-09 Colonne himself went into the studio, leading to 20 discs with the orchestra for Pathé in Paris into the 1920s. A second period of recording for the orchestra occurred from 1928 to 1931 under Pierné amounting to 148 78 sides, encompassing French, Russian and German repertoire. In 1938 Yehudi Menuhin recorded the Mendelssohn violin concerto and Wieniawski Légende with Enescu conducting the Colonne Orchestra, and during the war Roger Désormière set down contemporaray French works by Messaien, Delvincourt, Barraud and Delannoy. After La Péri and the Symphonie fantastique from Paray in 1949 and 1951, the main conductor of the remaining records was Jean Fournet, with 28 discs between 1947 and 1951.
