= Natalia Gutman =

Russian cellist (born 1942)

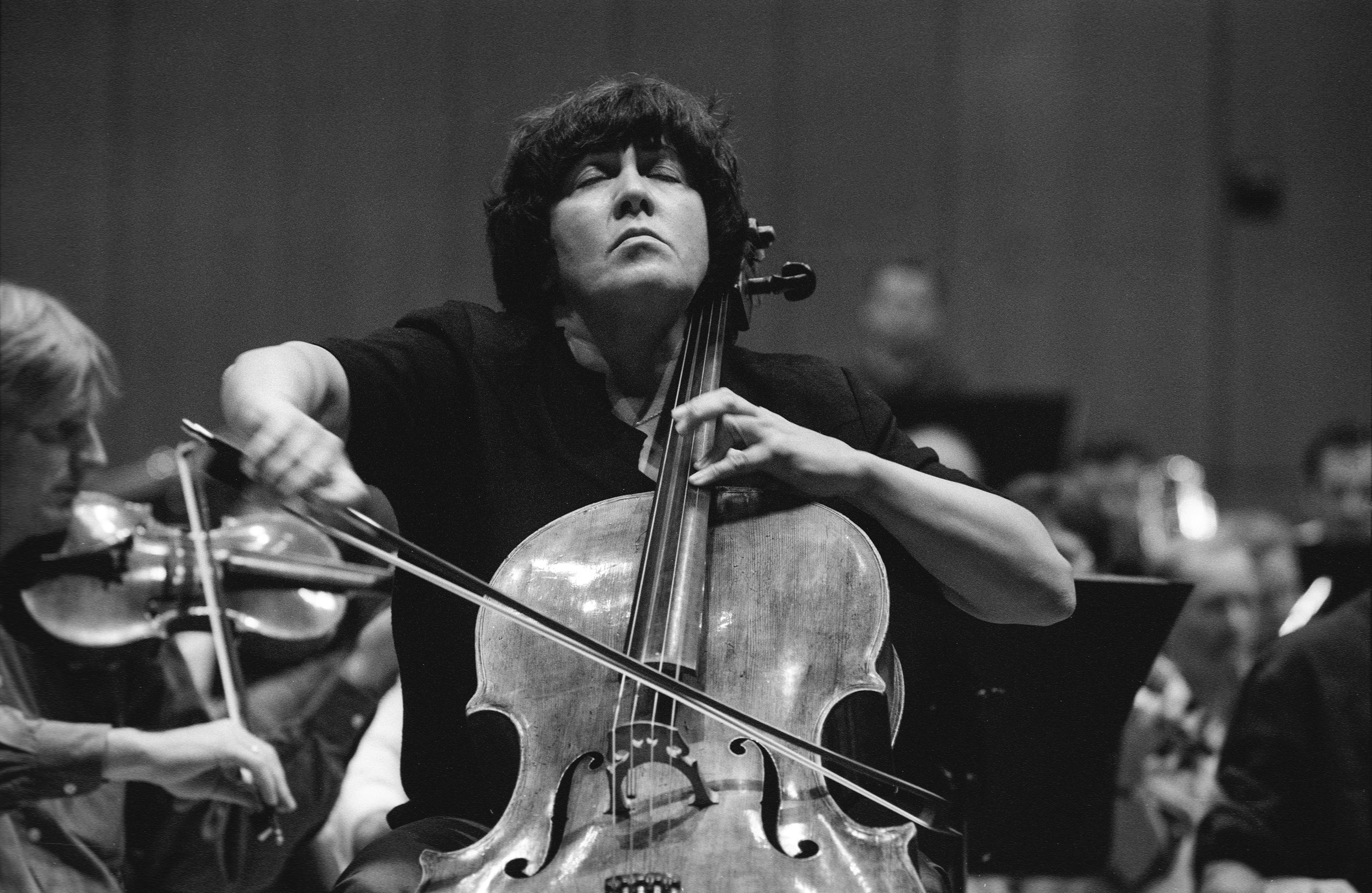
Gutman in 1998

Natalia Grigoryevna Gutman (Russian: Наталья Григорьевна Гутман; born 14 November 1942), PAU, is a Russian cellist. She began to study cello at the Moscow Music School with R. Sapozhnikov. She was later admitted to the Moscow Conservatory. She later studied with Mstislav Rostropovich.

== Biography ==
Natalia Gutman was born on 14 November 1942 in Kazan to a Jewish family.

From the age of 5 she played the cello, studied with her stepfather, the cellist R. E. Sapozhnikov, and from the age of 14 with her grandfather A. A. Berlin. Until the second grade, she studied at the Gnessin Music School, then at the Central Music School at the Moscow Conservatory.

Already at the age of nine she played her first solo concert at a music school. In 1964, she graduated from the Moscow Conservatory and, in 1968, she did postgraduate studies at the Leningrad Conservatory.

== Career ==
Distinguished at important international competitions, she has carried out tours around Europe, America and Japan, being invited as a soloist by great conductors and orchestras. At one notable recital, she was accompanied by Sviatoslav Richter in the Chopin Cello Sonata. Always attentive to music from the 20th century, she regularly performs works by contemporary composers. She has recorded Shostakovich's Cello Concerto for RCA records and Dvořák's Cello Concerto with Wolfgang Sawallisch conducting the Philadelphia Orchestra for EMI records.

She has performed with for example, the Vienna Philharmonic, the Berlin Philharmonic, Munich Philharmonic, Saint Petersburg Philharmonic Orchestra, the London Symphony Orchestra or the Concertgebouw Orchestra.

A great supporter of chamber music and contemporary music, she founded the Musikfest Kreuth with her husband, Oleg Kagan, in 1990. She continued the festival in memory of Kagan, who died in 1990.
