= André Navarra =

French musician

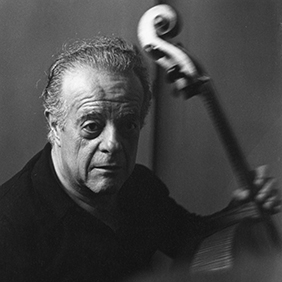
André Navarra

André-Nicolas Navarra (13 October 1911 – 31 July 1988) was a French cellist and cello teacher who was born in Biarritz and died in Siena.

== Early life ==
He was born into a musical family in Biarritz, his father being a bassist of Italian descent. His parents took steps to prepare him for music before setting him up with an instrument, teaching him scales and solfège before he began studying cello at age seven. Two years later, he was accepted as a student at the Toulouse Conservatory, and graduated in 1924 with first prize at age thirteen. He then continued his studies at the Conservatoire de Paris, learning cello from Jules-Leopold Loeb and chamber music from Charles Tournemire. He graduated two years later at age fifteen, again taking first prize.

After the completion of his lessons at the Conservatoire de Paris, Navarra stopped taking lessons entirely—something very unusual for first-rate soloists. Instead, he worked out his own course of study, and practiced at it. This included transcribing many of the violin technical methods to make up for a lack of decent cello études, including those of Carl Flesch and Otakar Ševčík.

Navarra remained in Paris for this period of self-study, and used the opportunity to meet and observe the playing of musicians such as Emanuel Feuermann, the pianist Alfred Cortot, and the violinist Jacques Thibaud. Navarra also developed friendships with composers Jacques Ibert, Florent Schmitt, and Arthur Honegger. Later on, he was mentored by Pablo Casals in regard to artistic matters.

== Professional career ==
In 1929, at the age of eighteen, Navarra joined the Krettly Quartet, and remained with them for the next seven years. He also helped form an ensemble called the B.B.N. Trio with the pianist Joseph Benvenuti and violinist René Benedetti. Two years later, he made his solo debut with Paris's Colonne Orchestra, performing Édouard Lalo's Cello Concerto in D minor. In 1933 he became principal cellist of the Paris Opéra Orchestra, in addition to continuing to appear as a soloist with various European orchestras.

During these years, Navarra was exceptionally athletic. His favourite sport was swimming, but he also enjoyed boxing. This led to Navarra developing an extremely strong and stocky physique which he kept for years afterward. He regarded this as ideal for a cellist, allowing him to dominate the relatively large instrument.

Navarra slowly continued to establish his career throughout the 1930s, receiving a major boost in 1937 when he won first prize at the Vienna International Competition. However, his career was abruptly halted by World War II in 1939. During this time he abandoned his cello and served with the French infantry.

== Navarra after World War II ==
In 1945, after a period of practice to regain his physical skills, André Navarra resumed his career. In 1949, he accepted a professorship at the Conservatoire de Paris as a successor to Pierre Fournier, and meanwhile toured extensively in the United States, Europe, Asia, and the Soviet Union, playing with the era's great conductors. His performances included premieres of cello concertos written for him. Among them was one by André Jolivet, which Navarra recorded for Erato; it received release in the United States on Westminster XWN-19118 (mono) and WST-17118 (stereo). He also recorded a particularly well-received version of Edward Elgar's Cello Concerto with Sir John Barbirolli conducting.

In addition to his position at the Conservatoire de Paris, Navarra taught master classes at the Accademia Musicale Chigiana during summers beginning in 1954, where among his students was a young Saša Večtomov, fall courses in Saint-Jean-de-Luz, and accepted an additional professorship at the Hochschule für Musik Detmold in 1958. He also taught in London and Vienna.

Navarra recorded Dvořák's Cello Concerto in 1954 with the New Symphony Orchestra of London, conducted by Rudolph Schwarz. Capitol Records released it in 1955, catalog number P 8301.

Navarra completed acclaimed tours of Southern Africa in 1965, 1969 and 1973. He died in Siena, Italy.
