= Pierre Fournier =

French cellist

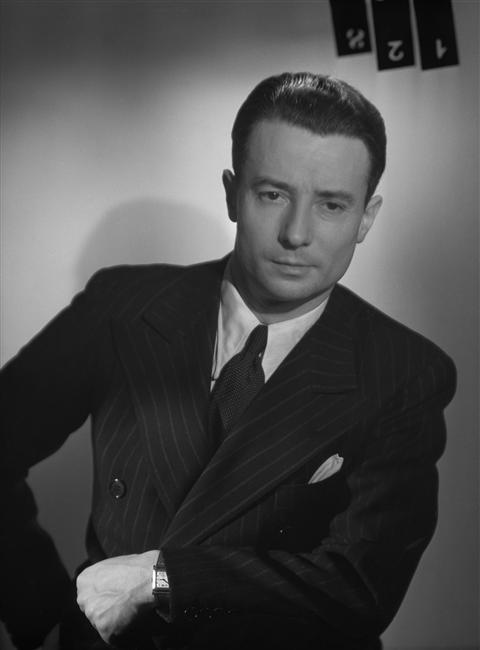
Photograph of Fournier, taken by Studio Harcourt in 1941

Pierre Léon Marie Fournier (24 June 1906 – 8 January 1986) was a French cellist who was called the "aristocrat of cellists" on account of his elegant musicianship and majestic sound.

== Biography ==
External audio
- You may listen to Pierre Fournier performing Antonin Dvorak's Cello Concerto in B minor, Op. 104 with Alfred Wallenstein conducting the Berlin Philharmonic in 1962 here on archive.org

Pierre Fournier was born in Paris, the son of a French Army general. His mother taught him to play the piano, but he had a mild case of polio as a child and lost dexterity in his feet and legs. Having difficulties with the piano pedals, he turned to the cello at the age of nine.

He received early training from Odette Krettly, and from 1918 studied with André Hekking and later with Paul Bazelaire. He graduated from the Paris Conservatory at 17, in 1923. He was hailed as "the cellist of the future" and won praise for his virtuosity and bowing technique. In the period 1925–1929 he was a member of the Krettly Quartet, led by Odette's brother Robert Krettly.

He became well known when he played with the Concerts Colonne Orchestra in 1925. He began touring all over Europe. At various stages he played with many of the most highly acclaimed, prestigious musicians of his time, and recorded the complete chamber music of Brahms and Schubert for the BBC on acetates. However, these deteriorated before the recordings could be transferred to a more durable medium. He is also praised for his recordings of the Bach suites (Beethoven-Saal, Hannover, December 1960), which are regarded even now as some of the best versions ever made (released on Deutsche Grammophon "Archive" records). His other discs include LPs of Beethoven's cello sonatas and Elgar's Cello Concerto; these have long since been available on CD.

Fournier was a teacher at the École Normale de Musique in Paris and the Paris Conservatoire from 1937 to 1949. He made his first tour of the United States in 1948 and played to great acclaim in New York and Boston.

His performance in America became an embarrassment when it was revealed in 1949 that Fournier had collaborated with the Nazis during the occupation of France. He was found to have performed 82 times on "Radio-Paris" – a German station – for which he had been paid a total of 192,400 francs. In France, the "National Purging Committee's Professional Branch for Dramatic and Lyric Artists and Performing Musicians" had found him guilty of collaboration, and had banned him from performing for a period of six months.

In the '50s he toured South America, often accompanied by Alfredo Rossi, a personal friend and former colleague during his early days in Italy and Spain.

After 1956, he made his home in Switzerland, although he never relinquished his French citizenship. He received the dedication of both Bohuslav Martinů's Cello Concerto No. 1 (1930, rev. 1939, 1955) and Francis Poulenc's Cello Sonata (1948).

In 1963, he was made a member of the Legion of Honour. He continued performing in public until two years before his death at the age of 79. Until the end of his life, he taught privately at his home in Geneva: the cellists Julian Lloyd Webber and Rocco Filippini were among his pupils.

His son Jean-Pierre became a pianist performing under the name of Jean Fonda.

Fournier played three instruments: a Jean-Baptiste Vuillaume 1863, a Matteo Goffriller 1722 (now played by Valentin Erben of Austria) and a rare Charles Adolphe Maucotel 1849. With the Maucoutel he played the last 18 years of his career and made all his recordings.

== Awards and recognitions ==
Grand Prix du Disque:

- Pierre Fournier, Rafael Kubelik Antonin Dvorak: Cello Concerto – recording released in 1955

Grammy Award for Best Chamber Music Performance:

- Pierre Fournier, Arthur Rubinstein & Henryk Szeryng for Schubert: Trios No. 1 in B Flat, Op. 99 and No. 2 in E Flat, Op. 100 (1976)
- Pierre Fournier, Arthur Rubinstein & Henryk Szeryng for Brahms: Trios (Complete)/Schumann: Trio No. 1 in D Minor (1975)
