= List of cellists =

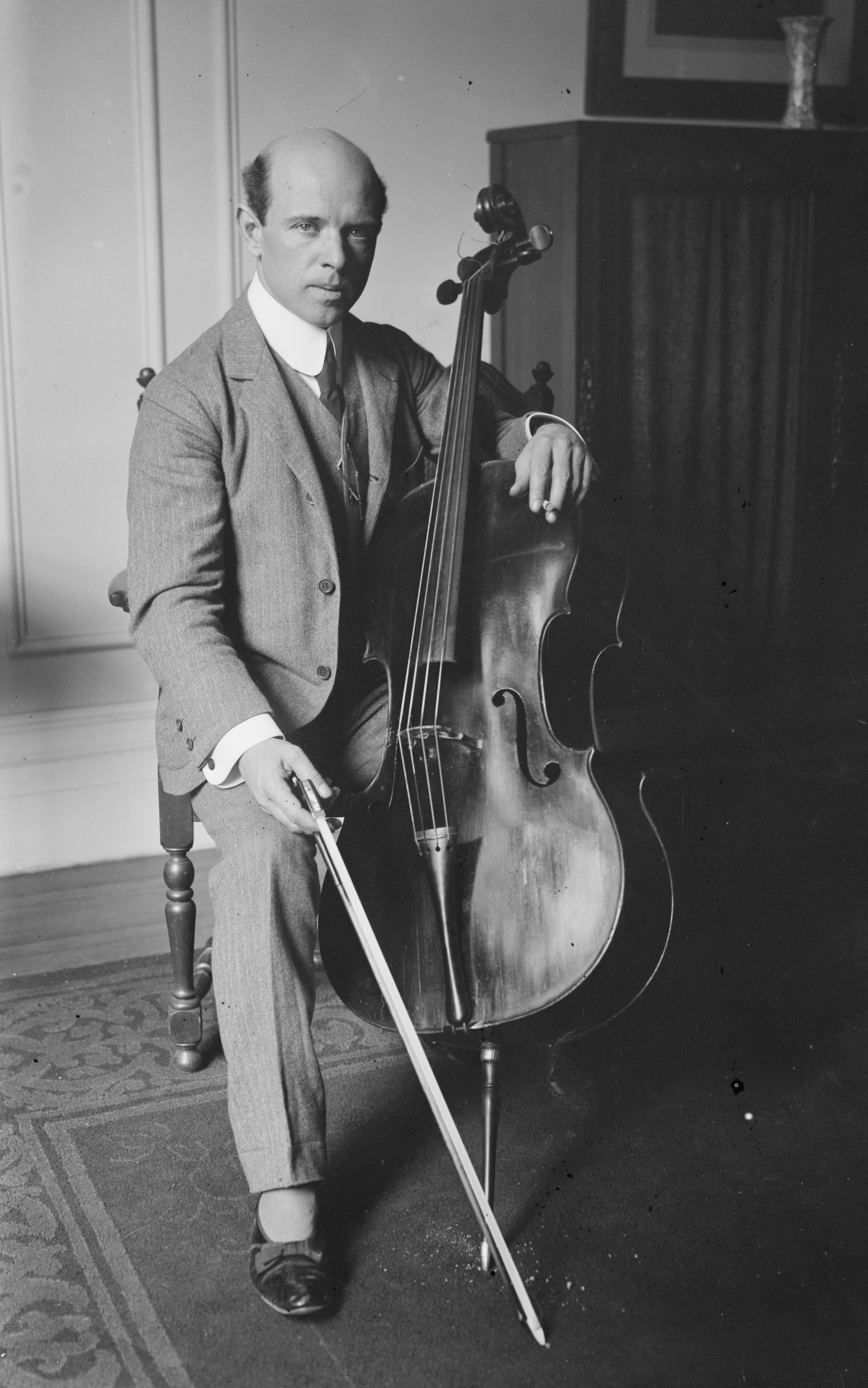
Pablo Casals, considered to be one of the most influential cellists

A person who plays the cello is called a cellist. This list of notable cellists is divided into four categories: 1) Living Classical Cellists; 2) Non-Classical Cellists; 3) Deceased Classical Cellists; 4) Deceased Non-Classical Cellists.

The cello (/ˈtʃɛloʊ/ chel-oh; plural cellos or celli) is a bowed string instrument with four strings tuned in perfect fifths. It is a member of the violin family of musical instruments.

To keep the lists usable and useful, please include only those who have attained notability as cellists. Please do not add those known for other activities who happen to play or have played the cello either professionally (e.g., the conductor Arturo Toscanini and composer Heitor Villa-Lobos) or privately (e.g., the actress Rosamund Pike). Also, please do not add people without Wikipedia articles, unless you can also add a reference to verify the person's notability as a cellist.

== Living classical cellists ==
=== A ===
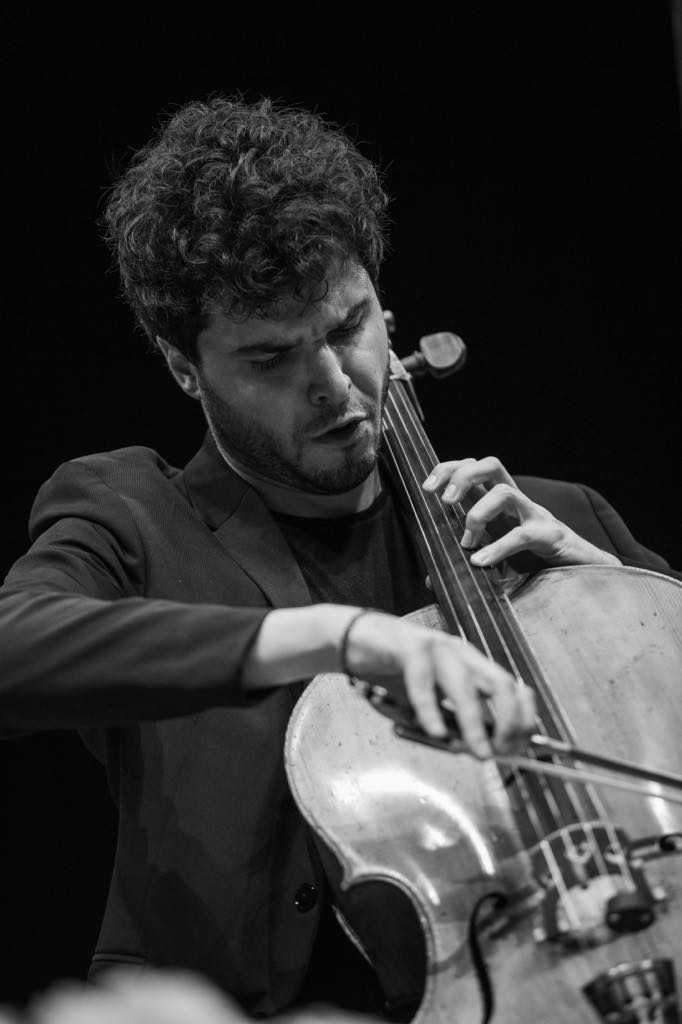
Jamal Aliyev

- Jamal Aliyev (born 1993, Azerbaijan)
- Nicolas Altstaedt (born 1982, Germany)
- Tanya Anisimova (born 1966, Russian, also a composer)
- Julian Armour (born 1960, Canadian)

=== B ===
Maya Beiser

- Michael Bach (born 1958, Germany, also composer and visual artist)
- Soo Bae (born 1977, Korean-Canadian, living in United States)
- Zuill Bailey (born 1972, United States)
- Alexander Baillie (born 1956, England)
- Matthew Barley (born 1965, England)
- Maya Beiser (born 1963, Israel, moved to the United States, new classical music)
- Emmanuelle Bertrand (born 1973, France)
- Coenraad Bloemendal (born 1946, Netherlands, moved to Canada)
- Mike Block (born 1982, United States)
- Becca Bradley (born 1991, United States)
- Andreas Brantelid (born 1987, Denmark)
- Carter Brey (born 1954, United States)
- František Brikcius (living, Czech Republic)
- Denis Brott (born 1950, Canada)
- Mario Brunello (born 1960, Italy)
- Max Beitan (born 1986, Russia)
- Margarita Balanas (born 1993, Latvia)

=== C ===
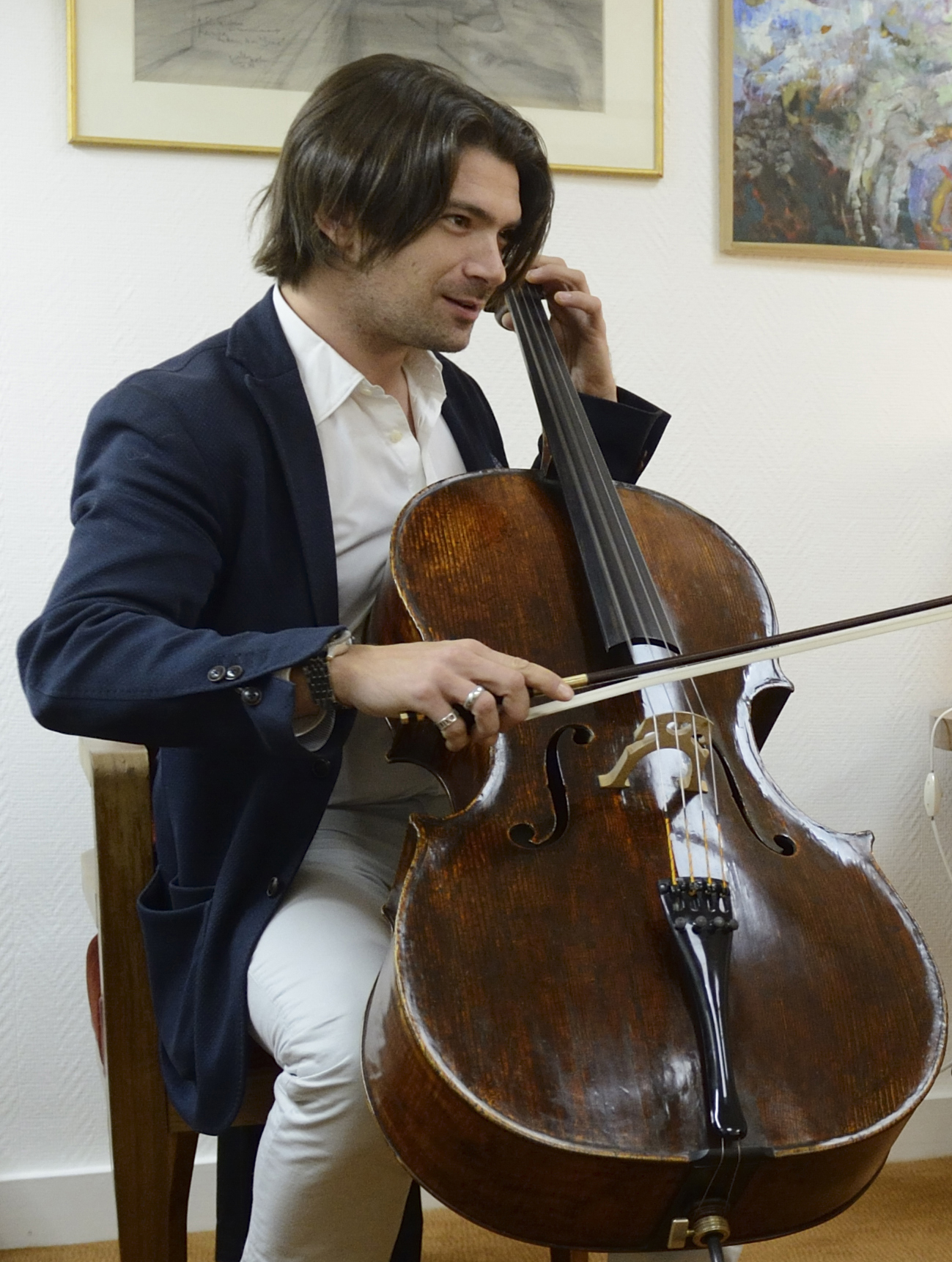
Gautier Capuçon

- Gautier Capuçon (born 1981, France)
- Colin Carr (born 1957, England)
- Phoebe Carrai (born 1955, United States, baroque and other historical styles)
- Jesús Castro-Balbi (living, of Peruvian descent, moved from France to the United States)
- Rosa Cedrón (born 1972, Spain, also a singer)
- Han-na Chang (born 1982, South Korea, also a conductor)
- Young-Chang Cho (born 1958, South Korea)
- Telalit Charsky (born 1986, Israel)
- Chu Yibing (born 1966, China)
- Myung-wha Chung (born 1944, Korean)
- Lluís Claret (born 1951, Andorra)
- Natalie Clein (living, England)
- Bruno Cocset (born 1963, France)
- Robert Cohen (born 1959, England)
- Christophe Coin (born 1958, France)
- Emilio Colón (born in Puerto Rico, also a composer and conductor)
- Kristina Reiko Cooper (living, United States)
- Marc Coppey (born 1969, France)
- Nathan Chan (born 1993, United States)

=== D ===
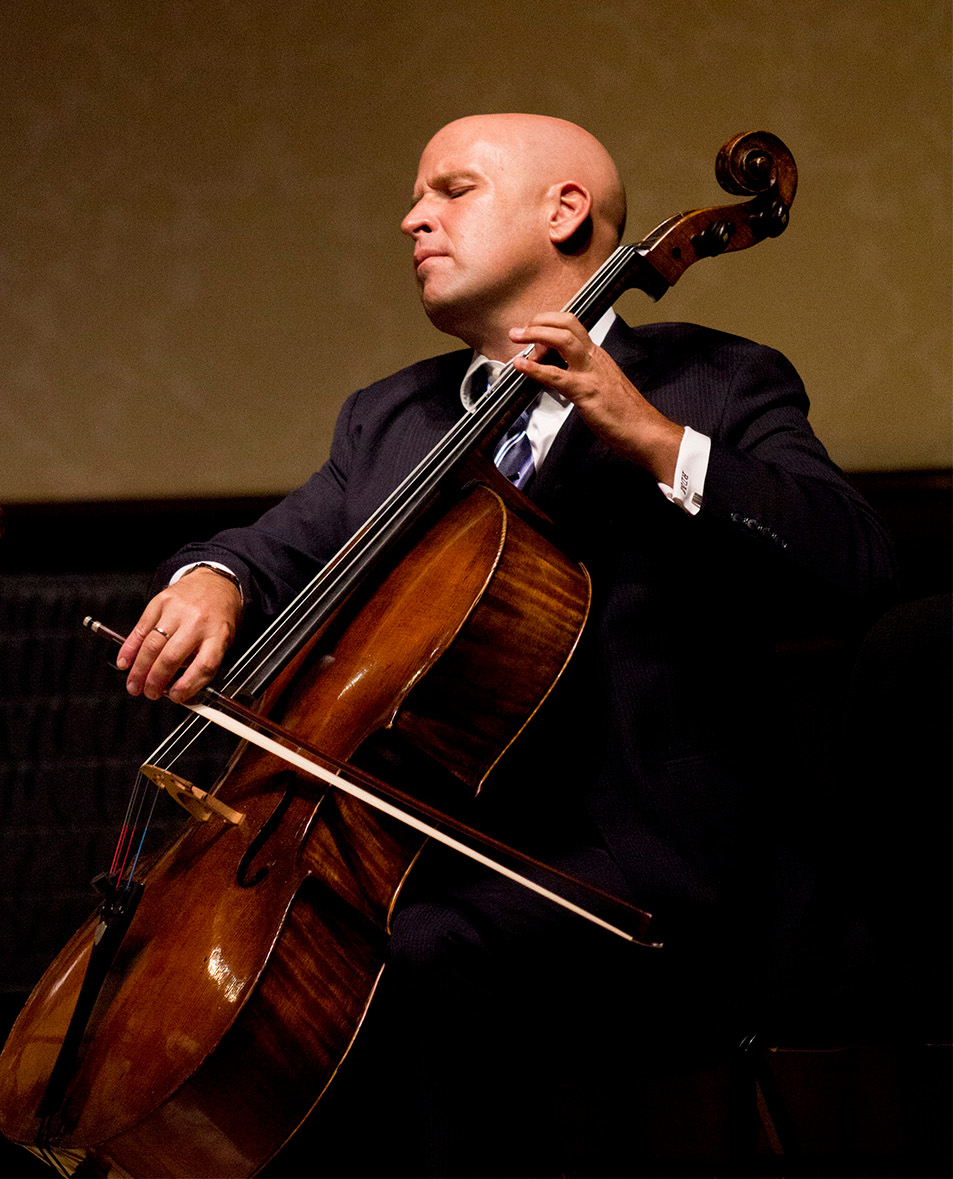
Robert deMaine

- Caroline Dale (born 1965, England, classical and popular music)
- Nadine Deleury (France)
- Robert deMaine (born 1969, United States)
- William De Rosa (living, United States)
- Rohan de Saram (born 1939, England, also contemporary music)
- Roel Dieltiens (born 1957, Belgium, baroque and modern cello)
- Denise Djokic (born 1980, Canada)

=== E ===
- Angela East (born 1949, UK), continuo player and member of Red Priest
- Timothy Eddy (living, United States), a founding member of the Orion String Quartet

=== F ===
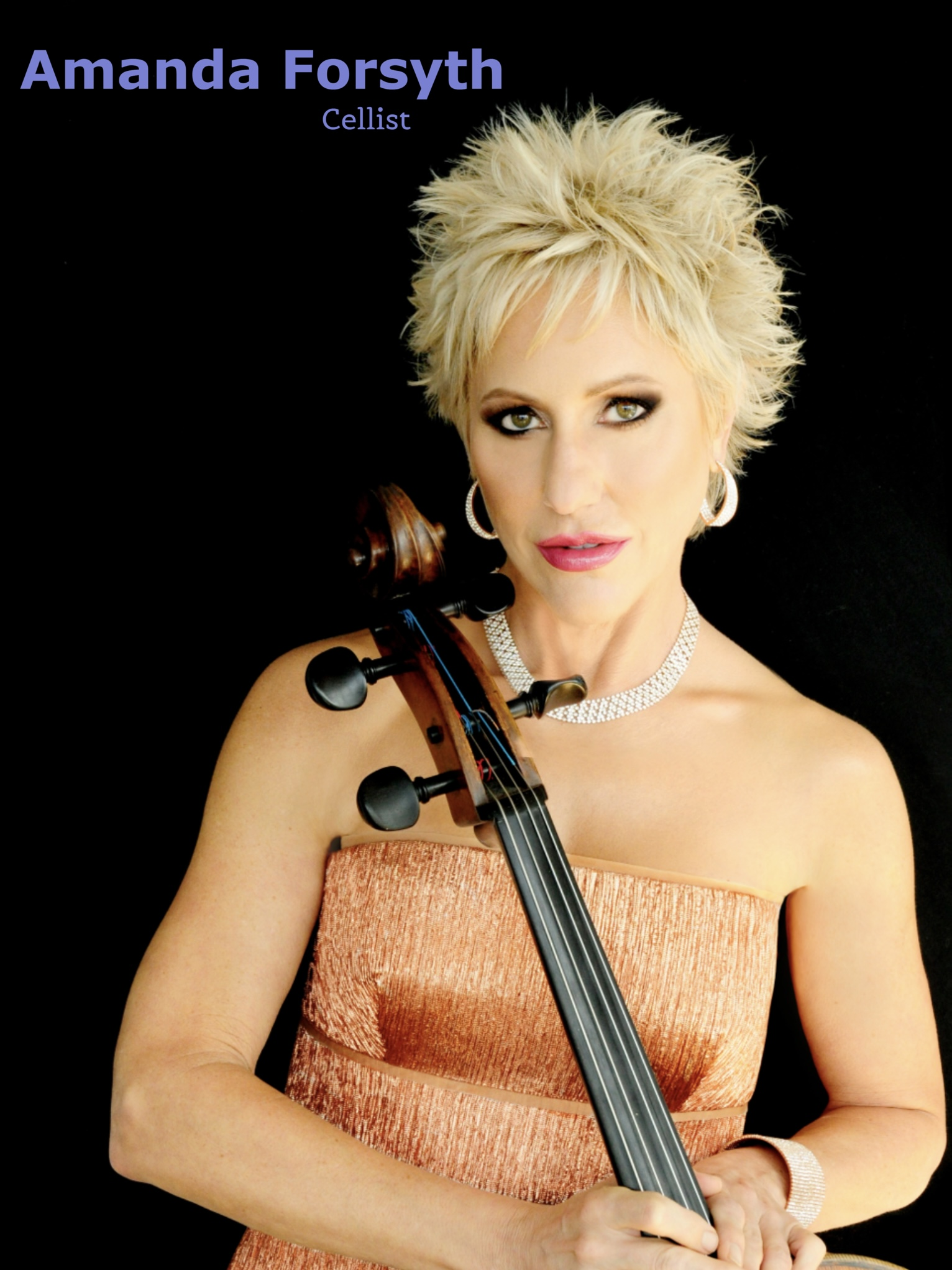
Amanda Forsyth

- Yosif Feigelson (born 1955, Latvia)
- Emmanuel Feldman (born 1965, United States)
- Pablo Ferrández (born 1991, Spain)
- David Finckel (born 1951, United States, founding former member of the Emerson String Quartet)
- C. Myron Flippin (United States)
- Amanda Forsyth (born 1966, Canada)
- Eugene Friesen (born 1952, United States)
- Michaela Fukačová (living, Czech Republic)

=== G ===
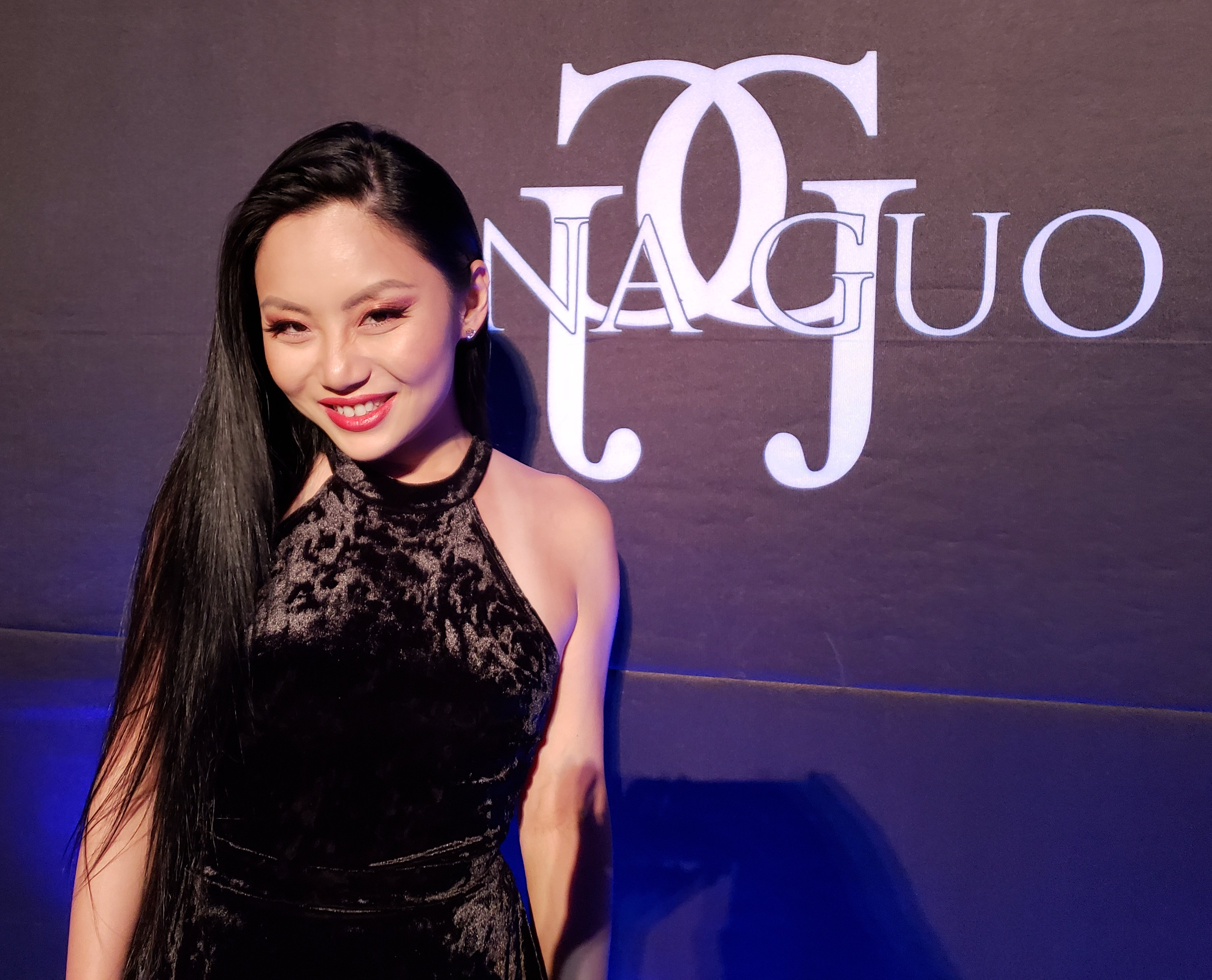
Tina Guo

- Sol Gabetta (born 1981, Argentina)
- Ophélie Gaillard (born 1974, France)
- Alban Gerhardt (born 1969, Germany)
- Kristin von der Goltz (born 1966, Germany, period instrument)
- David Geringas (born 1946, Lithuania)
- Igor Gavrish (born 1945, Russian)
- Rudolf Gleißner (born 1942, Germany)
- Tina Guo (born 1985 in China, raised and living in the United States, also an electric cellist and erhuist)
- Natalia Gutman (born 1942, Russian)

=== H ===
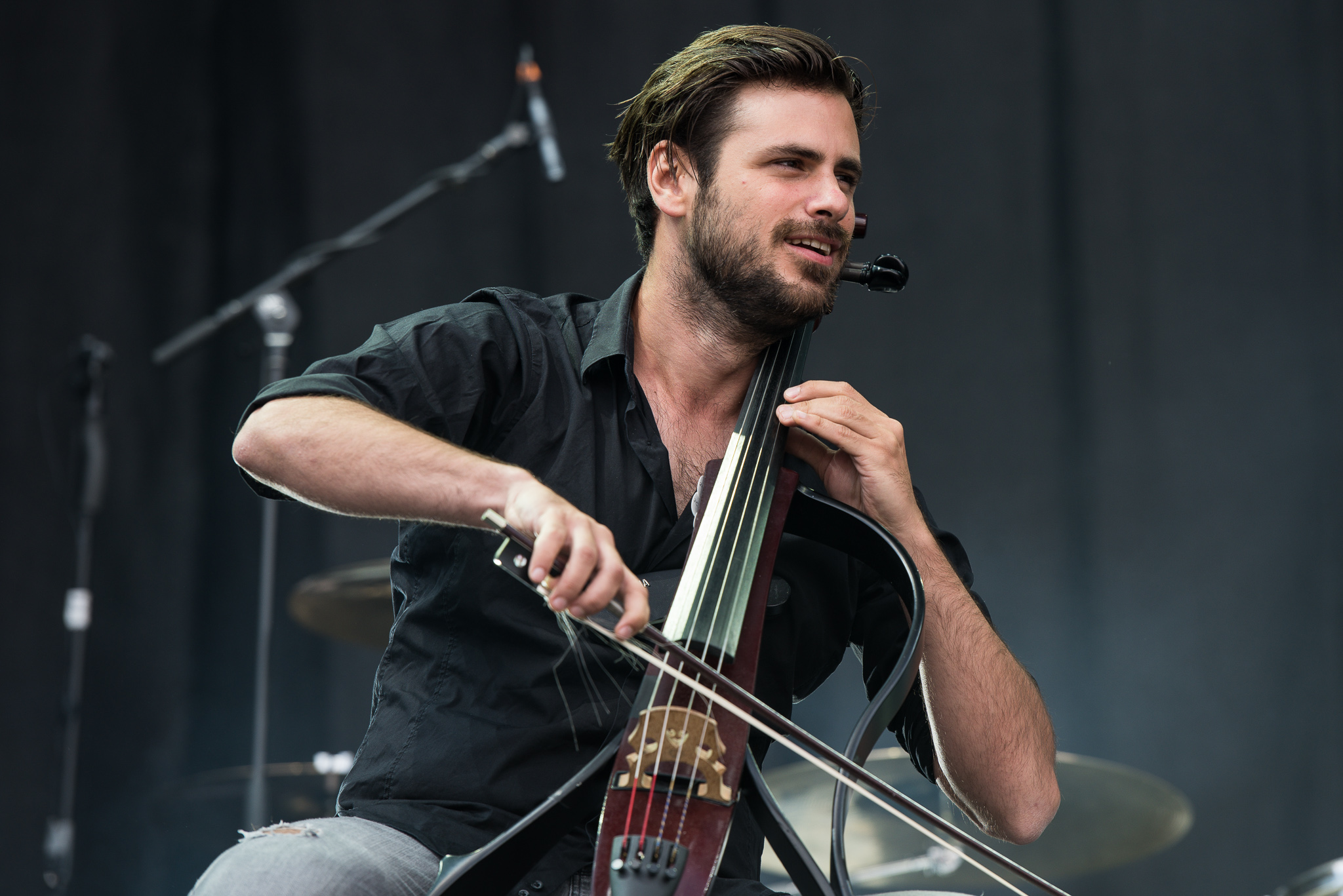
Stjepan Hauser

- Matt Haimovitz (born 1970, Israel)
- Narek Hakhnazaryan (born 1988, Armenia)
- Yehuda Hanani (born Jerusalem, Israel)
- Richard Harwood (born 1979, England)
- Ofra Harnoy (born 1965, Israel)
- Stjepan Hauser (born 1986, Croatia)
- Frans Helmerson (born 1945, Sweden)
- Catherine Hewgill (born 1963, Australia) - Principal Cello Sydney Symphony Orchestra
- Desmond Hoebig (born 1961, Canada)
- Louise Hopkins (born 1968, England)
- Dale Henderson (cellist) (New York) - Founder of Bach in the Subways
- Sébastien Hurtaud (living, France)
- Julia Hagen (born 1995, Austria)

=== I ===
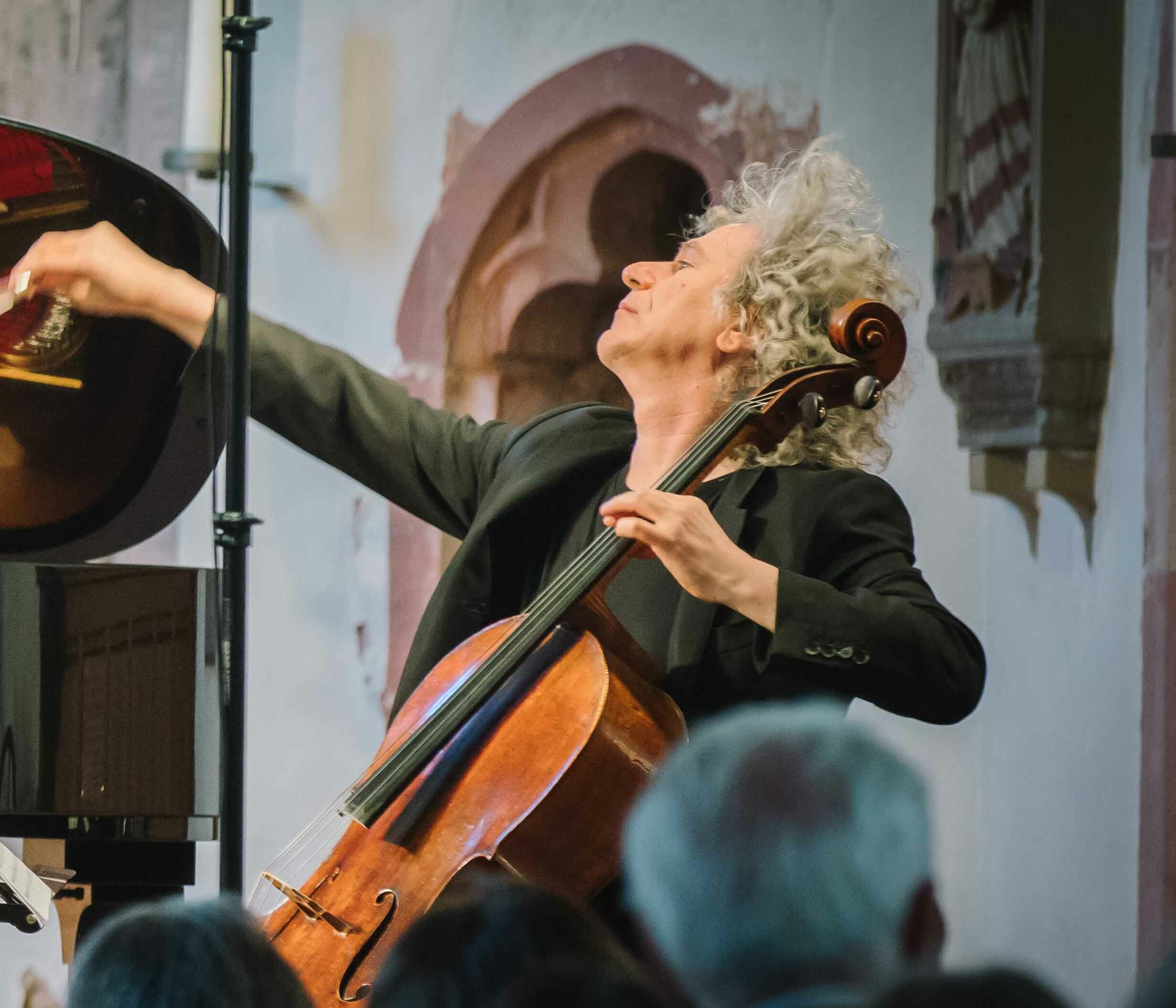
Steven Isserlis

- Steven Isserlis (born 1958, England)
- Sergei Istomin (Russian, resides in Belgium), period instruments, also plays viola da gamba
- Yuki Ito (born 1990, Japan)

=== J ===
- Ádám Jávorkai (born 1977, Hungary)
- Guy Johnston (born 1981, England)

=== K ===
- Sheku Kanneh-Mason (born 1999, United Kingdom)
- Ivan Karizna (born 1992, Belarus)
- Anssi Karttunen (born 1960, Finland)
- Paul Katz (living, United States), founding member of the Cleveland Quartet
- Jonah Kim (born 1988, South Korea)
- Ralph Kirshbaum (born 1946, United States)
- Maria Kliegel (born 1952, Germany)
- Jacob Koranyi (born 1983, Sweden)
- Nina Kotova (born 1969 in Soviet Union, lives in the United States)
- Maxim Kozlov (active 1995 - present, born in Russia, lives in the United States)
- Anatoli Krastev (born 1947, Bulgaria)
- Josef Krecmer (born 1958, Czech Republic)
- Wieland Kuijken (born 1938), Belgium, baroque cello and viola da gamba, also a conductor
- Friedemann Kupsa (born 1943, Austria)
- Aage Kvalbein (born 1947, Norway)

=== L ===
- David Lale (Australian cellist) (born 1962, England)
- David Lale (British cellist) (born 1981, England)
- Gerard Le Feuvre (born 1962, Channel Islands)
- Trey Lee Chui-yee (born 1973, Hong Kong)
- Mats Lidström (born 1959, Sweden)
- Jaap ter Linden (born 1947, Netherlands), baroque cello
- Gavriel Lipkind (born 1977, Israel)
- Hugh Livingston (born 1969)
- Julian Lloyd Webber (born 1951, England)

=== M ===
- Yo-Yo Ma (born 1955 in France, raised and living in the United States)
- Mischa Maisky (born 1948, Latvia)
- Brian Manker (living, Canada)
- Jonathan Manson (living, born in Scotland), period instruments, also plays viola da gamba
- Alain Meunier (born 1942, France)
- Antônio Meneses (born 1957, Brazil)
- Ailbhe McDonagh (born 1982, Ireland)
- Ivan Monighetti (born 1948, Poland)
- John Moran (born 1963, United States), baroque cello
- Truls Mørk (born 1961, Norway)
- Johannes Moser (born 1979, Germany, lives in Canada)
- Philippe Muller (born 1946, France)
- Daniel Müller-Schott (born 1976, Germany)

=== N ===
- Steven Sharp Nelson (born 1977, United States), member Of The Piano Guys
- Clancy Newman (born 1977, United States)
- Şerban Nichifor (born 1954, Romania), also a composer
- Arto Noras (born 1942, Finland)

=== O ===
- Kevin Olusola (born 1988, United States)
- Ouyang Nana (born 2000, China)

=== P ===
- Johann Sebastian Paetsch (born 1964, United States)
- Paolo Pandolfo (born 1964, Italy, viola da gamba)
- Angela Park (born 1987, United States)
- Vito Paternoster (born circa 1963 [estimated from other dates], Italy, also a conductor and composer)
- Amit Peled (born 1973, Israel)
- Samuli Peltonen (born 1981, Finland)
- David Pereira (born 1953, Australia)
- Miklós Perényi (born 1948, Hungary)
- Vladimir Perlin (born 1942 in Soviet Union, lives in Belarus, also a conductor and pedagogue)
- Luigi Piovano (living, Italy, baroque and modern cellos, also a conductor)
- Anthony Pleeth (born 1948, England, baroque cello, son and student of William Pleeth)
- Carlos Prieto (born 1937, Mexico)
- Mark Prihodko (born 1997, Belarus, lives in United States)

=== Q ===
- Jean-Guihen Queyras (born 1967 in Canada, lives in France, plays baroque and modern cellos)
- Misha Quint (born 1960 in Soviet Union, moved to the United States)

=== R ===
- Giovanni Ricciardi (born 1968, Italy)
- Sharon Robinson (born 1949, United States)
- (Kyril) Kirill Rodin (born 1963, Russian)
- Sergei Roldugin (born 1951, Russia)
- Shauna Rolston (born 1967, Canada)
- Joshua Roman (born 1983, United States)
- Alexei Romanenko (born 1974 in Soviet Union, moved to the United States)
- Nathaniel Rosen (born 1948, United States)
- Martti Rousi (born 1960, Finland)
- Alexander Rudin (born 1960, Russian)
- Martin Rummel (born 1974, Austria)

=== S ===
- John Sant’Ambrogio (born 1932, United States)
- Sara Sant'Ambrogio (born 1962, United States)
- Julian Schwarz (born 1991, United States)
- Inbal Segev (born in Israel, lives in the United States)
- Tessa Seymour (born 1993, United States)
- Jacob Shaw (born 1988, born in United Kingdom, lives in Denmark)
- Fred Sherry (born 1948, United States)
- Andrew Shulman (born 1960, England, also a conductor and composer)
- Vedran Smailović (born 1956, Bosnia and Herzegovina, lives in Northern Ireland)
- Brinton Averil Smith (born 1969, in Royal Oak Michigan)
- Giovanni Sollima (born 1962, Italy, also a composer)
- Jeffrey Solow (born 1949, Los Angeles)
- Kian Soltani (born 1992, Austria)
- Julian Steckel (born 1982, Germany)
- Pierre Strauch (born 1958, France)
- Peter Stumpf (United States)
- Luka Šulić (born 1987, Slovenia)
- Hidemi Suzuki (born 1957, Japan, period instruments, also a conductor)

=== T ===
- Stéphane Tétreault (born 1993, Canada)
- Camille Thomas (born 1988, France)
- Ronald Thomas (born 1952, United States)
- Doron Toister (born 1957, Israel)
- Fiona Thompson (born in England, lives in the United States)
- Bion Tsang (born 1967, United States)

=== U ===
- Frances-Marie Uitti (born 1946, United States, also a composer)

=== V ===
- Laura van der Heijden (born 1997, England)
- Jan Vogler (born 1964 in Germany, lives in the United States)

=== W ===
- Nathan Waks (born 1951, Australia)
- Christine Walevska (born 1943, Los Angeles, California)
- Raphael Wallfisch (born 1953, England)
- Jian Wang (born 1968, China)
- Wendy Warner (living, United States)
- Graham Waterhouse (born 1962, England, also a composer)
- Paul Watkins (born 1970, Wales)
- Alisa Weilerstein (born 1982, United States)
- Paul Wiancko (born 1983, United States, also a composer)
- Peter Wiley (born 1955, United States)
- Dominique de Williencourt (born 1959, France, also a composer)
- Pieter Wispelwey (born 1962, Netherlands)

=== XYZ ===
- Sung-Won Yang (living, South Korea)
- Daniel Yeadon (born 1967, England, lives in Australia)
- Dmitry Yablonsky (living, Russia)
- Igor Zubkovsky (Russian, resides in the United States)

== Living non-classical cellists ==
=== B ===
- Thomas Batuello (born 1994, TV work, rock music)
- Matt Brubeck (born 1961, United States, jazz music)

=== C ===
- Blossom Caldarone (born 1999, England, indie pop/rock)
- Isobel Campbell (born 1976, Scotland, indie rock)
- Grace Chatto (born 1985, England, member of Clean Bandit.)
- Gretta Cohn (living, United States, rock musician and radio producer)
- Melora Creager (born 1966, United States, rock music)

=== D ===
- Caroline Dale (born 1965, England, classical and popular music)

=== E ===
- Rushad Eggleston (born 1979, United States, cello rock)

=== F ===
- Gideon Freudmann (living, eclectic composer, cello rock)
- Erik Friedlander (born 1960, United States, jazz)
- Eugene Friesen (born 1952, United States, jazz/improvisational cellist)

=== G ===
- Károly Garam (born 1941 in Hungary, moved to Finland, popular musics)
- Hildur Guðnadóttir (born 1982, Iceland, lives in Germany, solo and in electronica bands)
- Tina Guo (born 1985, China)

=== H ===
- Natalie Haas (living, United States, Celtic folk music)
- Melissa Hasin (born 1954, United States, popular music)
- Stjepan Hauser (born 1986, Croatia, part of 2Cellos)
- Svante Henryson (born 1963, Sweden, jazz, rock, also a composer)
- Ivan Hussey (living, leader of Celloman, fusion music)

=== J ===
- Jorane (born 1975, Canada, alternative singer-songwriter)

=== K ===
- Zoë Keating (born 1972, Canada, cello rock and classical, also a soundtrack composer)
- Julia Kent (living, born in Canada, cello rock)
- Perttu Kivilaakso (born 1978, Finland, from cello metal band Apocalyptica)
- Brent Kutzle (born 1987, United States, in band OneRepublic)

=== L ===
- Caroline Lavelle (living, British singer-songwriter and cellist)
- Alexandra Lawn (from indie rock band Ra Ra Riot)
- Ana Lenchantin (living, United States, from progressive rock band Into the Presence)
- Max Lilja (born 1975, Finland, from thrash metal band Hevein)
- Fred Lonberg-Holm (born 1962, United States, jazz)
- Paavo Lötjönen (born 1968, Finland, from cello metal band Apocalyptica)

=== M ===
- Antero Manninen (born 1973, Finland, cello metal)
- Martin McCarrick (born 1962, England, rock)
- Kerry Minnear (born 1948, England, multi-instrumentalist, progressive rock with 70s band Gentle Giant)

=== N ===
- Steven Sharp Nelson (born 1977, member of "The Piano Guys")

=== P ===
- Neyla Pekarek (born 1986, United States, also a vocalist, from folk rock band The Lumineers)

=== R ===
- Saskia Rao-de Haas (born 1971, Netherlands, primarily known for Hindustani classical music, also a composer)
- Tomeka Reid (born 1977, United States, also a composer)
- Ernst Reijseger (born 1954, Netherlands, improvisation)
- Hank Roberts (born 1954, United States, jazz)

=== S ===
- Jane Scarpantoni (living, United States, alternative rock)
- Philip Sheppard (living, England, also a composer)
- Ben Sollee (born 1983, United States, singer-songwriter, eclectic genres)
- Luka Šulić (born 1987, Croatia, part of 2Cellos)
- Mark Summer (born 1958, United States, original cellist of Turtle Island String Quartet)

=== T ===
- Martin Tillman (born 1964, Switzerland, also a composer)
- Eicca Toppinen (born 1975, Finland, from cello metal band Apocalyptica)
- Matt Turner (living, United States)

=== W ===
- Kanon Wakeshima (born 1988, Japan, also a vocalist)
- Aubrey Webber (living, United States, nerd-folk with The Doubleclicks)
- Gay-Yee Westerhoff (born 1973, England, of crossover band Bond)

=== XYZ ===
- Alexander Zhiroff (born 1951, Russian, world music)

== Deceased classical cellists ==
=== A ===
- Claus Adam (1917–1983, United States, also a composer)
- Joseph Alexander (c.1770–1822, Germany)
- Diran Alexanian (1881–1954, Armenia)
- Francesco Aliani (1762–1812, Italy)
- Karl Andersen (1903–1970, Norway, also a composer)
- Johann Gottfried Arnold (1773–1806, Germany, also a composer)
- Olivier Aubert (1763–c.1830, France, also a composer)

=== B ===
- Felix Battanchon (1814–1893, France)
- Paul Bazelaire (1886–1958, France)
- Hugo Becker (1863–1941, Germany)
- Auguste van Biene (1849–1913, Netherlands, moved to England)
- Luigi Boccherini (1743–1805), Italy, primarily a composer)
- Karl Leopold Böhm (1806–1859, Austria)
- Gaetano Braga (1829–1907, Italy, also a composer)
- Jean-Baptiste Bréval (1753–1823, France)
- Christopher Bunting (1924–2005, England)
- Friedrich Buxbaum (1869–1948, Austria)
- Anner Bylsma (1934–2019, Netherlands, baroque cello)

=== C ===
- Pau Casals (1876–1973, Spain, also a composer and conductor)
- Juan Ruiz Casaux (1889–1972, Spain)
- Gaspar Cassadó (1897–1966, Spain, also a composer)
- Giacobbe Cervetto (died 1783, Italy, moved to England)
- James Cervetto (1748–1837, UK)
- Mabel Chaplin (1870–1960, UK, member of the Chaplin Trio; also played viola ga gamba)
- Giovanni Battista Cirri (1724–1808, Italy, also a composer)
- Jennifer Ward Clarke (1935–2015, UK)
- Hugo Cole (1917-1995, UK)
- Orlando Cole (1908–2010, United States)
- Nelson Cooke (1919–2018, Australia, career partly in UK)
- Bernhard Cossmann (1822–1910, Germany)
- John Crosdill (1751–1825, UK)
- Douglas Cummings (1944–2014, UK)

=== D ===
- Karl Davydov (1838–1889, Russia)
- Jules Delsart (1844–1900, France)
- Jean Deplace (1944–2015, France)
- Friedrich Dotzauer (1783–1860, Germany)
- Karl Drechsler (1800–1873, Germany)
- Jean-Louis Duport (1749–1819, France, brother of Jean-Pierre Duport)
- Jean-Pierre Duport (1741–1818, France, brother of Jean-Louis Duport)
- Jacqueline du Pré (1945–1987, England)

=== E ===
- Maurice Eisenberg (1900–1972, United States)

=== F ===
- Emanuel Feuermann (1902–1942, born in Ukraine, died in the United States)
- Rocco Filippini (1943–2021, Switzerland)
- Wilhelm Fitzenhagen (1848–1890, Germany)
- Pierre Fournier (1906–1986, France)
- Auguste Franchomme (1808–1884, France)
- Ricardo Roberto Francia (1932–2021, Argentina)
- Jacques Franco-Mendès (1816–1889, Netherlands)

=== G ===
- Domenico Gabrielli (d.1690, Italy)
- Raya Garbousova (1909–1997, born in Georgia, Russian Empire)
- Maurice Gendron (1920–1990, France)
- Gwyneth George (1920–2016, UK)
- Georg Goltermann (1825–1876, Germany, also a composer)
- Bernard Greenhouse (1916–2011, United States, founding member of the Beaux Arts Trio)
- Friedrich Grützmacher (1832–1903, Germany)

=== H ===
- Lynn Harrell (1944–2020, United States)
- Beatrice Harrison (1892–1965, England)
- Robert Hausmann (1852–1909, Germany)
- Victor Herbert (1859–1924, Ireland, primarily remembered as a composer, also a conductor)
- Florence Hooton (1912-1988, England)
- Kato van der Hoeven (1877 –1959, Netherlands)

=== I ===
- Alexander Ivashkin (1948–2014, Russian)

=== J ===
- Antonio Janigro (1918–1989, Italy)
- Ivor James (1882–1963, British)
- Nicasio Jiménez (1849–1891, Cuba)
- Vivian Joseph (1916-2005, British)

=== K ===
- John Kennedy (1922–1980, born in England, moved to Australia)
- Lauri Kennedy (1896–1985, born in Australia)
- Julius Klengel (1859–1933, Germany)
- Sviatoslav Knushevitsky (1907–1963, Russia)
- Antonín Kohout (1919–2013, Czech)
- Otto van Koppenhagen (1897–1978, Netherlands)
- Antonín Kraft (1752–1820, Czech)
- Joel Krosnick (1941–2025, United States), was member of Juilliard String Quartet

=== L ===
- Salvatore Lanzetti (1710–1780, Italian)
- Robert Lindley (1776–1855, British)
- Joseph Linke (1783–1837, Austria)
- Martin Lovett (1927–2020, England)

=== M ===
- Fritz Magg (1914–1997, born in Vienna, moved to the United States)
- Enrico Mainardi (1897-1976, Italy)
- Rudolf Matz (1901–1988, Croatia)
- Joseph Merk (1795–1852, Austria)
- Frank Miller (1912–1986, United States)
- Georges Miquelle (1894–1977, born in France, moved to the United States)
- Víctor Mirecki Larramat (1947–1921, born in France, lived in Spain)
- Lorne Munroe (1924–2020, United States)
- Charlotte Moorman (1933–1991, United States, performance art)
- May Mukle (1880–1963, British)

=== N ===
- André Navarra (1911–1988, France)
- Zara Nelsova (1918–2002, Canada)

=== O ===
- Jacques Offenbach (1819–1880, born in Germany, lived in France)

=== P ===
- Siegfried Palm (1927–2005, Germany)
- Aldo Parisot (1918–2018, Brazil, United States)
- Leslie Parnas (1931–2022, United States)
- Boris Pergamenschikow (1948–2004, born in Soviet Union, moved to Germany)
- Gregor Piatigorsky (1903–1976, born in Russia, moved to United States)
- Alfredo Piatti (1822–1901, Italy)
- William Pleeth (1916–1999, England, teacher of Jacqueline du Pré)
- Dominik Połoński (1977–2018, Poland)
- David Popper (1843–1913, Bohemian born, active in Hungary)

=== R ===
- Jean-Marie Raoul (1766–1837, France, also a composer)
- Thelma Reiss (1906–1991, Britain)
- Gábor Rejtő (1916–1987, Hungary)
- Bernhard Romberg (1767–1841, Germany, also a composer)
- Leonard Rose (1918–1984, United States)
- Mstislav Rostropovich (1927–2007, Russia, also a conductor)

=== S ===
- Karel Pravoslav Sádlo (1898–1971, Czech)
- Miloš Sádlo (1912–2003, Czech)
- Felix Salmond (1880–1952, England)
- Heinrich Schiff (1951–2016, Austria)
- Franz Schmidt (1874–1939, Austria, also a pianist and a composer)
- Georg Schnéevoigt (1872–1947, Finnish, also a conductor)
- Eleonore Schoenfeld (1925–2007, born in Slovenia, died in the United States)
- Joseph Schuster (1903–1969, born in Turkey, died in the United States)
- Adrien François Servais (1807–1866, Belgium)
- Daniil Shafran (1923–1997, Russian)
- Natalia Shakhovskaya (1935–2017, Russian)
- Harvey Shapiro (1911–2007, American)
- Anna Shuttleworth (1927–2021, England)
- František Sláma (1923–2004, Czech)
- Benyamin Sönmez (1983–2011, Turkey)
- George Sopkin (1914–2008, United States)
- David Soyer (1923–2010, United States)
- William Henry Squire (1871–1963, England)
- János Starker (1924–2013, born in Hungary, died in the United States)
- Peter Steiner (1928-2003, Germany)
- Leo Stern (1862–1904, England)
- Guilhermina Suggia (1885–1950, Portugal)

=== T ===
- Paul Tortelier (1914–1990, France)
- Anton Träg (1819–1860, Austria)

=== V ===
- Laszlo Varga (1924–2014, Hungary)
- Aleksandr Verzhbilovich (1850–1911, Russia)
- J. Louis von der Mehden (1873–1954, United States)

=== W ===
- Terence Weil (1921–1995, England)
- August Wenzinger (1905–1996, Switzerland)
- Donald Whitton (1923–2018, Canada)
- Maximilian Willmann (1767–1813, Germany)

== Deceased non-classical cellists ==
=== A ===
- Muhal Richard Abrams (1930-2017), United States, jazz, also a composer and multi-instrumentalist)

=== B ===
- David Baker (1931–2016, United States, jazz composer and performer)

=== C ===
- Tom Cora (1953–1998, United States, experimental jazz and rock)

=== E ===
- Mike Edwards (1948–2010, England, member of the Electric Light Orchestra)

=== H ===
- Tristan Honsinger (born 1949, United States, free jazz and free improvisation)

=== K ===
- Fred Katz (1919–2013, United States, described as "the first real jazz cellist")

=== M ===
- Hugh McDowell (1953–2018, England, cellist with rock bands Electric Light Orchestra and ELO Part II)

=== P ===
- Oscar Pettiford (1922–1960, United States, bebop)
- Kristen Pfaff (1967–1994, United States, alternative rock)

=== R ===
- Arthur Russell (1951–1992, United States, eclectic genres)

== See also ==
- Lists of musicians
