= Prykhodko =

Prykhodko, Prihodko, etc. is a Ukrainian surname. Its Cyrillic spelling Приходько is transliterated from Russian as Prikhodko and from Ukrainian as Prykhodko. Its Belarusian-language spelling is Прыходзька, Prykhodzka. Notable people with the surname include:

- Anton Prykhodko
- Anastasia Prikhodko, Ukrainian retired singer and political activist
- Borys Prykhodko, Ukrainian banker and politician
- Hennadiy Prykhodko
- Hilarion (Prikhodko), born Ivan Prikhodko (1924–2008), Russian priest
- Mark Prihodko, Belarusian-American cellist, producer and entrepreneur
- Natalia Prykhodko, Ukrainian politician
- Oleg Prihodko, Ukrainian tennis player
- Pyatro Prykhodzka (1920–2006), Belarusian poet and translator
- Sergei Prikhodko (footballer, born 1962), Russian football player and coach
- Sergei Prikhodko (footballer, born 1984), Russian football player
- Sergei Prikhodko (politician) (1957–2021), Russian politician
- Klim Prykhodko
- Nazar Prykhodko
- Vladimir Prikhodko (1944–2011), French athlete
