= Sergei Prikhodko =

Sergei Prikhodko may refer to:

- Sergei Prikhodko (footballer, born 1962), Russian football player and coach
- Sergei Prikhodko (footballer, born 1984), Russian football player
- Sergei Prikhodko (politician) (1957–2021), Russian politician
