= Cello techniques =

Cello techniques encompass a diverse set of approaches and methods employed by cellists to master the cello. Various techniques include bowing techniques that dictate the direction and pressure of the bow, as well as different fingerings styles that produce a myriad of tones.

== History of Cello Bow Technique Development from 1785 to 1839 ==
The Austro-Germans and the French have made a substantial impact on the bowing techniques of the cello. Though their styles are somewhat different, each has made a significant mark in music history. There are at least twenty-seven different styles that came from this time, in which the French and Austro-Germans adapted to the newly introduced Tourte bow. There have been many influential players from France who influenced bowing techniques, such as Jean-Pierre Duport, Jean-Baptise-Aimé-Joseph Janson, and Jean Tricklir. They slowly changed the fingering methods of the cello, as there was a perceived notion that using the violin and viola de gamba technique on the cello was detrimental to its style. The bowing technique of placing the fingers on the bow stick above the frog became more widespread as the French valued consistent, beautiful tones above all else. Thus, the French all shared the same techniques for the cello. For the Austro-Germans, their techniques varied from locations inside the Holy Roman Empire. The cellists would use lower bow grips, vibrato, and the down-bow to express emotion and expression through their work. They would not utilize the Tourte bow until the 1800s, and even then they would deviate from the French by holding the bow in an upper grip.

== Add-on to spiccato technique ==
There are multiple ways to play the spiccato technique. There is the “scoop” spiccato, the “ball bounce” spiccato, and the “seesaw” spiccato for the Sautillé technique. The “scoop” method is less percussive compared to the other two types of strokes, as it is closer to a short note on a string than bounced bowings. It can be referred to as a “brushed” stroke, as the bow touches the string like the light, repeated brushstrokes on a canvas. The movement is called the "scoop" method as the player makes a "scoop" motion with their bow.

The “ball bounce” technique is like dribbling a basketball. The bow is repeatedly tapped against the string per stroke, just like how a dribbled basketball repeatedly touches the ground. The resulting sound can be rather loud, brash, and hard, as this technique requires one to strike the string. With that said, this technique can be played softly to play a more pointed spiccato. The tempo used with this technique can vary, although it is usually paired with slower songs.

The “seesaw” spiccato, or sautillé/springbogen is a rather quick and light succession of short notes that go off the string. The word sautillé has its roots in the culinary term sauté, or to cook food in a pan so that it jumps. It is also known as the “uncontrolled” spiccato, in which the tempo is decided by the bouncing properties of the bow and cello than the player.

== Vibrato ==
The pitch perceived by the listener is the midpoint of the extremes of the changing pitch. A vibrato of large amplitude is usually associated with a loud sound, while smaller ones are good with softer sounds.

It is considered beautiful due to a psychological phenomenon that people are more attracted to changes in the environment than steady tones. Cyclic changes can keep people's attention, and thus heard for all its duration. Vibrato that swings irregularly will disturb the music, in which the audience will see it as a poor style or expression made by the player. Thus, one should aim to vibrate the notes evenly. The sound having a regular frequency is the key to play a good-sounding vibrato.

== Ricochet or Jeté ==
This bow technique is like the “seesaw” technique, as it is dribbled against the string. However, the bow is “thrown” or held in such a way that it bounces several times in one direction that the bow is thrown. To play this technique with increased volume, individual bow strokes are given to each note played that needs to have high volume. There is also the arpeggiated ricochet, in which the ricochet technique is done across multiple strings. The bow is to hit different strings separately to effectively play this technique.
