= Aliani =

Aliani is a surname. Notable people with the surname include:

- Fazila Aliani (born 1945), Pakistani politician and activist
- Francesco Aliani (1762–1812), Italian cellist

== See also ==
- Alians, Bulgarian Shi'a order
