= Ivan Karizna =

Belarusian-born French cellist

Ivan Karizna (born 7 February 1992) is a Belarusian-born French cellist. He won third prize at the International Tchaikovsky Competition in 2011 and fifth prize at the first cello edition of the Queen Elisabeth Competition in 2017, where he also received the Canvas/Klara and Musiq'3 audience prizes.

Karizna has appeared as a soloist with orchestras including the Rundfunk-Sinfonieorchester Berlin, Netherlands Philharmonic Orchestra, Rotterdam Philharmonic Orchestra, Frankfurt Radio Symphony, MDR Symphony Orchestra, Brussels Philharmonic, Montreal Symphony Orchestra, Dresden Philharmonic, Sydney Symphony Orchestra, Adelaide Symphony Orchestra, Queensland Symphony Orchestra and West Australian Symphony Orchestra.

== Early life and education ==
Karizna was born in Dzyatlava, Belarus, and grew up in a family of musicians. His father is a composer, his mother a pianist and his older sister a violinist.

He began studying music as a child and started cello lessons at the age of seven with Belarusian cellist and pedagogue Vladimir Perlin. From 1999 to 2009 he studied in Minsk under Perlin.

In 2009, aged 17, Karizna moved to France after being admitted to the Conservatoire National Supérieur de Musique et de Danse de Paris, where he studied with Jérôme Pernoo. He completed his Licence and Master's degree before continuing in the Conservatoire's third-cycle Diplôme d'Artiste Interprète programme.

From 2016 to 2020 he undertook Professional Studies at the Kronberg Academy with Frans Helmerson, supported by the Dettmer/Storch patronage. He was subsequently a Kronberg Academy Fellow from 2020 to 2023. At the 2018 Kronberg Academy Cello Masterclasses he received the Boris Pergamenschikow Scholarship.

== Competitions and early career ==
In 2010, Karizna represented Belarus at the Eurovision Young Musicians competition in Vienna. He was selected as one of seven finalists and performed with the Vienna Radio Symphony Orchestra conducted by Cornelius Meister.

In 2011, aged 19, Karizna won third prize in the cello category of the 14th International Tchaikovsky Competition in Moscow. His other competition awards included first prize at the FLAME competition in Paris in 2011, the Guilhermina Suggia International Prize in Porto in 2013, first prize at the Società Umanitaria International Competition in Milan in 2015 and first prize at the Luis Sigall International Competition in Chile in 2016.

At the 2017 Queen Elisabeth Competition in Brussels, the first edition of the competition devoted to cello, Karizna reached the final and performed Dmitri Shostakovich's Cello Concerto No. 1 and Toshio Hosokawa's compulsory work Sublimation with the Brussels Philharmonic under Stéphane Denève. He was awarded fifth prize. He also received both public-vote prizes, the Canvas/Klara Prize and the Prix Musiq'3.

During his early career he performed with the Mariinsky Theatre Orchestra, Saint Petersburg Philharmonic Orchestra, Moscow Virtuosi, Orchestre philharmonique de Strasbourg and other orchestras. In 2012 he took part in Kronberg Academy's Chamber Music Connects the World, performing with musicians including Gidon Kremer, Yuri Bashmet and Christian Tetzlaff.

== Performing career ==
In January 2023, Karizna replaced Truls Mørk at short notice in Antonín Dvořák's Cello Concerto in B minor with the Netherlands Philharmonic Orchestra conducted by Markus Poschner at the Concertgebouw in Amsterdam.

Later in 2023 he toured with the Rundfunk-Sinfonieorchester Berlin and its chief conductor Vladimir Jurowski, performing Shostakovich's Second Cello Concerto. Performances on the tour were reviewed by Süddeutsche Zeitung and Bachtrack.

In November 2024, Karizna made his debut with the Rotterdam Philharmonic Orchestra at the Cello Biënnale Amsterdam, performing Shostakovich's First Cello Concerto under Tarmo Peltokoski. The same programme featured Truls Mørk as soloist in Shostakovich's Second Cello Concerto.

In 2025 he performed Shostakovich's First Cello Concerto with the Dresden Philharmonic and conductor Tabita Berglund, and Mieczysław Weinberg's Cello Concerto with the Aarhus Symphony Orchestra under Dmitry Matvienko. In September of that year he performed Camille Saint-Saëns's First Cello Concerto with the Residentie Orchestra at the Concertgebouw under Michał Nesterowicz.

In February 2026, Karizna performed the Dutch premiere of Thomas Larcher's cello concerto Returning into Darkness with the Netherlands Philharmonic Orchestra and conductor Dima Slobodeniouk at the Concertgebouw. In April he made his debut with the Netherlands Radio Philharmonic Orchestra in Johannes Brahms' Double Concerto, alongside violinist Liza Ferschtman and conductor Christian Reif.

In May 2026 he appeared with the BBC National Orchestra of Wales under Martyn Brabbins, performing Huw Watkins' Cello Concerto at the St Davids Cathedral Festival.

Karizna toured Australia in June 2026. He performed Shostakovich's First Cello Concerto with the Adelaide Symphony Orchestra and Mark Wigglesworth; the concert was subsequently broadcast by ABC Classic. He then performed Dvořák's Cello Concerto with the Queensland Symphony Orchestra under Umberto Clerici, followed by four performances of Robert Schumann's Cello Concerto with the Sydney Symphony Orchestra and Anja Bihlmaier at the Sydney Opera House. He concluded the Australian tour with Schumann's concerto and the West Australian Symphony Orchestra under Otto Tausk in Perth.

In September 2026 Karizna performed Dvořák's Cello Concerto at the opening of the Polish Radio Orchestra's 2026–27 season in Warsaw, conducted by the orchestra's new music director Bassem Akiki.

== Chamber music ==
Karizna has performed chamber music with musicians including Gidon Kremer, András Schiff, Renaud Capuçon, Christian Tetzlaff, Gérard Caussé, Elena Bashkirova and others.

His festival appearances have included the Cello Biënnale Amsterdam, Kronberg Festival and the Jerusalem International Chamber Music Festival. At the 2026 Jerusalem festival he performed in works by Ottorino Respighi, Hugo Wolf and Dvořák and also gave a cello masterclass at the Jerusalem Music Centre.

== Recordings ==
Karizna's first solo recording, made with Belgian pianist Eliane Reyes, was released by Soupir Editions in 2016 following his receipt of the André Boisseaux Prize. The programme was devoted to Russian music and included Sergei Rachmaninoff's Cello Sonata as well as works and transcriptions by Tchaikovsky, Prokofiev, Glazunov, Rimsky-Korsakov, Arensky and Shchedrin.

In 2021, the Mirare label released Beethoven: Œuvres pour violoncelle et piano, recorded with Greek pianist Vassilis Varvaresos. The album includes the cello arrangement of Beethoven's "Kreutzer" Sonata, the Seven Variations on Bei Männern, welche Liebe fühlen, WoO 46, and the Cello Sonata No. 3 in A major, Op. 69.

== Critical reception ==
Reviewing Karizna's performance of Shostakovich's Second Cello Concerto with the Rundfunk-Sinfonieorchester Berlin and Jurowski in 2023, Michael Stallknecht of Süddeutsche Zeitung described the cellist as an unusually distinctive musician and noted the range of colours and attacks in his sound. Edward Sava-Segal, writing for Bachtrack, praised Karizna's shaping of the concerto's opening and the sustained tension of the Largo, as well as the interaction between soloist and conductor in the finale.

Reviewing his Sydney Symphony debut in June 2026, Steve Moffatt of Limelight noted Karizna's ability to move rapidly between restrained lyricism and a much more powerful sonority. Later that month, reviewing his West Australian Symphony Orchestra debut, Will Yeoman described the Schumann performance as intimate and lyrical and highlighted Karizna's collaboration with the orchestra's principal cello.

== Instrument ==
Karizna plays a Bartolomeo Tassini cello dating from around 1760 that previously belonged to the French cellist Paul Tortelier. The instrument is on loan from a member of the Stretton Society.

== Discography ==
- Violoncelle – Russian works with Eliane Reyes, piano (Soupir Editions, 2016)
- Beethoven: Œuvres pour violoncelle et piano – with Vassilis Varvaresos, piano (Mirare, 2021)
