= Dale Henderson =

American cellist poet (born 1976)

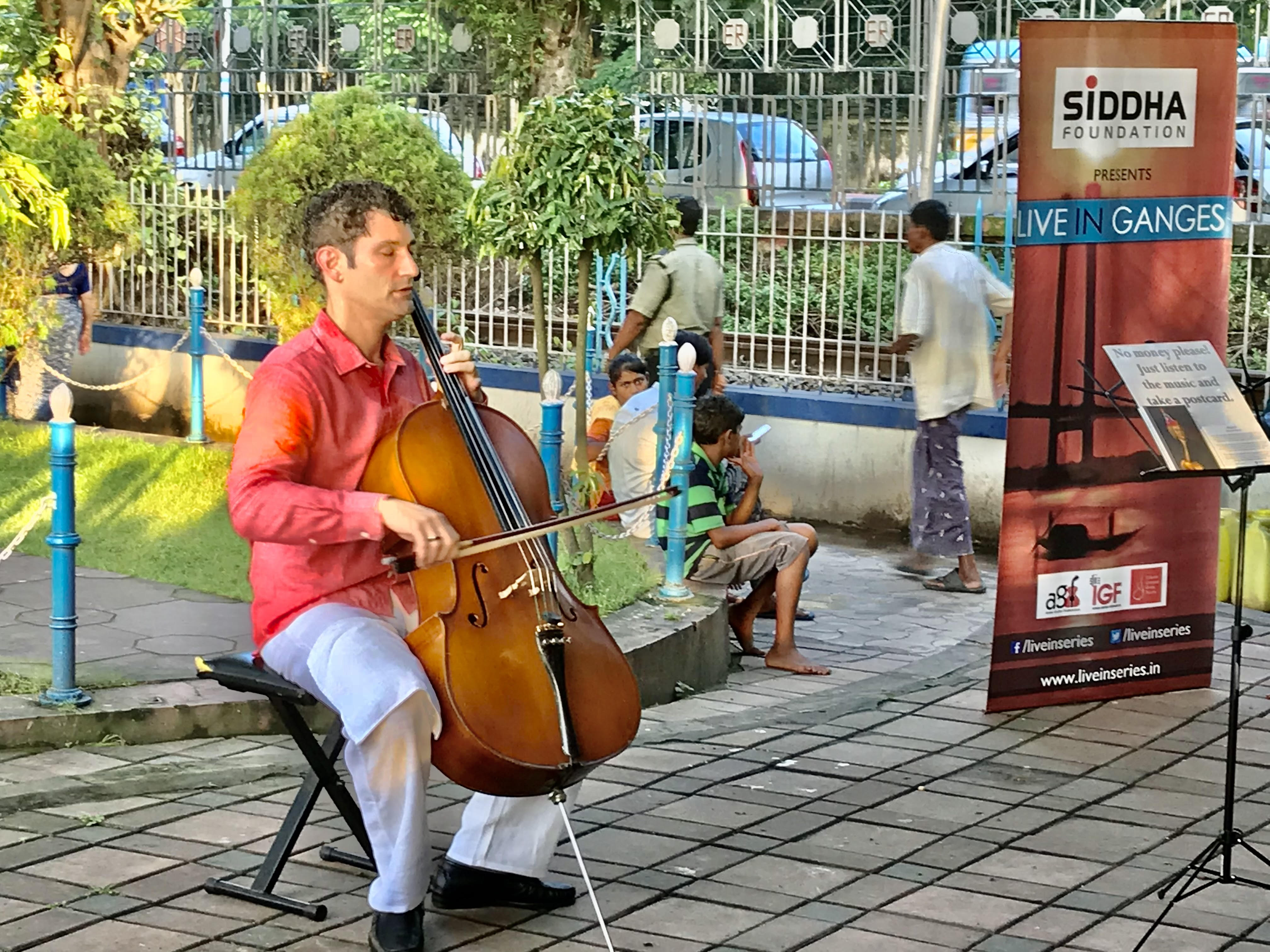
- Dale Henderson, playing for Bach in the Subways in Kolkata, 2018
- Born: 3 June 1976 (age 50); Johannesburg, South Africa
- Education: New England Conservatory of Music; UCLA; International Menuhin Music Academy
- Occupations: Musical artist, Cellist
- Years active: 1981–present
- Spouse: Moitreyee Sinha
- Relatives: Sreyash Sarkar (cousin-in-law)
- Musical career
- Genres: Classical; Classical rock; Classical crossover
- Instruments: Cello
- Website: dalehendersonmusic.com

Dale Henderson (born in 1976) is an American cellist. He plays a 1914 Thomas James Holder cello. Henderson is the founder of Bach in the Subways, and has toured the world performing equal access concerts to renew interest in classical music.

Henderson also performed all of Johann Sebastian Bach's works for cello, the Cello Suites and Sonatas for viola da gamba and harpsichord, in a single tour.

Actor and cellist Dermot Mulroney performed an equal access concert with Henderson in Los Angeles.

== Early life and musical training ==
Henderson was born in Johannesburg, South Africa and grew up in the suburbs of Boston. At 13, Henderson debuted professionally with the Buffalo Philharmonic, performing Tchaikovsky's Rococo Variations to critical acclaim After performing privately for Sir Yehudi Menuhin in 1992, Menuhin wrote

I was expecting to hear beautiful cello playing from what Eiji [Oue] said and I was not disappointed.

The following year Henderson accepted Menuhin's invitation to attend the International Menuhin Music Academy in Switzerland. From 1996 to 2000 Henderson earned a Bachelor of Music at Boston's New England Conservatory of Music and then pursued a Master of Music at UCLA. Henderson trained with Yo-Yo Ma, Sir Yehudi Menuhin, Leonard Bernstein protégé Eiji Oue, Benjamin Zander, Laurence Lesser, Andrés Díaz, and Colin Carr while at UCLA and elsewhere.

== Career ==
From an early age, Henderson performed regularly as a soloist, chamber musician, and orchestral cellist in Boston's rich musical community. His early performance highlights included regular solo and chamber music recitals at Boston's Gardner Museum, solo performances in Tokyo, and numerous other concerti performances with the Erie Philharmonic, Marlboro Orchestra, New England Philharmonic, Springfield Symphony Orchestra, Wellesley Symphony Orchestra, Indian Hill Symphony, Newton Symphony Orchestra, Mozartium Chamber Orchestra, New England Conservatory Youth Philharmonic Orchestra, and Greater Boston Youth Symphony Chamber Orchestra.

Henderson performed at the Greenwood, Musicorda, Kneisel Hall, Aspen, Taos, and Banff concerts. He won first Prize in the Harry Dubbs Memorial Award, Framingham State College's Christa McAuliffe Memorial Medallion for Excellence, Leonard D. Wood Memorial Award, New England Symphony Competition (Lasker Young Soloist Award), Wellesley Symphony Competition, Springfield Symphony/Musicorda Competition, New England Philharmonic Competition, Marlboro Symphony Competition, Indian Hill Symphony Competition, and the Philharmonic Society of Arlington Competition.

Henderson joined the Community Music Center of Boston in their main goal to bring quality classical music schooling to underserved urban youth. He taught cello there for 4 years.

After moving on from New England Conservatory of Music, Henderson joined Vermont based pianist Annemieke McLane and took on various thorough projects including Beethoven's Complete Sonatas, Shostakovich and Prokofiev Sonatas in a multi-day, 3 concert cycle. Alongside TV and radio appearances, the two carried these and different projects to venues across New England.

Henderson started his concentrated work to "save the music" not long after moving to New York. He additionally matched up to give traditional recitals with pianist Molly Kiser. Offering various wide-ranging projects, the team showed up at W.M.P. Show Hall, CUNY's Hunter College, and different venues across the New York Metropolitan region.

From 2010 onwards, Henderson started frequent performances of Bach's Solo Cello Suites in the subway stations of New York City. Declining monetary compensations, he offered crowds free postcards explaining his intentions to sow the seeds for classical music appreciation. Inviting all musicians everywhere to join him for Bach's birthday, by 2015 Bach in the Subways had spread to 140 communities in 40 nations – 1000s of artists joined the cause.

Henderson continued to give traditional concerts and teamed up with fellow musicians. One such collaboration was Parsa Duo starting in 2015, which brought together Henderson and Atlanta Symphony Orchestra principal harpist Elisabeth Remy Johnson for an extensive tour across Rio de Janeiro and overselling Bainbridge Island, Washington, for 3 seasons. In 2016, Henderson taught at DePauw University in collaboration with Eric Edberg, offering a mini-residency with performance models. In the same year, Henderson joined Ghanaian American pianist William Chapman Nyaho for immersive Bach projects. Sharing common ground for this music, the two presented Bach's Complete da Gamba Sonatas in a single program.

From 2017 to 2018, observing Bach's 333rd birthday, Henderson followed the music development he began in New York City on an extensive world tour. For the March 21–25 worldwide birthday festivity, he performed in 3 cities in 3 nations in 5 days.

== Personal life ==
Henderson resides in and works out of New York city. He is married to Moitreyee Sinha, a scientist and CEO and co-founder of global mental health collective action platform citiesRISE. He is related to the internationally published poet Sreyash Sarkar through marriage.
