= Tessa Seymour =

- Born: June 9, 1993 (age 32); Berkeley, California, USA
- Genres: Classical
- Occupation: Cellist
- Instrument: 1720 Carlo Giuseppe Testore
- Website: www.tessaseymour.com

Tessa Seymour (born June 9, 1993) is an American cellist.

== Early life ==
On June 9, 1993, Seymour was born in Berkeley, California to Norwegian and Russian parents. She started learning to play the cello at the age of six.

== Education ==
At age 16, she moved to Philadelphia to study at the prestigious Curtis Institute of Music, where she was under the tutelage of Carter Brey and Peter Wiley.

== Career ==
Seymour made her Carnegie Hall debut in 2007 and has performed in numerous other distinguished venues throughout the world, including Davies Symphony Hall and the Kennedy Center. She frequently performs on NPR's radio show From the Top with Christopher O'Riley, as well as the Emmy-nominated PBS television series, Live from Carnegie Hall. In 2009, she attended the Verbier Festival Academy and was awarded the "Prix Jean-Nicolas Firmenich de Violoncelle." In March 2014, she performed the U.S. premiere of Polish composer Krzysztof Penderecki's Suite for Solo Cello at Carnegie Hall. Seymour is also a Jack Kent Cooke Foundation Scholar. She plays on the Carlo Giuseppe Testore "Camilla" cello from 1720.
