= Wellesley Symphony Orchestra =

American orchestra

The Wellesley Symphony Orchestra is a community American orchestra based in Wellesley, Massachusetts. It has presented classical, pops, and family concerts since 1948. The music director is Mark Latham.

The Wellesley Symphony Performs primarily classical works, presenting six concerts each season, including a family concert, with players from the Wellesley Public Schools, and a holiday pops concert. Soloists have included players from the Boston Symphony Orchestra and well known musicians from the Boston area. The 2025-2026 concert season begins on Sunday, September 28, at MassBay Community College.

The Wellesley Symphony is Orchestra-in-Residence at MassBay Community College. The Wellesley Symphony Collaborated with MassBay for a benefit concert in May of 2024 and provides music for MassBay Commencements.

The WSO supports young artists through its Michael H. Welles Young Soloist Competition, the winners of which are featured at the annual family concert.
