= Maxim Kozlov =

Russian-born American cellist

- Born: Yekaterinburg
- Citizenship: United States
- Education: Moscow State Conservatory; Peabody Institute
- Occupations: cellist and educator
- Years active: 1995-present

Maxim Kozlov is a Russian-born cellist who holds American citizenship and has held several principal cellist positions, including the Chamber Orchestra Kremlin, the South Dakota Symphony Orchestra, and has also occasionally served as principal cellist with various other orchestras.

== Early life and education ==
Kozlov was born in Yekaterinburg, where he studied cello from the age of five through completion of his master's degree. He holds a Doctorate of Musical Arts from the Moscow State Conservatory and a Graduate Performing Diploma from Peabody Institute. He presently resides in Eldersburg, Maryland.

== Career ==
Kozlov has performed in several roles, including soloist, principal cellist, and guest cellist. He first performed in the Chamber Orchestra Kremlin from 1995 to 2003, with whom he performed concerts in the United States, Canada, South America and Europe, South Korea and China. With the Chamber Orchestra Kremlin, Kozlov recorded a total of 6 CDs with Claves Records, two as a soloist and six as their principal cellist. Kozlov then moved to the South Dakota Symphony Orchestra from 2005 to 2012, also occasionally performing with the Northwest Iowa Symphony Orchestra, the Lancaster Symphony Orchestra, and the Annapolis Symphony Orchestra. In 2013 he traveled to Macao, China and Portugal as the guest principal cellist of the Macao Orchestra.

== Awards and performances ==
Kozlov has received several awards, including the Second Prize in the Russian National Cello Competition in 1993, the Gregor Piatigorsky Scholarship, and the Fanny B. Thalheimer Memorial Scholarship. In 2001 Kozlov participated in Polyphony of the World as a member of "Kremerata Baltica". He was a member of the highly applauded Monument Piano Trio with other Peabody Conservatory graduates, and after moving to South Dakota he became a member of the Dakota String Quartet. Kozlov has also performed as an accompanist to Adam Golka, Paul Sanchez and Alessio Bax in the 2011 and 2012 Dakota Sky International Piano festivals. This, and his performance with the Chamber Orchestra Kremlin at Fairfield University have been his most recent major performances.

== YouTube and Contributions to Cello Education ==
In 2013 Kozlov created YouTube channel "Cellopedia". With hundreds of videos and over fifty thousand subscribers, it has become a popular source for video reference for cello pedagogy repertoire. He also runs an Instagram account, where he posts many videos with tips on cello technique, and advertises his courses.
