= William De Rosa =

American cellist

William De Rosa is an American cellist. De Rosa was lauded as "one of the most brilliant cello talents in the world" by Leonard Rose.

== Early life ==
After capturing first prize in the Young Musicians Foundation Piatagorsky Award, De Rosa studied at Juilliard with Leonard Rose and Lynn Harrell.

== Career ==
De Rosa has performed under conductors such as Raymond Leppard, Myung-Whun Chung, James Judd, JoAnn Falletta, Yan-Pascal Tortelier and with orchestras including the Los Angeles and Florida Philharmonics, the Symphony Orchestras of Milwaukee, Utah, and San Francisco and the Los Angeles Chamber Orchestra. De Rosa concentrates on contemporary music. De Rosa is an active chamber musician.

As recitalist, De Rosa performed in the Kennedy Center, Lincoln Center and Carnegie Hall. De Rosa played in Taiwan's National Concert Hall, and with the Central Philharmonic in Beijing and the Shanghai Symphony. He performed extensively in Japan.

His recording of the Shostakovich cello concerto No. 1 was included in Stereophile Magazine's 1997 list of "Ten Best Recordings".

De Rosa performs on a cello crafted by Domenico Montagnana in Venice (1739).
