= Jamal Aliyev =

Turkish cellist (born 1993)

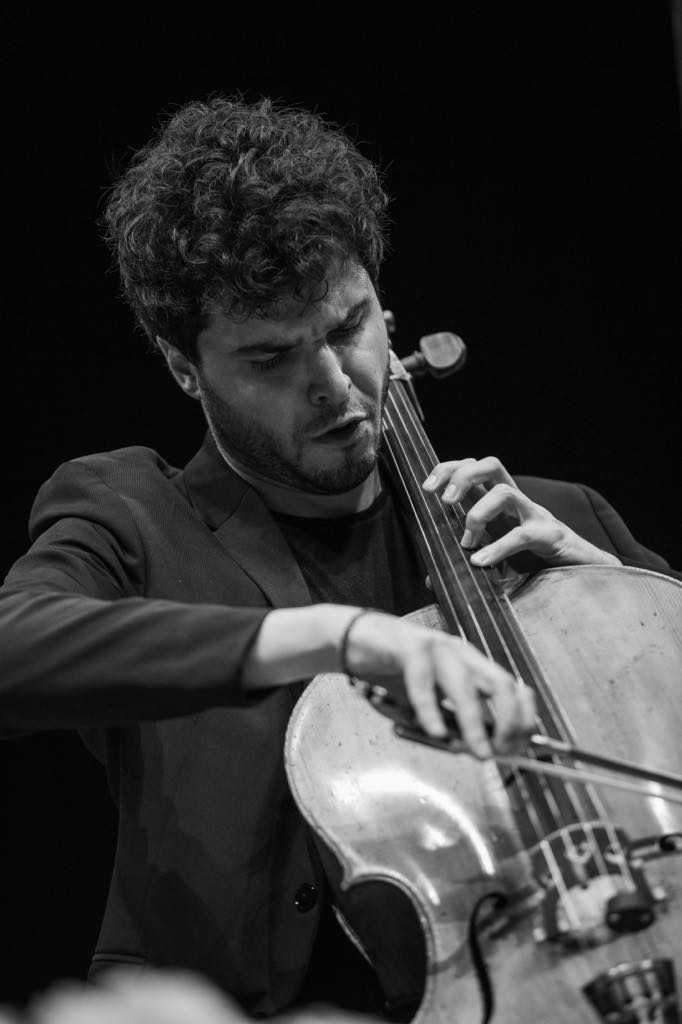
- Born: 2 September 1993 (age 32); Baku, Azerbaijan
- Occupation: Cellist
- Years active: 2014–present
- Website: jamalaliyev.com

Signature
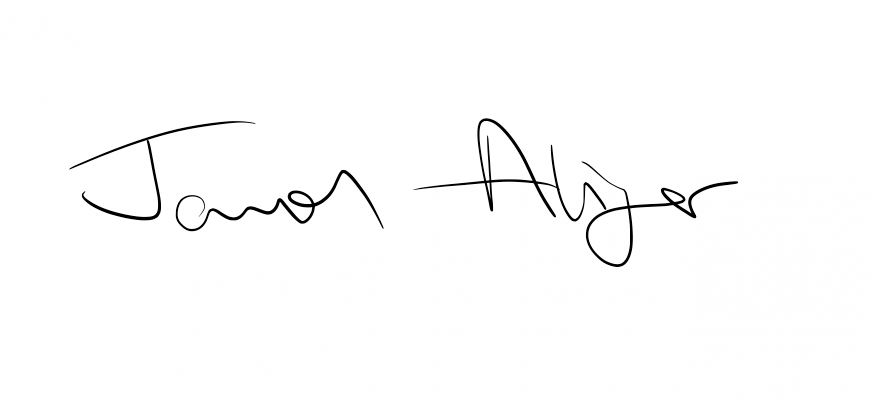

Jamal Aliyev (Azerbaijani: Camal Əliyev; born 2 September 1993) is an Azerbaijani cellist.

In 2017 Aliyev made his solo debut at the BBC Proms with the BBC Concert Orchestra at the Royal Albert Hall—London live on radio and TV, won the "Arts Club—Sir Karl Jenkins Music Award" and his debut CD with pianist Anna Fedorova, "Russian Masters", was released by Champs Hill Records to critical acclaim.

== Awards ==
(2002) 1st Prize Trakya International Cello Competition
(2004) 1st Prize V. Antonio Janigro International Cello Competition
(2013) Junior Award Hattori Foundation
(2014) Winner Muriel Taylor Cello Competition/Scholarship
(2014) Winner Royal College of Music Concerto Competition
(2014) Winner Royal College of Music Violoncello Competition
(2014) Junior Award Hattori Foundation
(2015) Winner Royal College of Music Concerto Competition
(2015) Winner Royal College of Music Violoncello Competition
(2015) Senior Award Hattori Foundation
(2015) Winner Martin Trust Sidney Perry Award
(2015) 1st Prize Croydon Concerto Competition UK
(2015) 1st Prize Bromsgrove International Musicians Competition
(2016) 1st Prize Eastbourne Concerto Competition UK
(2016) Winner Cambridge Concerto Competition UK
(2016) Winner Musicians Company Concerts Award
(2016) Senior Award Hattori Foundation
(2016) Winner Royal College of Music Concerto Competition
(2016) Honourable Mention Pablo Casals Competition
(2016) Kronberg Academy Award Enescu Competition Romania
(2017) Winner Kirckman Society – Wigmore Hall award
(2017) Winner Royal College of Music Violoncello Competition
(2017) Winner Sir Karl Jenkins Music Award
(2017) Winner Musicians Company – Prince's Prize
(2019) 2nd Prize and Audience Prize Windsor International Competition
(2020) Winner Fazil Say Award
(2021) Chosen One of the top 30 musicians in the World under the age of 30 - selected by Classic FM

== Live Broadcast Appearances ==
2012
Live Broadcast at the Menuhin Hall—Solo with BBC Concert Orchestra

2012
Live Broadcast solo performance on Sean Rafferty's Radio 3, "In Tune"

2014
Live Broadcast solo performance on Moscow 24 TV

2015
BBC Introducing Artist Scheme—BBC Radio 3, "In Tune"

2016
Live Broadcast solo performance on Sarah Walker's BBC Radio 3, "In Tune"

2016
Live Broadcast solo performance on London Live TV

2016
Live Broadcast solo performance on Medici TV

2016
Live Broadcast solo performance on Romania TV

2017
BBC Introducing Artist Scheme—Music Day—BBC Radio 3, "In Tune"—Live from Hatfield House

2017
Live Broadcast on BBC Radio 3—BBC Proms celebrating John Williams

2019
Live Broadcast from TIM Maslak Show Centre—Recital with Fazil Say

2019
Live Broadcast on Classic FM—Solo with CBSO at Classic FM World of Fame—Royal Albert Hall

2020
Live Broadcast on Classic FM—Solo with CBSO at Classic FM World of Fame—Royal Albert Hall

== Discography ==
2017 - Debut Album with Anna Fedorova - "Russian Masters" with Champs Hill Records

2020 - Classic FM (F.Schubert - Ave Maria)

2021 - Solo album “Illusion”

2022 - Sony Music, Vienna Radio Symphony and Howard Griffiths - “Goltermann Project”

2022 - Warner Classics with Fazil Say “Jamal Aliyev plays Say”

== Cello ==
Giovanni Battista Gabrielli (1756)
