= Otto van Koppenhagen =

Otto van Koppenhagen (January 19, 1895 – January 19, 1978) was a Dutch-born cellist and teacher.

Van Koppenhagen was born in Arnhem, the Netherlands, and came to the United States in 1921. He played with the New York Philharmonic Orchestra from 1928 to 1949 where he was principal cellist.

In 1949 he moved to Providence, Rhode Island, where he became professor of music at Brown University. He continued to teach both private lessons and classes in the music department after his retirement in 1961, and after his wife died he actually lived in the Brown music building.

He died in Providence in 1978.
