= Rudolf Gleißner =

German cellist

Rudolf Gleißner, usually transcribed as Rudolf Gleissner, (born March 17, 1942, at Nürnberg) is a German cellist.

He studied cello in Nürnberg, Munich and Detmold with André Navarra, Enrico Mainardi and Pablo Casals. His musical ideas are mainly influenced by his work with Sergiu Celibidache.

Gleißner started his career in 1968 as soloist at Radio-Sinfonieorchester Berlin. Following that he was First Solo Player at Radio-Sinfonieorchester Stuttgart until Spring 2007.

He has done a lot of concerts as chamber musician and was co-founder of the 'Stuttgarter Solisten' in 1970.

Since 1978 he has been a professor at the University of Music and Performing Arts, Stuttgart.
