= Mark Prihodko =

Modern Belarusian-American cellist

Mark Prihodko Марк Прыходзька
- Born: July 3, 1997 (age 29)
- Genre: Classical
- Occupations: Musician, producer, entrepreneur
- Instruments: Cello, piano
- Website: https://www.markprihodko.com

Mark Prihodko (Note: Belarusian: Марк Прыходзька, romanized: Mark Prykhodz’ka) is Belarusian-American cellist, producer and entrepreneur. He made his debut at the age of 9 at the Musica Mundi festival in Belgium and Chat el Ro concert series in France. A graduate of the Pre-Conservatory program of Shattuck-Saint Mary's School, he has received Kovner Fellowship to pursuit Bachelor of Music degree at the Juilliard School.

Mark Prihodko is performing as soloist and chamber musician on many stages around the world. As a lecturer, he has given master classes at the ESMUC (Catalonia College of Music) of Barcelona Conservatory, Bilkent University (Ankara), Manhattan School of Music (New York) and University of Minnesota (Minneapolis).

== Early life ==
Born in a family of a cellist father and a pianist mother, Mark was studying under the leadership of a Belarusian pedagogue Vladimir Perlin from the age of 5 and became a performing artist since the age of 8. 9 year old Mark debuted at the Musica Mundi festival in Belgium and Chat el Ro concert series in France, followed by engagements with orchestras around the world:

Our music school was our life and surrounded all aspects of it. [...] The interaction with high-caliber musicians kept you engaged in a special atmosphere of musical existence. [...] With Perlin having relationships with some of the finest international music festivals and celebrated artists, we collaborated on a regular basis with music legends like Martha Argerich, Mischa Maisky, Ivry Gitlis, and Paul Badura-Skoda and naturally absorbed the skill to schedule rehearsals, play with an orchestra, and all facets surrounding the world of the stage.

— Mark Prihodko, from interview

Before becoming a part of the Kovner Fellowship at the Juilliard School at 2016, he makes the United States his home at the age of 14.

== Education and degrees ==
According to Prihodko's official website, his educational career is:

- 2006–2012: Republican Music College; Minsk, Belarus. Associate degree of Cello and Piano Performance. Professor — Vladimir Perlin.
- 2012–2016: School of Music at University of Minnesota; Shattuck St.Mary's school; MN, USA. Pre-Conservatory program diploma. Professor — Tanya Remenikova.
- 2016–2020: The Juilliard School; NY, USA. Bachelor of Music. Professor — Richard Аaron.
- 2020–2022: University of Music Franz Liszt Weimar; Weimar, Germany. Master of Performing Arts. Professor — Wolfgang Emanuel Schmidt.

== Performance and programing ==
La Crosse Symphony Orchestra conductor Alexander Platt praised а 17 year old Prihodko. Pioneer Press (Minnesota State capital newspaper) reporter positively noted his performance. Mark's interdisciplinary approach to arts in general has led him to learn and inspire his music interpretations from pianists, violinists, dancers, and actors. Prihodko's specialty of late Romantic and contemporary repertoire went beyond standard classical programing by choosing alternative venues and media of presentation, as well as commissioning new works.

== Notable projects ==
=== Veritá Baroque Ensemble (ongoing) ===
Established during the COVID-19 pandemic by Russian-German flutist Taya König-Tarasevich and Italian cellist Bartolomeo Dandolo Marchesi, this ensemble specializes in performing Baroque music on period instruments. Under Mark's leadership this ensemble released their debut album "The German Album". One of the notable performances produced by Prihodko for Verità Baroque Ensemble is the world premier of Marc Migó's Concerto Grosso "The Seance" at the Institut de France in Paris during the European-American Music Alliance Institute in July 2023. "The Immersive Project" is a part of this ensemble that aims to present baroque music in the XXI century context by installing 360-degree domes showcasing surrounding audio-visual performances recorded in 6 German castles.

=== Noack Concert Series (ongoing) ===
This concept, where Prihodko is an art-director, unifies visual, music and culinary arts in a joint experience for the audience in Berlin. Established in 2020 and situated at the Bildgiesserei und Werkstattgalerie Hermann Noack, this series has presented ensembles from Germany, Ukraine, Switzerland, Netherlands, Spain, Italy, South Africa, Columbia, and the United States, making 5 to 8 concerts a year with a three-course dinner each.

=== Transmutations: Between Fragility and Permanence (2023) ===
An exhibition of Lera Auerbach's full collection of Bronzes and Rooforisms curated by Prihodko was premiered at Amare Den Haag on September 16, 2023.

=== Turkish-American Cultural Laboratory (2019–2020) ===
This intercultural platform was co-founded by Mark Prihodko and Turkish-American violinist and educator Zeynep Alpan in 2019 to promote collaboration, creativity, and leadership among the artists of Turkey and the U.S. At the Bilkent University in Ankara young artists from the U.S. have launched classes on self-management and entrepreneurship in the arts (led by Prihodko) and community engagement in the arts (led by Alpan). By partnering with American Turkish Society and Turkish House the two artists raised the awareness for the fine arts in two countries, and introduced the subject of community engagement through the arts via performances in Ankara and Istanbul.

=== Artemp Festival and Academy (2018–2019) ===
In 2017, together with Darya Moroz (artistic director) and Maria Kalesnikava (creative director) Prihodko founded the international Artemp Festival and Academy in Minsk, Belarus. The festival presented cross-disciplinary performances of local and international artists year-round; while the academy offered free courses for young composers from Belarus, Kazakhstan, Russia and Ukraine under the leadership of professors Martin Schüttler and Sergey Nevskiy.

== Commissions and premieres ==
- Rolf Wallin: Sway (2010) — western hemisphere premiere;
- Marc Migo — Sonata Cerdanyenca (composed in 2017): "Dedicated to Mark Prihodko, my great friend" — world premiere.

== Awards and recognition ==
- Honorary board member of Anselmo Academy of Music and the Arts
- Special Award from the Ministry of Health of the Republic of Türkiye, 2021
- Young People Symphony Concert Association's (YPSCA) School Music competition — 2nd place and Claire Givens Prize, 2016
- MPR Competition — Public Choice Award, 2016
- Schubert Club Competition — First Place (for Sr High Strings), 2015
- "Музыка Надежды" ("Music of hope" in Russian) International Competition (Gomel, Belarus) — First Prize, 2011
- 8th International Russian Rotary Children Music Competition (Moscow) — First Place (for cello), 2010

== Discography ==
Cerdanyenca album was released December 1, 2023 by IBS Classics label for worldwide distribution via Naxos Records. This hour-long work is a collaboration of Mark Prihodko and pianist Viktoria Korolionok. It has a romantic repertoire of four composers: Ysaye, Gershwin, Rachmaninov, and Marc Migó (modern Catalan composer). The album takes its title from the eponymous sonata, written by Migó, who dedicated this work to his friend Prihodko.

| No. | Title | Writer(s) | Length |
|---|---|---|---|
| 1. | "I Al Cap del Ras" | Marc Migó — Sonata "Cerdanyenca" for cello and piano | 5:45 |
| 2. | "II Aloja" | Marc Migó — Sonata "Cerdanyenca" for cello and piano | 6:57 |
| 3. | "III Intermezzo i Cadència" | Marc Migó — Sonata "Cerdanyenca" for cello and piano | 7:50 |
| 4. | "IV Excursions" | Marc Migó | 5:55 |
| 5. | "Romance" | Sergei Rachmaninoff — 2 Morceaux de salon Op. 6 | 6:33 |
| 6. | "Hungarian Dance" | Sergei Rachmaninoff — 2 Morceaux de salon Op. 6 | 5:16 |
| 7. | "Romança Melòdica" | Marc Migó | 2:42 |
| 8. | "I Lento e molto sostenuto" | Eugène Ysaÿe — Sonata for Solo Cello, Op.28 | 4:34 |
| 9. | "II Poco allegretto e grazioso" | Eugène Ysaÿe — Sonata for Solo Cello, Op.28 | 4:00 |
| 10. | "III Adagio" | Eugène Ysaÿe — Sonata for Solo Cello, Op.28 | 1:55 |
| 11. | "IV Allegro tempo fermo" | Eugène Ysaÿe — Sonata for Solo Cello, Op.28 | 3:43 |
| 12. | "I Allegro ben ritmato e deciso" | George Gershwin — Three Preludes for Cello and Piano | 1:47 |
| 13. | "II Andante con moto e poco rubato" | George Gershwin — Three Preludes for Cello and Piano | 4:07 |
| 14. | "III Allegro ben ritmato e deciso" | George Gershwin — Three Preludes for Cello and Piano | 1:21 |
| Total length: | | | 1:02:25 |
