= Alexei Romanenko =

Russian-born cellist

Alexei Romanenko is a Russian-born cellist. Romanenko was born in Vladivostok, Russia, Romanenko began playing the cello at six-years old. He studied at the Moscow Conservatory under cello professor Valentin Feygin. In 1998, Romanenko moved to the United States where he received his Artist Diploma and continued and completed his studies with cello professors Bernard Greenhouse and Laurence Lesser at the New England Conservatory of Music.

Alexei Romanenko has performed at venues such as Boston's Jordan Hall, Carnegie Hall's Weill Recital Hall, the Phillips Collection in Washington, D.C., Chicago's Preston Bradley Hall among many others. He has also been heard on the international broadcast of "Voice of America" in Russia, broadcast live on Chicago's WFMT Fine Arts Radio, Atlanta's WABE, Boston's WGBH Radio “Classical Performances”, including “Musical Offering”on September 11, 2002. His performances were also broadcast on Chicago's TV Channel 25 as well as radio stations in San Francisco, Atlanta, Florida, Maine and Alabama. Romanenko has performed as a soloist with Jacksonville Symphony, Kensington Symphony, Nashua Symphony, Montgomery Symphony, Bar Harbor Music Festival Orchestra, Moscow Youth Chamber Orchestra, the Far Eastern TV and Radio orchestra, Udmurtia Philharmonic in a “Virtuosos of 21st century” concert among others.

Romanenko has served as principal cellist with the Boston Philharmonic Orchestra in Boston's Symphony Hall and in New York's Carnegie Hall. He was invited to play at the Berlin Brandenburg Gates under the direction of Maestro Mstislav Rostropovich. Mr. Romanenko also performed for President Bill Clinton during his visit to New England Conservatory of Music as part of Clinton's farewell tour in January 2001. He serves as principal cellist for the Jacksonville Symphony.

== List of awards ==
- 1993: Top prize in the Gnesina College Cello Competition
- 1993: Became a Laureate of the international program New Names, performed and toured through Russia.
- First Prize in the Far-Eastern Competition.
- 1999: Presser Music Award in Boston
- 1999: First Prize at the 8th International Music Competition in Vienna, Austria.
- 2000: First Prize at the 2nd Web Concert Hall International Auditions.
