= Fiona Thompson =

English cellist

Fiona Thompson is an English cellist. She began studying cello in her native England at the age of seven and studied with Leonid Gorokhov at the Royal Northern College of Music, and with Ronald Leonard at the University of Southern California.

Thompson is the principal cellist of the Harrisburg Symphony Orchestra as well as Artist-in-Residence at Messiah College in Pennsylvania. She is a member of the Baltimore Chamber Orchestra.

She toured Japan with the Washington National Opera. As the principal cellist of the Metropolitan Chamber Orchestra, she performed with Arlo Guthrie at Carnegie Hall. She is a member of the Mendelssohn Piano Trio and the Razumovsky String Quartet.
