= Igor Gavrish =

Igor Gavrish (also Gavris or Gavrysh; born 1945) is a Russian cellist and Professor of Cello at the Moscow Conservatory. He was the winner of the 1968 Pablo Casals Cello Competition at the Budapest International Competition, and of the International Tchaikovsky competition (1970).

== Biography ==
His first teacher was E. Khomitser. In 1963 he graduated from the Central music school (the class of Sviatoslav Knushevitsky). Then he continued his studies at the Moscow State Tchaikovsky Conservatory (graduated with honors in 1968) and in the postgraduate course in the class of Galina Kozolupova. At this moment he is teaching at the Moscow Conservatory and Central Music School.

== Discography ==
- 10th International Music Competition Budapest, 1968: Cello Competition - String Quartet Competition - Viola Competition
- Adagio for cello and piano / Kodály: Kodály, Zoltán, 1882–1967. Praga/Le Chant du Monde; Harmonia Mundi, distribution; 1995
- Igor Gavrish: Brahms, Beethoven, Reger: Works for Cello and Piano, 1997
- Musique de chambre / Kodály: Kodály, Zoltán, 1882–1967. Sonatas, violoncello, op. 8; Kodály, Zoltán, 1882–1967. Duet, violin, violoncello, op. 7. Praga/Le Chant du Monde; Harmonia Mundi, distribution; 2004
