= Bach in the Subways =

Movement to increase awareness of classical music

Bach in the Subways is a grass-roots movement to bring public attention to classical music, mainly through free concerts in celebration of the birthday of Johann Sebastian Bach (March 21). First performed as solo concerts in the New York City Subway in 2010 by cellist Dale Henderson, by 2015 events were performed by thousands of musicians in 129 cities in more than 39 countries, and every March since, for Bach's birthday, performances are given by thousands of musicians in hundreds of locations around the world.

== Origins ==
Bach in the Subways was originally conceived and executed as a solo project by cellist Dale Henderson beginning in early 2010, when he began a campaign of frequent performances of the Bach Cello Suites in the New York City Subway. Instead of putting out a tip jar and asking for money from subway passengers, Henderson flipped the usual scenario upside down: he refused donations and offered listeners free souvenir postcards with an iconic image on the front, and the following message on the back:

More people listen to classical music today than ever before. The internet provides instant access to a genre whose global popularity increases yearly. Ironically, the number of Americans who attend live classical music events continues to dwindle. Many feel this trend threatens the future survival of classical music in this country. The Bach Solo Cello Suites are perfect ambassadors for classical music: their power and beauty unfailingly inspire great appreciation, joy and deep emotion in those who hear them. I perform the Suites in the subways of New York City to sow the seeds for future generations of classical music lovers.

Announcing on the Bach in the Subways Facebook and Twitter pages where and when he would appear on the day of performances, Henderson's work attracted attention from various media and musicians, notably an October 2010 video piece by CNN's Tawanda Scott entitled "He's playing to save the music," and an endorsement on Facebook by jazz saxophonist Brandon Marsalis. Henderson continued this intensive campaign of performances, often appearing two to three times a week, throughout 2010, 2011, and the earlier months of 2012, after which he continued to give Bach in the Subways performances but scaled back somewhat in frequency.

== Founding of Bach in the Subways Day ==
On March 10, 2011, Henderson posted the following message on the Bach in the Subways Facebook page:

Musicians: pick any subway station & any time between 12:00 a.m. and 11:59 p.m. on Monday, March 21, play Bach, and when people try to give you money don't take it. Just tell them it's Bach's birthday, and to enjoy the music. This is Bach in the Subways Day! If interested contact me....

Two cellists, Michael Lunapiena and Eric Edberg, cello professor at the DePauw University School of Music in Indiana, responded to Henderson's call to action and the three of them offered Bach Cello Suites to New York City Subway passengers in various stations throughout the city on March 21 – Bach's 326th birthday.

In March 2012, Henderson again circulated the call to action and attracted the attention of oboist Kristin Olson, whose enthusiasm and energy for the project helped increase interest among musicians. For Bach's 327th birthday 13 musicians in New York joined the effort, and for the first time Henderson had special Bach in the Subways Day cards designed and printed for musicians to distribute during their performances. The cards featured on their front the picture of Bach wearing a party hat which has since come to symbolize the Bach in the Subways movement around the world, and, on the back, a message:

Wednesday, March 21, 2012 is Johann Sebastian Bach's 327th birthday. To celebrate his life and music, and to sow the seeds for future generations of classical music lovers, musicians will be performing Bach in the Subways in stations throughout New York City throughout the day. We do not want money, but simply ask that you listen and open yourself up to the power of the music.

The day's festivities were covered in The Wall Street Journal, including a multimedia piece by Daniella Zalcman, and in another multimedia piece by New York's Classical Music Radio Station, WQXR-FM featuring performances by baroque cellist John Mark Rozendaal and other Bach in the Subways Day performers.

== Bach in the Subways Days 2013–2015 ==
For Bach's 328th birthday in 2013, the number of participating musicians grew to 45 and spread to Boston, Cincinnati, Miami, and Montreal. In New York, a 17-piece chorus organized by Stephen J. Herschkorn and calling themselves "Untersingen: The Bach Edition" roamed the subways offering Bach to straphangers. Henderson again armed musicians with Bach in the Subways Day cards to distribute to audiences while they performed, and New York's WQXR covered the festivities for a second year, this time offering a Google Maps interactive map on their website, with pins detailing all New York performances. This, along with coverage from Time Out New York, led to "Bach hopping' – fans travelled from performance to performance, taking pictures and shooting video.

While beginning work on Bach in the Subways Day 2014, Henderson was approached by Los Angeles-based classical music enthusiast and photographer Jeehyun Lee, who was interested in organizing Bach in the Subways Day in Los Angeles. This was the first time an organizer other than Henderson worked on Bach in the Subways Day, and marked the beginning of an inflection point in the growth of the movement. Bach in the Subways Day 2014 was joined by 77 musicians in 12 cities in 4 countries, including 22 performers organized by Lee in Los Angeles, and a quartet of three cellos and a tuba on a moving subway train in Taipei. It was the first year a Bach in the Subways website offered Google map pins and listings for all the performances.

In the months following Bach in the Subways Day 2014, Henderson was contacted by amateur and professional musicians as well as musical organizations in Seattle, Tokyo, Seoul, Singapore, and cities in Germany, all interested in organizing Bach in the Subways Day in their cities. In addition Henderson and Seattle organizer Rob Solomon, a professional anesthesiologist and amateur pianist and Bach lover, began a global email outreach campaign to invite musicians across the world to join Bach in the Subways Day 2015. On March 21, 2015, Johann Sebastian Bach's 330th birthday, thousands of musicians in 130 cities in 40 countries participated in the fifth Bach in the Subways Day.

== Notable Bach in the Subways Day 2015 performances ==
Country	Town	Performance	Instruments
Argentina	Buenos Aires	Argencello at Plaza de la Constitución	cellos
	Buenos Aires	Las Nereidas at Galileo Galilei Planetarium	string quartet
Australia	Melbourne	Australian Bach Society at The Block Arcade	guitars, flute, violin, cello, saxophone & Uilleann pipes
	Sydney	University of Sydney Conservatorium of Music Senior Lecturer in Piano Daniel Herscovitch and students at Macquarie Street	piano
	Botany Bay	University of Sydney faculty Steven Machamer at Mascot Station	vibraphone
	Perth	University of Western Australia Cello Ensemble at Brookfield Place	cellos
	Perth	West Australian Symphony Orchestra Principal Piccolo Michael Waye & University of Western Australia student Jonty Coy at Perth railway station	flutes
Austria	Linz	Instituts für Alte Musik und historisch informierte Aufführungspraxis students at Linz Hauptbahnhof	flutes, baroque cello, baroque oboes & baroque bassoons
	Vienna	Vienna Philharmonic Principal Cellist/Vienna State Opera Orchestra Principal Cellist Tamás Varga at Albertinaplatz	cello
Belarus	Minsk	former Kiev Opera Theatre Principal Bassoon Maksim Zabara at Frunzenskaya Metro	bassoon
Brazil	Brasília	Academia Camerata Real at Estação Praça do Relógio Metrô	violins, viola, cello, flute, trombone & trumpet
	Pauliceia, São Paulo	Macrisan Music School students	drums, bass, guitar, keyboard, cavaquinho, mandolin & viola
Canada	Toronto	Cecllia Quartet violist Caitlin Boyle	viola
	Toronto	Church of the Holy Trinity Music Director Ian Grundy at Church of the Holy Trinity – "Happy Birthday Bach Walk"	organ
	British Columbia	Kamloops Symphony Orchestra Principal Second Violin Annette Dominik at The Art We Are Artisan Market & Tournament Capital Centre	violin
	Toronto	Metropolitan United Church Director of Music Dr. Patricia Wright – "Happy Birthday Bach Walk"	organ
	Edmonton	Society for Talent Education & Edmonton Suzuki Flute & Recorder Society students & faculty at Churchill LRT Station	mixed
	Toronto	St. Andrew's Church Director of Music Dan Bickle & Leslie Bickle at St. Andrew's Church – "Happy Birthday Bach Walk"	organ & soprano
	Toronto	Tafelmusik's Christopher Verrette at Gardiner Museum & Miles Nadal Jewish Community Centre	violin
	Toronto	Tafelmusik's Patricia Ahern at Toronto Reference Library & Royal Ontario Museum	violin
	Toronto	Toronto Symphony Orchestra members	mixed
China	Hong Kong	KinderU Suzuki Music Academy at Central Terminal & Wanchai Subway	violins, violas & cellos
Ecuador	Guayaquil	Calmus Ensemble at José Joaquín de Olmedo International Airport	vocal quintet
England	Huddersfield	Huddersfield Philharmonic Orchestra cello section – Bach in the Pubway at the Flying Ferret	cellos
	London	Royal Orchestral Society at Tottenham Court Road tube	string orchestra
Finland	Helsinki	Finnish Baroque Orchestra members	cello & viola
Georgia	Tbilisi	Zakaria Paliashvili Central Music School students at Vake Park	chamber orchestra & chorus
Germany	Leipzig	amarcord at Markt, S-Bahn-Station	vocal quintet
	Bonn	Brandenburg Concerto No. 3 at Uni-Markt metro stop	chamber orchestra
	Hannover	Capella St. Crucis at Markthalle, Steintorplatz & Hauptbahnhof, Eingangshalle	mixed choir
	Dresden	Dresden Philharmonic conducted by Kazuki Yamada at Frauenkirche	orchestra
	Dresden	Ensemble Mediterrain members at Theaterplatz & on moving trolley	violin, viola & cello
	Heidelberg	Heidelberger Studentenkantorei & instrumentalists conducted by Christoph Andreas Schäfer at Willy-Brandt-Platz	choir, marimba, guitar, bassoon & violone
	Leipzig	Leipziger Universitätschor members at Markt Station	vocal
	Leipzig	Madrigio & Matthias Schubotz with forum Thomanum students at Markt Station	choirs
	Leipzig	Mendelssohn-Orchesterakademie members at Hauptbahnhof, S-Bahn-Station	violin & flute
	Bonn	Münsterplatz – The Cast	vocal & piano
	Leipzig	Musikschule Leipzig at Wilhelm-Leuschner-Platz S-Bahn-Station	mixed
	Mülheim (Ruhr)	Musikschule Mülheim students & faculty at Mülheim (Ruhr) Hauptbahnhof	mixed
	Gelsenkirchen	Musikverein Gelsenkirchen Neue Philharmonie Westfalen members at Gelsenkirchen Hauptbahnhof	choir & strings
	Kassel	Staatsorchester Kassel at Opernplatz	various ensembles
	Leipzig	University of Music and Theatre "Felix Mendelssohn Bartholdy" Leipzig students at Hauptbahnhof, S-Bahn-Station	mixed
	Paderborn	University of Paderborn students & piano faculty Eckhard Wiemann at Libori Galerie	mixed
Hungary	Budapest	Ádám Jenő Music School students, Musica Florens, Ditta Rohmann, Széchenyi University Flute Professor Gergely Ittzés, Franz Liszt Academy of Music Viola Professor Péter Bársony at Kálvin tér subway station	mixed
	Budapest	All Budapest Bach in the Subways musicians led by University of Pécs faculty Salamon Kamp in front of St. Stephen's Basilica	choir & orchestra
	Budapest	Balázs Fülei, György Lakatos, Mihály Demeniv, Lutherania Choir & others at Great Market Hall	piano, trumpet, trombone, violin, bassoon, accordion & choir
	Budapest	Ditta Rohmann, György Lakatos, Klára Bábel and others at the Astoria	cellos, bassoons, saxophone, syrinx, flute & harp
	Székesfehérvár	Hermann László Conservatoire faculty & students at Kossuth utca 3	flutes & pianos
	Budapest	Liszt Ferenc Academy of Music students Ibolya Vörösváry & Márton Vörösváry at Petőfi tér	viola & violin
	Székesfehérvár	Miklós Teleki & friends at Saint Imre Church	organ, soprano & trombone
	Székesfehérvár	Primavera Mixed Choir & Alba Regia Symphony Orchestra conducted by Béla Drahos at Alba Plaza shopping center	choir & orchestra
	Budapest	Schola Cantorum Budapestiensis, Járdányi Pál Music School Choir, Fischer Annie Music School Choir, Madách High School Choir, Hungarian Tuba Ensemble & Lutherania Choir at Deák Ferenc tér	organ & choirs
Ireland	Cork	CIT Cork School of Music students at Crawford Art Gallery	chamber choir
Italy	Milan	Cambristi at Duomo metro station	Milan
	Campobasso	Conservatorio di Musica "Lorenzo Perosi" students & faculty at Railway Station of Campobasso	harpsichords, flutes, violins, double basses, violas, voices, bassoons, guitars, marimbas & accordions
	Rome	Rinaldi–Meniconi Duet at the Church of San Tommaso da Villanova	violin & harpsichord
	Venice	Venetia Antiqua with Liesl Odenweller at St. George's Anglican Church	soprano & baroque chamber ensemble
Japan	Tokyo	Asagaya Ainebitte Music School students at Nihonbashi Mitsui Tower	orchestra
	Tokyo	Chika Edanami & NHK Symphony Orchestra Assistant Concertmaster Rintaro Omiya at Nihonbashi Mitsui Tower	violins
	Tokyo	Duo Cosmos at Furomae Cafe	piano four hands
	Osaka	Yoshinori Nishitsuji and friends at Rinku Papillio "Star of Square"	violin, piano & accordion
	Nara	Ikaruga Hall foyer Natsuki Umemoto (R) & Yoshinori Nishitsuji	recorder & accordion
	Nara	Trattoria Maezawa Mitsuki Fukuhara (P), Natsuki Umemoto (R), Yoshinori Nishitsuji	piano, recorder & accordion
	Tokyo	Kenji Nakagi at Nihonbashi Mitsui Tower	cello
	Koyasan	"Bach in Japan's 1200 Year Old Buddhist Town" Yoshinori Nishitsuji & Rika Onoue (S)	accordion, piano & soprano
	Tokyo	Leipzig Bach Competition 1st Prize Winner Seiji Okamoto at Yamate Church	violin
	Hiroshima	Mihara Chamber Orchestra	flute & string orchestra
	Tokyo	Tokyo Metropolitan Orchestra Principal Oboe Tomoyuki Hirota & chamber orchestra at Omotesando Hills	chamber orchestra
	Tokyo	Wieniawski Competition winner Keiko Urushihara, University of Music Detmold Piano Professor Jacob Leuschner, Morita String Quartet violinist Masahiro Morita & cellists Kenji Nakagi & Christopher S. Gibson at Hakuju Hall	cellos, violins & cembalo
Lithuania	Vilnius	Baroque Contempo (former Sel member Silvija Pankūnaitė, former Pieno lazeriai member Vytis Smolskas & soprano Karolina Glinskaitė) at Vilnius Railway Station	voices & piano
Mexico	Mexico City	Conservatorio Nacional de Música de México – "A Little Homage to Bach in Mexico"	violin, clarinet, French horn, tuba & Piano
	Chihuahua	Philharmonic Orchestra of the State of Chihuahua, Sistema Musical Se'Wá, Kapellmeister Ensamble Coral, Universidad Autónoma de Chihuahua Conservatorio de Música faculty, students & symphony orchestra	mixed
New Zealand	Auckland	Auckland Philharmonia Orchestra's APO Young Achievers at Britomart Transport Centre	string quartet
	Wellington	New Zealand School of Music students at Lambton Quay & Wellington Railway Station	viola & cello
	Wellington	New Zealand String Quartet's Helene Pohl & Rolf Gjelsten at City Gallery	violin & cello
	Dunedin	University of Otago Executant Lecturer of Cello Heleen du Plessis with Elaine Wilden at Dunedin Hospital	cellos
	Dunedin	University of Otago Executant Lecturer of Cello Heleen du Plessis, University of Otago students & Southern Sinfonia members – "Cellists of Otago" at St Paul's Cathedral, Toitū Otago Settlers Museum & Dunedin Railway Station	cellos
Nigeria	Lagos	Devon Carpenter at Lagoon Restaurant	Celtic harp
Norway	Bergen	Fana Unge Strykere at Strømgaten 2 Railway Station	cellos & violins
	Kristiansand	University of Agder students at the University of Agder, Sandens, Kristiansand Airport & Sørlandets Travpark	piano, voice, clarinet & double bass
Philippines	Makati, Muntinlupa & Quezon City	Manila Symphony Orchestra at Ayala Malls	mixed
	Muntinlupa	Manila Symphony Orchestra with Renato Lucas & Karen Fatima Francisco at Corte de las Palmas	orchestra, cello & piano
Portugal	Castelo Branco	Escola Superior de Artes Applicadas students at Central Bus Station & Sacristia da Sé Concatedral	violins, bass, guitar, piano, harpsichords & vocal
	Lisbon	Holland Baroque Society founder Tineke Steenbrink with João Ramos Marta, Alieke Pijl & Anna Schweizer	harpsichord, flutes & cello
Puerto Rico	Old San Juan	Conservatorio de Música de Puerto Rico Professor Luis Hernández-Mergal Bach Open House	piano
Scotland	Glasgow	Royal Conservatoire of Scotland students at Glasgow Subway	mixed
Singapore	Singapore	T'ang Quartet at Dhoby Ghaut MRT Station, The Tube at Orchard Gateway, Raffles City Shopping Centre, CityLink Mall & Bayfront MRT Station	string quartet
Slovenia	Ljubljana	University of Ljubljana Academy of Music students at the Academy of Music, Adamič-Lundrovo nabrežje 2 & Pasaža Maximarketa	mixed
South Africa	Johannesburg	Buskaid Soweto String Ensemble at Nedbank Diepkloof Square	violins
South Korea	Seoul	Arietta Ensemble & Magic A at Children's Grand Park Station	vioin, viola, clarinet & piano
	Seoul	Educastra at Yeouinaru Station	brass band
	Seoul	Ryeon Flute at Samgakji Station	flute trio
	Seoul	Seoul Motet Choir & Vermeer's Friends at COEX Mall	string ensemble
Spain	Seville	Escuela de Música Joaquín Turina students at Puerta Jerez metro station	orchestra, cello quartet, guitar duo & violins
	Pamplona	HelloCello! at Civivox Condestable	cellos
Sweden	Lund	LIMUS Music School	mixed
	Stockholm	Swedish String Teachers' Association members at Stadion metro station	strings
Taiwan	Kaohsiung	"Bach in Formosa"	violin, viola, cello, trumpet, horn, trombone, tuba, flute & vocal
Thailand	Bangkok	College of Music at Mahidol University faculty & students at Kamphaeng Phet Station	singers, strings & flute
Ukraine	Lviv	Cantus Chamber Choir, Youth Academic Symphony Orchestra INSO-Lviv conducted by Natalia Ponomarchuk, Dudaryk Choir, Lviv State Musical College Youth Choir, St. Olga and Elizabeth Cathedral Nadiya Youth Choir, Academic Chamber Orchestra Lviv Virtuosos, Choir of The Holy Eucharist Church Soli Deo & Lviv Philharmonic Orchestra at Lviv Organ and Chamber Music Hall	mixed
	Lviv	Lviv Philharmonic Orchestra, Galician Academic Chamber Choir, Ethella Chupryk, Youth Academic Symphony Orchestra INSO-Lviv, Royal Flemish Philharmonic Principal Flutist Aldo Baerten & Lviv Chamber Orchestra ACADEMIA at Lyudkevych Concert Hall of Lviv Philharmonic	mixed
	Lviv	Regional J.S. Bach Festival Competition winners, Collegium Musicum members & High Castle Academic Ensemble at Potocki Palace	mixed
United States	Massachusetts: Cambridge	A Far Cry cellist Michael Unterman with Kristin Olson & Tatiana Duabek at Harvard Square Red Line	cello, oboe & violin
	Washington: Seattle	American Guild of Organists' Alan Berg All-Bach Open House	mixed
	Washington: Seattle	American Viola Society Gardner Competition 1st Prize Winner Rachel Matthews & students at Beacon Hill Light Rail Station	piano
	Florida: Fort Lauderdale	Artserve at Fort Lauderdale Library	mixed
	Georgia: Atlanta	Atlanta Symphony Orchestra Principal musicians Christina Smith, Elisabeth Remy Johnson & Christopher Rex at Lenox Mall	flute, harp & cello
	Texas: Houston	Bach Society Houston 12 Hour Bach Marathon at Christ the King Lutheran Church	mixed
	Massachusetts: Boston	Berklee College of Music students at South Station	chamber orchestra & choir
	New York: Brooklyn	Bern Dibner Library, NYU Polytechnic School of Engineering (Kay Lugh)	piano
	Massachusetts: Boston	Boston Symphony Orchestra cellist Mickey Katz at Park Street, Downtown Crossing & Harvard Square subway stations	cello
	Kentucky: Murray	Bourbon Baroque Artistic Director John Austin Clark at Murry State University's Price Doyle Fine Arts Center	piano
	Vermont: Burlington	Burlington Chamber Orchestra at Burlington Town Center	chamber orchestra
	Washington: Kent	Centerpiece Jazz Band members at Kent Lutheran Church	electric guitar & electric bass
	Nebraska: Lincoln	Chiara String Quartet violist Jonah Sirota at The Railyard	viola
	California: Claremont	Claremont School of Music violin faculty Ellen Jung, Jeff Gauthier, University of Redlands viola faculty Kira Blumberg & Eclipse Quartet/Mojave Trio cellist Maggie Parkins at Laemmle Claremont 5	string quartet
	California: Claremont	Claremont Symphony Orchestra violinist Yina Ma at Claremont Village Square	violin
	Virginia: Williamsburg	College of William & Mary Instructor of Organ, Piano & Harpsichord Thomas Marshall & Professor Ruth van Baak Griffioen at Wren Library	organ & recorder
	Ohio: Cincinnati	Consort in the Egg at Nordstrom Kenwood Towne Centre	recorders
	Washington: Seattle	Dusty Strings Music School	strings
	New York: Rochester	Eastman School of Music students at Hart's Local Grocers	mixed
	California: Santa Monica	Elemental Strings students at Santa Monica Place	strings
	Massachusetts: Boston	Emmanuel Music at Emmanuel Church	orchestra
	Massachusetts: Boston	Ensemble Terpsichore at Back Bay Station	choral ensemble
	Massachusetts: Boston	First Lutheran Church of Boston – "Boston Bach Birthday 330"	mixed
	Florida: Boca Raton	Florida Atlantic University Department of Music Assistant Professor Dr. Irena Kofman & students at Boca Raton Museum of Art	piano
	Washington: Issaquah	Foothills Cello Choir at Gilman Village	cellos
	South Carolina: Greenville	Greenville Symphony Orchestra at Hendricks Library, Hughes Main Library & Symphony Center	mixed
	Indiana: Indianapolis	IndyBaroque Music, Inc. members & friends at St. Vincent Hospital, Fashion Mall at Keystone & Indianapolis Public Library Central Branch	mixed
	Washington: Lynden	Jansen Art Center	mixed
	New York: New York	John Mark Rozendaal at Dyckman/200th St A Train	baroque cello
	Washington: Seattle	Jovino Santos Neto (Cornish College of the Arts Professor) at SeaTac Lightrail Transit Station	piano
	California: Berkeley	Junior Bach Festival at Downtown Berkeley BART Station	bassoon, guitar, marimba, steel drum & more
	Washington: Seattle	Ladies Musical Club of Seattle members at Classic Pianos & Caffe Appassionato	piano & soprano
	Pennsylvania: Annville	Lebanon Valley College – "Bach in 10"	mixed
	New York: New York	Lindsey Horner at 181 Street A Train Station	upright bass
	Texas: Irving	Lone Star Youth Orchestra at Irving Arts Center	mixed
	California: Los Angeles	Los Angeles Zoo – Sterling Flute Choir	flutes
	Georgia: Fort Valley	Mary Ann & David Thames at St. Andrew's Episcopal Church	violin & cello da spalla
	Washington: Seattle	Melia Watras (University of Washington School of Music Strings Chair) & Seattle Symphony pianist Kimberly Russ at Nordstrom Flagship Store	viola & piano
	Tennessee: Memphis	Memphis Public Library – Duetto Memphisto	mandolin & guitar
	Massachusetts: Boston	Mistral at Harvard Square	chamber orchestra
	California: Palo Alto	Mitchell Park Library (Andrew Lu & Emil Ernström)	flute & keyboard
	Mississippi: Oxford	Mockingbird Early Music Ensemble at Off Square Books	recorders, viole da gamba, harp, baroque guitar, psaltery, crumhorn & harpsichord
	California: Modesto	Modesto Junior College Community Orchestra at 10th Street Plaza	orchestra
	California: Los Angeles	MUSE/IQUE members at L.A. Central Library	cello & violins
	New York: Ellenville	Music Institute Of Sullivan And Ulster Counties faculty at St. Johns Episcopal Church	violin, viola & cello
	Washington: Seattle	Musikgarten faculty and students & Phinney Ridge Lutheran Church's Children's Choir Director Evelyn Hartwell and students at Caffe Appassionato	piano
	Florida: Pompano Beach	MusikMakers	mixed
	California: Claremont	National Cello Institute faculty Lynn Burrows & Edris Boyll-Kuzia at Laemmle's Claremont 5	violin & cello
	South Dakota: Vermillion	National Music Museum – "Bach in the Museum"	mixed
	Massachusetts: Boston	New England Conservatory of Music students	mixed
	Massachusetts: Boston	North End Music and Performing Arts Center faculty David Hurtado Gómez at Downtown Crossing subway	cello
	Ohio: Columbus	Ohio Capital Winds at Barnes and Noble	wind ensemble
	North Carolina: Charlotte	Opera Carolina at Amelie's Bakery & 7th Street Public Market	voices
	Washington: Seattle	Orchestra Seattle violinist Jason Hershey at Caffe Appassionato	violin
	Oregon: Portland	Oregon Guitar Quartet at Zoo/Washington Park metro stop	guitar quartet
	California: Glendale	Pasadena Conservatory of Music Cello Ensemble at Glendale Metrolink Station	cellos
	California: Los Angeles	Pasadena Conservatory of Music Violin and Viola Program Director Mary Kelly & Lamp Arts Program students at Lamp Community	violin & soprano
	Washington: Seattle	Paul Taub (Cornish College of the Arts Professor) with students & Rainbow City Orchestra at SeaTac Lightrail Transit Station	flute & mixed
	South Carolina: Laurens	Presbyterian College Associate Professor of Music Dr. Richard Thomas at Laurens County Public Library	cello
	Pennsylvania: Philadelphia	Rachel's Cellist Eve Miller & friends at Suburban Station	cello, baroque bassoon, baroque flute & recorders
	Rhode Island: East Providence	Rhode Island Philharmonic Music School at Carter Center for Music Education & Performance	mixed
	California: Beverly Hills	Riko Method School of Piano at Steinway Piano Gallery of Beverly Hills	piano
	Texas: San Antonio	San Antonio Symphony musicians at San Antonio Public Library's Great Northwest Branch & Pan American Branch	cello & violin
	California: San Francisco	San Francisco Civic Symphony members at Powell Station	strings
	Washington: Seattle	Seattle Historical Arts for Kids, Rajan Krishnaswami & Seattle Flute Choir at Westlake Transit Tunnel	strings, cello & flutes
	Washington: Seattle	Seattle Philharmonic Orchestra musicians at Crossroads Mall	oboe, violin, viola & cello
	Washington: Seattle	Seattle Violoncello Society – "Complete Cello Suites Marathon" at Phinney Ridge Lutheran Church	cellos
	Washington: Seattle	Seattle-Tacoma International Airport	mixed
	Illinois: Carbondale	Southern Illinois University Carbondale students & faculty	cello, violin & flute
	California: Culver City	STAR Prep Academy at The Lion's Fountain	string quartet
	California: Van Nuys	Suzuki Music Program of Los Angeles students & teachers at Lake Balboa Park	strings
	Oklahoma: Tulsa	Tulsa Symphony members at Tulsa Transit Station, Guthrie Green, Utica Square Courtyard, Woodland Hills Mall & Oklahoma Methodist Manor	mixed
	Minnesota: Minneapolis	Twin Cities Chapter of the American Guild of Organists presented in cooperation with Minnesota Public Radio's Pipedreams at Hennepin Avenue United Methodist Church, First Unitarian Society, Lake of the Isles Lutheran Church, Saint Paul's Episcopal Church & Episcopal Cathedral of Saint Mark	organ
	Massachusetts: Amherst	UMass Amherst students at Amherst Books, Subway Sandwich Shop & The Works Bakery and Café	violins & cellos
	California: Los Angeles	Union Station 10 Hour Bach Marathon: Pomona College cello faculty Roger Lebow, Los Angeles Organ Company, Enlightenment Music Series, Neil Galanter & Dan Arthur Fritz, Isaura String Quartet, Los Angeles Opera Orchestra violinist James Stark, Miguel Atwood-Ferguson & Palisades Symphony Orchestra Principal Bass Denisa Hanna	mixed
	Idaho: Moscow	University of Idaho Lionel Hampton School of Music faculty at Moscow Brewing Company	violin, trombone, guitar & cello
	Iowa: Iowa City	University of Iowa Cello Professor Anthony Arnone at Old Capital	cello
	North Carolina: Winston-Salem	University of North Carolina School of the Arts & Salem College organ studios at Crawford Hall	organ
	Oregon: Eugene	University of Oregon School of Music faculty Dr. John J. Jantzi in conjunction with the American Guild of Organists Eugene Chapter at Episcopal Church of the Resurrection	organ
	South Carolina: Columbia	University of South Carolina School of Music students at Drip Coffee	clarinet quartet, cello, guitar, flute solo & flute quartet
	Utah: Salt Lake City	Utah Symphony members at Salt Lake City International Airport	mixed
	Utah: Salt Lake City	Utah Symphony Youth Guild students at Salt Lake City Public Library	mixed
	Washington: Seattle	Washington Chapter of the Percussive Arts Society's Kendra McLean & Memmi Ochi at REI Store & Crossroads Mall	marimbas
	Washington: Bellevue	"Well-Tempered Clavier Marathon" at Classic Pianos of Bellevue/Seattle, Washington	piano
Wales	Llandudno	Ensemble Cymru at The Tabernacle, Victoria Centre, Venue Cymru & BHS Store	brass

== Bach in the Subways 2016–present ==
Following the enormous success of Bach in the Subways Day 2015, which fell on a Saturday, it was decided to extend the festival to the days and weekend before or after the birthday, so performers could again participate on the weekend. Additionally the word "Day" was dropped to avoid confusion. Since then, every March countless musicians and organizations in hundreds of cities in over 40 countries around the world join the cause to bring as much live Bach to humanity as possible.

== See also ==
- List of Bach festivals
- List of early music festivals
