= Ricardo Roberto Francia =

Argentine musician (1932–2021)

Ricardo Roberto Francia (20 May 1932 – 1 November 2021) was an Argentine musician, cellist, and music arranger.

== Early life and education ==
Ricardo Roberto Francia was born in Buenos Aires on 20 May 1932. He graduated from Manuel de Falla Conservatory of Music. He took cello classes from professor Ernesto Cobelli and studied harmony and counterpoint with professor Athos Palma.

== Career ==
In 1952 he won a cello contest to become a member of Orquesta Sinfonica Juvenil LRA Radio Nacional which at the time was conducted by Maestro Luis Gianneo. Ricardo Francia was also a member of Cuarteto de Cuerdas del Conservatorio de Santa Cecilia. Later that year he became well acquainted with tango music and then he was hired as a cellist by Maestro Emilio Orlando's Orchestra, and successively by other orchestras with Maestros Jorge Fernandez, Florindo Sassone, Carlitos García, Angel D'Agostino, Miguel Caló, Osvaldo Fresedo, Roberto Caló and Enrique Mario Francini.

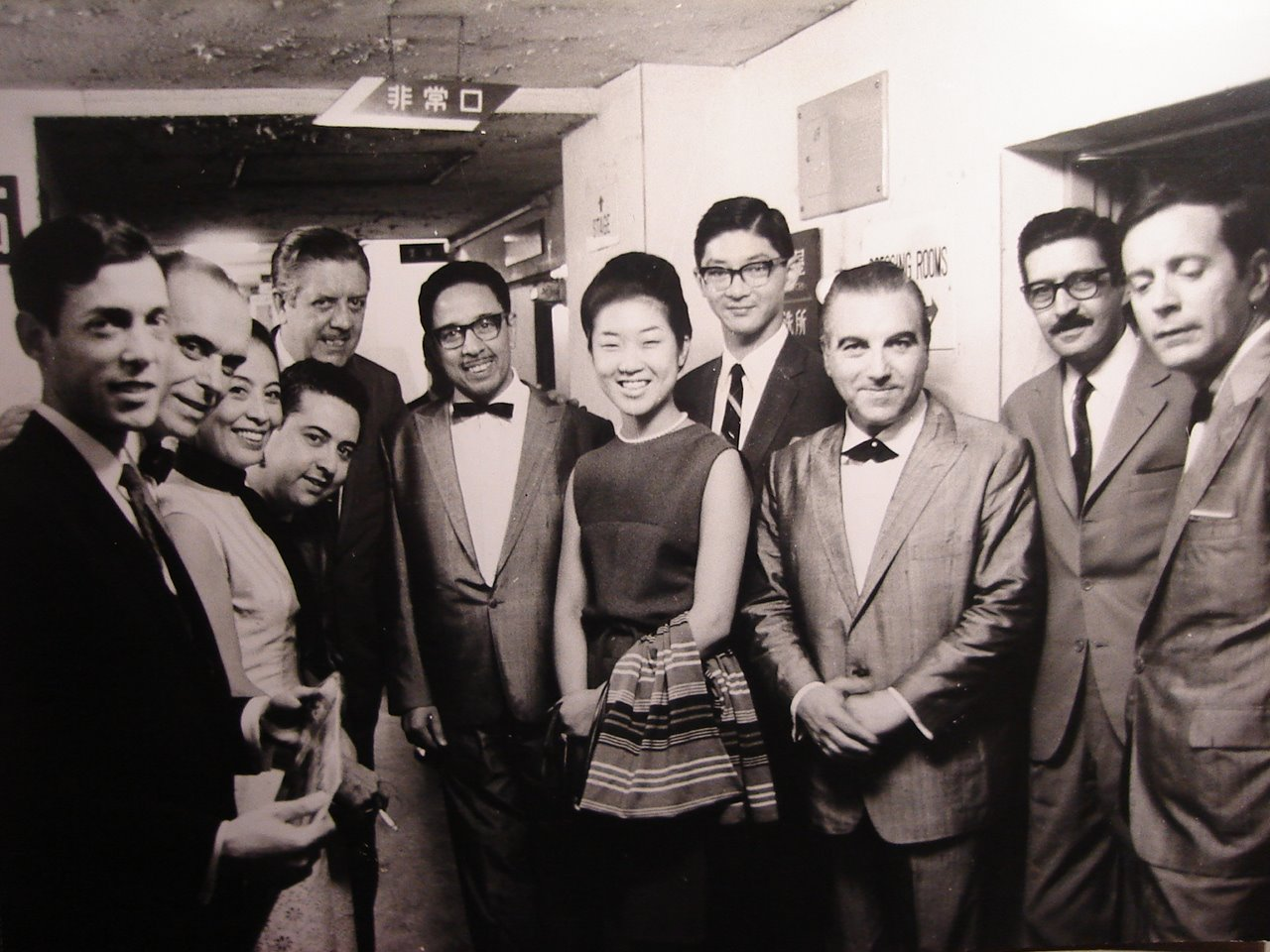
Ricardo Francia, Quinteto Real, The Princess of Japan, Suga (Takako) (清宮貴子 Suga-no-miya Takako, born March 3rd 1939) her fiancé Shimazu Hisanaga

In 1959, Ricardo Francia obtained a position as a cellist and music arranger with Tokyo Yomiuri Orchestra in Tokyo, Japan, where he stayed for ten years. In 1961, he was hired for a recording session with Maestro Francisco Canaro who, at the time, happened to be with his orchestra in Tokyo. Settled in Tokyo, Ricardo Francia started his own Tango Orchestra with all Japanese musicians except for Argentinian bandoneonist Fernando Tell. In 1970, Ricardo Francia returned to his hometown Buenos Aires and became a member of Sexteto Francini 70, along with prestigious musicians Maestro Enrique Francini, Maestro Nestor Marconi, Juan José Paz, Omar Murtagh and Romano Di Paolo.

Francia was also hired as a cellist with Orquesta Sinfónica del Festival Teatro Colón, and then as a soloist with Orquesta Sinfónica de la ciudad de Corrientes. He later became part of the teaching staff at Instituto Superior de Música de Corrientes.

In 1974, he was hired as violoncello soloist with Orquesta Sinfónica del Paraguay as well as with Orquesta de Cámara del Paraguay. Two years later, he won a contest for substitute soloist with Orquesta Sinfónica de Rosario, Argentina. There, along with some fellow musicians he founded Quinteto Argentino de Arcos. He later returned to Buenos Aires and started as a cellist for Orquesta del Tango de Buenos Aires. After that, he was hired by Fundacion Teatro Colón.

In 1988, Francia was hired by CBC Japan Radio & TV known as Chubu-Nippon Broadcasting to conduct Orquesta Simbolo Francisco Canaro. The following year, CBC Nagoya (Chubu-Nippon Broadcasting), hired him to perform with his ensemble Quinteto Argentino de Arcos.

In 1991 he started working with tango Maestros Raul Garello and Carlitos Garcia in order to give concerts in Japan. In 1994, CBC Japan Radio & TV (Chubu-Nippon Broadcasting) hired him again along with his ensemble Quinteto Argentino de Cuerdas

== Later life and death ==
Francia later performed freelance work teaching violoncello and orchestra instrumentation for Escuela de Musica SADEM. He died in Buenos Aires on 1 November 2021, at the age of 89.
