= Sergei Prikhodko (footballer, born 1962) =

Russian footballer

Personal information
- Full name: Sergei Aleksandrovich Prikhodko
- Date of birth: 7 March 1962 (age 64)
- Place of birth: Karaganda, Kazakh SSR
- Height: 1.87 m (6 ft 1 1/2 in)
- Position: Goalkeeper

Youth career
- Shakhter Karagandy

Senior career*
Years	Team	Apps	(Gls)
1980–1981	Spartak Kostroma	23	(0)
1982–1983	Iskra Smolensk	21	(0)
1983–1988	Zenit Leningrad	13	(0)
1988	Metallurg Lipetsk	5	(0)
1988–1990	Rotor Volgograd	14	(0)
1990–1991	CSKA Moscow	0	(0)
1992–1995	Gabčíkovo		
1995–1999	Zenit St. Petersburg	24	(0)

Managerial career
- 1999–2002: Zenit St. Petersburg (assistant)
- 2003: Petrotrest St. Petersburg (GK coach)
- 2006–2008: Metalurh Zaporizhya (GK coach)
- 2010–2011: Dinamo Minsk (GK coach)
- 2012: Narva Trans
- 2013–2014: Dinamo Minsk (GK coach)
- * Club domestic league appearances and goals

Sergei Aleksandrovich Prikhodko (Russian: Серге́й Александрович Приходько; born 7 March 1962) is a Russian professional football coach and a former player.

== Club career ==
He made his professional debut in the Soviet Second League in 1980 for Spartak Kostroma.

He played for CSKA Moscow in the USSR Federation Cup.

== Personal life ==
His son Sergei Sergeyevich Prikhodko is also a professional footballer.

== Honours ==
- USSR Federation Cup finalist: 1986.
- He was on the rosters when FC Zenit Leningrad and PFC CSKA Moscow won the Soviet Top League in 1984 and 1991 respectively, but did not play in a single league game in either of those seasons.
