= Francesco Aliani =

Italian cellist

Francesco Aliani (9 April 1762 – 28 May 1812) was an Italian cellist. He was a major figure in the musical life of Piacenza in the early nineteenth century.

He was born at Piacenza. He for a time studied the violin under his father, who was first violin in the orchestra, but afterwards devoted studied under Giuseppe Rovelli of Bergamo, then in service to Ferdinand, Duke of Parma. Five years later, he returned home and was appointed first cellist of the orchestras of church and theatre at Piacenza. In autumn 1803 and carnival 1804, he played at the Teatro Carcano, but spent most of his career at Piacenza. He became the representative of the Società Filarmonica of Piacenza.

He was celebrated as a teacher of his instrument. He wrote three books of duets for two cellos.

His son, Luigi, born in Piacenza in 1789, was a noted violinist.
