= Sergei Prikhodko (footballer, born 1984) =

Russian footballer

Sergei Prihodko
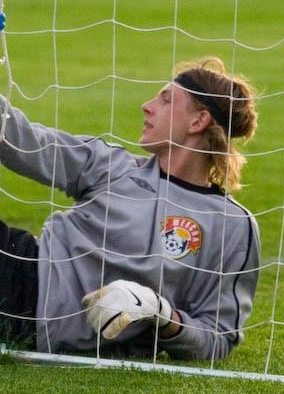
- Sergei Prikhodko in action for FC Sheksna

Personal information
- Full name: Sergei Sergeyevich Prihodko
- Date of birth: 9 May 1984 (age 42)
- Place of birth: Leningrad, now St. Petersburg, Russian SFSR
- Height: 1.90 m (6 ft 3 in)
- Position: Goalkeeper

Youth career
- FC Zenit Saint Petersburg
- Smena Saint Petersburg

Senior career*
Years	Team	Apps	(Gls)
2001	FC Zenit St. Petersburg	0	(0)
2002–2004	FC Zenit-2 St. Petersburg	25	(0)
2005	FC Sokol Saratov	14	(0)
2007	FC Sheksna Cherepovets	27	(0)
2008–2010	FC Chornomorets Odesa	1	(0)
2010–2012	FC Sheksna Cherepovets	51	(0)
2012	JK Narva Trans	20	(0)
2014	FC Znamya Truda Orekhovo-Zuyevo	6	(0)
2014	FC TSK Simferopol	1	(0)
- * Club domestic league appearances and goals

Sergei Sergeyevich Prikhodko (Russian: Серге́й Серге́евич Приходько; born 9 May 1984) is a former Russian football goalkeeper.

== Club career ==
His father, also Sergei, is a former goalkeeper who coached his son while an assistant at FC Zenit Saint Petersburg. They both moved to Russian Football National League club FC Sokol-Saratov in 2005.
