= Vladimir Perlin =

Soviet-Belarusian cellist and pedagogue

- Born: 1 March 1942 (age 84); Frunze, Kirghiz SSR, Soviet Union (now Bishkek, Kyrgyzstan)
- Occupations: Cellist, pedagogue, conductor
- Awards

Vladimir Pavlovich Perlin (Russian: Владимир Па́влович Перлин; born 1 March 1942) is a Soviet and Belarusian cellist and pedagogue.

== Biography ==
Vladimir Perlin was born in Frunze to Berta Borisovna Fidlon and Pavel Grigorievich Perlin, who had escaped from Siege of Leningrad. After World War II his family moved to Minsk. At the age of 7 he began to study cello at the music school of Belarusian State Academy of Music. He graduated from the class of Professor Aleksander Piatigorsky (Stogorsky) (the brother of the renowned cellist Gregor Piatigorsky) in Belarusian State Academy of Music in 1965 having won the national music competition.

From 1971 he has been upbringing young musicians in the Republican Music College of Belarus (RMC) and later in 1984 took up a professorship of the Cello in the Belarusian State Academy of Music, a position he holds to this day. Many of his talented cello pupils have been winners of international competitions as well as being soloists and orchestral cellists in many countries. His masterclasses take place in Belgium, Holland, Germany, France, USA and Russia. In 2018 he was invited as a cello pedagogue in Musica Mundi School for professional music education in Waterloo, Belgium.

In 2003, for his significant contribution to music education, Perlin was appointed Officier de l'Odre des Palmes Académiques de la République Française. He was the first Belarusian to receive this title.

Aside from his teaching duties, since 1988 Vladimir Perlin is Founder, artistic director and chief conductor of the Chamber Orchestra of young musicians in RMC, which he regularly leads on tours around the world. Perlin is also frequently invited to serve as a jury member of international cello competitions.

== Films ==
Two full length documentary films were made about Vladimir Perlin and his students and were broadcast in different countries:

- “Every Sound Finds Its Echo On The Earth…” by Mikhail Zhdanovsky (Belarusian Videocentre, 1995), which became the winner of the National Cinema Festival.
- “Une autre vie” by Dominique Pernoo (France, 1999)

== Honours and awards ==
Republic of Belarus

Honored Artist of Republic of Belarus (1992)
Order of Francysk Skaryna (2012)

Foreign

Officier dans l’Ordre des Palmes Académiques (2003)
Commandeur de l’Ordre des Arts et des Lettres (2013)
