= Yale Cellos =

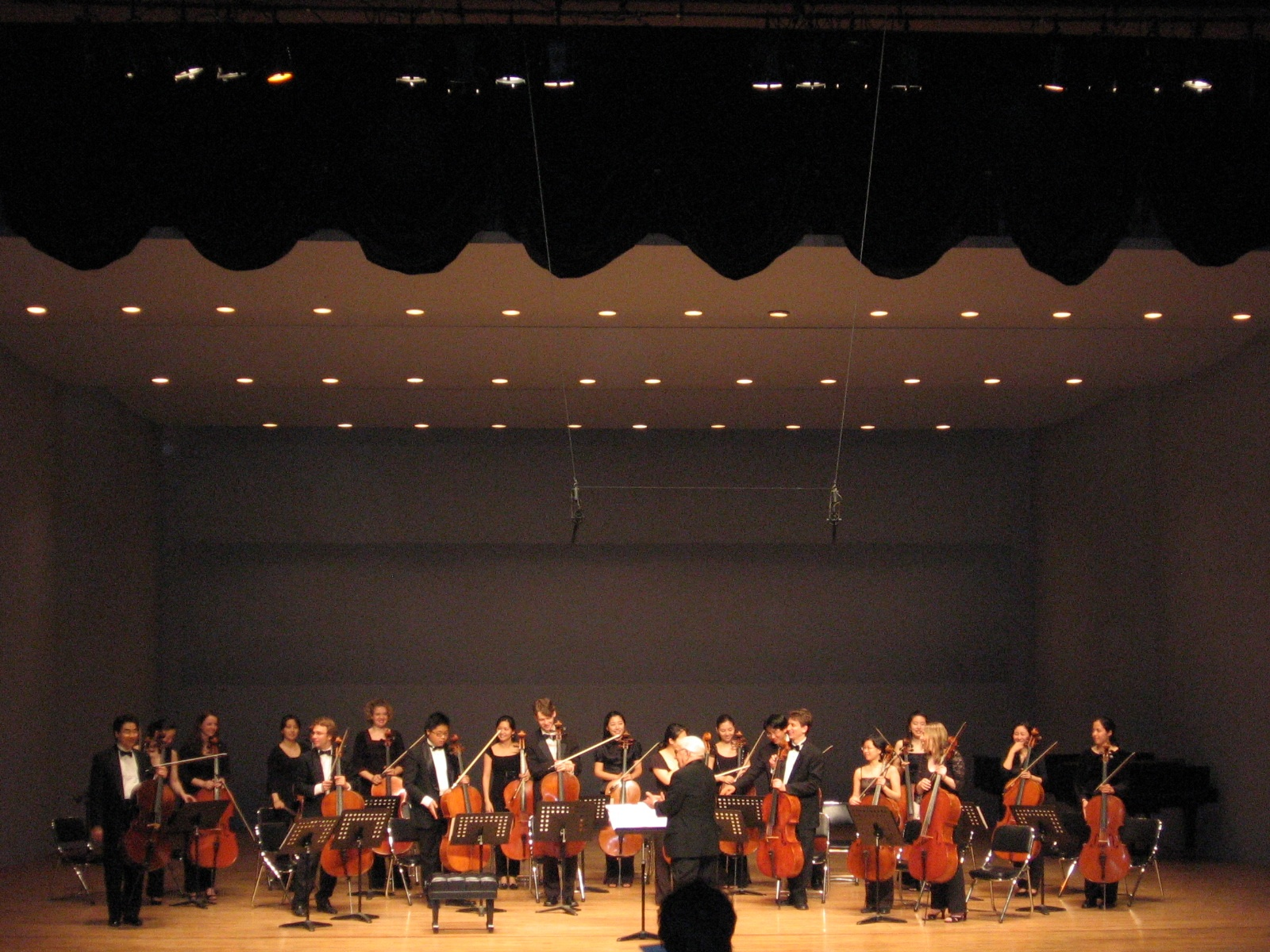
Yale Cellos, South Korea, 2005

Yale Cellos is an ensemble at the Yale School of Music consisting of the School of Music's cello studio—roughly 15 cellists. The group was founded in 1983 by the famed cello teacher Aldo Parisot, the former professor of cello at the Yale School of Music. Currently, the cellists study with Paul Watkins. Since its formation, the group has produced several CDs, one of which earned a Grammy nomination.

== Notable members and alumni ==
- Inbal Segev
- Shauna Rolston
- Jian Wang (cellist)
- Tanya Anisimova
- Jesús Castro-Balbi
- Johann Sebastian Paetsch
- Bion Tsang
- Maya Beiser
- Matt Brubeck
- Agnès Vesterman
- Bejun Mehta
- Christopher Adkins
- Ole Akahoshi
- Patrick Jee
- Yves Dharamraj
- Mihai Marica
