= Juan Carlos Fernández-Nieto =

Spanish-American pianist

- Born: January 26, 1987 (age 38); Salamanca, Spain
- Genres: Classical music
- Instrument: Piano
- Website: juancarlosfernandeznieto.com

Juan Carlos Fernández-Nieto (born January 26, 1987) is a Spanish-American pianist. He was described by Westdeutsche Allgemeine Zeitung as "A musical sculptor who chisels out melodic lines with sharp contours". and "He set off a firework on the 88 piano keys which excited the audience in the Kulturzentrum right from the start"

== Early life and education ==
Fernández-Nieto was born in Salamanca, Spain, the eldest of three children. Due to his father's job, the family moved often. Days after his birth, they relocated to Figueras. There here spent his first years of life. After his family moved to Valladolid, he started to show interest in music. He began studying piano and violin at the age of four, and gave his first concert at seven.

At the age of 11 Fernández-Nieto started to take classes with Julia Díaz-Yanes, and in 2003 began studying under Claudio Martínez Mehner at the Conservatorio Superior de Música de Castilla y León in Salamanca. In 2007 Fernández-Nieto moved to the United States to study with Boris Berman at the Yale School of Music, receiving a Master of Music in 2009 and an Artist Diploma in 2010. He later pursued a Doctor of Musical Arts in piano performance at Graduate Center of the City University of New York studying under Ursula Oppens.

== Career ==
=== 2000–2010: Early career ===
In 2000, at the age of thirteen, Fernández-Nieto won First Prize in the Ciudad de Linares National Piano Competition.

Fernández-Nieto made his debut as a soloist in 2003 at the age of sixteen with the Orquesta Ciudad de Granada performing Mozart’s Piano Concerto in D minor under the baton of Lutz Köhler to critical acclaim in a live broadcast on Radio Nacional de España.

In the period of 2003-2010 he appeared as a soloist of RTVE Symphony Orchestra, Orchestra Sinfonica di Bari, Orquesta de Extremadura, Orquesta Sinfonica de Castilla y León, he performed in Auditorio Manuel de Falla, Auditorio Monumental, Steinway Hall in New York City. and also collaborated with Tokyo String Quartet and the Grammy-nominated "Yale Cellos" under the direction of Aldo Parisot. He was featured on the Messiaen Centennial Celebration at Yale performing Vingt Regards sur l’enfant-Jésus and appeared in Norfolk Music at Yale in 2010 and in The Holland Music Sessions in 2007.

Fernández-Nieto won First Prize in the National Piano Competition in Leon in 2005, Third Prize in CSMTA Young Artists Competition in 2008, and First Prize in Chamber Music Society at Yale in 2010. He also received the George Miles Fellowship, Linda & Alan Englander Fellowship, and the Yale Alumni Prize.

=== 2010–present ===
In 2014, Fernández-Nieto won the Second Prize in 56th Jaen International Piano Competition. In two following seasons he had debuts in Teatro de la Maestranza, Fundación Scherzo, Teatros del Canal, Royal Dublin Society, Fundación Juan March, Teatro Nacional de El Salvador, appeared in Wintergreen Performing Arts in 2014 and Stony Brook Piano Festival in 2015, and performed as a soloist with Orquesta Nacional de El Salvador, Orquesta Ciudad de Granada.

Fernández-Nieto's international career has been rapidly flourishing after he stepped in last minute performing Mozart Piano Concerto Jeunehomme at Carnegie Hall with The Chamber Orchestra of New York in 2017, which resulted in a standing ovation. Same year he became a prize winner of the Iturbi International Piano Competition, and debuted in St. Martin in the Fields and St James's Picadilly in London, Chicago Cultural Center, Schumann Haus in Zwickau, Kharkiv State Academic Opera and Ballet Theatre, Palau de la Música, and performed with Covent Garden Chamber Orchestra and Orquesta de Valencia.

In 2018 Fernández-Nieto won the Audience Prize and the Canon Prize in XIX Paloma O’Shea Santander International Piano Competition, and performed in Klavier-Festival Ruhr, Classical Bridge Music Festival in New York, Festival Internacional de Santander, Semana Internacional de la Música in Medina del Campo, and as a soloist with Orquesta Nacional de Colombia in Teatro Colón in Bogotá

== Discography ==
Fernández-Nieto's debut album, Carnaval, a monographic of music of Schumann, features both his carnavals. It was recorded in 2016 on the Odradek Records label.

The recording of Fernández-Nieto's debut in the Klavier-Festival Ruhr was published as "Vive la France! Debussy & Saint-Saint-Saëns (Edition Ruhr Piano Festival, Vol. 37)" in 2019 on the CAvi-music, on which he plays the Six Bagatelles, op. 3 by Camille Saint-Saëns as well as three valses from the same composer.

== Media appearances ==
Fernández-Nieto has been a featured guest in the TV shows as "Programa de Mano" and "Los Conciertos" on La 2, "Musical Cities" 2017 Mediaset, on Televisión Castilla y León; and on the radio shows as "Estudio 206" and "Cafe Zimmerman" "La dársena" on Radio Clásica (Radio Nacional de España), on Deutschlandfunk, Cadena Cope, Cadena Ser, Radio Nacional de El Salvador, Price-Rubin Radio.

He has been featured as well in specialized magazines as Gramophone UK, Ritmo, Scherzo, Melómano and Platea Magazine.
