= David Schwartz (violist) =

American violinist (1916–2013)

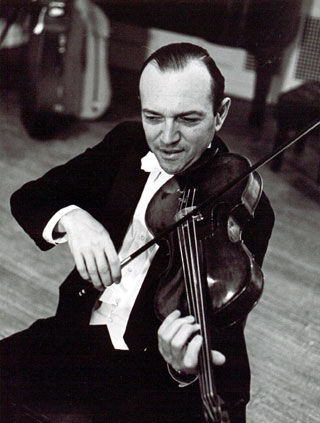
- David Schwartz at the viola in the 1960s

Background information
- Born: June 18, 1916; Detroit, Michigan, United States
- Died: June 5, 2013 (aged 96)
- Genre: Western classical
- Occupations: Violist; instructor
- Instrument: Viola
- Years active: fl. ca. 1920–1996
- Label: RCA Victor Columbia Masterworks

David Schwartz (June 18, 1916 – June 5, 2013) was an American violist and music instructor. Schwartz's career spanned orchestral music, chamber music, and studio recording, but he is most recognized for his chamber music performances and recordings with the Yale and Paganini Quartets.

== Musical education ==
Schwartz studied viola at Curtis Institute under teachers Louis Bailly and Max Aronoff.

== Orchestral career ==
Schwartz joined the Cleveland Orchestra at age 20. At age 23 he was promoted by Cleveland conductor Artur Rodzinski to the role of principal violist. He performed and toured with Leopold Stokowski's All-American Youth Orchestra. During World War II, he enlisted in the Air Force and became lead violist of the Glenn Miller Army Air Force Band in 1943. After the war he performed with the Detroit Symphony under Paul Paray, the NBC Staff Orchestra and the NBC Symphony Orchestra under Arturo Toscanini and was principal violist of the Puerto Rico Symphony for its inaugural season under Pablo Casals. He also performed solo at Carnegie Hall in New York City in the early 1960s.

== Chamber music ==
In his 20s, Schwartz performed with the Walden String Quartet (Homer Schmitt, violin; Bernard Goodman, violin; Robert Swenson, cello) in concert hall and radio broadcast chamber music programs. Later he performed with the Cremona String Trio. From 1958–1960 he toured Asia, South America and the United States as violist of the Paganini Quartet, based out of Los Angeles. While teaching viola at Yale he joined the Yale Quartet with Broadus Erle (violin), Yoko Matsuda (violin), and Aldo Parisot (cello). Their first recording was nominated in 1967 for a Grammy Award. This ensemble is best known for their recordings between 1967 and 1971 of the Late Beethoven quartets. The American Record Guide considered the Yale Quartet's Grammy-nominated recording of the Quartet No. 15 in A minor on YouTube, for example, to be "one of the finest performances of a late Beethoven quartet ever to have been put on record." Schwartz has recorded for CRI, Kapp Records, and Vanguard Recording Society. He has also given world premiere performances of pieces by Mel Powell, Arnold Franchetti, Richmonde Browne, Peter Sculthorpe, and Frank Lewin.

== Teaching career ==
Schwartz was faculty member in the Yale School of Music and Art from 1962–69. He taught numerous master classes in seminar and festival programs, including Swarthmore College (1959), Coe College (1961), Brigham Young University (1959–62 and '64), the University of Hartford (1962–64), the American String Teacher's Association String Seminar, Hartford, CT (1965), and the Experimental Instrumental Performance Clinic, Sarasota, FL (1966–68). In 1970, on the invitation of Mel Powell, he moved his family West to accept a position as a full-time professor of viola at the California Institute of the Arts. He taught there for one year before embarking on a career as a studio musician.

== Studio work ==
After leaving California Institute of the Arts Schwartz became sought after as a studio musician and was principal violist in numerous motion pictures and recordings. His film credits include The Godfather, Jaws, E.T., Close Encounters of the Third Kind and Raiders of the Lost Ark and he served for many years as composer/conductor John Williams' principal violist. He also performed on recordings by many prominent jazz and pop musicians including Frank Sinatra, Johnny Mathis, Bill Evans, Diana Ross and The Supremes, Sérgio Mendes, Lionel Richie and John Hiatt. He was five times voted Most Valuable Player by the National Academy of Recording Arts and Sciences and then received the Emeritus MVP award.

== Professional support for musicians ==
During his later career as a studio musician Schwartz also became active as an officer in various organizations that support professional musicians. He served on the Board of the American Federation of Musicians and Employer's Pension Fund, was Treasurer of Curtis Alumni Association West, and served as Vice President of the Recording Musicians Association of Los Angeles.
