= Not Fade Away: The Complete Studio Recordings and More =

Box set by Buddy Holly
- Released: January 14, 2008
- Recorded: 1956—1969
- Genres: Rock; rockabilly
- Length: 728:01
- Labels: Geffen; Hip-O Select
- Producer: Andy McKaie

Buddy Holly chronology
Greatest Hits (1996)	Not Fade Away: The Complete Studio Recordings and More (2008)	Down the Line: Rarities (2009)

Not Fade Away: The Complete Studio Recordings and More is a box set by the American guitarist Buddy Holly, released in 2008 by Geffen Records and Hip-O Select. It consists of every studio recording Holly ever released as well as early demos, alternate recordings and other recordings from Holly's early days.

== Release and reception ==
Professional ratings
Review scores
Source	Rating
AllMusic	5/5 stars
The Guardian	5/5 stars
Record Collector	5/5 stars
Rolling Stone Germany	5/5 stars
Uncut	2/5 stars

AllMusic critic Stephen Thomas Erlewine opined the box set was "also complete", noting the details are "naturally the things that make Not Fade Away so valuable to hardcore fans and scholars". He concludes by writing, "they give this box weight by providing the connective thread in his music, which in turn illustrates just how monumental his too-short career was". In a BBC Music review, critic Sean Egan commented that it was "arguably the music industry's first ever box set", but calls the set "schizophrenic" in that the set is "predictably gauche and the fidelity of that and at least two of the demos is shockingly musty". He concludes that "Belatedness aside, in their passion and comprehensiveness Hip-O Select have done Holly proud – no mean feat when we are talking about one of popular music's most innovative and inspired artists."

== Track listing ==
Disc one
No.	Title	Length
1.	"My Two-Timin' Woman"	2:16
2.	"I'll Just Pretend"	2:21
3.	"Take These Shackles from My Heart"	1:51
4.	"Footprints in the Snow"	1:20
5.	"Flower of My Heart"	2:36
6.	"Door to My Heart"	2:23
7.	"Soft Place in My Heart"	2:16
8.	"Gotta Get You Near Me Blues"	1:54
9.	"I Gambled My Heart"	2:44
10.	"You and I Are Through"	2:05
11.	"Down the Line"	2:04
12.	"Baby Let's Play House"	2:28
13.	"Down the Line"	2:19
14.	"You and I Are Through"	2:09
15.	"Baby, It's Love"	1:53
16.	"Memories"	2:16
17.	"Queen of the Ballroom"	2:26
18.	"Memories"	2:20
19.	"Moonlight Baby aka Baby, Won't You Come Out Tonight"	1:53
20.	"I Guess I Was Just a Fool"	2:13
21.	"Don't Come Back Knockin'"	2:03
22.	"Love Me"	1:52
23.	"Midnight Shift"	2:12
24.	"Midnight Shift" (false start/alternate take)	2:50
25.	"Don't Come Back Knockin'" (alternate take)	2:34
26.	"Don't Come Back Knockin'"	2:17
27.	"Blue Days, Black Nights"	2:04
28.	"Love Me"	2:08
29.	"Baby Won't You Come Out Tonight"	1:57
30.	"I Guess I Was Just a Fool"	2:17
31.	"It's Not My Fault"	1:21
32.	"I'm Gonna Set My Foot Down"	2:18
33.	"Changin’ All Those Changes"	1:41
34.	"Rock-A-Bye Rock"	2:23
35.	"Because I Love You"	2:40

Disc two
No.	Title	Length
1.	"Rock Around with Ollie Vee"	2:14
2.	"I'm Changin' All These Changes"	2:12
3.	"That'll Be the Day"	2:30
4.	"Girl on My Mind"	2:16
5.	"Ting-A-Ling"	2:47
6.	"Rock Around with Ollie Vee"	2:19
7.	"Modern Don Juan"	2:40
8.	"You Are My Own Desire" (false start)	0:12
9.	"You Are My Own Desire"	2:21
10.	"Gone"	1:16
11.	"Gone"	1:13
12.	"Gone" (alternate take)	1:16
13.	"Have You Ever Been Lonely" (incomplete alternate)	0:54
14.	"Have You Ever Been Lonely" (alternate take)	1:12
15.	"Have You Ever Been Lonely"	1:22
16.	"Brown-Eyed Handsome Man"	2:09
17.	"Good Rockin' Tonight"	1:59
18.	"Rip it Up"	1:25
19.	"Blue Monday"	1:58
20.	"Honky Tonk"	3:27
21.	"Blue Suede Shoes"	1:53
22.	"Shake, Rattle and Roll" (partial)	1:22
23.	"Bo Diddley"	2;18
24.	"Ain't Got No Home"	2:01
25.	"Holly Hop"	1:39
26.	"Brown-Eyed Handsome Man"	2:04
27.	"Bo Diddley"	2:22
28.	"I'm Looking for Someone to Love"	1:58
29.	"That'll Be the Day"	2:17
30.	"Last Night" (undubbed)	1:56
31.	"Maybe Baby" (first version)	2:00
32.	"Words of Love"	1:56
33.	"Mailman, Bring Me No More Blues"	2:13
34.	"Not Fade Away" (alternate overdub)	2:23
35.	"Not Fade Away"	2:22
36.	"Everyday"	2:09

Disc three
No.	Title	Length
1.	"Ready Teddy"	1:33
2.	"Valley of Tears"	2:08
3.	"That'll Be the Day" (greetings to Bob Thiele)	0:34
4.	"That'll Be the Day" (greetings to Murray Deutch)	0:31
5.	"That'll Be the Day" (greetings to Bill Randle)	0:33
6.	"Peggy Sue" (alternate take)	2:33
7.	"Peggy Sue"	2:31
8.	"Listen to Me"	2:22
9.	"Oh Boy" (undubbed)	2:09
10.	"I'm Gonna Love You Too"	2:14
11.	"Send Me Some Lovin'" (undubbed)	2:38
12.	"It's Too Late" (undubbed)	2:24
13.	"Oh Boy"	2:07
14.	"An Empty Cup (And a Broken Date)"	2:13
15.	"Rock Me My Baby"	11:50
16.	"You've Got Love"	2:08
17.	"Maybe Baby"	2:03
18.	"Last Night"	1:15
19.	"Send Me Some Lovin'"	2:36
20.	"It's Too Late"	2:24
21.	"Tell Me How"	2:00
22.	"Little Baby"	1:57
23.	"(You're So Square) Baby I Don't Care"	1:37
24.	"Look at Me"	2:07
25.	"Mona" (rehearsal)	2:07
26.	"Mona" (version 1)	1:14
27.	"Mona" (version 2)	3:25
28.	"Mona" (version 3)	2:44
29.	"Rave On"	1:50
30.	"That's My Desire" (two false starts plus undubbed master)	4:11
31.	"Well... All Right"	2:14
32.	"Fool's Paradise" (alternate take 1)	2:30
33.	"Fool's Paradise" (alternate take 2)	2:33
34.	"Fool's Paradise" (alternate take 3)	2:32

Disc four
No.	Title	Length
1.	"Think it Over" (false start and rehearsal take)	2:16
2.	"Think it Over" (undubbed alternate)	1:51
3.	"Think it Over" (undubbed master)	1:50
4.	"Take Your Time" (false start and alternate take)	3:32
5.	"Take Your Time"	1:57
6.	"Fool's Paradise"	2:31
7.	"Think it Over"	1:49
8.	"Lonesome Tears"	1:48
9.	"It's So Easy"	2:11
10.	"Heartbeat"	2:10
11.	"Love's Made a Fool of Yourself" (undubbed)	2:05
12.	"Early in the Morning"	2:08
13.	"Now We're One" (fragmment)	0:15
14.	"Now We're One"	2:05
15.	"Come Back Baby"	1:48
16.	"Reminiscing" (undubbed)	2:01
17.	"True Love Waits" (mono mix)	2:49
18.	"True Love Waits" (stereo mix)	2:52
19.	"It Doesn't Matter Anymore" (mono)	2:05
20.	"It Doesn't Matter Anymore" (stereo)	2:06
21.	"Raining in My Heart" (mono)	2:48
22.	"Raining in My Heart" (stereo)	2:50
23.	"Moondreams" (mono)	2:40
24.	"Moondreams" (stereo)	2:42
25.	"You're the One"	1:35
26.	"That's What They Say" (w/fragment)	1:52
27.	"What to Do"	1:55
28.	"Peggy Sue Got Married"	1:50
29.	"That Makes it Tough"	2:18
30.	"Crying, Waiting, Hoping"	1:52
31.	"Learning the Game"	1:35
32.	"Wait 'Till the Sun Shines, Nellie"	1:15

Disc five
No.	Title	Length
1.	"Slippin' and Slidin'" (slow version #1)	3:13
2.	"Slippin' and Slidin'" (slow version #2)	3:34
3.	"Slippin' and Slidin'" (fast version)	1:28
4.	"Drown in My Own Tears" (rehearsal)/"Buddy and Marie Elena Taking in Apartment"	3:39
5.	"Dearest" (alternate take)	1:14
6.	"Dearest"	1:53
7.	"Untitled instrumental" (also known as "Buddy's Guitar". Listed as "Tremolo Instrumental")	1:20
8.	"Love is Strange"	1:47
9.	"Smokey Joe's Cafe"	2:16
10.	"Peggy Sue Got Married"	2:07
11.	"Crying, Waiting, Hoping"	2:15
12.	"That's What They Say" (version 2)	2:13
13.	"What to Do"	1:56
14.	"Learning the Game"	2:12
15.	"That Makes it Tough"	2:27
16.	"Baby Won't You Come Out Tonight"	1:54
17.	"Because I Love You"	2:40
18.	"Changin' All These Changes"	1:44
19.	"I'm Gonna Set My Foot Down"	2:18
20.	"It's Not My Fault"	1:52
21.	"Rock-A-Bye Rock"	2:24
22.	"Brown-Eyed Handsome Man"	2:05
23.	"Bo Diddley"	2:22
24.	"What to Do"	1:55
25.	"Peggy Sue Got Married"	1:51
26.	"Crying, Waiting, Hoping"	2:06
27.	"That Makes it Tough"	2:19
28.	"That's What They Say"	2:17
29.	"Learning the Game"	2:02
30.	"Reminiscing"	1:56
31.	"Wait 'Till the Sun Shines Nellie"	1:55
32.	"Dearest" (version 3)	1:53
33.	"Slippin' and Slidin'" (slow version 2)	3:31

Disc six
No.	Title	Length
1.	"Baby Let's Play House (I Wanna Play House with You)"	2:22
2.	"Down the Line"	2:04
3.	"Wait 'Till the Sun Shines Nellie" (overdub version 2)	1:56
4.	"Reminiscing"	1:56
5.	"Flower of My Heart"	2:35
6.	"Door to My Heart"	2:23
7.	"Soft Place in My Heart"	2:16
8.	"I Gambled My Heart"	2:42
9.	"Gotta Get You Into Me Blues"	1:54
10.	"Gone" (version 3)	1:12
11.	"Rip It Up"	1:28
12.	"Honky Tonk"	3:28
13.	"Blue Suede Shoes"	1:54
14.	"Shake, Rattle and Roll"	1:23
15.	"You and I Are Through"	2:06
16.	"Baby It's Love"	1:52
17.	"Memories"	2:15
18.	"Queen of the Ballroom"	2:22
19.	"Love's Made a Fool of You"	2:02
20.	"Wishing" (mono)	2:03
21.	"Wishing" (stereo)	2:03
22.	"Maybe Baby"	1:56
23.	"That's My Desire"	2:27
24.	"Have You Ever Been Lonely" (version 1)	1:27
25.	"Good Rockin' Tonight"	2:02
26.	"Blue Monday"	2:03
27.	"Ain't Got No Home"	2:05
28.	"Holly Hop"	1:44
29.	"Slippin' and Slidin'"	2:35
30.	"You're the One"	2:05
31.	"Love is Strange"	3:06
32.	"(Ummmm, Oh Yeah) Dearest"	1:54
33.	"Smokey Joe's Cafe"	2:15

== Personnel ==
According to the liner notes of the box set:

- Buddy Holly – guitars, mandolin, vocals
- Abby Hoffer – backing vocals
- Abraham Richman – tenor saxophone
- Al Caiola – guitar
- Al Chernet – guitar
- Andrew Ackers – piano
- Bill Pickering – backing vocals
- Bo Clarke – drums
- Bob Lapham – backing vocals
- Bob Montgomery – guitar, vocals
- C.W. Kendall – piano
- Clifford Leeman – drums
- David Bigham – backing vocals
- David Schwartz – viola
- Don Guess – bass, steel guitar
- Donald Amone – guitars
- Doris Johnson – harp
- Doug Kirkham – percussion
- Doug Roberts – drums
- Elbert Raymond "Dutch" McMillin – alto saxophone
- Eric Budd – drums
- Ernest Hayes – piano
- Farris Coursey – drums
- Floyd Cramer – piano
- Gary Tollet – background vocals
- George Atwood – bass
- George Barnes – guitar
- George Tomsco – guitars
- Grady Martin – guitars
- Harold Bradley – guitar
- Harriet Young – backing vocals
- Helen Way – backing vocals
- Herbert Bourne – violin
- Howard Kay – viola
- Irving Spice – violin
- Jerry Allison – cardboard box, cymbals, drums, acoustic guitar, vocals
- Joe Mauldin – bass
- John Pickering – backing vocals
- Julius Held – violin
- Keith McCormack – rhythm guitar
- King Curtis – tenor saxophone
- Larry Welborn – bass
- Leo Kruczek – violin
- Leonard Posner – violin
- Lynn Bailey – bass
- Maeretha Stewart – backing vocals
- Maurice Bialkin – cello
- Maurice Brown – cello
- Merril Ostrus – backing vocals
- Niki Sullivan – guitars, vocals
- Norman Petty – organ, piano
- Panama Francis – drums
- Paul Winter – violin
- Phil Kraus – drums
- Ramona Tollet – backing vocals
- Ray Free – violin
- Ray Rush – backing vocals
- Robert Bollinger – backing vocals
- Robert Harter – backing vocals
- Robert Linville – backing vocals
- Sam "The Man" Taylor – alto saxophone
- Sanford Bloch – bass
- Slim Corben – handclaps
- Sonny Curtis – fiddle, guitar
- Stan Lark – bass
- Sylvan Shulman – violin
- The Picks – backing vocals
- The Ray Charles Singers – backing vocals
- The Roses – backing vocals
- Theresa Merritt – backing vocals
- Tommy Allsup – guitar
- Vi Petty – celeste, piano
- Waylon Jennings – handclapping
- William Marine – backing vocals

== Charts ==
Weekly chart performance for Not Fade Away
Chart (2008)	Peak position
US Billboard 200	101
US Independent Albums (Billboard)	12
