= Elizabeth Sawyer Parisot =

American pianist

Elizabeth Sawyer Parisot is an American pianist. She has performed in solo and chamber music concerts worldwide at venues including Carnegie Hall, Alice Tully Hall, and Queen Elizabeth Hall. Parisot has collaborated with a number of prominent instrumentalists and vocalists, including Aldo Parisot, Yo-Yo Ma, János Starker, Ralph Kirshbaum, Carter Brey, Hu Nai-Yuan, William Preucil, and David Shifrin. Parisot is particularly well-known for her work with cellists, and in 2007 she was awarded the title “Grande Dame du Violoncelle” in 2007 by the Eva Janzer Memorial Cello Center at Indiana University.

Since 1977, she has been a professor of piano at the Yale School of Music. Her students have performed at Carnegie Hall, Lincoln Center, and the Kennedy Center, among others.

She was married to the late Brazilian cellist Aldo Parisot, who was himself a faculty member at the Yale School of Music, for 52 years. The two toured and performed extensively as a duo, and they released a recording of the Brahms cello sonatas on the Musical Heritage Society label in 1974. Elizabeth Sawyer Parisot has numerous other recordings to her credit, including contributions to a complete compendium of Ezra Laderman's compositions.

Each year, the "Elizabeth Parisot Prize" is awarded at the Yale School of Music's Convocation to outstanding pianists who are graduating. Past recipients include Rachel Cheung and Dominic Cheli.
