= Yuri Liberzon =

Classical guitarist

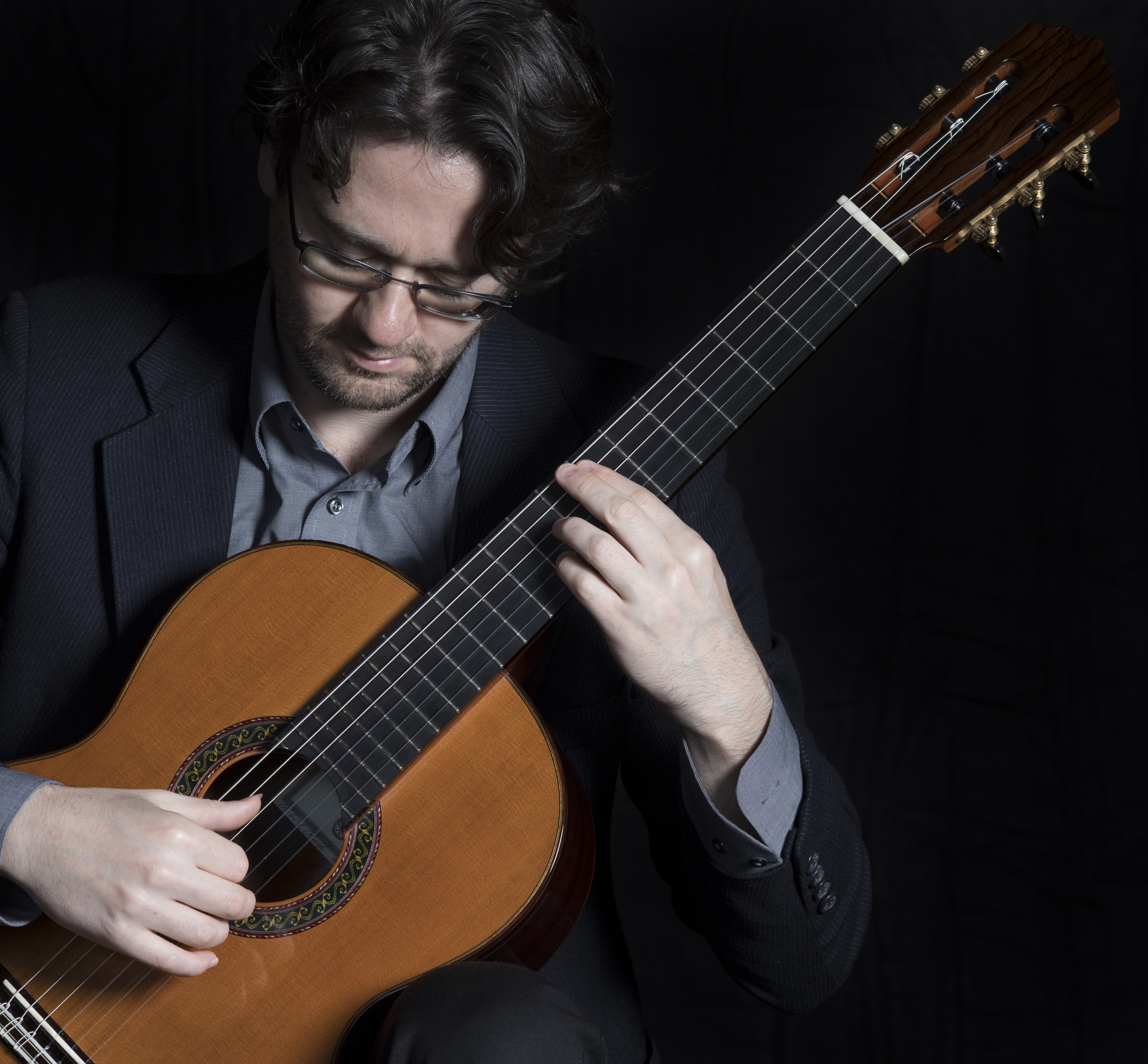

Background information
- Born: 1982 (age 43–44); Novosibirsk, Russia
- Genres: Classical
- Occupation: Musician
- Instrument: Classical Guitar
- Years active: 2000s–present
- Labels: Naxos, Soundset
- Website: Official website

Yuri Liberzon (born 1982) is a classical guitarist based in the United States. Born in Russia, he lived in Israel, studying with Yaron Hasson, before moving to the United States. He studied at the Peabody Conservatory with world-famous guitarist Manuel Barrueco and at the Yale School of Music with Benjamin Verdery. Mr. Liberzon was granted Alien of Extraordinary Ability United States Permanent Residency based on his achievements in the music field.

== Career ==
Liberzon has performed at prestigious concert series both internationally and across the United States. He has appeared in the Marlow Guitar Series and is featured on their Marlow Guitar Series Favorites CD. Liberzon has performed Joaquín Rodrigo's Concierto de Aranjuez with the Diablo Symphony. He has also performed with flamenco guitarist Grisha Goryachev for the Sacramento Guitar Society.

He has performed and given masterclasses at universities including Portland State University. He has also appeared for numerous guitar societies, such as the South Bay Guitar Society. and the Orange County Guitar Circle. He has served as a professor of guitar at Stanislaus State University.

Liberzon has also made transcriptions of J.S. Bach violin Partitas and Domenico Scarlatti Sonatas, published by Bergmann Edition.

His debut album, Ascension (2015), includes transcriptions of works by Johann Sebastian Bach and Keith Jarrett. The recording was submitted for first-round GRAMMY consideration.

== Discography ==
- Ascension (2017) – Soundset Recordings. Engineered by Grammy-winning Nahuel Bronzini.
- ¡Acentuado! (2018) – Soundset Recordings. Engineered by Nahuel Bronzini.
- 3 Violin Sonatas (2020) – Laudable Records. Engineered by Nahuel Bronzini.
- Music of Konstantin Vassiliev (2022, Naxos) – with Patrick O'Connell. Engineered by Grammy-winning Norbert Kraft.
- Piazzolla: Music for Guitar (2024, Naxos) – with Piotr Pakhomkin. Engineered by Norbert Kraft. Features arrangements of works by Ástor Piazzolla, including the Tango Suite for two guitars. In a July 2025 review for *Fanfare*, music critic Peter Burwasser praised their performance, writing it is “enriched by the compelling textures that result from the use of two guitars,” and that “Yuri Liberzon and his guest partner Piotr Pakhomkin, both superb technicians, make the most of the delightfully dense patterns of the score.”
