= Esteban Benzecry =

Argentine composer (born 1970)

Esteban Benzecry (born 1970) is an Argentine classical composer.

== Early years ==
Benzecry was born in Lisbon, Portugal, in 1970 to Argentine parents. He grew up in Argentina where he studied musical composition with Sergio Hualpa and Haydee Gerardi. He moved to Paris in 1997, where he studied composition with Jacques Charpentier, Professor of the Conservatoire Superieur de Paris. He obtained the "Premier Prix a l'unanimitè" in composition in 1999. He also studied composition with Paul Méfano, and Electro acoustic music with Luis Naón and Laurent Cuniot. He became a French citizen in 2011.

== Career ==
In 1992 he was named "The young revelation of the Season" by the Musical Critics Association of Argentina. The same association awarded him with the prize "The best Argentine work premiered in the Season 1994, 2006, 2009, 2017". He has been a fellow of the Interamerican Music Friends of Washington (USA), Mozarteum Argentino, and Academie des Beaux-Arts de l'Institut de France. In 1995 he was invited as Resident Composer at the Yehudi Menuhin Academy (Switzerland).

The Academie des Beaux-Arts de l'Institut de France awarded him the prize from the Foundation Delmas in 1999, the prize Tronchet in 2002, and the prize Georges Wildenstein in 2006. In 2004, he received the Fondation groupe d’entreprise Natexis Banques Populaires Award for music. He is Resident Composer at the Casa de Velazquez of Madrid for 2004–2006 (Academie de France a Madrid). In 2008 he received a Guggenheim Fellowship for Music Composition. In 2019 he receives the Konex Platinum award as the best composer of the decade in Argentina.

== Compositions ==
He has written three symphonies. His first symphony, "El compendio de la vida" (1993) was inspired by four of his own canvases. He has also written other symphonic and chamber works. His most recent works attempt a fusion between rhythms with Latin American roots and the diverse aesthetic currents of European contemporary music creating a personal language, an imaginary folklore.

Le Monde de la musique has called him a distant heir to Villa-Lobos and Ginastera because of his imaginative use of the Latin-American musical patrimony.

== Performances ==
His works have been played in Europe and the United States. Among the interpreters that have performed his works are: The Royal Concertgebouw Orchestra, New York Philharmonic, Los Angeles Philharmonic, Philadelphia Orchestra, Atlanta Symphony Orchestra, Dallas Symphony Orchestra, Fort Worth Symphony Orchestra, Minnesota Orchestra, Gothenburg Symphony Orchestra, Sydney Symphony Orchestra, Helsinki Philharmonic, Tampere Philharmonic, Stavanger Symfoniorkester, Deutsche Radio Philharmonie, Hamburg Philharmoniker Orchester, Orquesta Gulbenkian of Lisbon, Orquesta Nacional de España, Orquesta Sinfonica de RTVE (Radio Televisión Española), Orchestre National de France, Orchestre Philharmonique de Radio France, Orchestre National de Montpellier, Orchestre Colonne de Paris, Orchestre de Concerts Pasdeloup, Orchestre Lamoureux, Orchestre Symphonique de Cannes-Côte d’Azur, la Sinfonietta de Paris, Orchestre de la Basse Normandie, Orchestre Universitaire de Strasbourg, l’ensemble l’Itineraire, Grup Instrumental de Valencia, Ensamble LIM, Orquesta Sinfonica National de Argentine, Orquesta Filarmonica del Teatro Colón de Buenos Aires, Orquesta Sinfónica Simón Bolívar de Venezuela, Orquesta Filarmonica Nacional de Venezuela, Orquesta Nacional de Colombia, Orquesta Filarmonica de Bogota (Colombia), Orquesta Sinfonica de Chile, Orquesta Sinfónica Nacional (Peru), l’Ensemble de l’Université Carnegie-Mellon de Pittsburgh (USA), Orchestre Symphonique de Klaipėda (Lituanie), Orquesta Sinfonica Carlos Chavez (Mexique) la Camerata Lysy – Gstaad (Suisse), la Camerata Basel (Suisse), la Camerata Bariloche (Argentine), “London’s Schubert Chamber Orchestra” (UK), Unitas Ensemble – Boston – USA, Filarmónica de Stat Targu Mures (Rumania), Kyiv Chamber Orchestra, Zaporizhzhya Symphony Orchestra, Kharkiv Philharmonic Orchestra (Ukraine), Solaris String Quartet.

His works have also been performed by renowned artists such as Gustavo Dudamel, Miguel Harth-Bedoya, Giancarlo Guerrero, Diego Matheuz, Manuel Lopez Gomez, David Alan Miller, Simone Young, Enrique Diemecke, Pablo Boggiano, Laurent Petitgirard, Alain Altinoglu, Daniel Kawka, Wolfgang Doerner, Mark Foster, Alain Pâris, Nemanja Radulovic, Rolf Schulte, Alberto Lysy, Gautier Capuçon, Sol Gabetta, Jesús Castro-Balbi, Sergio Tiempo, Horacio Lavandera, Anaïs Gaudemard, Marielle Nordmann, Ayako Tanaka among others.

His works have been performed at Carnegie Hall in New York, Lincoln Center (also in New York), Walt Disney Concert Hall in Los Angeles, Davies Symphony Hall in San Francisco, Sydney Opera House, the Concertgebouw in Amsterdam, the Royal Festival Hall in London, Philharmonie de Paris, Salle Pleyel, Salle Gaveau, Théâtre des Champs-Élysées, Théâtre Mogador, Maison de Radio France, Palais de l'Unesco de París, Palais des Festivals a Cannes, Opéra de Montpellier, Sydney Opera House, Teatro Colón de Buenos Aires, Auditorio Nacional de Madrid, Festival Rencontres d'ensembles de violoncelles de Beauvais, Concours International d'harpe Lily Laskine, Juilliard School in New York, Bard Music Festival – NY – USA, Boston Conservatory, Festival Présences de Radio France, Festival Pontino d'Italie, Festivals of Brighton and Dartington (England), Festival de Música de Islas Canarias, Festival Estoril de Portugal, Miso Music Portugal, Festival Musica Viva de Lisboa, Festival Ensems de Valencia, Festival de Morelia (Mexico), Carlos Prieto International Cello Competition – Morelia, Mexico, Festival Latinoamericano de Música de Caracas, Festival Iberoamericano de Puerto Rico, Museo Guggenheim de Bilbao, Festival BBK, Van Cliburn Foundation of Fort Worth, Concours international de piano d'Orléans, Busoni International Piano Competition.

== Selected works ==
Orchestra

- Symphony No. 1 "El compendio de la vida" (Life's Abridgement) (1993)
- Obertura Tanguera (Hommage a Ástor Piazzolla) (1993)
- Symphony No. 2 (1996)
- Symphony No. 3 "Preludio a un nuevo milenio" (1999)
- Inti Raymi (La Fiesta del Sol de los Incas) (2001, commissioned by Musique Nouvelle en Liberté – Orchestre Colonne)
- Colores de la cruz del sur (2002, commissioned by Radio France – Orchestre National de France)
- Rituales Amerindios (2008, commissioned by Gothenburg Symphony – Swedish National Orchestra).
- Pre-Columbian Tryptic for Orchestra.
  - I – Ehécatl ( Azteca wind god)
  - II – Chaac ( Maya water god)
  - III – Illapa (Inca thunderclap god)
- Fantasia Mastay (2009, commissioned by the Los Angeles Philharmonic Association, music director Gustavo Dudamel)
- Clarinet concerto (2010, commissioned by the FESNOJIV Fundación del Estado para el Sistema Nacional de las Orquestas Juveniles e Infantiles de Venezuela)
- De otros cielos, otros mares... for chorus and orchestra (2011, commissioned by Orquesta y Coro de la Comunidad de Madrid).

String orchestra

- Sinfonietta Americana
- Scherzo Latino-américaine
- Mosaïque Sudaméricaine
- Quintet à cordes

Concertante

- Adagio Fantastico for violin, viola and string orchestra (1993)
- Concertino for cello and string orchestra
- Evocation d'un rêve for violin and orchestra (2005)
- Evocation d'un monde perdu for violin and orchestra (2007)
- Evocation of a lost world for violin and Chamber orchestra (2008)
- La lumière de Pacha Caman, Concerto for cello and ensemble of cellos (2000)
- Paisaje nocturne for violin and string orchestra (1994)
- Paisaje nocturne for violin and string orchestra (new version 2003)
- Concerto for violin and orchestra (2005–2007)

Large ensemble (6 or more players)

- Présage de l'Aube
- Rituales de la cruz del sur for 6 percussionists
- Tres Mitos Andinos for 10 instruments (2004)
- La sombra del Toro Rojo for 11 instruments (2005)
- Como una luz desde el infinito (Homenaje a Arriaga) for 7 instruments (2005)
- Huenu Leufu (Rio del Cielo) for 8 instruments (2006)
- Pillan Quitral – El Fuego Sagrado for 15 instruments (2006)

Chamber music

- Introduccion y Capricho for violin solo
- Toccata y Misterio for cello and piano
- Trio for piano, violin and cello
- Capricho "Sermoneta" for violin solo
- Rapsodie for clarinet and piano
- "Inti" Rapsodia for flute and piano
- Quatre pièces petites for bassoon solo
- Rapsodia Andina for cello and piano
- Viento Norte for flute solo
- Pièce for clarinet solo
- Suite "Prisme du Sud" for cello solo
- Alwa for harp
- Horizontes inexplorados for harp
- String Quintet

Piano

- Tres microclimas
- Toccata Newén

== Recordings ==
- El compendio de la Vida Editions Cosentino (IRCO 299) Orchestral Works. "El Compendio de la Vida" (Symphony n°1) – "Obertura Tanguera"- "Concertino for cello and string orchestra "- "Sinfonietta Americana".
- Rapsodia Latina music for cello and piano – Lin/Castro-Balbi Duo, Toccata y Misterio, Rapsodia Andina
- Con Arriaga en su segundo centenario CD Homenaje a Arriaga – Colección Fundación BBK n°14
- XXX Aniversario LIM "Como una luz desde el infinito" para ensamble. Dirección: Jesús Villa Rojo LIM CD 020
- Horacio Lavandera CD & DVD "Compositores Argentinos "Toccata Newén" para piano.
- The Secret Garden – Noël Wan, harp "Alwa" for harp.
- SUR – Fort Worth Symphony Orchestra, Miguel Harth Bedoya, Conductor Colores de la Cruz del Sur" for Orchestra.

– FWSO LIVE – Caminos del Inka – Filarmonika Publishing
