= Cello Concerto No. 2 (Villa-Lobos) =

- by Heitor Villa-Lobos
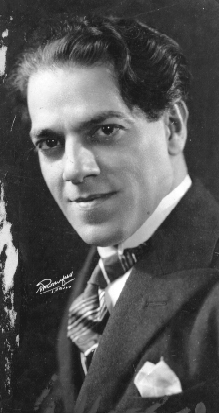
- Villa-Lobos, c. 1922
- Catalogue: W516
- Composed: 1953
- Dedication: Aldo Parisot
- Performed: 5 February 1955
- Movements: 4

The Cello Concerto No. 2, W516, was composed by Heitor Villa-Lobos in Rio de Janeiro in 1953. It was commissioned by the cellist Aldo Parisot, to whom the score is dedicated. A reduction for cello and piano was published in Paris by Max Eschig.

The concerto was first performed by Parisot with the New York Philharmonic conducted by Walter Hendl on 5 February 1955.

The orchestra calls for piccolo, two flutes, two oboes, cor anglais, two clarinets, bass clarinet, two bassoons, contrabassoon, four horns, two trumpets, three trombones, tuba, timpani, percussion (tam-tam, side drum, tambourine, suspended cymbal), celesta, harp, and strings. The work is in four movements:

1. Allegro non troppo
2. Molto andante cantabile
3. Scherzo: Vivace – Cadenza
4. Allegro energico
