= Moni Simeonov =

Moni Simeonov is a Bulgarian violinist.

== Education ==
Moni Simeonov was born in Plovdiv, Bulgaria in a family of musicians. His father was a cellist while his mother was a pianist. Simeonov's grandmother was a pianist, and his grandfather was a choir conductor. He started playing violin at the age of five and by the age of 15 immigrated to the United States with a full scholarship to the Idyllwild Arts Academy in California. When he graduated from Idyllwild, he became an attendee of the Eastman School of Music where he got his bachelor's degree in violin after studying it with Zvi Zeitlin on full scholarship. During his time in Eastman, he performed on Antonio Stradivari of 1714. Since moving to California, he has performed with the Los Angeles Philharmonic, Los Angeles Chamber Orchestra, Opera and Master Chorale, Ensemble San Francisco and as concertmaster with the Sacramento Philharmonic Orchestra.

Simeonov obtained his Artist Diploma from the Yale School of Music, and following it completed his master's degree in Music with Ani Kavafian at the same place. While at Yale, he served as concertmaster for the Yale Philharmonia Orchestra and New Music Ensemble. He continued his education at the USC Thornton School of Music where he earned his graduate certificate degree and Doctorate studying under Midori. Aside from majors, Simeonov holds minors in Schenkerian analysis, viola performance, Japanese language, and explored the interpretation of the Balkan folk music.

== Career ==
In addition to his formal studies, Simeonov has attended the Music Academy of the West, Pacific Music Festival, Tanglewood and Oregon Bach Festivals.

In 2014 he became a Director of String Studies and Violin Professor with the Bob Cole Conservatory of Music at the California State University, Long Beach and he is the Edelman Chair of Chamber Music with the Colburn School of Music in Los Angeles. His students have won gold medals at the Coltman and St. Paul Chamber Music Competitions as well as multiple prizes at the Fischoff Chamber Music Competition and have performed at Chamber Music Society of Lincoln Center. As of 2019 he served as a faculty of the Singapore Violin Festival, Atlantic Music Festival, the Hawaii Chamber Music Festival, the Texas Music Festival, the Interlochen Arts Academy. His performances can be heard on various TV and radio programs such as Bulgarian National Radio, KUSC, NHK, NPR, and PBS. Moni Simeonov is the creator of the online tool for teaching violin technique and orchestra audition excerpts www.zenviolin.com.
