= Jesús Castro-Balbi =

American musical artist and academic (born 1970)

- Born: 1975 (age 50–51); Alicante, Spain
- Genres: Classical
- Occupations: Cellist, Educator, Administrator
- Instrument: Cello
- Years active: fl. ca. 1992-present
- Website: http://www.jesuscastrobalbi.com

Jesús Castro-Balbi (born 1975) is an American cellist and teacher. In 2021, Castro-Balbi joined Kennesaw State University in metro Atlanta.

== Early life and education ==
Of Peruvian heritage and raised in France, Jesús Castro-Balbi graduated from the Conservatoire de Lyon, Indiana University Bloomington, the Yale School of Music, and holds a Doctor of Musical Arts degree from The Juilliard School. His mentors include Iseut Chuat, Marc Coppey, Jean Deplace, Aldo Parisot, Janos Starker, and members of the Amadeus, Borodine, Juilliard, Ravel, and Tokyo String Quartets.

== Career ==
Castro-Balbi served as a professor at Texas Christian University School of Music from 2003 through 2021. He also served as the founding artistic director of the TCU Cellofest and of the Faculty & Friends Chamber Music Series.

As a member of the 2018–19 cohort of American Council on Education Fellows, he developed higher education leadership capacity with the senior executive at the University of Miami.

In 2021, he joined Kennesaw State University, where is a professor of music and has held a variety of administrative posts.

=== Performance ===
Castro-Balbi has collaborated in chamber music with Arkady Fomin, David Korevaar, Henning Kraggerud, Gloria Lin and Michael Shih, and as a member of the Caminos del Inka String Quartet, the Clavier Trio, and the Lin / Castro-Balbi Duo.

Castro-Balbi performs new music, including Osvaldo Golijov's Azul and Arlington Jones’ Soul Unity Suite to Lutoslawski's cello concerto. He has presented 71 premiere performances, the world premiere recording of 20 works. He is the dedicatee of 29 compositions, including works by Esteban Benzecry, Martin Blessinger, Fang Dongqing, Blaise Ferrandino, Kotaro Kobayashi, Till Meyn, Octavio Vázquez, Hailey Woodrow, and Samuel Zyman. Other highlights include the New York premiere of Mark-Anthony Turnage’s Cello Concerto Kai, the first recording of the complete music for cello and piano by Robert Rodriguez, and the premieres, with Germán Gutiérrez and the TCU Symphony Orchestra, of Edgar Valcárcel’s Concerto Indio and Jimmy López’s cello concerto, Lord of the Air, and the subsequent recording of the latter for Harmonia Mundi with the Norwegian Radio Orchestra led by Miguel Harth-Bedoya.

=== Honors and awards ===
- Gold Medal in Cello Performance, Conservatoire National de Région, Lyon, France, 1992
- Gold Medal in Chamber Music, Conservatoire National de Région, Lyon, France, 1992
- First Prize, First Chamber Music Competition, Guidel, France, 1994
- First Prize, Conservatoire National Supérieur de Musique, Lyon, France, 1995
- First Prize, European Chamber Music Competition, Privas, France, 1996
- Aldo Parisot Prize, Yale University, Connecticut, 1999
- Winner, Woolsey Hall Concerto Competition, Yale University, Connecticut, 1999
- First Prize, Carlos Prieto Latin American Cello Competition, Mexico, 2000
- Winner, Cello Concerto Competition, Verbier Academy, Switzerland, 2000
- Victor Elmaleh Prize, Concert Artist Guild, New York, New York, 2003
- Salon de Virtuosi – Schwartz Foundation Award, New York, New York, 2004
- Deans' Research and Creativity Award, TCU, 2008
- College of Fine Arts Award for Distinguished Achievement as a Creative Teacher and Scholar, TCU, 2012
- Commendation "in Recognition of Contributions and Support to the Central Conservatory of Music's Mission and to Furthering Education in Cello Performance." Beijing, China, 2012

== Discography ==
- The Music of Ezra Laderman, Vol. 4. Laderman's Simões (world premiere recording) with the Yale Cellos, Aldo Parisot, conductor. Albany Records, 2001. TROY454
- Aprieto. Samuel Zyman Suite for Two Cellos (world premiere recording). Compact disc recording with Carlos Prieto. Urtext Digital Classics, 2002.
- Anthony Newman: Chamber Music. Anthony Newman Sonata for Cello and Piano (world premiere recording), with the composer at the piano. 930 Records, 2003.
- Relax for Power with Hazel Gordon Lucas. Compact disc recording including works for cello and harp with Laura Logan: Debussy Beau Soir, Fauré Après un rêve, Jules Massenet Méditation, from Thaïs and Saint-Saëns Le Cygne. 2004.
- Passion and Glory. Compact disc recording with the Clavier Trio. Bedřich Smetana Trio in G Minor, Op. 15, and Brahms Trio in C Major, Op. 87. Clavier Trio, 2006.
- Anthony Newman: Complete Works for Cello and Piano. Re-release of Anthony Newman: Chamber Music (930 Records, 2003). 930 Records, 2006.
- Rapsodia Latina. Compact disc recording with the Lin / Castro-Balbi Duo (Gloria Lin, piano). Marlos Nobre Desafio II, Op. 31 No. 2bis; William Bolcom Gingando: Brazilian Tango Tempo; and the world premiere recordings of Esteban Benzecry Toccata y Misterio and Rapsodia Andina; Gabriela Frank Manhattan Serenades; Marlos Nobre Poema III, Op. 94 No. 3; Manuel Ponce Lejos de ti; Luis Sandi Sonatina; and Joaquin Silva-Diaz Serenata. Filarmonika, 2007. FILA 0102.
- Conversation with Bill Lively. DVD featuring music performed by Clavier Trio. In KERA Art & Seek. North Texas Public Broadcasting Inc., 2008.
- Robert Xavier Rodriguez: Chamber Works. Compact disc recording with the Clavier Trio et al. Trio II and of Sor(tri)lege: Trio III (world premiere recordings). Albany Records, 2009. TROY1136.
- Transfigured Night. Compact disc recording with the Clavier Trio. Arnold Schönberg's Verklärte Nacht and Sergei Rachmaninov's Trio Elégiaque in D Minor, Op. 9. Clavier Trio, 2010.
- Vienna and Café Music. Compact disc recording with the Clavier Trio. Joseph Haydn Trio in C major, Hob. XV:27; Johannes Brahms Trio in B Major, Op. 8; and Paul Schoenfield's Café Music. Clavier Trio, 2012.
- Contemporary Art Music in Texas. Martin Blessinger The Paul Bunyan Suite (selections). Compact disc recording with Gloria Lin. Produced by International Society for Contemporary Music. Stephen F. Austin State U. Press, 2012.
- Robert Rodriguez: Complete Music for Cello and Piano. Compact disc recording with Gloria Lin, piano. Tentado por la Samba (world premiere recording), Máscaras (world premiere recording), Ursa (world premiere recording), Favola I (world premiere recording) and Lull-A-Bear (world premiere recording). Albany Records, 2012. TROY1355.
- Apuntes Sobre La Historia De La Música En México: Obras Mexicanas Para Violonchelo. Samuel Zyman Suite for Two Cellos (selections). Compact disc recording with Carlos Prieto. Re-release from Aprieto (Urtext Digital Classics, 2001). Seminario de Cultura Mexicana, 2013.
- Norwegian Radio Orchestra, Miguel Harth-Bedoya, conductor. Jimmy Lopez The Lord of the Air: Cello Concerto (world premiere recording). Harmonia Mundi, recorded April 2014.
