= Piotr Pakhomkin =

Russian-American classical guitarist (born 1985)

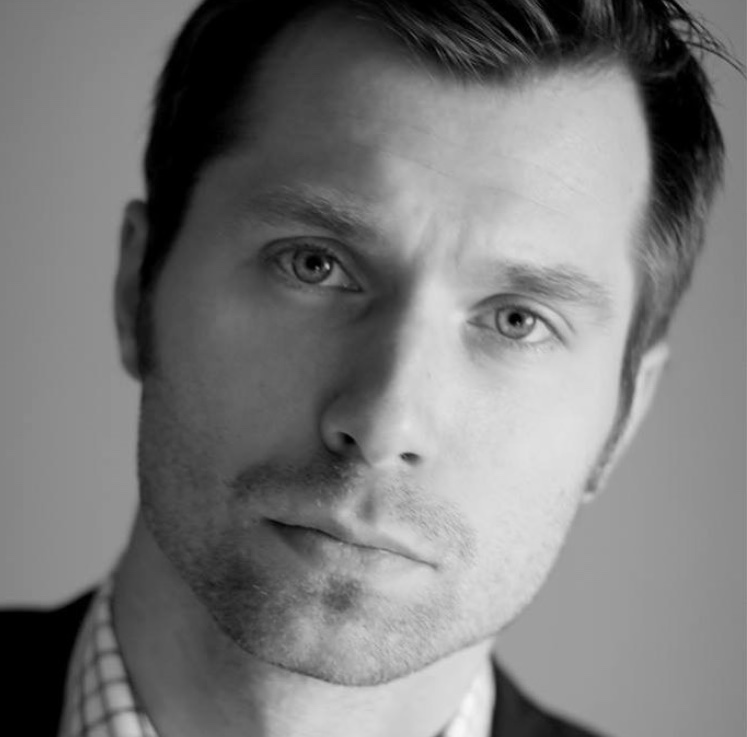

Background information
- Born: Piotr Victor Pakhomkin; 1985 (age 40–41); Saint Petersburg, Russia
- Genres: Classical
- Occupation: Musician
- Instrument: Classical guitar

Piotr (Peter) Pakhomkin (born 1985) is a Russian-American classical guitarist who has performed at Carnegie Hall and given performances and masterclasses throughout Europe, Central and Northern America.

== Early life ==
Pakhomkin was born in Saint Petersburg Russia and moved to Maryland in the United States in 1991. His first classical guitar teacher was Paul Moeller who prepared him for university studies in classical guitar. Pakhomkin earned his master's degree from Johns Hopkins University Peabody Institute and studied directly under Manuel Barrueco for six years. Pakhomkin was featured in Aaron Shearer: A Life With the Guitar, a production of Michael Lawrence Films.

== Career ==
Pakhomkin took home First Prize from the 2012 Mexican International Guitar Competition in Culiacan and top prizes from the Boston GuitarFest International Guitar Competition, the Great Lakes Guitar Competition, the Montreal International Guitar Competition, and the European International Guitar Competition, “Enrico Mercatali” in Italy.

In 2014, Pakhomkin became a Strathmore Artist-in-Residence. After completing his residency he returned and continues to serve as a faculty member, performer and mentor in the Strathmore Institute for Artistic Development.

Pakhomkin won the 2016 Respighi International Soloist Competition and made his Carnegie Hall debut with the Chamber Orchestra of New York's "Masterwork Series" in June 2018.

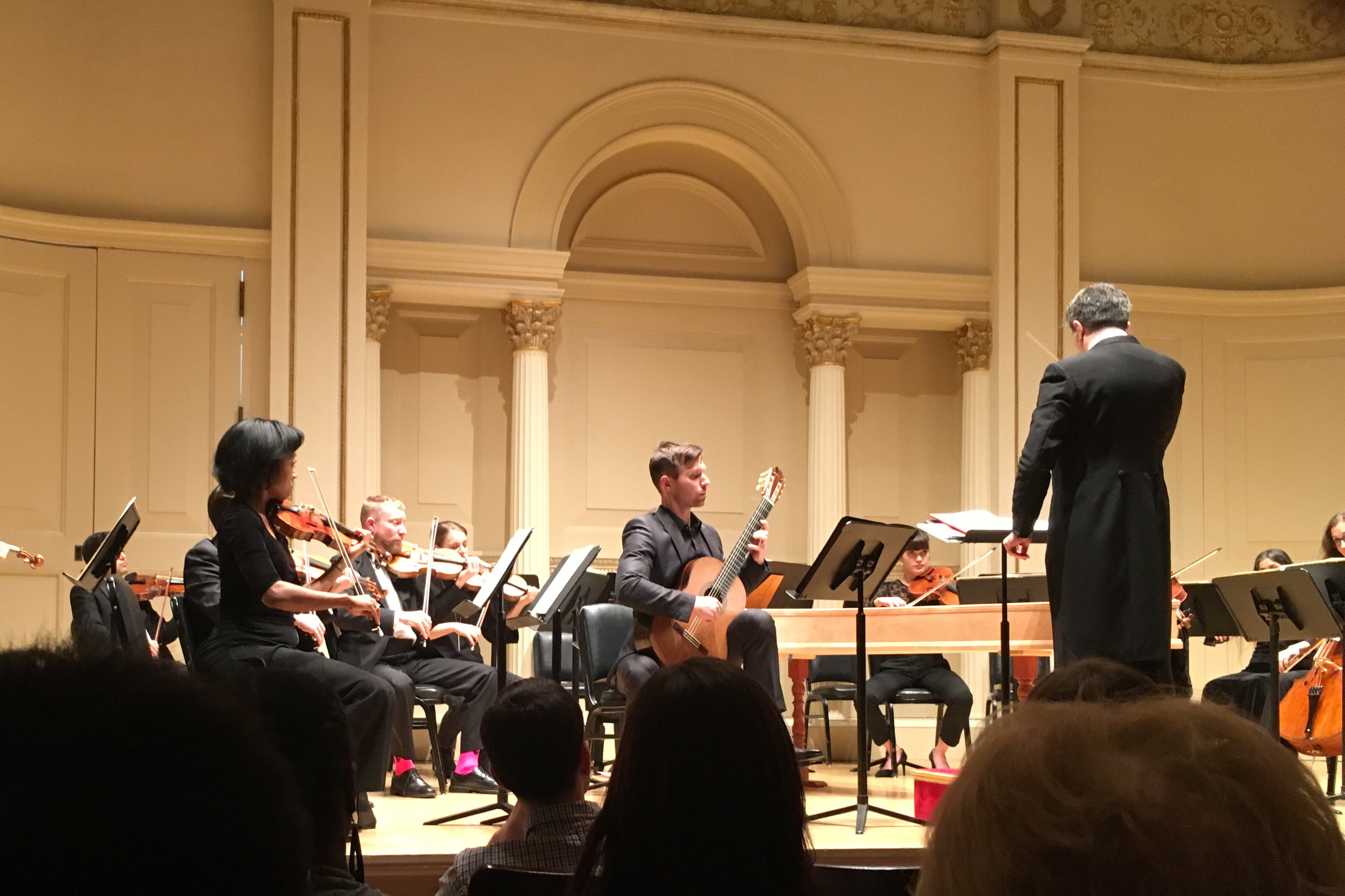
Piotr Pakhomkin performing at Carnegie Hall

Pakhomkin continues to perform concerts in Maryland and across the United States as well as around the world. He teaches classical guitar at the Georgetown Guitar Academy in Washington, D.C.

In September 2024, Pakhomkin and classical guitarist Yuri Liberzon released the album Piazzolla: Music for Guitar on Naxos Records (Catalogue No. 8.574457), featuring arrangements of works by Ástor Piazzolla, including the Tango Suite for two guitars. In a July 2025 review for Fanfare, music critic Peter Burwasser praised their performance of the Tango Suite, writing that it is "enriched by the compelling textures that result from the use of two guitars," and that "Yuri Liberzon and his guest partner Piotr Pakhomkin, both superb technicians, make the most of the delightfully dense patterns of the score."

== Technique ==
Pakhomkin plays exclusively on a 2010 Ross Gutmeier Guitar. He also emphasizes slow practice techniques for endurance and meditation for visualization and focus.
