= Dorothy Bishop =

American singer

Dorothy Bishop is an American variety entertainer, singer and comedian from New York City who is best known for The Dozen Divas Show, a cabaret act in which she performs celebrity impressions of singers such as Cher, Liza Minnelli, Madonna, Lady Gaga, Stevie Nicks, Renée Fleming, Barbra Streisand, Judy Garland, Kristin Chenoweth and Shirley Bassey as well as political figures like Hillary Clinton, Elizabeth Warren and Marianne Williamson.

Reviewing The Dozen Divas Show, critic Michael Musto wrote, "Backed by a rack of clothes and also some wigs positioned on the piano, Bishop did quick changes as she went from Joan Rivers to Shirley Bassey to Steve Nicks, all the way to Liza and Cher. Blessed with a voice capable of opera, Broadway, and pop, she creates funny but appreciative portraits of the women we love. . . . And to counter Lady Gaga singing Sound of Music tunes on the last Oscars, Dorothy appeared as Julie Andrews, singing an awkwardly proper version of 'Telephone,' complete with verses from 'Chim Chim Cheree.' Dorothy Bishop is the best drag queen in town who’s not a drag queen."

Bishop was born in Atlanta, United States, in 1960, and received her Master of Music degree from the Yale School of Music.

Her Off-Broadway credits include Mommie Dearest: The Musical, in which she played Joan Crawford; Spamilton; The Sarah Palin Musical Spectacular and The Sarah Palin Election Day Spectacular, both at the Laurie Beechman Theater in New York City. Bishop also appeared as Sarah Palin in video parodies including "Going Rogue" and "The Ballad of Sarah Palin" with Lady Bunny.

Bishop toured with Faye Dunaway in the first Broadway national tour of Terrence McNally's Tony Award winning play, Master Class. She has performed in such renowned New York venues as Carnegie Hall, Joe's Pub, Zipper Theatre and Town Hall.

Bishop was a nationally televised finalist on the fourth season of America's Got Talent on NBC. She was a co-presenter for the "Hookies" with Leslie Jordan, and has been a guest on the Robin Byrd Show.
