= Horacio Lavandera =

Argentine pianist (born 1984)

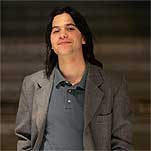

Background information
- Born: December 1, 1984 (age 41); Buenos Aires, Argentina
- Genres: Classical Music
- Occupation: Pianist
- Years active: 1997–present
- Website: www.horaciolavandera.com

Horacio Lavandera (born Buenos Aires, December 1, 1984) is an Argentine pianist, currently residing in Madrid, Spain. As its youngest competitor at the age of sixteen, he won the International Piano Competition Umberto Micheli, held at the Giuseppe Verdi Conservatoire and in Teatro alla Scala in Milan. He has been invited to perform as a soloist with prestigious orchestras, as well as to offer recitals in America, Europe, and Asia.

== Recordings ==
His first CD, Debut, was released in 2000 by Testigo. It includes pieces by Mozart, Chopin, Berg, and Ginastera. As an invited soloist of the YOA Orchestra of the Americas inaugural tour in 2002, he recorded Beethoven's Concerto No. 4. His last CD, The three Bs, includes works by Bach, Brahms, and Beethoven. It was recorded live for Testigo during the season of Festivales Musicales de Buenos Aires in 2005. "Live in Japan" in 2008, "Spanish composers of the generation of 51", by the Community of Madrid in 2008, CD + DVD "Argentine Composers" recorded by Sony Music /Calle Angosta in 2009 and "Chopin", produced and edited by EPSA Music in 2012.

== Performances ==
He has performed as a soloist with orchestras including the Mozarteum Orchester Salzburg, Filarmonica della Scala, Orchestra dell'Accademia Nazionale di Santa Cecilia, London Chamber Pleyers, YOA Orchestra of the Americas, Orquestra do Norte of Portugal, Orquesta Sinfónica de la Ciudad de Oviedo, Orquesta Filarmónica de Buenos Aires, Orquesta Sinfónica Nacional de Argentina, and the Orquestra Metropolitana de Lisboa. He has been under the baton of conductors such as Charles Dutoit, Antonio Pappano, Benjamin Zander, Christopher Wilkins, George Pehlivanian, Anton Nanut, Martin Sieghart, Arthur Fagen, Terje Mikkelsen, and David Murphy.

He has played in the Teatro Alla Scala (Milan), Salle Olivier Messiaen-Radio France (Paris), Teatro Colón (Buenos Aires), Herkulesaal (Munich), Wigmore Hall (London), Accademia Nazionale di Santa Cecilia (Rome), Jordan Hall (Boston), International Piano Festival de La Roque-d'Anthéron, Teatro Municipal (Rio de Janeiro), Teatro Alpha (São Paulo), Teatro Teresa Carreño (Caracas), Teatro Malibrán (Venice), Auditorio Nacional de Música (Madrid), Auditorio de Santa Cruz de Tenerife (Canarian Islands), Auditorio de Galicia (S. de Compostela), Palau de la Musica Catalana (Barcelona), Luzern Saal (Lucerne), Auditorio 'Príncipe Felipe' (Oviedo), Grande Auditório Europarque (Porto), Martha Argerich Festival (Buenos Aires), and the Hamarikyu Asahi Hall (Tokyo).

He has been working with the composers Karlheinz Stockhausen, Marlos Nobre, Esteban Benzecry, Joan Guinjoan, Richard Dubugnon, Guillaume Connesson, Atsuhiko Gondai, and Mauricio Kagel.

== Awards ==
Lavandera won his first competitions in his youth, including the 10th Competition 'Meeting of Children and Young Musicians' (Córdoba, Argentina), and the Vº Biennial Youth Competition 99/00, the latter including a jury composed of Martin Lovett, Malcolm Binns, and Elizabeth Robson.

In August 2004 he was awarded for his interpretation of his works during his Courses in Kürten (Germany) by the German contemporary composer Karlheinz Stockhausen. He was selected as an active student in Maestro Maurizio Pollini's master classes at the Festival of Lucerne 2004 (Switzerland). He was awarded the 'El Primer Palau 2004' (The First Palau) by Orfeó Català Foundation – Palau de la Música Catalana.

Some other awards include Best New Artist in Classical Music at the Vº Awards for Arts and Entertainment, organized by the Argentine newspaper El Clarín, the scholarship of the Fondo Nacional de las Artes (National Fund of Arts, Argentina) and Junior Chamber International prize as one of the outstanding young persons winners 2004 in Argentina in the field of cultural achievements.

At the age of sixteen, he won the International Piano Competition Umberto Micheli, held at the Giuseppe Verdi Conservatoire and in Teatro della Scala in Milan, playing a diverse repertoire that included pieces from baroque to contemporary music. He was also awarded a Special Prize of the Orchestra Filarmonica della Scala. The jury included Luciano Berio, Maurizio Pollini, Luis de Pablo, Michel Beroff, Charles Rosen, and Alexis Weissenberg.

In 2013 Gardel Prize awarded for "Best Classical Music Album" for his album Chopin. In 2014 he received the title of "Honorary Professor" at the Universidad Nacional de Rosario.
