= Maria João Pires =

Portuguese classical pianist (born 1944)

Maria João Pires DmSE GCSE ComIH GCIH
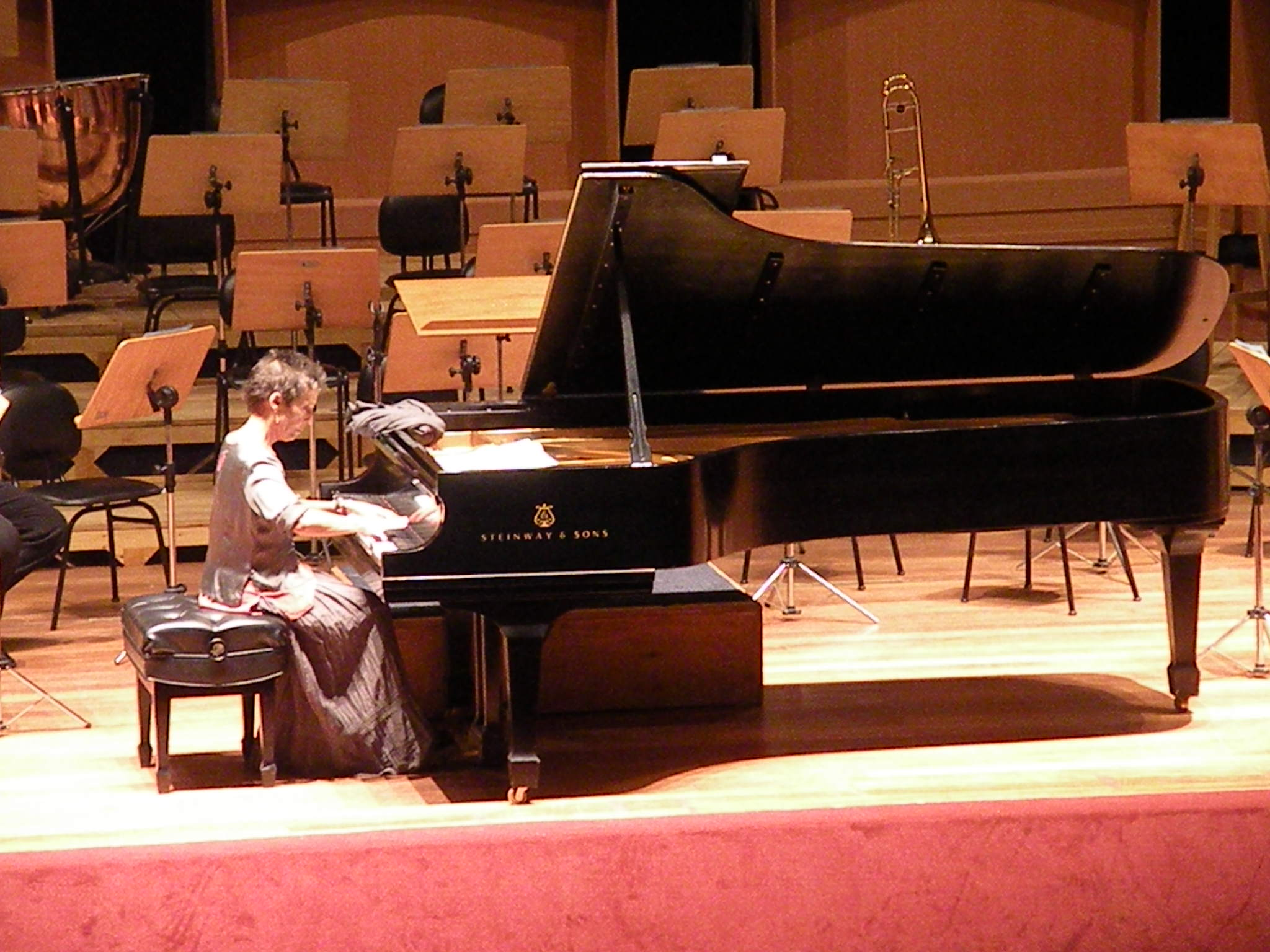
- Pires playing in 2009
- Born: Maria João Alexandre Barbosa Pires; 23 July 1944 (age 82); Lisbon, Portugal
- Occupation: Classical pianist
- Website: www.mariajoaopires.com

Maria João Alexandre Barbosa Pires (Portuguese: [mɐˈɾi.ɐ ʒwɐ̃w ˈpiɾɨʃ]; born 23 July 1944) is a Portuguese classical pianist, widely regarded as one of the leading interpreters of the repertoire of the 18th and 19th centuries.

== Early life and education ==
Pires was born in Lisbon, Portugal, a posthumous daughter of João Baptista Pires and his wife Alzira dos Santos Alexandre Barbosa. She has three siblings: Hugo Alexandre Barbosa Pires, Maria Regina Alexandre Barbosa Pires and Maria Helena Alexandre Barbosa Pires.

Her first recital was at the age of five, and at the age of seven she was already playing Mozart piano concertos publicly. Two years later she received Portugal's top prize for young musicians. In the following years, she studied with Campos Coelho at the Lisbon Conservatory, taking courses in composition, theory, and history of music. She continued her studies in Germany, first in the Musikakademie of Munich with Rosl Schmid and then in Hanover with Karl Engel.

== Career ==
International fame came in 1970, when she won the Beethoven Bicentennial Competition in Brussels. Subsequently, she performed with major orchestras in Europe, America, Canada, Israel and Japan, interpreting works by Bach, Beethoven, Schumann, Schubert, Mozart, Brahms, Chopin and other classical and romantic composers.

Her professionalism achieved worldwide recognition when the 1998 documentary Attrazione d'amore was drawn to the attention of the press and went viral in 2013, and again in 2024. At the start of a lunchtime open rehearsal with Italian conductor Riccardo Chailly in Amsterdam, Pires realized that she had prepared for a different Mozart concerto, "Piano Concerto No. 23", instead of "Piano Concerto No. 20" which the orchestra had started playing. Quickly recovering, she played the correct concerto from memory without error.

Pires performed a solo Chopin recital at the BBC Proms in 2010. In an interview beforehand, she said that after 60 years of recitals and concerts she had cut back her performances but was non-committal about retirement.

From 2012 to 2016, she was a Master in Residence at the Queen Elisabeth Music Chapel in Waterloo, Belgium, where she gave piano lessons and master classes to young talented pianists from all over the world. To foster young musicians, she launched the Partitura Project.

In 2017, she announced her retirement from the stage and tours for 2018, but she continued giving concerts.

On 20 February 2019, she was awarded with a Doctorate Honorary Degree by Pompeu Fabra University of Barcelona. In 2023, she was given the Jean Gimbel Lane Prize in Piano Performance from the Bienen School of Music at Northwestern University.

In June 2025, she announced an indefinite break from the stage while recovering from a cerebrovascular health issue, and at a public event in Lisbon in November of the same year she stated she had finally "retired from performing".

== Recordings ==
Pires performed as a solo artist and in chamber music. Her many successful recordings include performances of the Moonlight and other sonatas by Beethoven, Le Voyage Magnifique (the complete impromptus of Schubert), nocturnes and other works by Chopin, and Mozart trios with Augustin Dumay (violin) and Jian Wang (cello).

She won the Pessoa Prize in 1989, and founded the Belgais Centre for Study of the Arts in 1999.

Gramophone selected her recordings of the Chopin nocturnes as the best version available: "I have no hesitation in declaring Maria João Pires—a pianist without a trace of narcissism—among the most eloquent master-musicians of our time." (Bryce Morrison). Her recording of Beethoven's 3rd and 4th piano concertos with the Swedish Radio Symphony Orchestra and Daniel Harding won the 2015 Gramophone Classical Music Awards - Concerto Category

Another of her acclaimed recordings is Mozart: The Piano Sonatas. According to the Penguin Guide, "Maria João Pires is a stylist and a fine Mozartian. She is always refined yet never wanting in classical feeling, and she has a vital imagination. She strikes an ideal balance between poise and expressive sensibility, conveying a sense of spontaneity in everything she does."

== Partial discography ==
- Bach’s Partita no. 1, French Suite no. 2 and English Suite no. 3 (1996, Deutsche Grammophon), recipient of Grand Prix du Disque
- Chopin, Schubert, Mozart etc.: Complete Concerto Recordings on Deutsche Grammophon 2014
- Chopin, Schubert, Mozart etc.: Complete Solo Recordings on Deutsche Grammophon 2014
- Mozart: Lieder and Arias [Accompanist to Barbara Hendricks] [EMI]
- Mozart: Piano Sonatas Complete (Denon)
- Beethoven: Piano Concertos 3 & 4 (2014, Onyx Classics)
- Mozart; Fantasies KV 397-KV475, Rondos KV485-KV511 (Denon BB-7009) 1974
- Mozart: Piano Concertos 14, 17, 21, & 26 (2013, Deutsche Grammophon)
- Schubert (2013, Deutsche Grammophon)
- Chopin (2008, Deutsche Grammophon)
- Beethoven: Piano Sonatas (2001, Erato)
- Schumann: Piano Concerto, Piano Quintet (2000, Deutsche Grammophon)
- Chopin: Piano Concertos 1 & 2 (1999, Erato)
- Chopin: Nocturnes (1996, Deutsche Grammophon), Record Academy Prize, Tokyo and Grand Prix du Disque
- Franck, Debussy: Violin Sonatas; Ravel: Berceuse; Habanera; Tzigane (1996, Deutsche Grammophon)
- Mozart: Piano Sonatas K. 281, K. 282, K. 533/K. 494 (1993, Deutsche Grammophon)
- Mozart: Piano Sonatas K. 331 & 457; Fantasias K. 397 & 475 (1990, Deutsche Grammophon)
- Schubert: Sonata; 6 Moments Musicaux; 2 Scherzi (1989, Deutsche Grammophon)
- Mozart: The Great Concertos for Piano (1978, Erato)

== Move to Brazil ==
In 2006 she moved to Lauro de Freitas—a town near Salvador, Brazil—and continued performing. At the time of her move, she commented that she had suffered much adverse publicity in Portugal due to her Belgais Centre project to help tackle the significant problem of underprivileged children, a project that the Portuguese Government helped to fund but publicly shied away from. The centre continued to operate at her farm in Portugal and she subsequently started similar projects in Brazil.

In 2017, she moved back to Belgais, in Portugal.

== Social engagement ==
"It is in response to this issue that Maria João Pires launched the Partitura project. It is all about creating favourable circumstances for transmission by encouraging reciprocal listening between generations: inciting well-known musicians to foster young musicians and to invite them (as the name suggests) to share the concert platform".

== Honours and awards ==
=== Honours ===
- Dame of the Order of Saint James of the Sword (9 August 1983)
- Commander of the Order of Prince Henry (9 June 1989)
- Grand Cross of the Order of Saint James of the Sword (9 June 1998)
- Grand Cross of the Order of Prince Henry (19 May 2019)
- Honorary doctorate (Doctor Honoris Causa), Pompeu Fabra University of Barcelona (20 February 2019)
- Five Grand Prix du Disque Awards for various recordings of Bach, Brahms, Mozart and Chopin
- Praemium Imperiale for music (2024)
