= Klaus Heymann =

German entrepreneur

Klaus Heymann (born 22 October 1936) is a German entrepreneur and the founder and head of the Naxos record label.

== Early life ==
Heymann was born in Frankfurt, Germany, and studied Romance languages and English at the Universities of Frankfurt and Lisbon, at King's College London and finally at the Sorbonne in Paris. To pay his way through university, he worked as a tennis coach.

== Career ==
=== Early career ===
Heymann worked in advertising sales and special supplement production for an American newspaper in his native Frankfurt, then worked in international marketing for Braun AG. He first went to Hong Kong in 1967 to start up the office of the Overseas Weekly, the American newspaper he had worked for in Frankfurt. He "arrived with a suitcase and a typewriter, and strangely enough the hotel which had been booked for me didn't exist anymore." He subsequently created a direct-mail advertising business, then a mail-order company providing goods to members of the United States military in Vietnam. He sold such items as cameras, watches and audio equipment, including Bose speakers and Revox tape recorders.

=== Hong Kong ===
Following the end of the war in Vietnam, Heymann became the Hong Kong distributor for Bose and Revox, and, later, Studer recording studio equipment. He began organizing classical music concerts to help boost the sales of the brands he sold. When Heymann found that many of the musicians who performed at these concerts could not find their recordings in Hong Kong record shops, he started importing a number of classical record labels, including Vox-Turnabout, Hungaroton, Supraphon and Opus Records, for his company Studer-Revox (Hong Kong) to be later renamed Pacific Music.

Heymann was asked to join the board of the then-amateur Hong Kong Philharmonic Orchestra in 1973, and helped this orchestra become a full-time professional orchestra in 1974. At this time, he also met his future wife, Japanese violinist Takako Nishizaki, who came to play as soloist with the Hong Kong Philharmonic.

Heymann's desire to help his wife's career led him to start making her recordings, including that of the Chinese Butterfly Lovers' Violin Concerto with the Nagoya Philharmonic Orchestra. Since 1978, it sold several hundred thousand copies legitimately and millions in China.

After this unexpected success, Heymann created a label called HK to record other works with the Hong Kong Philharmonic and the Singapore Symphony Orchestra. At the same time, he began to import and license music from pop labels such as RCA, Arista, Virgin Records, Chrysalis Records and others.

While Heymann was successful selling records of Asian music, he wanted to record rare works, and decided to create the Marco Polo label to do this. After initially recording in Hong Kong and Singapore, Heymann switched to eastern European countries, profiting from his connections with the Hungaroton and Opus labels, located in Hungary and Czechoslovakia, which he distributed.

=== Naxos ===
In 1987, Heymann founded the Naxos label, with the goal of selling budget-priced classical CDs. His goal was to sell CDs at the same price as LPs, or roughly one-third of the price of CDs at the time. At first, he was acquiring digital recordings from a German company. Then, Naxos began developing its catalog with young or unknown artists and orchestras. Heymann assumed the Naxos catalog would not cover more than fifty releases, thinking that the major labels would begin competing in the same sector, but given the success of the label, the company went on to become a full-fledged classical label covering a wide range of music.

Over the years, Heymann led the label to not only record the standard classical repertoire, but also to focus on works that were not often recorded, or not at all. The company is "still filling gaps in the repertoire."

Heymann was one of the early proponents of digital music and led Naxos to put its entire catalog online for streaming in 1996 via hnh.com that became naxos.com. In 2002, he launched the Naxos Music Library, essentially used by educational institutions and libraries. In 2007, Heymann stated that "the label was positioned to survive and prosper without selling CDs," and that "revenue from other sources is now big enough to let us not only survive but lead a healthy, profitable existence." He also created distribution companies in most major music markets to distribute Naxos recordings, and the group of companies is now a major distributor of classical recordings and classical music DVDs around the world, including those of Warner Classics and Sony.

Heymann claimed, in a 2007 interview with Stereophile Magazine, that he was only just making a "decent return" from the more than $80 million he invested in the company, "thanks to the advent of digital platforms." He sees the future of the classical music market as a mix of CDs, downloads and streaming: "Whether physical product will be a half of today or a third of today, nobody knows. There will also be downloads, and all kinds of subscription things. Our streaming classical-music library right now is by far the most successful in our field, and the most profitable for us and for the labels. But there may be others that mix paid and unpaid streaming."

Heymann's strategy is to be "the last man standing in terms of distributing classical music in physical form."

Heymann is also the co-founder of Artaria Editions, a music-publishing house with a specialist interest in rare eighteenth-century repertoire.

In March 2024, Heymann personally acquired Chandos Records. The announcement mentioned that there would be no immediate changes among the people managing Chandos Records, which will continue to operate independently and under the same name, but worldwide distribution of physical and digital Chandos products will be handled by the Naxos Music Group.

== Personal life ==
Heymann lives in Hong Kong with his wife Takako Nishizaki and their son Henryk Nishizaki-Heymann.

In 2007, Heymann successfully sued music critic Norman Lebrecht for defamation, for a book entitled Maestros, Masterpieces and Madness: The Secret Life and Shameful Death of the Classical Record Industry, published by Penguin, which led to the UK publisher pulping all copies of the book.
