= Takako Nishizaki =

Japanese violinist (born 1944)

- 西崎 崇子
- Born: April 14, 1944 (age 82); Nagoya, Japan
- Spouse: Klaus Heymann
- Musical career
- Occupation: Violinist
- Label: Naxos
- Website: tnviolinstudio.com

Takako Nishizaki BBS (born 14 April 1944) is a Japanese violinist. She was the first student to complete the Suzuki Method course, at age nine.

== Biography ==
Nishizaki went to the United States from Japan in 1962. She first studied with Broadus Erle at Yale University, and later with Joseph Fuchs at Juilliard.

In 1964, she was a runner-up in the Leventritt Competition, in which Itzhak Perlman won first prize. In 1966, she was awarded Juilliard's Fritz Kreisler Scholarship.

In 1969, she won first prize in the Juilliard Concerto Competition performing Mozart’s Sinfonia Concertante with violist Nobuko Imai. Some of Nishizaki's recordings with the Slovak Philharmonic under Kenneth Jean by Naxos Records of famous violin concertos are highly ranked by The Penguin Guide to Recorded Classical Music. She has performed and recorded with pianists such as Andras Schiff, Jenö Jandó and Michael Ponti, and has performed in a number of chamber music ensembles.

Nishizaki is married to the Naxos label owner Klaus Heymann, and teaches violin in Hong Kong, where she was awarded the Bronze Bauhinia Star in 2003 for her work in classical music and charity.

== Discography ==
Nishizaki's recording of Vivaldi's "Four Seasons" has sold over a million copies.
