= Parisonatina al'Dodecafonia =

1964 violoncello composition by Donald Martino

Parisonatina al'Dodecafonia is a 1964 composition by Donald Martino for violoncello solo.

== Background ==
The work shows a relentless preference in exploring notes in a twelve-tone system. It also consistently approaches the structure and cellistic technique through an imaginative approach. The title is a wordplay on the name of virtuoso cellist Aldo Parisot for whom the piece was composed. His name appears embedded throughout in a short succession of notes producing a single impression that appears throughout the entire piece.

It was written in four movements, though it was actually conceived in two parts of a two movement context. A performance takes about ten minutes.

When Parisot premiered the work in 1966 at Tanglewood, the New York Times music critic Harold C. Schonberg, who was not normally in favour of 12-tone music, called it a "whizbang virtuoso piece in the modern idiom".
