= Janna Baty =

American mezzo-soprano opera singer (born 1968)

Janna Baty (born January 1, 1968) is an American mezzo-soprano opera singer. She is best known for her singing in contemporary music and operas. Baty is also a professor at the Yale School of Music where she directs the student opera.

== Biography ==
Baty is from Lexington, Massachusetts. She attended Oberlin College and the Yale School of Music. At Yale, she studied with Doris Yarick Cross. After graduating, she moved to New York City and lives in Highbridge, Bronx.

== Career ==
Baty has performed with many major opera companies and orchestras, including the Boston Symphony, Los Angeles Philharmonic, Hamburg State Opera, Royal Philharmonic Orchestra, Opera Theatre of Saint Louis, Opera North, and Boston Lyric Opera. Among the numerous conductors with whom she has sung are James Levine, Seiji Ozawa, Michel Plasson, Carl Davis, Robert Spano, Steuart Bedford, Stephen Lord, Gil Rose, and Shinik Hahm.

She has made appearances around the world as a soloist, chamber musician, and recitalist, including at the Aldeburgh Festival in the U.K. and the Tanglewood Festival and Norfolk Chamber Music Festival in the United States.

Noted for her work in new music, Baty has collaborated with many contemporary composers, among them John Harbison, Bernard Rands, Yehudi Wyner, Peter Child, Reza Vali, and Paul Moravec.

Baty has served as a professor of undergraduate and secondary voice at her alma mater, Yale School of Music, since 2008. She is a director of student opera there.

== Work ==
Baty's voice has been described by The Washington Post as an "earth, dusky timbre." Baty's recordings include Reza Vali's Folk Songs; Lukas Foss’s opera Griffelkin; the world-premiere recording of Eric Sawyer’s opera Our American Cousin; and John Harbison's Mirabai Songs, all with Boston Modern Orchestra Project. American Record Guide wrote that Baty was "a vocally and interpretively commanding presence as the principal actress of the company" for Our American Cousin. Guide to Records' Payton MacDonald, wrote that "I was especially taken with Janna Baty's expressive and silvky voice on the Folk Songs" on the recording of Vali's flute concerto.

In 2012, Baty performed in The Face by Donald Crockett, where The Boston Globe wrote that she "found a neat intersection of Broadway brass and the dark richness of opera's long list of mezzo-soprano antagonists" in her role as Infanta.
