= Aldo Parisot =

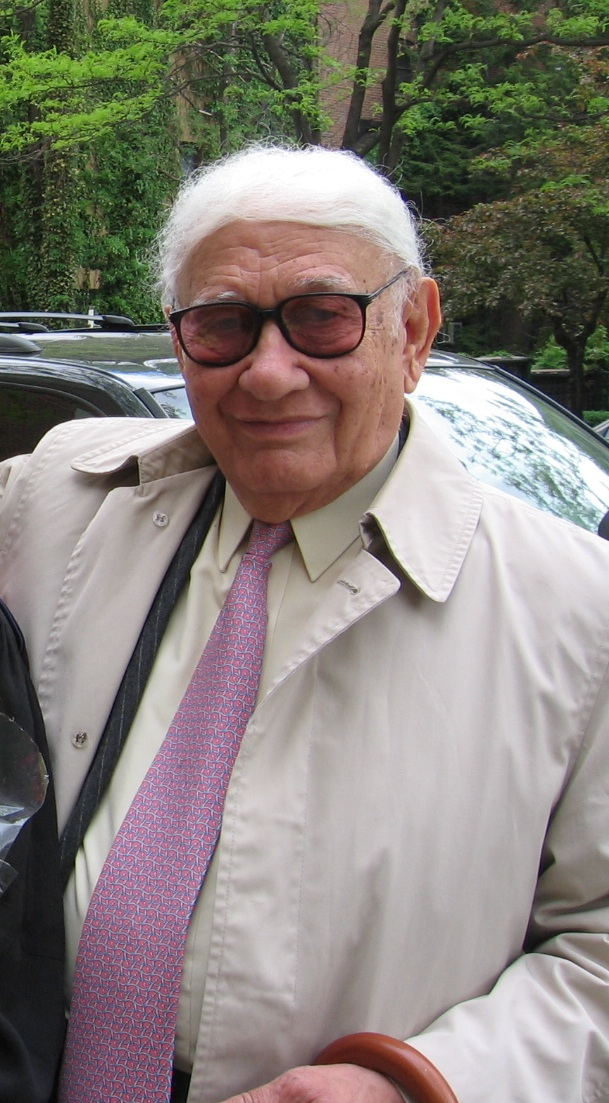
- Aldo Parisot, New Haven, May 2005

Background information
- Born: Aldo Simoes Parisot; September 30, 1918; Natal, Brazil
- Died: December 29, 2018 (aged 100) Guilford, Connecticut
- Genre: Classical
- Occupations: Cellist, Cello teacher
- Instrument: Cello
- Years active: fl. ca. 1946–2018
- Labels: Albany Records, Naxos Records, Delos International
- Formerly of: Yale Cellos

Aldo Simoes Parisot (September 30, 1918 – December 29, 2018) was a Brazilian-born American cellist and cello teacher. He was first a member of the Juilliard School faculty, and then went on to serve as a music professor at the Yale School of Music for sixty years (1958 to 2018), the longest-serving member of that school's faculty ever.

== Early life and musical training ==
Born in Natal, Rio Grande do Norte, Brazil, Parisot began studying cello at age seven with his stepfather, Tomazzo Babini. From Babini, he learned the importance of playing without unnecessary tension—something he credits as the foundation for the rest of his career. At the age of 12 he gave his professional debut as a cellist. From there, he moved on to become principal cellist of the Brazilian Symphony Orchestra in Rio de Janeiro. During one of the concerts, Carleton Sprague Smith, the attaché to the American embassy was in attendance. Upon witnessing Parisot's performance of Brahms's Double Concerto with violinist Ricardo Odnoposoff, he proceeded to go backstage and invited Parisot to attend a party thrown for Yehudi Menuhin. At the party, Smith told Parisot he would arrange for Parisot to study at the Curtis Institute of Music with Emanuel Feuermann. However, Feuermann died unexpectedly on May 25, 1942, three months before Parisot's intended arrival in the US.

Sometime later, Smith again approached Parisot, this time with an offer to pursue studies of music theory and chamber music at Yale University on scholarship. Accommodations were to be made such that Parisot could avoid taking lessons, as Feuermann was the only one Parisot was interested in studying with. Parisot accepted, and began as a "special student" at Yale in 1946. Parisot's theory professor at Yale was Paul Hindemith, with whom Parisot became close friends. However, after an argument concerning a missed rehearsal, the two got into a fight—Parisot exclaiming to Hindemith "You and your orchestra can go to hell!". A representative of the student union visited him and warned him that he could be deported. Hindemith and Parisot soon after resolved the misunderstanding.

== Solo career ==
At age 26, during the start of his studies at Yale, he made his United States debut with the Boston Symphony Orchestra at the Tanglewood Music Festival. He embarked on his first European tour the following year. Following this, he earned a degree from Yale School of Music and toured throughout the United States, Canada, and South America. According to Margaret Campbell, in her book The Great Cellists, "Parisot was a brilliant soloist, chamber musician and teacher who based his ideas on the playing of Emanuel Feuermann."

In the 1950s Parisot appeared in numerous solo concerts and soloed in many concertos with orchestras. During this time, he also premiered works by composers such as Heitor Villa-Lobos, Camargo Guarnieri, Jose Siqueira, Quincy Porter, Mel Powell, Cláudio Santoro, Donald Martino as well as other works that were written and dedicated to him. He was recognized for his musicality, temperament and virtuoso playing as well as his teaching abilities.

Parisot gave first performances of composers such as Carmago Guarnieri, Quincy Porter, Alvin Etler, Claudio Santoro, Joan Panetti, Ezra Laderman, Yehudi Wyner, and Heitor Villa-Lobos always trying to enlarge the cello repertoire. Villa-Lobos composed his Cello Concerto No. 2 for Parisot, and dedicated the concerto to him. Parisot gave the first performance at his debut with the New York Philharmonic. Orchestras such as the Amsterdam, Berlin, Chicago, London, Los Angeles, Munich, Paris, Pittsburgh, Rio de Janeiro, Stockholm, Vienna and Warsaw, have played with him with prestigious conductors such as Leopold Stokowski, John Barbirolli, Pierre-Michel Le Conte, Leonard Bernstein, Eleazar de Carvalho, Zubin Mehta, Claude Monteux, Paul Paray, Victor de Sabata, Sawallisch, Hindemith, and Heitor Villa-Lobos. In this period, he was also the cellist with the Yale Quartet, with Broadus Erle, Syoko Aki and Walter Trampler.

From 1956 to 1996, Parisot owned the De Munck Stradivarius.

In 1966, he was a soloist with the Naumburg Orchestral Concerts, in the Naumburg Bandshell, Central Park, in the summer series.

Parisot's performance at Tanglewood of Donald Martino's Parisonatina al'Dodecafonia for solo cello—a piece written for Parisot—received many favorable reviews, including from Harold Schonberg of The New York Times and from The Boston Globe.

== Teaching ==
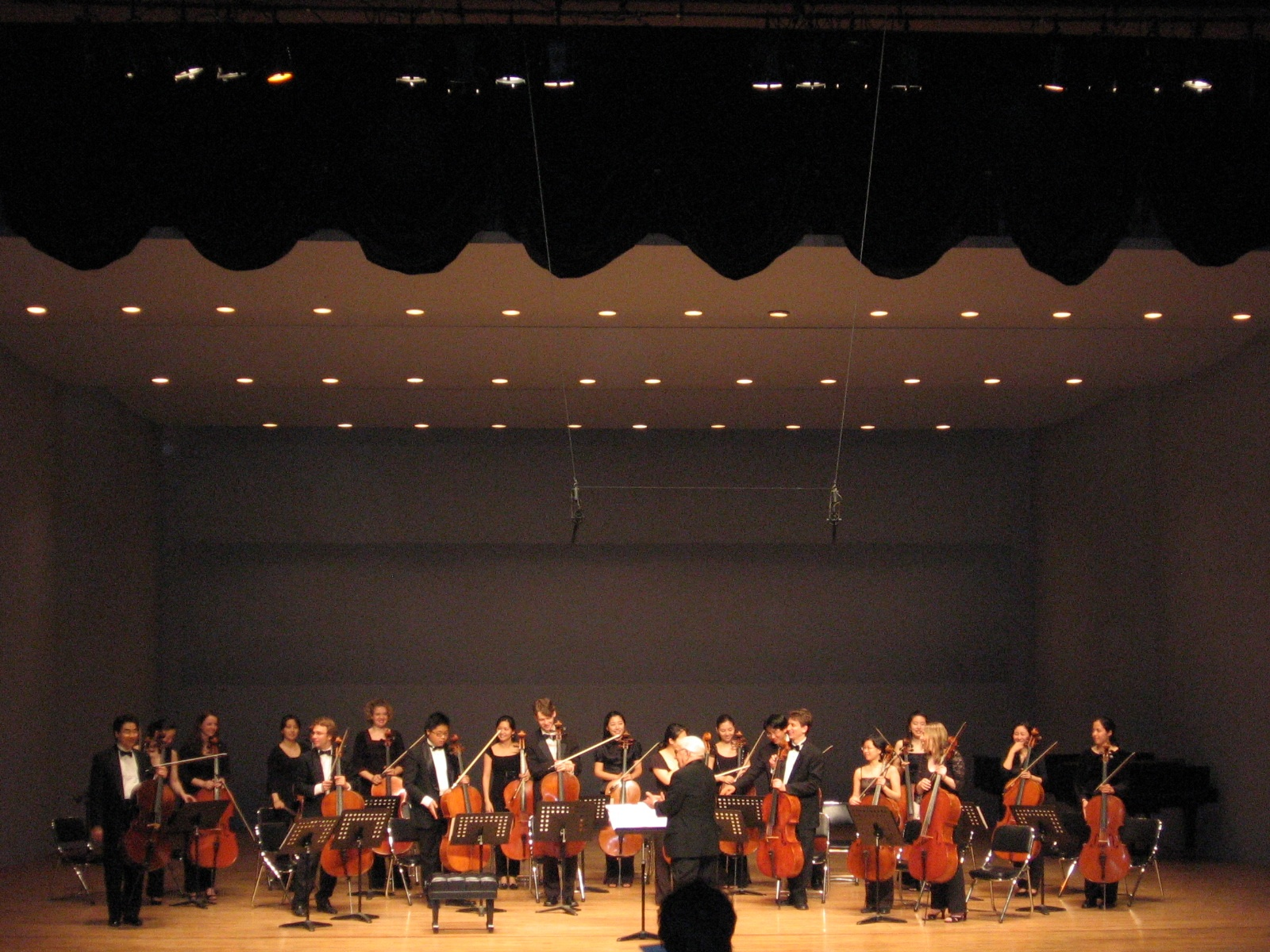
Yale Cellos, South Korea, 2005

Parisot was renowned for his teaching, having held posts at Peabody Conservatory, Mannes College of Music, the Juilliard School, and the New England Conservatory in addition to his position at Yale, which he assumed in 1958. Throughout the years, his students have gone on to careers as prominent concert artists, teachers and players in major symphony orchestras. Some better-known former students of his include Rhonda Rider, Jesús Castro-Balbi, Shauna Rolston, Bion Tsang, Ralph Kirshbaum, Han-na Chang, Robert deMaine, Johann Sebastian Paetsch, Jian Wang. According to Kirshbaum: "Parisot had a virtuoso left hand technique and was a great teacher. He also furthered the use of my musical imagination in a technical sense."

In addition to maintaining a private studio, Parisot conducted the Yale Cellos since 1983. Formed as an ensemble of his current students, the group has since released a number of award-winning CDs, one of which received a Grammy nomination. Parisot formally retired from Yale in July 2018, having been the longest-serving faculty member of the Yale School of Music and also the oldest member of the Yale University faculty.

== Master classes ==
Parisot regularly gave master classes at the Banff Centre from 1980 to 2007, in addition to his regular teaching at the Yale Summer School in Norfolk, and at several other summer festivals. In 1984, Parisot gave a month's worth of master classes in China, where he auditioned prospective students, and the following year he was invited back. Beginning in 1987, he gave master classes and performances at the Jerusalem Music Center in Israel. He also taught at the Great Mountains Music Festival and School at the Yongpyong resort. He gave master classes at the Sibelius Academy in November 1991. In Seoul, Parisot offered courses of master classes at the Chung-Ang University beginning May 1994. He also held master classes at the Manchester International Cello Festival, and conducted a large cello ensemble. In January 2000 he toured Taiwan performing with the teaching staff to aid earthquake relief victims.

Alan Rich of New York has commented about these master classes:

The master classes are extraordinary – Parisot has that enormous, rare gift of translating musical feeling into solid information about what to do with a set of fingers and a bow. Maybe there are master classes for clarinet, or trombone, somewhere in the world, but I doubt that they operate on the level of intensity that you find at Parisot's classes at Yale ... as a teacher, he is an object of pilgrimage.

== Member of competition juries ==
Parisot served on juries of distinct international competitions, including those in Munich, Florence, Chile, Brazil, Évian, and Paris (Rostropovich Competition), in addition to various others throughout the US and Canada. In November 1991, he traveled to Helsinki, Finland, to participate as a member of the jury in the first Paulo International Cello Competition. He regularly returned to Morelia to judge the Carlos Prieto International Cello Competition.

In August 2007, he presided over the jury at the First Aldo Parisot International Competition in Yongpyong, South Korea. In December 2008, he was on the jury of the First International Krzysztof Penderecki Cello Competition in Poland.

== Paintings ==
Parisot was also a painter, and exhibited his work at galleries in Boston (New York), New Haven and Palm Beach, and on tour in Poland. He donated all proceeds from the sales of his paintings to the Aldo Parisot Scholarship Fund (recently renamed the "Cello Enrichment Fund").

== Personal life ==
Parisot was married twice. His first marriage, to the former Ellen Lewis, produced three sons, one of whom is film director Aldo L. "Dean" Parisot. His second marriage, to the pianist Elizabeth Sawyer Parisot, lasted 52 years, until his death. Parisot died at his home in Guilford, Connecticut, on December 29, 2018, aged 100.

== Awards and recognitions ==
Parisot received numerous awards and honors over the years, including gold medals and honorary citizenships from Lebanon and Brazil.

- In 1980 Parisot was awarded the Eva Janzer "Chevalier du Violoncelle" by Indiana University
- In September 1982, he was awarded the United Nations Peace Medal following his performance at its Staff Day ceremonies
- In 1983 he received the Artist/Teacher Award presented by the American String Teachers Association
- A Yale faculty member since 1958, Aldo Parisot was named the Samuel Sanford Professor of Music at Yale in 1994.
- In May 1997, Parisot received the Governor's Arts Award from the State of Connecticut
- In 1999 he was awarded an honorary Doctorate of Music from Shenandoah University
- In 2001 he received the Award of Distinction from the Royal Northern College of Music in Manchester, England
- In 2002 he received the Gustave Stoeckel Award
- In 2002 he was honored as an honorary Doctor of Fine Arts from Penn State University
