= Jian Wang (cellist) =

Chinese cellist (born 1968)

Jian Wang 王健
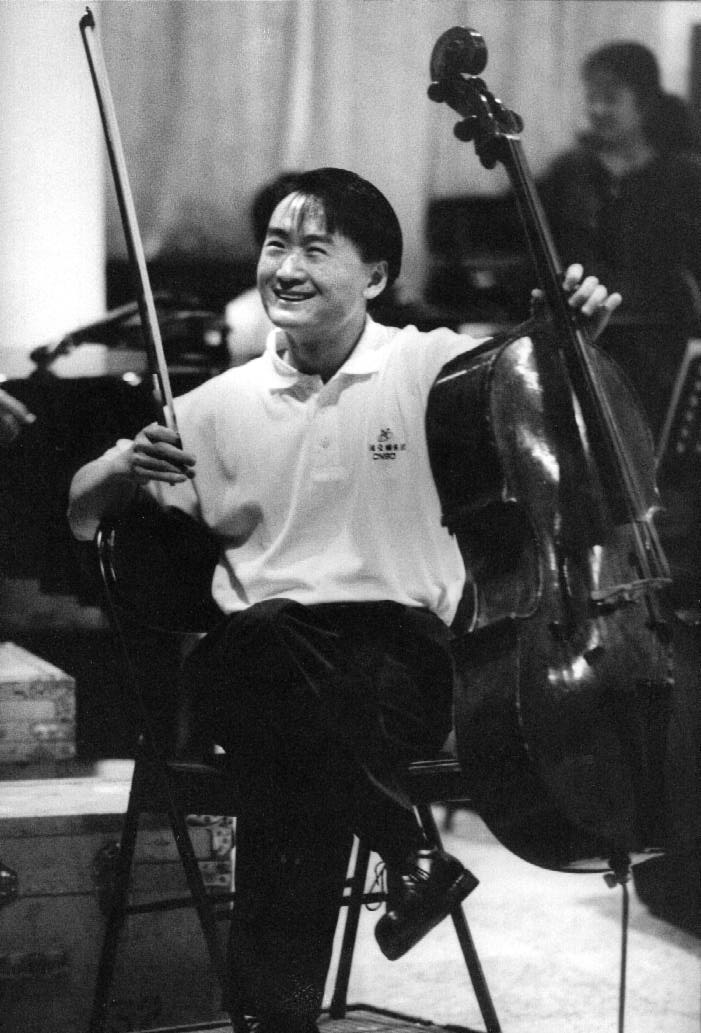
- Wang in rehearsal

Background information
- Born: 1968 (age 57–58); Xi'an, China
- Genres: Classical
- Occupation: Musician
- Instrument: Cello
- Years active: 1987–present
- Label: Deutsche Grammophon

Jian Wang (Chinese: 王健; pinyin: Wáng Jiàn; born 1968) is a Chinese cellist. A soloist, chamber musician, recording artist and teacher, he was the first Chinese musician to ever sign an exclusive contract with Deutsche Grammophon.

== Early life and education ==
Wang began to study the cello with his father when he was four. While a student at the Shanghai Conservatory of Music, he was featured in the Academy Award-winning documentary film From Mao to Mozart: Isaac Stern in China. In 1981, at twelve years old, he made his professional debut playing the Saint-Saëns Cello Concerto No. 1 with the Shanghai Symphony Orchestra. In 1985, with Mr Stern's support, he entered the Yale School of Music under a special programme where he studied with the renowned cellist Aldo Parisot.

== Career ==
As a soloist, Wang has performed with many of the world's leading orchestras, including the Berlin Philharmonic, Royal Concertgebouw Orchestra, London Symphony Orchestra, New York Philharmonic, Boston Symphony Orchestra, Chicago Symphony Orchestra, Cleveland Orchestra, Los Angeles Philharmonic, Philadelphia Orchestra, Tonhalle-Orchester Zürich, Orchestra dell'Accademia Nazionale di Santa Cecilia, Mahler Chamber Orchestra, Orchestre National de France, Orchestre de Paris, Czech Philharmonic, and the NHK Symphony Orchestra. He has also collaborated with conductors such as Claudio Abbado, Wolfgang Sawallisch, Neeme Järvi, Riccardo Chailly, Charles Dutoit, Christoph Eschenbach, Myung-whun Chung, Alan Gilbert, and Gustavo Dudamel.

Wang is the first-ever artist-in-residence of the National Centre for the Performing Arts in Beijing and the Shanghai Symphony Orchestra. As a jury member, he has served on the jury of many of the most important competitions, including the International Tchaikovsky Competition, Queen Elisabeth Competition, Shanghai Isaac Stern International Violin Competition, and the Carl Nielsen International Music Competition. Currently, he is a cello professor at the Shanghai Conservatory of Music and occupies the International Chair in Cello at the Royal Birmingham Conservatoire. He is also a member of the artistic committee for both the Shanghai Symphony Orchestra and the Hangzhou Philharmonic Orchestra.

Wang has recorded numerous albums, his latest release being the Elgar Cello Concerto with the Sydney Symphony Orchestra and Vladimir Ashkenazy. As an exclusive artist for Deutsche Grammophon, he has recorded among others, the complete Bach Cello Suites, the Brahms Double Concerto with the Berlin Philharmonic, Claudio Abbado and Gil Shaham, a Baroque Album with Camerata Salzburg, the Haydn Cello Concertos with the Gulbenkian Orchestra under Muhai Tang, and chamber music by Brahms, Mozart and Schumann with Maria João Pires and Augustin Dumay.

Wang plays on a 1622 Brothers Amati cello that was loaned to him by the family of the late Mr. Sau-Wing Lam.

== Discography ==
- Presenting Jian Wang (Delos, 1992)
- Brahms - Piano Trios with Maria João Pires and Augustin Dumay (Deutsche Grammophon, 1995)
- Mozart - Piano Trios K.496 & K.502 with Maria João Pires and Augustin Dumay (Deutsche Grammophon, 1997)
- Haydn: Cello Concerto No. 1 & 2 with the Gulbenkian Orchestra and Muhai Tang (Deutsche Grammophon, 1999)
- Messiaen: Quartet for the End of Time with Gil Shaham, Paul Meyer and Myung-Whun Chung (Deutsche Grammophon, 2001)
- Brahms: Violin Concerto; Double Concerto with the Berlin Philharmonic, Gil Shaham and Claudio Abbado (Deutsche Grammophon, 2001)
- The Baroque Album with Camerata Salzburg (Deutsche Grammophon, 2003)
- Bach: The Cello Suites (Deutsche Grammophon, 2005)
- Reverie with Göran Söllscher (Deutsche Grammophon, 2007)
- Elgar: The Dream of Gerontius - Cello Concerto with the Sydney Symphony Orchestra and Vladimir Ashkenazy (ABC Classics, 2011)
