= Yale Quartet =

String quartet at Yale University led by Broadus Erle (1960–1977)

The Yale Quartet was a string quartet based at Yale University composed of musicians in the Yale School of Music and formed and led by violinist Broadus Erle (formerly of the New Music Quartet) from the time he arrived at Yale in 1960. The Yale Quartet is especially acclaimed for their classic recordings of the Beethoven late string quartets, made for the Vanguard label during the late 1960s and early 1970s. Violist David Schwartz, who began with the quartet, was later replaced by renowned violist Walter Trampler. Original 2nd Violinist Yoko Matsuda was succeeded by Syoko Aki in 1967; Aki still teaches at Yale, having joined the faculty in 1968 and violoncellist Aldo Parisot retired from Yale in 2018 at the age of 99, following a 60-year tenure there; he died in December 2018, shortly after his 100th birthday. After Broadus Erle's premature death in 1977, the Yale Quartet disbanded. The Tokyo Quartet was the quartet-in-residence at Yale for most of the period since the late 1970s, until the Brentano String Quartet was appointed to the position in 2013. The Yale's celebrated recordings of Beethoven's last five quartets and Grosse Fuge for Vanguard have been reissued on compact disc, as have their only other recordings, of two Mozart quartets, K.421 and K.575, and the Brahms piano quintet with André Previn.

== Personnel ==
1st violin:

- Broadus Erle

2nd violin:

- Yoko Matsuda (1964–1967)
- Syoko Aki

Viola:

- David Schwartz
- Walter Trampler

Cello:

- Aldo Parisot

== Recordings ==
- Beethoven Quartets Op 127 & 131: Erle-Aki-Schwartz-Parisot; Op 132: Erle-Matsuda-Schwartz-Parisot; Op 130, 133, 135: Erle-Aki-Trampler-Parisot). Originally issued on LP: Vanguard Cardinal Series Set VCS-10101.
- Brahms Piano Quintet in F minor op 34 (issued 1973), HMV LP ASD 2873 (Erle-Aki-Trampler-Parisot, André Previn piano
- Mozart Quartets in D minor K 421 and D major K 575, Vanguard Cardinal LP VCS 10019 (Erle-Matsuda-Schwartz-Parisot).
