= Bion Tsang =

American cellist and professor (born 1967)

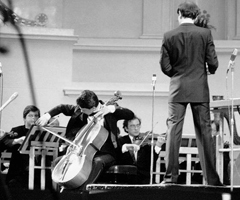
- with Valery Gergiev and the Moscow Philharmonic

Background information
- Born: May 4, 1967 (age 59); Lansing, Michigan, United States
- Genres: Classical
- Occupations: Cellist, Professor
- Instrument: Cello
- Years active: 1979 - present
- Website: www.biontsang.com

Bion Yu-Ting Tsang (traditional Chinese/simplified Chinese: 章雨亭; pinyin: Zhāng Yǔ-Tíng) (born May 4, 1967) is an American cellist and professor.

== Biography ==
Bion Tsang was born in Lansing, Michigan to Chinese parents. His father, Paul Ja-Min Tsang (章哲民), received a PhD from Michigan State University in metallurgy and his mother, Helena Rosa Lit (列國梅), pursued a doctorate in political science. When Tsang was 6 weeks old, his family moved to Poughkeepsie, New York, where his father started a 30-year career as an engineer at IBM.

Tsang began piano studies at age six and added cello a year later. At age eight he entered the Juilliard School of Music Pre-College Division, where he studied cello with Ardyth Alton, Channing Robbins and Leonard Rose and piano with Edgar Roberts. Tsang attended Harvard University for college, returning to Poughkeepsie on weekends to study cello with Luis Garcia-Renart. He received his Bachelor of Arts degree from Harvard, where he was nominated for a Rhodes Scholarship and graduated with honors in January 1989. Subsequently, he spent the next six months in London, England studying cello privately with William Pleeth, before moving on to Yale University to study cello with Aldo Parisot. Tsang received a Master of Music degree from Yale in June 1991 and a Master of Musical Arts degree in June 1993.

Tsang met his wife, Amy Levine, also a concert cellist and teacher, at the Marlboro Music Festival in Vermont. Amy's father, Julius Levine, was a concert double bassist and teacher and her mother, Caroline Levine, is a concert violist and teacher. Amy and Bion have three children: Bailey, Henry and Maia. Two of his children currently reside in Austin, Texas. The oldest, Bailey Tsang, moved to Los Angeles, California to pursue a career in Visual Effects or VFX. Having worked at Ingenuity Studios, Digital Domain, FuseFX, AGBO, Evil Eye Pictures and InterPositive, he currently works at Eyeline Studios as a Stage Technical Artist.

== Career ==
Tsang made his debut with conductor Zubin Mehta and the New York Philharmonic Orchestra at age eleven performing the Boccherini Cello Concerto in Avery Fisher Hall, Lincoln Center. He continues to perform internationally as concerto soloist, recitalist, chamber musician and recording artist.

Tsang has been internationally recognized by a number of awards including an Avery Fisher Career Grant and a Bronze Medal in the International Tchaikovsky Competition. He is one of only 6 American cellists to have medaled at the International Tchaikovsky Competition since its inception in 1958. The book 21st Century Cellists devotes one entire chapter to him.

Tsang has given a number of notable premieres including: the U.S. premiere of the George Enescu Symphonie Concertante, the U.S. premiere of Tan Dun Crouching Tiger Concerto for Cello Solo and Chamber Orchestra, and the Boston premiere of the Erich Wolfgang Korngold Cello Concerto. He has appeared on the PBS Great Performances Now Hear This series with Scott Yoo, including “Beethoven’s Ghost” (S2 E4) and “Schumann: Genius and Madness” (S4 E2). With pianist Anton Nel, he recorded the only classical music concert ever performed on the Austin City Limits stage for the Austin PBS series Arts in Context.

Tsang is Professor of Cello and holds the Joe R. & Teresa Lozano Long Chair in Cello at the Sarah and Ernest Butler School of Music at The University of Texas at Austin. He is also currently Head of the Division of Strings at the Butler School. He received the Texas Exes Teaching Award immediately after his first year of service at UT.

== Discography ==
Tsang's official website contains an extensive library of free, downloadable recordings from his live performances. The following commercial recordings by Tsang are also available:

- Cantabile: Bion Tsang, Scott Yoo, Royal Scottish National Orchestra (Universal Music DU42266), 2023
- Bion Tsang: Bach Cello Suites (SONY Classical S80606C), 2021
- Bion Tsang: Dvořák/Enescu Cello Concertos (SONY Classical S80459C), 2019
- Live at Jordan Hall - Dohnányi, Britten, Grieg (BHM Media Productions, ASIN: B07G486K7C), 2018
- Bion Tsang: The Blue Rock Sessions - Inspired by vintage recordings of strings giants Pablo Casals, Jascha Heifetz, Isaac Stern and more (BHM Media Productions, ASIN: B071J8WXF2), 2017
- Live in Concert: Brahms Cello Sonatas and Four Hungarian Dances (Artek AR-0051-2), 2010
- A Company of Voices: Conspirare in Concert (Harmonia Mundi HMU 907534), 2009
- Live in Concert: Beethoven Sonatas and Variations for Cello and Piano (Artek AR-0025-2), 2006
- Strauss / Turina: Quartets for Piano and Strings (Suoni e Colori SC253362), 2004
- Kodaly: Works for Violin and Cello (Suoni e Colori SC253282), 2002
- Schubert / Schumann: Works for Cello and Piano (CAMI 4268), 1991

== Awards and recognition ==
- Grammy Award Nominee, Best Classical Crossover Album, 2009
- Texas Exes Teaching Award, Butler School of Music, The University of Texas at Austin, 2004
- Avery Fisher Career Grant, 1992
- Bronze Medal. IX International Tchaikovsky Competition, 1990
- MEF Career Grant, 1990
- Finalist, Rhodes Scholarship, 1988
- Fifth Prize. VIII International Tchaikovsky Competition, 1986
- Winner, Artists International Award, 1984
- Presidential Scholar in the Arts, Presidential Scholars Program, 1984
- Piatigorsky Memorial Cello Prize, Young Musicians Foundation National Debut Competition, 1982
