= Greatest Hits (Buddy Holly album) =

Greatest hits album by Buddy Holly
- Released: September 24, 1996
- Recorded: 1957, 1958
- Genre: Rock and roll
- Length: 39:54
- Label: MCA (MCAD-11536)

Buddy Holly chronology
The Buddy Holly Collection (1993)	Greatest Hits (1996)	The Very Best of Buddy Holly (1996)

Professional ratings
Review scores
Source	Rating
AllMusic	5/5 stars

Greatest Hits is a compilation album of songs taken from Buddy Holly's three original albums, The "Chirping" Crickets, Buddy Holly and That'll Be the Day, released in 1996 by MCA Records. It includes top ten hits "Peggy Sue" and "Oh, Boy!", along with number-one hit "That'll Be the Day".

== Track listing ==
1. "That'll Be the Day" - 2:17
2. "I'm Looking for Someone to Love" - 1:58
3. "Words of Love" - 1:55
4. "Not Fade Away" - 2:22
5. "Everyday" - 2:08
6. "Oh, Boy!" - 2:08
7. "Peggy Sue" - 2:30
8. "I'm Gonna Love You Too" - 2:14
9. "Maybe Baby" - 2:03
10. "Rave On!" - 1:50
11. "Think It Over" - 1:47
12. "Fool's Paradise" - 2:30
13. "Early in the Morning" - 2:06
14. "It's So Easy" - 2:11
15. "Heartbeat" - 2:09
16. "True Love Ways" - 2:52
17. "It Doesn't Matter Anymore" - 2:05
18. "Raining in My Heart" - 2:49
