= Naxos (company) =

Record label specializing in classical music

Naxos Records
- Founded: 1987
- Genre: Classical, jazz, modern jazz, audiobooks, Audiovisual
- Official website: www.naxosmusicgroup.com

Naxos Music Group comprises numerous companies, divisions, imprints, and labels specializing in classical music but also audiobooks and other genres. The premier label is Naxos Records, which focuses on classical music. Naxos Music Group encompasses about 17 labels including Naxos Records, Ondine, Capriccio, Naxos Audiobooks, and Vox. They distribute a number of additional labels that are independent of the Naxos Musical Group with a wide range of offerings.

The company was founded in 1987 by Klaus Heymann, a German-born resident of Hong Kong. In September 2025, Kuke Music Holding Ltd (OTC:KUKE), a leading classical music services platform in China, acquired a controlling interest in Naxos Music Group for US$106 million. Matthias Lutzweiler was appointed the new CEO in late 2024, after Klaus Heymann stepped down.

== Naxos Records ==
Naxos Records is a record label specializing in classical music. The company was originally known for its budget pricing of discs, with simpler artwork and design than most other labels. In the 1980s, Naxos primarily recorded standard repertoire with central and eastern European symphony orchestras, often with lesser-known conductors, as well as upcoming and unknown musicians, to minimize recording costs and maintain its budget prices. Since then, Naxos has evolved into a mid-priced to full-priced label, known for championing rare repertoire, with many world premiere recordings in its catalogue.

Naxos also took advantage of the expiring copyrights of other companies' studio recordings by selling discs remastered from gramophone records. Released under the Naxos Historical imprint, examples include the complete recordings of opera singers such as Enrico Caruso, Amelita Galli-Curci, and Titta Ruffo and the 1934 world première performance of Howard Hanson's opera Merry Mount. Legal restrictions prevented some of these recordings from being sold in the United States. Naxos has also recorded the music of contemporary composers, including Leonardo Balada, Bechara El-Khoury, Laurent Petitgirard, Alla Pavlova, Michael Daugherty, Kenneth Fuchs, Richard Danielpour and John Corigliano, to name a few. The label has also branched out into jazz, world music, and books on musical subjects.

Artists who have recorded for the label include Leonard Slatkin, Joann Falletta, Marin Alsop, Alexandre Tharaud, Jun Märkl, Boris Giltburg, Tianwa Yang, Gabriel Schwabe, Warren Lee, Ralph van Raat, Takako Nishizaki, Jeno Jando, Vasily Petrenko, and Maria Kliegel.

=== Other sister labels ===
- ARC Music
- belvedere
- Capriccio
- Dynamic
- Grand Piano
- Marco Polo
- Ondine
- Opus Arte
- Prophone
- SWRmusic

== Online streaming services ==
In 2003, it began a paid subscription service for listening on the Internet that offers its complete catalogue. This eventually became the Naxos Music Library. Other online libraries were established in the following years, including Naxos Music Library Jazz, Naxos Music Library World and Naxos Video Library. Naxos Spoken Word Library contains non-music products, such as audiobooks and radio dramas. In 2015, a high-definition download and streaming service, ClassicsOnline HD•LL, with a catalogue drawn from a number of classical record labels, was also launched. Although ClassicsOnline HD•LL was taken down after only a few years, it was a novel and pioneering move at the time.

== Distribution ==
Since 2025, Naxos Music Group has worked with Alpha Trading Solutions GmbH as its logistics partner, after the closure of Naxos Global Logistics. Through Alpha Trading, Naxos Music Group continues to serve the needs of labels and distribution partners involved in physical formats. Naxos Global Logistics, based in Poing near Munich, was founded in 2008 to expand the services offered to its distributed labels, including manufacturing, marketing, and licensing.

The company also has several online retail sites, including ArkivMusic and Naxos Direct stores in Denmark, Norway, Sweden, Germany and the UK. As of mid-2026, the German Naxos Direkt site has been temporarily suspended for service upgrades.

== Awards ==
In 2005, Naxos won the Label of the Year Award at Classic FM/Gramophone awards. In 2023, they won the Label of the Year Award at the International Classical Music Awards (ICMA). Naxos Records and its sister labels have also received countless awards and accolades for their recordings throughout the years, including GRAMMYs, Gramophone Choice Awards, American Record Guide Editor's Choice, OPUS Klassik awards, ICMA, etc.

== See also ==
- Lists of record labels
- Capitol Records, Inc. v. Naxos of America, Inc., 2005 ruling in Capitol Records' favour that US state common law copyright protection is available to pre-1972 recordings.
