= Broadus Erle =

American violinist

Broadus Erle (March 21, 1918 – April 6, 1977) was an American violinist.

Born in Chicago and reared in Toronto, Erle began his violin studies at age 3, taught by his mother, Brownie Earl. (She herself was a violin student of Broadus Farmer, after whom she named her son.) At age 5, he started taking lessons from Pasquale Briglia, concertmaster of the Detroit Symphony Orchestra. By age 6, he was concertizing extensively. He briefly attended the Curtis Institute twice, the first time at age 10, and the second time as a member of the class of 1940. He was also a student at Rollins College, where he was concertmaster of its orchestra. According to Erle, his most important teacher was Alexander Bloch, a violinist, conductor, and composer who was once a student and assistant of Leopold Auer. Erle married Hildegarde Rees on December 24, 1939. They had four children: Robin in 1942, Jacqueline in 1955, Douglas in 1958, and Brian in 1960. They divorced in 1962.

In the 1940s, Erle was concertmaster of the MGM Symphony Orchestra and the Columbia Symphony Orchestra. Along with violist Walter Trampler, cellist Claus Adam, and violinist Matthew Raimondi, Erle formed in 1948 the highly regarded New Music Quartet, which specialized in performing and recording modern music. He was the first violinist in this quartet for 8 years. From 1956 to 1960, he served as concertmaster of the newly founded Japan Philharmonic Orchestra in Tokyo. During this period, he also taught at the Toho School of Music in Tokyo.

Erle became a faculty member in the music school at Yale University in 1960 and made several recordings as first violinist of the Yale Quartet. Erle married violinist Yoko Matsuda in 1966, and subsequently married violinist Syoko Aki in 1968. Both were his former violin students at Yale whom he had met at the Toho School. His other students at Yale have included Marin Alsop, Ralph Evans, Shem Guibbory, Hu Nai-yuan, Takako Nishizaki, Peter Salaff, and Daniel Stepner.

Erle died of cancer at age 59 at his home in Guilford, Connecticut.
