= Yale School of Music =

Professional school at Yale University

Coordinates: 41°18′35.5″N 72°55′35″W

- Coat of arms of the school
- Type: Private
- Established: 1894
- Parent institution: Yale University
- Dean: José García-León
- Location: New Haven, Connecticut, U.S.
- Website: music.yale.edu

The Yale School of Music (often abbreviated to YSM) is one of the 12 professional schools at Yale University. It offers three graduate degrees: Master of Music (MM), Master of Musical Arts (MMA), and Doctor of Musical Arts (DMA), as well as a joint Bachelor of Arts—Master of Music program in conjunction with Yale College, a Certificate in Performance, and an artist diploma.

Yale is the only Ivy League school with a dedicated School of Music; the university also has a separate Department of Music in the Division of Humanities of the Faculty of Arts and Sciences. The School of Music originated in 1855 with a gift of $5,000 from Joseph Battell and conferred its first degrees in 1894; it has a separate endowment, and as a result of a 2005 gift waives tuition and gives students maintenance grants.

José García-León, formerly dean of academic affairs and assessment at Juilliard, succeeded Robert Blocker as dean of the Yale School of Music in fall 2023.

== Buildings ==
- Albert Arnold Sprague Memorial Hall (1917), renovated in 2003.
- Abby and Mitch Leigh Hall (1930), Gothic style, renovated in 2006.
- Hendrie Hall (1895), renovated in 2017.
- Adams Center for Musical Arts (2017). The Adams Center complex includes Hendrie Hall, Leigh Hall, and new space which connects the two.
- Woolsey Hall (1901), used for orchestral performances (Yale Philharmonia) and organ recitals (on the Newberry Memorial Organ).
- The Yale University Collection of Musical Instruments (1895), Romanesque style.

== Notable alumni ==
=== Musicians, artists, leaders ===
- Gisele Ben-Dor, Orchestra conductor
- Matt Brubeck, Cellist, bassist, keyboarder and arranger
- Ronald Crutcher, College President
- Bryce Dessner (B.A. 1998, M.M. 1999), member of The National (band) and collaborator with Taylor Swift, among other artists
- Robert Dick, Lifetime Achievement Award winner flutist
- Dominick DiOrio, Conductor
- Juan Carlos Fernández-Nieto, Pianist
- David Fung – Pianist, faculty at the Manhattan School of Music, Associate Director at the University of British Columbia School of Music, laureate of the Queen Elisabeth Competition and the 12th Arthur Rubinstein International Piano Masters Competition, Tel Aviv (2008), and winner of the 2002 ABC Symphony Australia Young Performer of the Year Award.
- Helen Eugenia Hagan, First African-American woman to graduate and then she became a composer, pianist and music educator
- Paul Jacobs, Grammy Award-winning organist
- Henry-Louis de La Grange, Musicologist and biographer
- Perry Lafferty, Television producer
- Fan Lei, Clarinetist
- Martin Leung, Pianist known as the Video Game Pianist
- Achilles Liarmakopoulos, Trombonist
- Yuri Liberzon, Classical guitarist
- Jahja Ling, Conductor and pianist
- Ruth Muzzy Conniston Morize, Musician and socialite
- Aldo Parisot, Cellist and professor
- Johann Sebastian Paetsch, Cellist and musician
- Joseph W. Polisi, College President
- David Radzynski, Violinist and Concertmaster of the Cleveland Orchestra
- Ravi S. Rajan, College President
- Kay George Roberts, Founder and musical conductor of the New England Orchestra
- Joshua Rosenblum, Conductor, arranger and music journalist
- Willie Ruff, Jazz musician
- Moni Simeonov, Violinist
- Stephen Simon, Conductor and arranger
- Jian Wang, Cellist

=== Vocalists ===
- Janna Baty, Mezzo-soprano opera singer
- Dorothy Bishop, Singer and comedian
- Helen Boatwright, Violinist and musicologist
- Christopher Magiera, Operatic baritone
- Eddie Mayehoff, American actor
- Matthew Polenzani, American Tenor
- Christian Van Horn, American Bass-Baritone

=== Composers ===
- Andy Akiho, Composer
- Timo Andres, Composer and pianist
- Tanya Anisimova, Cellist and Composer
- Daniel Asia, Composer
- Matthew Barnson, Composer
- Robert Beaser, Composer
- Jeremy Beck, Composer
- Marco Beltrami, Academy Award nominated composer and Golden Globe winner
- Howard Boatwright, Composer
- Christopher Cerrone, Composer
- Jacob Cooper, Composer
- Alvin Curran, Composer
- Emma Lou Diemer, Composer
- Reena Esmail, Pianist and composer
- Eugene Friesen, Cellist and Composer
- Michael Gilbertson, Composer
- Judd Greenstein, composer and promoter
- Trevor Gureckis, composer
- Juliana Hall, Composer of art songs and vocal chamber music
- Ted Hearne, Singer and composer
- Aaron Jay Kernis, Grammy Award and 1998 Pulitzer Prize for Music winning composer
- Lori Laitman, Composer
- David Lang, Grammy Award and 2008 Pulitzer Prize for Music winning composer
- Hannah Lash, Composer
- Frank Lewin, Composer
- Peter Scott Lewis, Composer
- Scott Lindroth, Composer
- Missy Mazzoli, Composer and pianist
- Harold Meltzer, Composer
- Andrew Norman, Contemporary classical music composer
- Kevin Puts, 2012 Pulitzer Prize for Music winning composer
- Caroline Shaw, 2013 Pulitzer Prize for Music winning composer
- Sarah Kirkland Snider, Composer
- Pathorn Srikaranonda, Composer
- Jan Swafford, Author and Composer
- Christopher Theofanidis, Composer
- Ken Ueno, Composer

== Faculty ==
- John Adams, Professor of Composition (past)
- Nancy Allen, Professor of Harp (past)
- Emanuel Ax, Visiting Professor of Piano (past)
- Martin Beaver, Artist in Residence (past)
- Boris Berman, Professor of Piano
- Martin Bresnick, Professor of Composition
- Simon Carrington, Professor of Choral Conducting
- Kevin Cobb, Visiting Associate Professor of Trumpet
- Richard Cross (bass-baritone), Professor of Voice (past)
- Allan Dean, Professor of Trumpet (past)
- Jacob Druckman, Professor of Composition (past)
- Lukas Foss, Visiting Professor of Composition (past)
- Claude Frank, Professor of Piano
- Peter Frankl, Professor of Piano
- Erick Friedman, Professor of Violin (past)
- Sidney Harth, Professor of Violin (past)
- Paul Hindemith, Professor of Music (1940–53)
- Fred Hinger, Professor of Timpani & Percussion (past)
- Martin Jean, Professor of Organ
- Betsy Jolas, Visiting Professor of Composition (past)
- Ani Kavafian, Professor of Violin
- Aaron Jay Kernis, Professor of Composition
- Leon Kirchner, Visiting Professor of Composition (1985)
- Ezra Laderman, Professor of Composition (past)
- David Lang, Professor of Composition
- Ingram Marshall, Visiting Professor of Composition (past)
- Donald Martino, Professor of Music Theory (1959–69)
- Robert Mealy, Professor of Violin
- Thomas Murray, Professor of Organ
- Donald Palma, Professor of Double Bass
- Aldo Parisot, Professor of Cello
- Krzysztof Penderecki, Professor of Composition (1973–79)
- Mel Powell, Professor of Composition (1957–69)
- Frederic Rzewski, Visiting Professor of Composition (1984)
- Joseph Schwantner, Professor of Composition (past)
- Charles Seeger, Visiting Professor of the Theory of Music (1949–50)
- David Shifrin, Professor of Clarinet
- Oscar Shumsky, Professor of Violin (past)
- Robert van Sice, Professor of Percussion
- Morton Subotnick, Professor of Composition (past)
- Masaaki Suzuki, Professor of Choral Conducting
- Toru Takemitsu, Visiting Professor of Composition (1975)
- James Taylor (tenor), Professor of Voice - Institute for Sacred Music
- Christopher Theofanidis, Professor of Composition
- Rosalyn Tureck, Visiting Professor of Keyboard (past)
- Paul Watkins, Professor of Cello
- Keith Wilson, Professor of Clarinet (1946–87)
- Ransom Wilson, Professor of Flute (past)
