= List of women classical cellists =

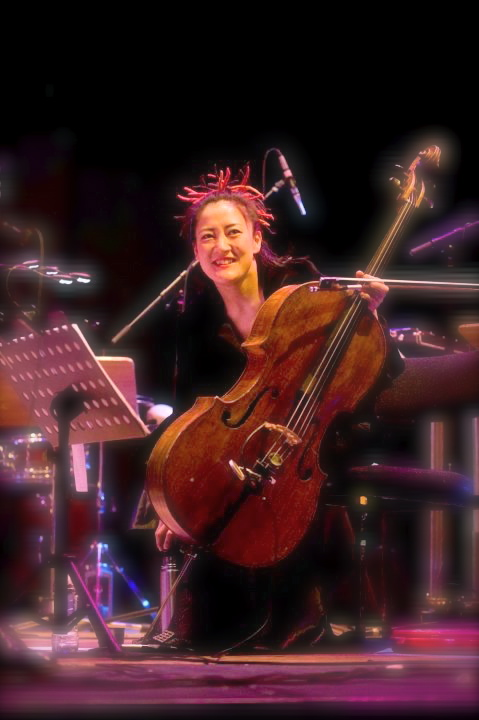
Su-a Lee on stage

The following is a list of women classical cellists by nationality – notable women who are well known for their work in the field of classical music.

== Argentina ==
- Sol Gabetta (born 1981), classical cellist, orchestral performer, recording artist and educator, now resident in Switzerland

== Australia ==
- Christine Jackson (1962–2016), British-born Australian cellist, member of the Australian Chamber Orchestra, played didgeridoo duos

== Belgium ==
- Flavie Van den Hende (1865–1925), Belgian-born and -trained cellist, worked and died in the US

== Canada ==
- Soo Bae (born 1977), Korean-born Canadian cellist now in New York
- Gisela Depkat Canadian cellist, recitalist, instructor, recording artist (Kodaly Solo Sonata, etc.). Recently wrote in Strad Magazine about her famous instructor Georg Neikrug.
- Denise Djokic (born 1980), cellist, soloist and recitalist
- Suzette Forgues Halasz (1918–2004), cellist and musical educator, orchestral principal cellist
- Amanda Forsyth (born 1966), recitalist, soloist and chamber musician
- Ofra Harnoy (born 1965), prominent Israeli-born Canadian cellist, award-winning soloist and recording artist
- Dorothy Lawson (fl. 1990s), cellist, chamber musician and composer based in New York City
- Dáirine Ní Mheadhra (fl. 1990s), Irish-born Canadian cellist, conductor and opera producer
- Zara Nelsova (1918 - 2002), cellist from Winnipeg
- Shauna Rolston (born 1967), child prodigy, recitalist and soloist, educator

== China ==
- Jiaxin Cheng (born 1974), soloist, recitalist and recording artist now based in London, married Julian Lloyd Webber
- Tina Guo (born 1985), Chinese-American cellist, practising classical and modern genres, soloist and recording artist
- Ma Siju (1920–2014), pianist and cellist, recognized educator, retired in 1986

== Czech Republic ==
- Michaela Fukačová (born 1959), award-winning classical cellist

== Ecuador ==
- Teodelinda Terán Hicks (1889–1959), Ecuadorian cellist, trained in London, based in California

== France ==
- Valérie Aimard (born 1969), concert cellist, chamber musician and recording artist
- Martine Bailly (born 1946), classical cellist, first cello of the Orchestre de l'Opéra national de Paris
- Emmanuelle Bertrand (born 1973), award-winning soloist and recording artist
- Lisa Cristiani (1827–1853), classical cellist, one of the first professional female cellists in Europe
- Reine Flachot (1922–1998), international cellist and educator
- Ophélie Gaillard (born 1974), cellist, chamber musician and educator
- Anne Gastinel (born 1971), international cellist, performances from the age of 12, educator
- Astrig Siranossian (born 1988), child prodigy, concert performed, chamber musician and recording artist
- Mathilde Sternat (fl. 1995), chamber musician and arranger
- Agnès Vesterman (fl. 1980s), duet performer, recording artist and educator
- Sonia Wieder-Atherton (born 1961), Franco-American orchestral soloist, chamber musician and recording artist

== Germany ==
- Kristin von der Goltz (born 1966), German-Norwegian cellist, specializing in baroque, chamber musician
- Marie-Elisabeth Hecker (born 1987), award-winning young cellist
- Eva Heinitz (1907–2001), cellist, violist and educator who settled in the United States
- Bettina Hoffmann (born 1959), viola da gambist, cellist, musicologist and educator
- Maria Kliegel (born 1952), cellist, recording artist and educator
- Anita Lasker-Wallfisch (born 1925), cellist, surviving member of the Women's Orchestra in Auschwitz
- Margarethe Quidde (1858–1940), Prussian-born cellist, writer, pacifist in Munich
- Eleonore Schoenfeld (1925–2007), influential 20th-century cellist, recording artist and educator

== Hungary ==
- Rozsi Varady (1902–1933), concert cellist popular in the United States and Europe

== Ireland ==
- Ailbhe McDonagh (born 1982), soloist, chamber musician and composer

== Lithuania ==
- Giedrė Dirvanauskaitė (born 1976), founding member of the Kremerata Baltica chamber orchestra, orchestral concert performer

== Luxembourg ==
- Françoise Groben (1965–2011), cellist playing with many notable orchestras, chamber musician and recording artist

== Netherlands ==
- Josephine van Lier (born 1968), performing cellist specialized in baroque, contemporary and chamber music, residing in Canada
- Mayke Rademakers (fl. 2000s), recitalist, soloist and chamber musician, recording artist

== Norway ==
- Birgitta Elisa Oftestad (born 2002), soloist, chamber musician

== Portugal ==
- Guilhermina Suggia (1885–1950), worked with Pablo Casals in Paris, toured internationally, also chamber musician

== Russia ==
- Tanya Anisimova (born 1966), cellist and composer
- Natalia Gutman (born 1942), soloist, chamber musician, interested in contemporary music
- Nina Kotova (born 1969), recitalist and soloist with major orchestras, educator and recording artist
- Anna Luboshutz (1887–1975), major career in Russia as a soloist and chamber musician
- Natalia Shakhovskaya (1935–2017), award-winning international cellist and educator
- Tatjana Vassiljeva (born 1977), award-winning Russian cellist, appeared with many notable orchestras and toured widely

== Serbia ==
- Maja Bogdanović (born 1982), classical cellist now based in Paris
- Jelena Mihailović (born 1987), classical and contemporary cellist based in Belgrade and Los Angeles

== South Korea ==
- Myung-wha Chung (born 1944), concert cellist, chamber musician and educator, now based in New York City
- Han-na Chang (born 1982), conductor and cellist
- Su-a Lee (fl. 1998), cellist, member of the Scottish Chamber Orchestra, recording artist
- Hee-Young Lim (born 1987), award-winning classical cellist, principal solo cellist with the Rotterdam Philharmonic Orchestra
- Meehae Ryo (born 1967), international soloist and educator

== Sweden ==
- Walborg Lagerwall (1851–1940), toured Scandinavia, cellist at the Royal Swedish Opera

== Switzerland ==
- Anna Kull (1841-1923), first generation of female concert cellists, only performed until age of 19
- [Irene Güdel] (1930-2023), classical concert cellist, taught at Hochschule für Musik Detmold (1957-1995)

== United Kingdom ==
- Natalie Clein (born 1977), classical cellist, chamber musician and recording artist
- Caroline Dale (born 1965), cellist and recording artist
- Marie Dare (1902–1976), Scottish cellist and composer for cello
- Jacqueline du Pré (1945–1987), prominent cellist performing internationally with numerous orchestras, career cut short by multiple sclerosis
- Amaryllis Fleming (1925–1999), classical cellist, chamber musician, Baroque cello performer and educator
- Olga Hegedus (1920–2017), cellist, co-principal of the English Chamber Orchestra
- Louise Hopkins (born 1968), international soloist, broadcaster and educator
- Peggie Sampson (1912–2004), cellist, viola da gambist and educator
- Anna Shuttleworth (1927–2021), cellist and educator
- Amanda Truelove (born 1961), cellist and educator

== United States ==
- Eleanor Aller (1917–1995), cellist, chamber musician and principal cellist in the Warner Bros Studio Orchestra
- Cecylia Barczyk (fl. 1980s), Polish-born American cellist and educator
- Maya Beiser (born 1963), Israeli-born American cellist and producer
- Evangeline Benedetti (born 1941), first female cellist of the New York Philharmonic
- Phoebe Carrai (born 1955), cellist, chamber musician and educator
- Alison Chesley (born 1960), cellist, composer and recording artist
- Kristina Reiko Cooper (fl. 1990s), cellist, solo artist, chamber musician and recording artist
- Nadine Deleury (fl. 1980s), French-born American cellist, chamber opera performer and educator
- Kate Dillingham (fl. 1993), cellist, soloist and chamber musician
- Eileen Folson (1956–2007), composer and cellist
- Raya Garbousova (1909–1997), cellist and educator
- Sarah Gurowitsch (1889–1981), Russian-born American cellist
- Elsa Hilger (1904–2005), Austrian-born American cellist who gave recitals until she was 95
- Mimi Hwang (fl. 1980s), cellist and chamber musician
- Joan Jeanrenaud (born 1956), cellist and recording artist
- Jennifer Kloetzel (fl. 1990s), cellist, solo artist, chamber musician, recording artist and professor
- Maureen May (born 1962), cellist and conductor
- Zara Nelsova (1918–2002), Canadian-born American orchestral cellist and chamber musician who performed from an early age
- Maxine Neuman (born 1948), chamber musician, orchestral cellist and educator
- Sharon Robinson (born 1949), cellist, concert solo artist, chamber musician and recording artist
- Marcy Rosen (fl. 1980s), concerto cellist, chamber musician and educator
- Sara Sant'Ambrogio (born 1962), chamber musician, member of the Eroica Trio, interested in contemporary composers
- Eleonore Schoenfeld (1924–2007), one of the 20th century's most influential cellists
- Eleonore Schoenfeld (born 1993), cellist and concert performer
- Frances-Marie Uitti (born 1948), cellist known for performing contemporary classical music
- Christine Walevska (born 1945), international classical cellist, recording artist and educator
- Wendy Warner (born c. 1972), international orchestral cellist, chamber musician and educator
- Alisa Weilerstein (born 1982), classical cellist, soloist and chamber musician
- Olga Zilboorg (1933–2017), Mexican-born American cellist and educator

== See also ==
- Lists of women in music
- Women in classical music
