= Raymond Yiu =

Chinese composer

Raymond Yiu (Chinese: 姚恩豪; pinyin: Yáo Ēnháo; Cantonese Yale: Yiùh Yānhòuh; born 1973) is a composer, conductor, jazz pianist and music writer.

== Biography ==
Born in Hong Kong, he started piano lessons at the age of four. He went to England in 1990 and now lives in London. He began writing music as a teenager, and took up composing again while he was studying at Imperial College. As a composer, Yiu is mostly self-taught. He received informal consultations from several composers including Julian Anderson, Lukas Foss and David Sawer. He is the recipient of the spnm’s 2003 George Butterworth Award, a Bliss Trust Composer Bursary 2009, and a scholarship from the Guildhall School of Music and Drama, where he completed a doctorate under the supervision of Julian Anderson.

=== 1998 to 2006 ===
Distance of the Moon, scored for eleven solo strings, was conducted by Lukas Foss at the Bridgehampton Music Festival 2001. Three of his works have been shortlisted by the spnm: Tranced Summer-Night, Tranced and Calendar of Tolerable Inventions from Around the World, which was performed by Lontano in 2002, and was subsequently broadcast by BBC Radio 3. It was also chosen by Sir Harrison Birtwistle for performance at the 2003 Huddersfield Contemporary Music Festival with the London Sinfonietta. Tranced was performed by the Northern Sinfonia at the 2003 Bath Festival and was presented as a dance piece at the Österreichisches Theatermuseum, Vienna, with choreography by Bernd Bienert.

Beyond the Glass, performed and recorded for broadcast by the BBC Singers, was nominated for the BASCA British Composer Awards 2004. A Whorl of Knowings Dim and Bright was premièred by Andrew Watts at the Cheltenham Music Festival 2004. Night Shanghai, premièred by Lontano in 2005 in London, has been performed by groups including Concorde Ensemble, Chroma and Ensemble 10/10.

=== 2006 - The Original Chinese Conjuror ===
It began life as part of the Genesis Opera Project 2 (GOP2), supported by The Genesis Foundation, The Original Chinese Conjuror, with a libretto by Lee Warren, was one of the six projects chosen for development out of the 200-plus proposals. Although it was not selected as one of the three projects to be fully developed following a workshop performance of a selection of scenes in 2003, it attracted the attention of various opera companies, and it was eventually commissioned by Aldeburgh Almeida Opera (with the support of Genesis Foundation) for the 2006 Aldeburgh Festival and the Almeida Opera Season.

Subtitled A Musical Diversion Suggested by the Lives of Chung Ling Soo, The Original Chinese Conjuror was based on the real-life story of William Ellsworth Robinson, a.k.a. Chung Ling Soo, It was an experiment to combine different theatrical protocols into an integrated whole. It consists of twelve scenes, and scored for five singers and a band of six instrumentalists. All six performances during its initial run at the Aldeburgh Festival and Almeida Theatre were sold out.

=== 2008 to 2013 ===
2008 saw the premières of Faerie Tales, a Celebrating English Song commission, and Xocolatl, written for the London Symphony Orchestra as part of the 2008 Panufnik Young Composer Scheme. Maomao Yü, a quintet scored for piano and four traditional Chinese instruments - erhu, pipa, yangqin and guzheng - was commissioned by LSO UBS Soundscapes, and premiered by Lang Lang (pianist) and the Silk String Quartet with the composer conducting in April 2009. His second Celebrating English Song commission, "Dead Letters", was premiered in July 2010, and "The Earth and Every Common Sight", for soprano and piano, won the Tracey Chadwell Memorial Prize 2010.

His first major orchestral work, The London Citizen Exceedingly Injured, written for the BBC Symphony Orchestra, was premiered by the orchestra under the baton of Yu Long in January 2013. It was nominated in the orchestral category of the BASCA British Composer Awards 2013.

A new production of The Original Chinese Conjuror by Teatro Barocco took place at Musikverein in Vienna, April 2013.

=== BASCA British Composer Awards 2010 ===
"Northwest Wind", a quintet for flute, clarinet, harp, viola and double bass to mark the 20th anniversary of the Tiananmen Square Protests of 1989, was written for and premiered by Lontano. It won the chamber category of the BASCA British Composer Awards 2010.

=== BBC Proms 2015 ===
"Symphony" for counter-tenor and symphony orchestra - inspired by a poem by Basil Bunting and setting texts by Walt Whitman, Constantine P. Cavafy, Thom Gunn and John Donne - was given its world premiere by Andrew Watts, BBC Symphony Orchestra and Edward Gardner on 25 August 2015 as part of The Proms 2015. It was commissioned by the BBC.

=== Manchester International Festival 2017 / Royal Philharmonic Society Music Awards Nomination 2018 ===
The International Anthony Burgess Foundation commissioned "The World Was Once All Miracle" for baritone and symphony orchestra - setting of six poems by Anthony Burgess - to celebrate the centenary of the birth of the Manchester-born writer. The orchestral song cycle was given its world premiere by Roderick Williams, BBC Philharmonic and Michael Francis (conductor) on 4 July 2017 as part of Manchester International Festival 2017. Its London premiere was given by Williams, BBC Symphony Orchestra under the baton of Sir Andrew Davis on 13 April 2018. This work was nominated in the large-scale composition category of the 2018 Royal Philharmonic Society Music Awards.

=== Violin Concerto (2024) ===
On 20 March 2024 his Violin Concerto received its world premiere at the Barbican Centre in London. Co-commissioned by the BBC Symphony Orchestra, the Hong Kong Philharmonic Orchestra and the Seattle Symphony, the concerto was composed for the soloist Esther Yoo, and was inspired by the life of the Chinese violinist Ma Sicong, who was forced to emigrate to the USA during China's Cultural Revolution. Themes from Ma Sicong's Inner Mongolia Suite are threaded through the concerto.

=== Professor in Composition, Royal Northern College of Music ===
Yiu was appointed as a Professor in Composition at the Royal Northern College of Music in Manchester.

=== Schott Music ===
In January 2026, it was announced that a collection of Yiu's works were added to the catalogue of the German music publisher Schott Music.

== Selected works ==
=== Orchestral ===
- Violin Concerto (2018–24)
- Old Bei (2020, rev. 2024)
- The World Was Once All Miracle (2016–17) for baritone and symphony orchestra
- Butorflēoge (2016) for flute and string orchestra
- Oslo - Hommage à Lukas Foss (2011/17) for string orchestra
- The Stars and Stripes Forever (2016) for symphony orchestra
- Symphony (2014–15) for counter-tenor and symphony orchestra
- The London Citizen Exceedingly Injured (2012) for symphony orchestra - shortlisted for the BASCA British Composer Awards 2013 orchestral category
- Xocolatl (2008) for symphony orchestra
- Tranced (1999) for symphony orchestra

=== Ensemble ===
- Ink Garden (2013) for concert brass band
- Night Shanghai (2005) for six players
- Distance of the Moon (2000–01) for eleven solo strings

=== Chamber ===
- Les Etoiles au Front (2012) for clarinet, accordion and string trio - shortlisted for the BASCA British Composer Awards 2012 chamber category
- Oslo - Hommage à Lukas Foss (2011) for string quintet
- Jieshi (2011) for qin and string quartet
- Tubae Fori (2010) for two trumpets, horn, trombone and tuba
- Suite from "The Original Chinese Conjuror" (2010) for clarinet, accordion, piano, violin and double bass
- Oslo (2010) for hanghang, bass clarinet, viola and cello
- Northwest Wind (2010) for flute, clarinet, harp, viola, double bass - winner of the BASCA British Composer Awards 2010 chamber category
- Yi (2010) for string quartet
- Maomao Yü (2009) for piano, erhu, pipa, yangqin and guzheng
- Jewelled Elephant Syndrome (2006) for clarinet, cello and piano
- Eyes to See Otherwise (2003) for string trio
- Istori Paraleloak (2002) for saxophone quartet
- Calendar of Tolerable Inventions from Around the World (2001-) for wind quintet
- Tranced Summer-Night (1998–99) for string quartet

=== Choral ===
- We Saw Thee (2017) for female chorus a cappella
- Fariest Isle (2015) for mezzo-soprano, chorus and symphony orchestra
- Gersui (2014) for female chorus a cappella
- The Timeless Way of Cities (2011) for three mixed choruses a cappella
- Mielo (2011) for female chorus a cappella
- Beyond the Glass (2003) for SATB a cappella - shortlisted for the BASCA British Composer Awards 2004 choral category

=== Vocal ===
- The Names of the Earth' (2025) for soprano and piano
- Chinese Whispers' (2025) for countertenor solo
- Three Songs from 'Voices of London' (2012) for mezzo-soprano, tenor, baritone and piano
- Sonnet (2011) for baritone and piano
- Dead Letters (2010) for tenor and piano
- The Earth and Every Common Sight (2010) for soprano and piano - winner of the 2010 Tracey Chadwell Memorial Prize
- My Fatal Plurality (2010) for tenor, baritone and string quartet
- Faerie Tales (2008) for counter tenor, tenor and piano
- A Whorl of Knowings Dim and Bright (2004) for counter tenor solo
- Forget-Me-Not (2003) for high voice and piano

=== Instrumental ===
- And Nights Bright Days (2017) for dizi solo
- Elegiac Fragments (2011) for viola solo
- Black Wings (2008) for celesta or piano
- on voit passer des torses (2005) for trumpet Bb and piano (published by Faber Music in "Fingerprints - Trumpet")
- En la Confitería Ideal (2005) for trumpet Bb and piano (published by Stainer & Bell in "The Light Touch, Book II")
- … as the sun rose, as the day sank (2005) for trumpet Bb and piano (published by Stainer & Bell in "The Light Touch, Book I")
- podskok (2002) for piano (published by ABRSM in "Spectrum 4")

=== Stage works ===
- Strange Shores (2015) – Incidental Music to Transport Production of The Edge
- Elegiac Fragments (2011) – Incidental Music to Transport Production of Elegy
- A Midsummer Night's Dream (2009) – Incidental Music
- The Original Chinese Conjuror, a Musical Diversion Suggested by the Lives of Chung Ling Soo (2003–06)

== Articles ==
- Symphony: An interview with Raymond Yiu - Reggie Myers, Vada, 25 August 2015
- From Hong Kong to John Donne to 1970s disco: Raymond Yiu on his composing influences - Petroc Trelawny, New Statesman, 24 August 2015
- Composer Raymond Yiu conjures up his debut symphony for BBC Proms - Michael White, Ham and High, 23 August 2015
- Symphony by composer Raymond Yiu – BBC Proms - Nee Hao, 21 August 2015
- Raymond Yiu writes his memories of the London gay scene and AIDS into his music - Ellen Johnson, Gay Times, 16 August 2015
- Behind the Symphony - Adam Duxbury, Winq, p. 74-75, August/September 2015
- Raymond Yiu’s Symphony to debut at BBC Proms - Reggie Myers, Vada, 12 August 2015
- Tansy Davies: Re-Greening | Raymond Yiu: Symphony | Pluse August’s New Music - Katy Wright, Classical Music, August 2015
- Guillaume Tell opera rape outcry is over offence to music, not women - Zoe Williams, The Guardian, 3 July 2015
- Honourable Second - Tobias Fischer, Tokafi, 8 July 2013
- Musical Dim Sum: Composer Raymond Yiu announces two concerts - Nee Hao, 25 June 2013
- Songs of Experience - Nee Hao, 17 January 2013
- Sounds and Sweet Airs That Give Delight - Gramophone, 4 January 2013
- From Circuits to Symphonies - The World of Chinese, October 2012
- First Person: Another Country - International Arts Manager, Volume 8, No. 8, September/October 2012
- Secluded Orchid in Jieshi Mode - Dimsum, 4 June 2011
- Award Winning Composer Raymond Yiu - Nee Hao, 20 May 2011
- Arts Happenings: Raymond Yiu awarded British Composers Award - RTHK4 Fine Music Magazine, January 2011
- Northwest Wind - Dimsum, 4 December 2010
- 港人揚威英國古典樂壇 - 東方日報, 2 December 2010
- What did a real conjuror think of The Original Chinese Conjuror? - Jon Robinson, The Guardian, 5 July 2006
- Conjuring up opera magic at Aldeburgh - Ivan Hewett, The Daily Telegraph, 8 June 2006
- How not to catch a bullet - Lyn Gardner, The Guardian, 9 June 2006

== Reviews ==
- The World Was Once All Miracle review – Anthony Burgess's musical powers - Andrew Clements (The Guardian, 6 July 2017)
- Concert review: BBC Philharmonic/ Francis at Bridgewater Hall, Manchester - Neil Fisher (The Times, 6 July 2017)
- Centenary Tribute to Musical Wordsmith - Tim Mottershead (Remotegoat, 5 July 2017)
- Prom 54: BBC SO / Gardner - Sam Smith (MusicOMH, 27 August 2015)
- Prom 54: Andrew Watts and Emily Beynon create deep impressions in two Proms premières - David Truslove (Bachtrack, 27 August 2015)
- Prom 54: BBCSO/Gardner - Geoff Brown (The Times, 27 August 2015)
- Prom 54: Magical, moving premiere in the spirit of Mahler - John Allison (The Telegraph, 26 August 2015)
- BBC Proms 2015: BBC Symphony Orchestra/Gardner: A rousing blast of brilliant brass - Barry Millington (Evening Standard, 26 August 2015)
- BBCSO/Gardner review – poetic rendering of loss and remembering - Andrew Clements (The Guardian, 26 August 2015)
- Prom 54: BBC Symphony Orchestra/Edward Gardner - Colin Anderson (Classical Source, 26 August 2015)
- LSO Futures, Barbican, Review - Ivan Hewett (The Telegraph, 15 April 2013)
- LSO/Roth - George Hall (The Guardian, 15 April 2013)
- LSO Futures conducted by François-Xavier Roth - Colin Anderson (Classical Source, 13 April 2013)
- The London Citizen Exceedingly Injured - Ivan Hewett (The Telegraph, 21 January 2013)
- The London Citizen Exceedingly Injured - Tim Ashley (Guardian, 21 January 2013)
- The London Citizen Exceedingly Injured - Colin Anderson (Classical Source, 18 January 2013)
- William Berger: Insomnia (CD Review) - Tim Ashley (Guardian, 9 August 2012)
- Nicholas Mulroy at Tardebigge Church - Christopher Morley (Birmingham Post, 30 July 2010)
- A new soundtrack to Shakespeare at the Guildhall School - Michael White (The Telegraph, 5 December 2009)
- Ensemble 10/10 – Celebrating the Year of the Ox - Glyn Môn Hughes (Classical Source, 24 January 2009)
- The Original Chinese Conjuror - Andrew Clements (The Guardian, 17 June 2006)
- It's the magic that does the trick - Ivan Hewett (The Daily Telegraph, 19 June 2006)
- The Original Chinese Conjuror - Robert Maycock (The Independent, 22 June 2006)
- Mozart stands up for the sweatshop boy - Anthony Holden (The Observer, 9 July 2006)

== Radio/TV ==
- Through the Night: Proms 2015 - Britten, Raymond Yiu, Nielsen and Janácek from the BBC Symphony Orchestra - BBC Radio 3, 9 July 2016
- Proms 2015 Repeats: Prom 54 - Britten, Raymond Yiu, Nielsen and Janácek - BBC Radio 3, 10 September 2015
- Raymond Yiu: Symphony - BBC Radio 3, 25 August 2015
- Prom 54 (part 1): Britten, Raymond Yiu, Nielsen and Janacek - BBC Radio 3, 25 August 2015
- In Tune - BBC Radio 3, 24 August 2015
- Symphony promotes awareness of HIV and AIDS - London Live, 24 August 2015
- Raymond Yiu in Tim Lihoreau's Wednesday Web Chat - Classic FM, 3 July 2013
- Radio Live in Concert: The London Citizen Exceedingly Injured - BBC Radio 3, 18 January 2013
- Hear and Now: British Composer Awards 2012 - BBC Radio 3, 1 December 2012
- In Tune - BBC Radio 3, 25 October 2012
- One to One - BBC Radio 4, 9 October 2012
- Hear and Now: Northwest Wind - BBC Radio 3, 26 May 2012
- The Choir - BBC Radio 3, 9 October 2011
- British Composer Awards 2010 - BBC Radio 3, 1 December 2010
- 今日專題：專訪英國作曲家獎得主姚恩豪 - RTHK4, 8 December 2010
- Pre-Hear: Calendar of Tolerable Inventions from Around the World - BBC Radio 3, 30 August 2008
- Music Matters: The Original Chinese Conjuror - BBC Radio 3, 11 June 2006
- Pre-Hear: Beyond the Glass - BBC Radio 3, 3 September 2005
- Hear and Now - BBC Radio 3, 16 November 2002

== Writings ==
- An unceasing appetite for exploration: Raymond Yiu on Julian Anderson – Classical Music, March 2016 issue p. 28 – 29
- Renaissance Man: a Portrait of Lukas Foss – Tempo magazine, July 2002 issue, p. 15 – 32
- Lukas Foss - LSO Panufnik Young Composer Scheme 2008 Blog
- Soapbox: Elizabeth Maconchy - Sound and Music
- Richard Baker - LSO Panufnik Young Composer Scheme 2008 Blog
