= Abortifacient =

Chemical substances that can terminate a pregnancy

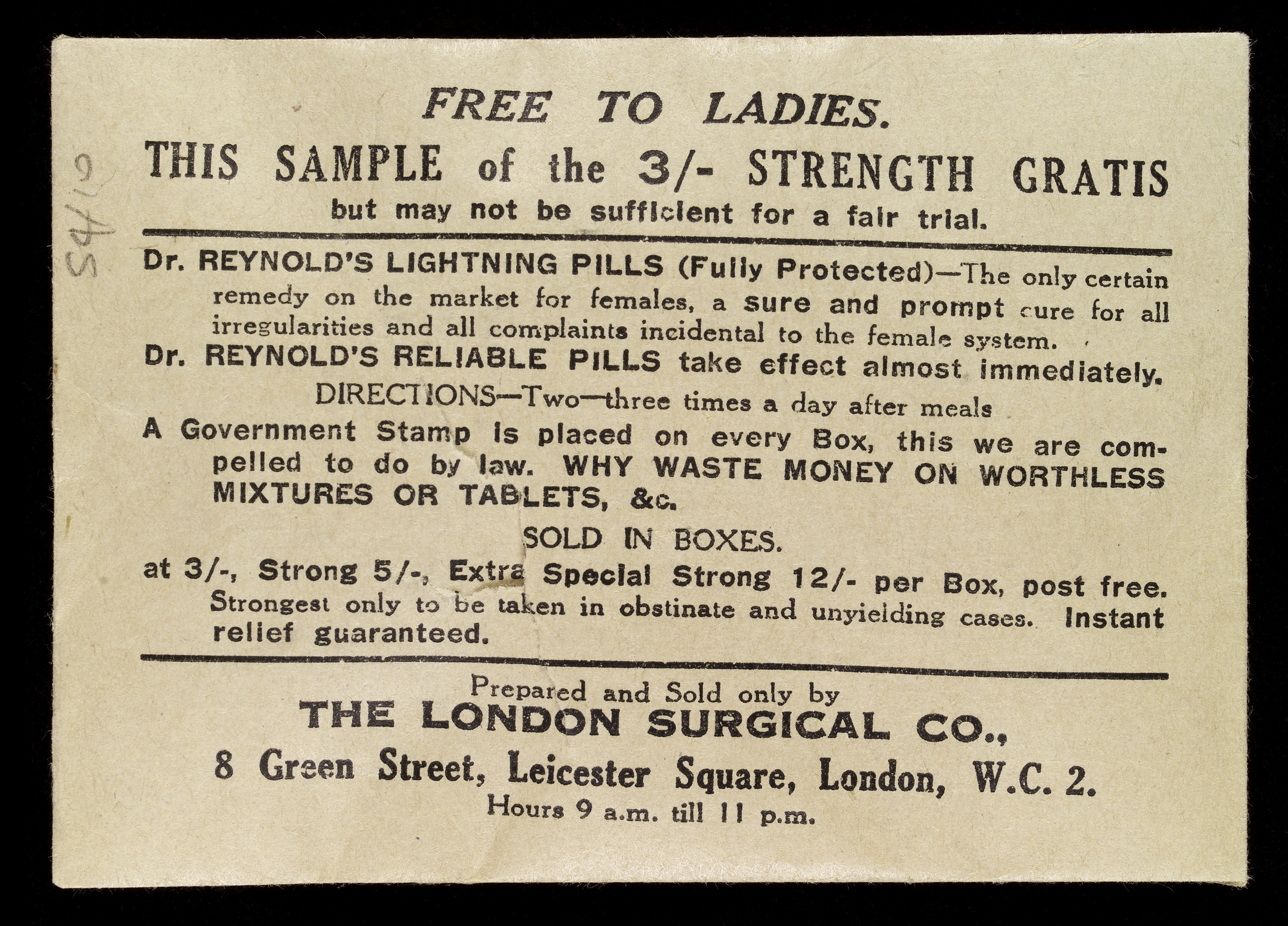
A historical advertisement for "Dr. Reynold's Lightning Pills". The advertisement uses coded language to refer to the pills' supposed abortifacient properties, including its ability to resolve female "irregularities."

An abortifacient ("that which will cause a miscarriage" from Latin: abortus "miscarriage" and faciens "making") is a substance that induces abortion. This is a nonspecific term which may refer to any number of substances or medications, ranging from herbs to prescription medications.

Common abortifacients used in performing medical abortions include mifepristone, which is typically used in conjunction with misoprostol in a two-step approach. Synthetic oxytocin, which is routinely used safely during term labor, is also commonly used to induce abortion in the second or third trimester.

For thousands of years, writers in many parts of the world have described and recommended herbal abortifacients to women who seek to terminate a pregnancy, although their use may carry risks to the health of the woman.

== Medications ==
Because "abortifacient" is a broad term used to describe a substance's effects on pregnancy, there is a wide range of drugs that can be described as abortifacients or as having abortifacient properties.

The most commonly recommended medication regimen for intentionally inducing abortion involves the use of mifepristone followed by misoprostol one to two days later. The use of these medications for the purpose of ending a pregnancy has been extensively studied, and has been shown to be both effective and safe with fewer than 0.4% of patients needing hospitalization to treat an infection or to receive a blood transfusion. This combination is approved for use up to 10 weeks' gestation (70 days after the start of the last menstrual period).

Other drugs with abortifacient properties can have multiple uses. Both synthetic oxytocin (Pitocin) and dinoprostone (Cervidil, Prepidil) are routinely used during healthy, term labor. Pitocin is used to induce and strengthen contractions, and Cervidil is used to prepare the cervix for labor by inducing softening and widening of this opening to the uterus. When used this way, neither medication is considered an abortifacient. However, the same drugs can be used to induce an abortion, particularly after 12 weeks of pregnancy. Misoprostol (discussed above) is also used to treat peptic ulcers in patients who have had gastric or intestinal damage from use of NSAIDs. Because its use in treatment of ulcers makes it easier to access, misoprostol alone is sometimes used for self-induced abortion in countries or regions where legal abortion is not available or readily accessible.

Not all abortifacient agents are taken with the intention to end a pregnancy. Methotrexate, a drug often used for management of rheumatoid arthritis, can induce abortion. For this reason contraception is often advised while using methotrexate for management of a chronic condition.

=== Dangers of abortifacient herbs ===
Sometimes herbs or herbal medicines are used in an attempt to induce abortion; use of such substances as abortifacients is dangerous, can cause serious— even lethal— side effects, and is not recommended by physicians. In general, a dose sufficient to be effective poses a risk to the mother because of potential liver and kidney damage; failed attempts may require a follow-up clinical abortion because the uterus did not evacuate completely.

Modern users often lack knowledge of the traditional methods of preparation and use of these substances. The historian John M. Riddle called these circumstances a "broken chain of knowledge", one he attributed to the historic persecution of women acting as witches, midwives, or wisewomen who had knowledge of such practices.

== History ==
The medical literature of classical antiquity often refers to pharmacological means of abortion; abortifacients are mentioned, and sometimes described in detail, in the works of Aristotle, Caelius Aurelianus, Celsus, Dioscorides, Galen, Hippocrates, Oribasius, Paul of Aegina, Pliny, Theodorus Priscianus, Soranus of Ephesus, and others.

In ancient Babylonian texts, scholars have described multiple written prescriptions or instructions for ending pregnancies. Some of these instructions were explicitly for ingesting ingredients to end a pregnancy, whereas other cuneiform texts discuss the ingestion of ingredients to return a missed menstrual period (which is used repeatedly throughout history as a coded reference to abortion).

"To make a pregnant woman lose her foetus: ...Grind nabruqqu plant, let her drink it with wine on an empty stomach, [then her foetus will be aborted]."

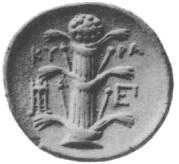
Ancient silver coin from Cyrene depicting a stalk of Silphium

The ancient Greek colony of Cyrene at one time had an economy based almost entirely on the production and export of the plant silphium, which had uses ranging from food to a salve for feral dog bites. It was also considered a powerful abortifacient used to "purge the uterus". Silphium figured so prominently in the wealth of Cyrene that the plant appeared on coins minted there.

In the Bible's Book of Numbers, the ordeal of the bitter water describes how an ancient Jewish husband could accuse his wife of being unfaithful, subjecting her to a public test. The wife was made to drink a concoction which, if she was guilty, caused physical damage to her reproductive organs. Biblical scholars debate whether this involved the abortion or miscarriage of a pregnancy, or whether she was rendered infertile. The Biblical scholar Tikva Frymer-Kensky has disputed the interpretation that the ordeal of the bitter water referred to the use of abortifacients.

The medieval Islamic physician Ibn Sina documented various birth control practices, including the use of rue as an abortifacient. Similarly, 11th-century physician Constantine the African described multiple abortifacient herbs, which he classified by order of their intensity, starting with abortifacients that had weaker effects on the body and ending with the most potent substances.

Carl Linnaeus, known as the "father of botany", listed five abortifacients in his 1749 Materia medica. According to the historian of science Londa Schiebinger, in the 17th and 18th centuries "many sources taken together – herbals, midwifery manuals, trial records, Pharmacopoeia, and Materia medica – reveal that physicians, midwives, and women themselves had an extensive knowledge of herbs that could induce abortion." Schiebinger further writes that "European exploration in the West Indies yielded about a dozen known abortifacients."

For Aboriginal people in Australia, plants such as giant boat-lip orchid (Cymbidium madidum), quinine bush (Petalostigma pubescens), or blue-leaved mallee (Eucalyptus gamophylla) were ingested, inserted into the body, or were smoked with Cooktown ironwood (Erythrophleum chlorostachys).

Historically, the First Nations people of eastern Canada used Sanguinaria canadensis (bloodwort) and Juniperus virginiana to induce abortions.

According to Virgil Vogel, a historian of the indigenous societies of North America, the Ojibwe used blue cohosh (Caulophyllum thalictroides) as an abortifacient, and the Quinault used thistle for the same purpose. The appendix to Vogel's book lists red cedar (Juniperus virginiana), American pennyroyal (Hedeoma pulegioides), tansy, Canada wild ginger (Asarum canadense), and several other herbs as abortifacients used by various North American Indian tribes. The anthropologist Daniel Moerman wrote that calamus (Acorus calamus), which was one of the ten most common medicinal drugs of Native American societies, was used as an abortifacient by the Lenape, Cree, Mohegan, Sioux, and other tribes; and he listed more than one hundred substances used as abortifacients by Native Americans.

Following a tradition among European and English authors, colonial Americans were advised by Benjamin Franklin to use careful measurements in his recipe for an abortifacient that he used as an example in a book he published to teach mathematics and many useful skills.

The historian Angus McLaren, writing about Canadian women between 1870 and 1920, states that "A woman would first seek to 'put herself right' by drinking an infusion of one of the traditional abortifacients, such as tansy, quinine, pennyroyal, rue, black hellebore, ergot of rye, sabin, or cotton root."

During the American slavery period, 18th and 19th centuries, cotton root bark was used in folk remedies to induce a miscarriage.

In the late 19th century, women in the UK and US increasingly ingested lead to abort pregnancies, sometimes in the form of pills made of diachylon or lead plaster. It would often cause the women to become ill and could kill them.

In the 19th century Madame Restell provided mail-order abortifacients and surgical abortion to pregnant clients in New York.

Early 20th-century newspaper advertisements included coded advertisements for abortifacient substances which would solve menstrual "irregularities". Between 1919 and 1934 the U.S. Department of Agriculture issued legal restraints against fifty-seven "feminine hygiene products" including "Blair's Female Tablets" and "Madame LeRoy's Regulative Pills."
