= Varady =

Varady or Várady is a surname. Notable people with the surname include:

- Andreas Varady (born 1997), Slovak Hungarian jazz guitarist
- Béla Várady (1953–2014), Hungarian footballer
- Corrin Varady, Australian journalist
- Jenő Várady (1899–?), Hungarian rower
- Júlia Várady (born 1941), German opera singer
- Krista Varady, Canadian-American nutrition researcher
- Rozsi Varady (1902–1933), Hungarian-American cellist
- Tibor Várady (born 1939), Professor of Law

== See also ==
- Varadi
