= Hellerstein =

Hellerstein is a surname. Notable people with the surname include:

- Alvin Hellerstein (1933–2026), American judge
- Joseph M. Hellerstein (born 1968), American computer scientist
- Judith K. Hellerstein (fl. 1990s–2020s), American economist
- Kathryn Hellerstein (born 1952), American academic
- Lynn Hellerstein (fl. 1990s–2020s), American optometrist, speaker, and author
- Marc Hellerstein, American physician-scientist
- Walter Hellerstein (born 1946), American legal scholar
