= L. W. Sumner =

Canadian philosopher (born 1941)

L. W. Sumner FRSC
- Born: Leonard Wayne Sumner; May 18, 1941 (age 85)
- Awards: Molson Prize

Education
- Education: Princeton University

Philosophical work
- Institutions: University of Toronto
- Main interests: Law and philosophy

Leonard Wayne Sumner FRSC (born 18 May 1941) is a Canadian philosopher notable for his work on normative and applied ethics, political philosophy, and the philosophy of law. Sumner is University Professor Emeritus of Law and Philosophy at the University of Toronto.

== Education and career ==
Educated at the University of Toronto Schools, Sumner received his bachelor's degree from the University of Toronto in 1962 and his doctoral degree from Princeton University in 1965, with a thesis supervised by Stuart Hampshire and Joel Feinberg.

Since 2002, he has been a University Professor, the highest academic honour that the university accords its faculty. In 1990 he was elected a fellow of the Royal Society of Canada. In 2009 he was awarded the Molson Prize by the Canada Council for the Arts.

== Philosophical work ==
Sumner is the author of four books, including Welfare, Happiness and Ethics.

== Selected bibliography ==
=== Books ===
- Sumner, L.W. (1981). Abortion and moral theory. Princeton, New Jersey: Princeton University Press. ISBN 9780691072623.
- Sumner, L.W. (1987). The moral foundations of rights. New York: Oxford University Press. ISBN 9780198247517.
- Sumner, L.W. (1996). Welfare, happiness and ethics. New York: Oxford University Press. ISBN 9780198244400.
- Sumner, L.W. (2004). The hateful and the obscene: studies in the limits of free expression. Toronto: University of Toronto Press. ISBN 9780802042392.

=== Chapters in books ===
- Sumner, L.W. (1978), "Classical utilitarianism and the population optimum", in Sikora, R.I.; Barry, Brian (eds.), Obligations to future generations, Philadelphia: Temple University Press, pp. 91–111, ISBN 9781874267317.
- Sumner, L.W. (2000), "Something in between", in Crisp, Roger; Hooker, Brad (eds.), Well-being and morality: essays in honour of James Griffin, Oxford New York: Clarendon Press Oxford University Press, pp. 1–19, ISBN 9780198235842.
- Sumner, L.W. (2005), "Hate crimes, literature, and speech", in Frey, R.G.; Heath Wellman, Christopher (eds.), A companion to applied ethics, Blackwell Companions to Philosophy, Oxford, UK Malden, Massachusetts: Blackwell Publishing, pp. 89–101, doi:10.1002/9780470996621.ch11, ISBN 9781405133456.

=== Journal articles ===
- Sumner, L.W. (May 1976). "A matter of life and death". Noûs. 10 (2). Wiley: 145–171. doi:10.2307/2214573. JSTOR 2214573.
