= Krista Varady =

Canadian-American scientist

- Born: Guelph, Ontario, Canada
- Education: University of Guelph (BS) McGill University (PhD) University of California, Berkeley (Postdoc)
- Occupation: Professor of Nutrition
- Known for: Research on Intermittent Fasting
- Website: https://ahs.uic.edu/profiles/varady-krista/

Krista A. Varady is a Canadian-American scientist known for her studies of intermittent fasting on chronic disease risk in human subjects. Varady was one of the first scientists to study intermittent fasting in humans. She is a professor of nutrition at the University of Illinois Chicago (UIC) in the department of Kinesiology and Nutrition. She also serves as the director of the Human Nutrition Research Center at UIC. Her work is primarily funded by the National Institutes of Health. She is also the co-author of two books about intermittent fasting for the general public, titled The Every Other Day Diet and The Fastest Diet.

== Education ==
Varady completed her Bachelor's degree in dietetics at the University of Guelph. She then attended McGill University, where she completed her PhD in human nutrition. Her PhD dissertation examined the effects of plant sterols combined with exercise on cholesterol metabolism. After her PhD, she joined the laboratory of Marc Hellerstein at the University of California, Berkeley, to study intermittent fasting.

== Research Contributions ==
Alternate day fasting studies

Krista Varady has conducted clinical research on alternate day fasting (ADF) as an approach to weight management. Her randomized trials have examined ADF's effects on body weight, body composition, cardiovascular risk, and diabetes risk factors in adults with obesity. In addition, her research has compared the efficacy of ADF to daily calorie restriction for weight loss.

Time restricted eating studies

Varady's research has also investigated time-restricted eating (TRE) as an alternative to conventional calorie restriction diets for weight management. Her randomized clinical trials have examined eating windows ranging from approximately 4 to 8 hours. Her work found that TRE can promote weight loss, in part, through spontaneous reductions in energy intake, without requiring calorie counting. Her work has also investigated the effects of TRE in adults with obesity, diabetes, and polycystic ovary syndrome (PCOS).

== Honors ==
In 2025, she received the Blackburn Award for Excellence in obesity medicine, from the Obesity Society. In 2024, she received the E.V. McCollum Award from the American Society of Nutrition. In 2023 she received the University of Illinois Chicago, Distinguished Researcher of the Year in the Clinical Sciences Award, and in 2017 she received the Mead Johnson Young Investigator Award from the American Society for Nutrition for her work in intermittent fasting.

== Works ==
- Varady, Krista; Gottlieb, Bill (2013). The Every Other Day Diet: the diet that lets you eat all you want (half the time) and keep the weight off. New York, NY: Hyperion. ISBN 978-0-316-33058-9. OCLC 865473722.
- Black, Victoria; Davidson, Gen; Varady, Krista (November 28, 2023). The Fastest Diet. Macmillan. ISBN 978-1-76126-332-3. OCLC 1402181219.
