= Molson Prize =

Canadian award

The Thomas Henry Pentland Molson Prize for the Arts is awarded by the Canada Council for the Arts. Two prizes are awarded annually to distinguished individuals. One prize is awarded in the arts, one in the social sciences and humanities. The prizes are $50,000 each, and intended to encourage continuing contribution to the cultural and intellectual heritage of Canada.

== Endowment ==
Funded by an endowment from the Molson Foundation, the prizes are administered by the Canada Council for the Arts in cooperation with the Social Sciences and Humanities Research Council of Canada. Laureates are chosen by a peer assessment committee appointed jointly by the Canada Council and the Social Sciences and Humanities Research Council of Canada.

== Eligibility ==
Candidates must be Canadian citizens or permanent residents of Canada. To be nominated, candidates must have made a substantial and distinguished contribution over a significant period of time. In the words of the deed of gift, the prizes are intended "to encourage Canadians of outstanding achievement in the fields of the Arts, the Humanities or the Social Sciences to make further contribution to the cultural or intellectual heritage of Canada". The terms of reference are interpreted as follows:

- outstanding achievement must have already been amply demonstrated
- further contribution implies that the laureates should still be very active and productive.

In other words, the prize is not intended as an "end of service" reward or as recognition for one great accomplishment. Past assessment committees have been quite consistent in choosing laureates who are close to the top of an outstanding career. Corporations and other organizations are excluded from consideration, as are posthumous awards. No individual may be awarded the prize more than once. The prizes are accessible to qualified persons from Aboriginal Peoples and diverse cultural and regional communities. Members of the board of the Canada Council for the Arts and the Social Sciences and Humanities Research Council are not eligible to be considered for this prize during the course of their terms as members nor for six months following the end of their term.

== Nomination process ==
Candidates may not apply for the Canada Council for the Arts Molson Prizes on their own behalf. They must be nominated by three individuals or three organizations, or a combination of individuals and organizations. Nominations are sought from persons and organizations that have the interest and capacity to nominate appropriate individuals. Nominators may submit one letter signed by the three nominating individuals or organizations, or submit three separate letters of nomination. Nominators are responsible for gathering and providing relevant documentation to the Canada Council.

== Selection procedure ==
The two laureates are chosen by a single, multidisciplinary peer assessment committee co-chaired by the Chairman of the Canada Council for the Arts and the President of the Social Sciences and Humanities Research Council of Canada. Members are chosen to ensure fair representation of gender, the two official languages, the various regions and cultures of Canada, and the various types of artistic and scholarly disciplines. Committee members are among the most accomplished individuals in their respective fields and, ideally, have interests that extend beyond the confines of a single discipline.

== List of recipients ==
Year	Laureate
2024	Shirley Cheechoo
2024	Christina Sharpe
2023	Joséphine Bacon
2023	Françoise Baylis
2022	Cecilia M. Benoit, sociologist
2022	H. Nigel Thomas, author, poet
2021	M. NourbeSe Philip
2021	Gordon J. G. Asmundson
2020	Mary Kerr, production designer
2020	David Lyon
2019	Alexina Louie
2019	John Borrows
2018	Diane Schoemperlen
2018	Lynne Viola
2017	Lawrence Hill
2017	Kent Roach
2016	Marie-Claire Blais
2016	John McGarry
2015	M. G. Vassanji
2015	Constance Backhouse
2014	John Arcand
2014	Jean Grondin
2013	Richard Wagamese
2013	Ann Dale
2012	Dáirine Ní Mheadhra
2012	Keren Rice
2011	Herménégilde Chiasson
2011	Peter Victor
2010	Édouard Lock
2010	Linda Hutcheon
2009	Ian Wallace
2009	Leonard Wayne Sumner
2008	Sheila Fischman
2008	Angus McLaren
2007	Alex Pauk
2007	Paul Thagard
2006	Nicole Brossard
2006	Henry Mintzberg
2005	Iain Baxter
2005	Ramsay Cook
2004	Maria Campbell
2004	Richard Tremblay
2003	Walter Boudreau
2003	Janice Gross Stein
2002	Christopher Newton
2002	Margaret Lock
2001	Not awarded
2000	Jacques Poulin
2000	Ian Hacking
1999	Kiugak Ashoona
1999	Tom Courchene
1998	Jeanne Lamon
1998	Michael Trebilcock
1997	Mary Pratt
1997	Guy Rocher
1996	Mavis Gallant
1996	Pierre Maranda
1995	Gerald Ferguson
1995	Donald Akenson
1994	Michel Tremblay
1994	Martin Friedland
1993	R. Murray Schafer
1993	Juliet McMaster
1992	Douglas Cardinal
1992	Fernand Dumont
1991	Denys Arcand
1991	Charles Taylor
1990	Alice Munro
1990	Jean-Jacques Nattiez
1989	Vera Frenkel
1989	Fernande Saint-Martin
1988	Robertson Davies
1988	Terence Michael Penelhum
1987	Yvette Brind'Amour
1987	Marc-Adélard Tremblay
1986	J. Mavor Moore
1986	William Dray
1985	Gaston Miron
1985	Ronald Melzack
1984	Marcel Dubé
1984	James G. Eayrs
1983	Brian Macdonald
1983	Francess Halpenny
1982	Alan Cairns
1982	Louis-Edmond Hamelin
1982	Jack McClelland
1982	Gilles Vigneault
1981	Margaret Atwood
1981	Marcel Trudel
1981	John Weinzweig
1980	Michel Brault
1980	Lois Marshall
1980	Robert Weaver
1979	Jean Duceppe
1979	Betty Oliphant
1979	Michael Snow
1978	Gabrielle Roy
1978	Jack Shadbolt
1978	George Story
1977	John Hirsch
1977	Bill Reid
1977	Jean-Louis Roux
1976	Orford String Quartet
1976	Denise Pelletier
1976	Jon Vickers
1975	Alex Colville
1975	Pierre Dansereau
1975	Margaret Laurence
1974	W. A. C. H Dobson
1974	Celia Franca
1974	Jean Paul Lemieux
1973	John James Deutsch
1973	Alfred Pellan
1973	George Woodcock
1972	Maureen Forrester
1972	Rina Lasnier
1972	Norman McLaren
1971	Northrop Frye
1971	Duncan Macpherson
1971	Yves Thériault
1970	Jean-Paul Audet
1970	Morley Callaghan
1970	Arnold Spohr
1969	Glenn Gould
1969	Jean Le Moyne
1968	Arthur Erickson
1968	Anne Hébert
1968	Marshall McLuhan
1967	Georges-Henri Lévesque
1967	Hugh MacLennan
1965-66	Jean Gascon
1965-66	Frank Scott
1964	Donald Creighton
1964	Alain Grandbois
