= Matthijs Verschoor =

Dutch pianist

Matthijs Verschoor (born 1955) is a Dutch classical pianist.

He grew up in Enkhuizen and studied at the conservatories of Rotterdam and Amsterdam and continued his studies in Rome and London. Among his teachers are Bart Berman, Willem Brons and John Bingham.

Verschoor gave recitals in many European countries. As a soloist, he performed with multiple orchestras, among others with works by Mozart, Franck, Ravel (both piano concertos) and Gershwin. He recorded many radio programs. Since 2005, he also performs in a chamber music duo with the Dutch cellist Mayke Rademakers.

Verschoor's first album contained works by Bach, Händel and Scarlatti. Albums with works by Chopin, Beethoven, Rachmaninoff, Korngold and Skrjabin followed.

Matthijs Verschoor was a professor of piano and chairperson of the piano department at the Amsterdam Conservatory and a visiting professor at Trinity College of Music in London. Among his students were Harm Hoeve and Nick Ross. He taught master classes throughout Europe.
