= Terence Penelhum =

British-Canadian philosopher and writer (1929–2020)

- Born: 26 April 1929; Bradford-on-Avon, England
- Died: 26 February 2020 (aged 90)
- Citizenship: British-Canadian
- Education: University of Edinburgh (M.A. in philosophy, 1950); Oriel College, Oxford (B.Phil in philosophy, 1952)
- Occupations: Philosopher, writer
- Notable work: Survival and Disembodied Existence (1970); Religion and Rationality (1971)
- Spouse: Edith Andrews (m. 1950; died 2016)
- Children: 2
- Awards: Alberta Achievement Award (1987); Canada Council Molson Prize for the Humanities and Social Sciences (1988)

Terence Michael Penelhum (26 April 1929 – 26 February 2020) was a British-Canadian philosopher and writer, known for his work on the philosophy of religion, personal identity and Hume.

== Biography ==
Penelhum was born in Bradford-on-Avon. His early education was received at Weymouth Grammar School, he then went on to study for an M.A. in Philosophy at the University of Edinburgh in 1950 and a B.Phil in philosophy from Oriel College, Oxford in 1952.

He married Edith Andrews in 1950; they had two children. Penelhum became a Canadian citizen in 1961. He was appointed associate professor at University of Alberta (1953–1956) and Professor of Philosophy at the University of Calgary (1963–1978) where he was Professor of Religious Studies (1978–1988). After retiring from the University of Calgary, in 1988, he received the title Professor Emeritus of Religious Studies.

Penelhum was best known for his books Survival and Disembodied Existence (1970) and Religion and Rationality (1971). In Survival and Disembodied Existence, Penelhum examines the intelligibility of the belief that persons can survive death in two forms, disembodied survival and bodily resurrection.

He received honorary doctorates from the universities of Calgary, Lakehead, Lethbridge and Waterloo. He received the Alberta Achievement Award (1987) and the Canada Council Molson Prize for the Humanities and Social Sciences (1988).

Penelhum's wife died in 2016; he died on 26 February 2020.

== Selected publications ==
- Survival and Disembodied Existence (1970)
- Problems of Religious Knowledge (1971)
- Religion and Rationality (1971)
- God and Skepticism (1983)
- Butler (1985)
- David Hume: an Introduction to his Philosophical System (1992)
- Reason and Religious Faith (1995)
- Christian Ethics and Human Nature (1999)
- Themes in Hume: the Self, the Will, Religion (2000)
