= Jean-Paul Audet =

Canadian philosopher

- Born: December 7, 1918
- Died: November 12, 1993 (aged 74)
- Awards: Order of Canada

Jean-Paul Audet, OC FRSC (French pronunciation: [ʒɑ̃ pɔl odɛ]; December 7, 1918 – November 12, 1993) was a French Canadian academic and philosopher.

He was a professor and former head of the Université de Montréal's Department of Philosophy.

In 1988, he was made an Officer of the Order of Canada for his "contribution to the field of theology". In 1969, he was awarded the Molson Prize. In 1970, he was made a Fellow of the Royal Society of Canada.

== Bibliography ==
- Audet, Jean-Paul (1967). Structures of Christian Priesthood: Home, Marriage, and Celibacy in the Pastoral Service of the Church: the Origin of a Tradition and Its Meaning for Today;. Franklin: Sheed & Ward. ISBN 978-0-7220-0507-1.
- Audet, Jean-Paul (1998). Le Projet Evangelique De Jesus. Les Editions des Sources. ISBN 978-2-922395-00-6. (reprint)
- Audet, Jean-Paul (1999). Jesus and the Gospel Project. Les Editions des Sources. ISBN 978-2-922395-01-3. (reprint)
- Audet, Jean-Paul (2004). Dimensions Religieuses De La Culture Occidentale. City: Editions des sources. ISBN 978-2-922395-04-4. (reprint)
- Audet, Jean-Paul (1999). Mariage Et Celibat Dans Le Service Pastoral De L'eglise, Histoire Et Orientation. Les Editions des Sources. ISBN 978-2-922395-02-0. (reprint)
