= Mayor (musical) =

Original cast recording

Mayor is a musical with a book by Warren Leight and music and lyrics by Charles Strouse. It is based on the memoir by former New York City Mayor Ed Koch and depicts a single day in the life of the city's mayor. The musical ran on Broadway in 1985 after an Off-Broadway run.

== Overview ==
Real-life personalities who are portrayed in the musical include Cardinal John O'Connor, Bess Myerson, Leona and Harry Helmsley, Carol Bellamy, Harrison J. Goldin, John V. Lindsay, Abraham Beame and Sue Simmons.

The play, called an "exuberant, witty cabaret revue" has a "distinctly New York brand of humor and the local political joke", according to an article in The Washington Post. The article went on to note several in-jokes, such as "the hysterical monologue on the city's absurd ritual of alternate-side parking, whereby owners double-park their cars several hours a day because of street-sweeping rules?"

Keith Curran, who was in the original cast, (as Harry Helmsley) directed a production of the musical at the Ruth Foreman Theatre West (Sunrise, Florida) in January 1988, saying: "It tells 'a sort of morality tale for Koch, like A Christmas Carol... Koch is visited by the spirit of Fiorello LaGuardia and threatened with losing the city. There is a lot of redemption in this show, but it takes a very harsh look at New York and how hard it is to live there." Strouse said that he wanted to write a musical that "filtered New York sounds through it." The musical has music "alternating contemporary pop with ragtime, jazz and other styles, each carefully chosen to evoke a mood or characterize a class of people illustrative of New York."

== Production ==
The Off-Broadway production was directed by Jeffrey B. Moss and choreographed by Strouse's wife, Barbara Siman. It opened on May 13, 1985, at the Top of the Gate in Greenwich Village and ran for 185 performances. The cast included Lenny Wolpe as the Mayor and Nancy Giles, Ken Jennings, Ilene Kristen, Douglas Bernstein, Marlon J. Caffey, Keith Curran and Kathryn McAteer in supporting roles.

On October 23, 1985, the production moved to Broadway at the Latin Quarter, where it ran to January 5, 1986, for another 70 performances. John Sloman replaced Keith Curran.

The production received nominations for the 1986 Drama Desk Award: Outstanding Book of a Musical; Outstanding Featured Actress in a Musical (McAteer); and Outstanding Music.

A cast album was released on the Harbinger label.

== Song list ==
Act I

- "Mayor" - Mayor Koch
- "You Can Be a New Yorker Too!" - Businessman, Out of Towner, Bicycle Messenger and Company
- You're Not the Mayor
- Mayor (Reprise)
- March of the Yuppies
- Hootspa
- Coalition
- What You See Is What You Get

Act II

- In the Park
- Ballad
- I Want to Be the Mayor
- Subway: The Last "I Love New York" Song
- Ballad (Reprise)
- Testimonial Dinner: Good Times
- We Are One (I'll Never Leave You)
- How'm I Doin'
- Mayor (Reprise)
- "My City" - Company

== Critical reception ==
Frank Rich, in his review of the Off-Broadway production for The New York Times, called the musical a "modest new cabaret musical adapted from Mr. Koch's memoirs..." and wrote: "In the sharper segments, most of them in Act II, Mr. Strouse and Mr. Leight make some funny (if rarely rude) observations about their hero and his city.... Mr. Strouse's serviceable score has a peppy show-biz lilt to it, but the lyrics to songs like 'March of the Yuppies,' 'How'm I Doin'?' and 'Hootspa' (for "chutzpah") are often as predictable as their titles."
