= Varadi =

Varadi or Váradi is a surname. Notable people with the surname include:

- Adam Varadi (born 1985), Czech footballer
- Benedek Váradi (born 1995), Hungarian basketball player
- Hédi Váradi (1929–1987), Hungarian actress
- Imre Varadi (born 1959), English footballer
- János Váradi (born 1961), Hungarian boxer

== See also ==
- Varady
