= Ann Dale =

Canadian environmental researcher (born 1948)

Ann Dale (born 1948) is a researcher, public advocate and environmental policy analyst. She is known for her research on community sustainability.

== Life and work ==
Originally from Ottawa, Dale is a professor of Environment and Sustainability at Royal Roads University in Victoria, British Columbia. She studied at Carleton University, earning a degree in psychology in 1975 and a degree in public administration in 1994. She previously worked in the Canadian federal government where in 1988 she founded the National Round Table on the Environment and the Economy. In 1999, she completed her doctorate in National Resources Sciences from McGill University. During the 1990s, Dale worked as a senior associate at the University of British Columbia's Sustainable Development Research Institute.

In her current work she has served on a number of national and international organizations related to community development, environmental causes and the impact of climate change. These include serving as a director of the World Fisheries Trust and serving on the National Advisory Committee on Energy Efficiency. She is a fellow of the World Academy of Arts and Sciences and a member of the National Advisory Committee on Energy Efficiency. Dale was also involved in creating the National Environmental Treasure, a people's trust for the environment. The Treasure funds capacity building for Canadian organizations to address issues in environmental education, infrastructure and communications. She has previously served as president of the Canadian Biodiversity Institute.

Dale has led several major research projects related to sustainability. She was the Canada Research Chair in Sustainable Community Development from 2004 to 2014. She is also a lead of the Canadian Consortium for Sustainable Development Research. More recently, she has been engaged as the principal investigator of the M3 Project. This interdisciplinary team is focused on developing local strategies for addressing the impact of climate change in British Columbia, which is funded by the Pacific Institute for Climate Change Studies.

== Awards and nominations ==
Some awards and nominations are:

- CUFA Distinguished Academic Career Achievement Award, 2014
- Molson Prize, Canada Council for the Arts, 2013.
- Bissett Alumni Award for Distinctive Contributions to the Public Sector, 2009
- Trudeau Fellow, Pierre Elliot Trudeau Foundation, 2004-2007
- Policy Research Initiative Award for Outstanding Research Contribution to Public Policy, 2001

== Selected works ==
- Ann Dale. Edging Forward: achieving sustainable community development. Tamagouche, Nova Scotia: Fernweh Press, 2018.
- Ann Dale and John B. Robinson. Achieving Sustainable Development. Vancouver: UBC Press 2014.
- Ann Dale. A dynamic balance: social capital and sustainable community development. Vancouver: UBC Press 2014.
- Ann Dale, Robert Newell, Yuill Herbert, Rebecca Foon. Community Vitality: from adaptation to transformation. Tatamagouche, Nova Scotia: Fernweh Press, 2014.
- Ann Dale. At the edge: sustainable development in the 21st century. Vancouver: UBC Press, 2007.
- Ann Dale, John T. Pierce, Sustainable Development Research Institute. Communities, Development, and Sustainability Across Canada. University of British Columbia Press, 1999.
- Ann Dale, John B. Robinson. Achieving sustainability in Canada. Vancouver: UBC Press, 1996.
