= Keith Curran =

American playwright and actor (1956–2024)

Keith Curran (February 29, 1956 – September 18, 2024) was an American playwright and actor.

== Life and career ==
Curran grew up in Boston. He had nightmares as a child and used that experience, as well as his desire to have a child, as a basis for his 1989 stage play Dalton's Back. The play juxtaposes scenes about a boy's relationship with his mother with scenes of the boy as an adult who thinks he wants to have a child. The New York Times said that while Curran's approach is earnest, it is not "particularly revelatory or theatrical to draw straight lines between related events from childhood and adulthood". Critic John Simon called the play boring. Dalton's Back ran from February 9 to March 5, 1989, at the Circle Rep.

Curran's next play, Walking the Dead, follows a lesbian who has a sex change to become a man and is murdered by homophobes. Simon commented that the purpose of the play, also performed by the Circle Rep, was to "irritate the hell" out of the audience, and that it spewed bile equally at heterosexuals and bisexuals. Two selections from Walking the Dead were included in The Best Men's Stage Monologues of 1991.

His play The Stand In was included in The Actor's Book of Gay and Lesbian Plays. Variety said the play "epitomizes the best in small theater: A sharp, funny script ... [which] skewers nearly anything that moves, including filmmakers, publicists, talkshows, award shows, religions, gay activists, journalists and musician Yanni".

Curran's on-stage work included the musicals Just So (as the Giraffe) and Mayor. While Simon panned the production of Just So, calling it insipid, he singled out Curran and Teresa Burrell stating that their performances were "flavorous" and overcame the poor material.

Curren was gay. He died on September 18, 2024, at the age of 68.
