= Warren Leight =

American playwright, screenwriter, film director

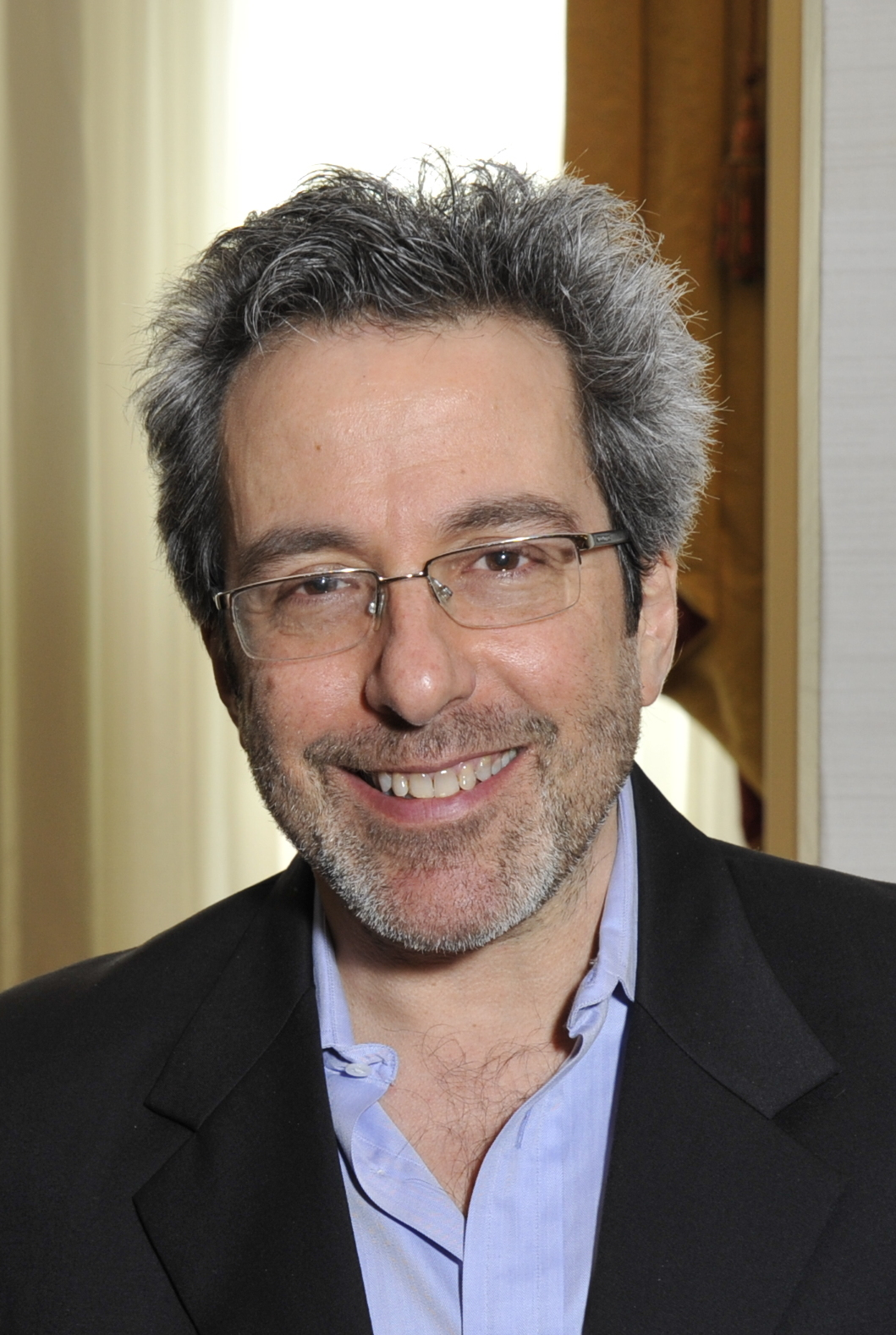
- Leight at the 69th Annual Peabody Awards
- Born: January 17, 1957 (age 69); New York City, New York, U.S.
- Other name: Warren D. Leight
- Education: Stanford University (BS)
- Occupations: Television writer, play writer, director, executive producer
- Years active: 1980–present
- Spouse: Karen Hauser
- Children: 2

Warren Donald Leight (/laɪt/; born January 17, 1957) is an American playwright, screenwriter, film director and television producer. He is best known for his work on Law & Order: Criminal Intent and Lights Out and as the showrunner for In Treatment and Law & Order: Special Victims Unit. His play Side Man was a finalist for the 1999 Pulitzer Prize for Drama.

== Biography ==
=== Personal life ===
Warren Leight was born to jazz trumpeter Don Leight (1923–2004), and his wife, Timmy, the second of two children. Both Warren and his older sister, Jody (b. 1955), grew up with financial trouble and around clubs.

In the 1950s, his father played with jazz musicians such as Claude Thornhill, Woody Herman and Buddy Rich. Leight's uncle, Larry, and paternal great-grandfather, Harry Gurovitch, were also trumpet players of Russian descent. His grandmother, Sarah Gurowitsch, was a cellist. He was raised in the Sunnyside section of the borough of Queens and the Upper West Side of Manhattan.

Leight received a B.S. degree in communication from Stanford University in 1977, planning a career as a journalist. Leight began his writing career with the 1980 horror film Mother's Day, followed by the documentary Before the Nickelodeon: The Cinema of Edwin S. Porter (1982) (as the voice of "Terrible Teddy"), the indie Stuck on You! (1983), and the Miramax film The Night We Never Met (1993), which he also directed, starring Matthew Broderick, and which earned him a nomination at the Deauville Film Festival. He wrote the screenplay for the 1996 Greg Kinnear comedy Dear God.

In the 1980s, he was the creative director/writer for a quartet of "witty" female comics known as the "High Heeled Women," which included actress Arleen Sorkin, who performed in cabarets in New York City.

He is married to Karen Hauser, who created the Internet Broadway Database (IBDB.com) and serves as Research Director for the Broadway League. They live in New York City with their two daughters.

=== Stage ===
For his first stage project, Leight teamed with composer-lyricist Charles Strouse on the musical Mayor, inspired by Ed Koch and his dealings with Leona Helmsley and Bess Myerson. It ran for 185 performances at the Top of the Gate in Greenwich Village starting on May 13, 1985. The musical transferred uptown to the Latin Quarter on October 23, 1985, running to January 5, 1986, for another 70 performances. He received a 1986 Drama Desk Award nomination for Outstanding Book.

Stray Cats is a "collection of musically influenced monologues" about men, called "cats". Stray Cats was presented by All Season Theatre Group (New York City) on May 14, 1998, directed by Kevin Confoy. The first production was at Naked Angels (New York City) with the collaboration of Jo Bonney and others.

Leight's 1998 play Side Man won him the 1999 Tony Award for Best Play and nominations for both the 1998 Drama Desk Award for Outstanding Play and the Pulitzer Prize for Drama. It starred Edie Falco and Frank Wood.

In 2001, his play Glimmer, Glimmer & Shine was produced by the Mark Taper Forum in Los Angeles. It was produced Off-Broadway by the Manhattan Theatre Club from May 24, 2001, to July 8, 2001. John Spencer appeared in both productions, directed by Evan Yionoulis.

He contributed works to The 24 Hour Plays, a unique theatrical event in which several short plays are written, rehearsed, directed, and performed within 24 hours, in 2003, 2004, 2005, 2007 and 2009 (Daily Bread starring Billy Crudup, Rosie Perez and Rachel Dratch).

No Foreigners Beyond This Point had its world premiere at Center Stage in Baltimore, Maryland in November 2002, directed by Tim Vasen. The play opened Off-Broadway, produced by the Ma-Yi Theater Company at The Culture Project 45 Bleecker Theatre, on September 17, 1995, in previews. Directed by Loy Arcenas, the cast included Laura Kai Chen, Ron Domingo, Wai Ching Ho, Francis Jue, Karen Tsen Lee, Abby Royle, Ean Sheehy and Henry Yuk. The play was inspired by Leight's experiences teaching English in Guangdong (Canton), China. He received a nomination for the 2006 Drama Desk Award, Play, for the Off-Broadway production.

His play James and Annie premiered at the Ensemble Theatre of Cincinnati in March 2003. The play involves an "interracial love affair".

=== Television ===
Leight ventured into television as a freelance writer for 100 Centre Street in 2002. On a suggestion from playwright Theresa Rebeck, Law & Order: Criminal Intent executive producer René Balcer hired Leight to join the staff of the series in its second season as a writer/producer. His colleagues included a reference to Leight's play Side Man; in a third-season episode, "Shrink-Wrapped"; a bickering couple argues about the motivations of the married couple in the play. Upon a recommendation from Balcer, Leight was named the show's executive producer and head writer in 2006 when Balcer left the show at the end of the fifth season.

In 2008, he left Criminal Intent after its seventh season to be the showrunner for HBO's series In Treatment, a year after CI moved to cable. In July 2009, it was announced that Leight had joined FX's new drama Lights Out.

On April 11, 2011, Variety reported that Leight would serve as showrunner for Law & Order: Special Victims Unit starting with the thirteenth season. Prior to Leight joining SVU, he wrote one of the final episodes of Law & Order: Criminal Intent, the 10th-season episode "Trophy Wine", which was the only episode of the season not to be inspired by a real life, true event. Before production on the 13th season of Law & Order: SVU, NBC President Bob Greenblatt sought Leight to "reset the tone" of the show from its prior seasons, while having the storylines "still be compelling but a little more grounded".

Greenblatt and Leight, along with other SVU cast and crew members, began calling the "revamped" series, "SVU 2.0". Mariska Hargitay took over the series as lead, due to Christopher Meloni's abrupt departure. In an interview with TV Guide Leight noted "I'm aware of how successful and well-liked this show is. I'm just trying to figure out how you rejuvenate it after 12 years." Leight joined SVU over choosing to launch a new show. Regarding Meloni's character's departure, he noted "the character most affected by his departure is Olivia. I think in the old days of Law & Order, you'd rip a limb off, attach a new limb, and go back and pitch. Rub some dirt in the wound and go out there. We're trying to do that a little. To my mind and to Mariska's mind, [Stabler's exit] will be playing out over several episodes — sometimes in subtle ways, sometimes in overt ways."

When Leight was asked how he felt running what was then the last remaining Law & Order series, he responded, "It's a storied franchise, and I don't want to go down with the last ship. I'd rather this be the turning point or a regeneration of the franchise. It was made clear to me that — and this was before Chris had left — if the show kept going the way it was going, at most it had two years left. Probably just one. If you keep doing everything you've been doing, you'll be gone. That's an interesting message to get when you take a new job. I have to hope that ... the changes being made this year lead to another five years for this show. And clearly, this summer made the case for why this show needs to be on the air. It felt like every week there was a story about powerful men behaving badly or strange goings on. In New York, the number of murders is down 75 percent from its peak, but that's not the case with this kind of crime at all. We have a wall in the writers' room that has 50 New York Post headlines on it from the summer. It's not like the show's original conceit doesn't make sense anymore."

Leight noted that his biggest goal for season 13 is "First of all, survive. Survive the transition and make a compelling case for why people should continue to watch the show and come back to the show. That's on a business level. On a thematic level, we want to explore the gray of all of this. And to explore the psyches of victims and perps a little bit more and the effect this work takes on the people who do it. When a cop tells me about a real-life interrogation he did, I'm on the edge of my chair. That's where we want to be."

Prior to SVU being renewed for a 14th season, Leight said to TV Guide, "I don't want it to be a victory lap, I want it to be 14 years down, seven to go, as opposed to 14 years down and it's been a good run." Ratings "roller-coastered" in season 13, from its lead-in at the time, Rock Center with Brian Williams with competition from CSI: Crime Scene Investigation on CBS and Revenge on ABC. "I get so tired of people saying that the show is down from Meloni," Leight says. "From the point of view of scripted hour-longs, we're performing very strongly for NBC. Would we perform differently for a different network? Probably. Or with a different lead-in? Probably."

In October 2012, Leight said of the future of the Law & Order franchise – which currently consisted of just Law & Order: SVU – "(Dick Wolf and I) sometimes talk in general terms of where (the franchise) could go. I'm curious to see if there's another iteration somewhere down the line," he says. "We try hard to maintain a certain level of quality which I think is why the shows sustained in reruns so well. And I'd like to believe there's room for another generation in some way." In 2015, he signed an overall deal with Sony Pictures TV.

In May 2016, Leight left as SVU showrunner to develop new television ideas for Sony. In April 2019, Leight announced he was returning to SVU as executive producer/showrunner. His second term would run from seasons 21 to 23, stepping down to take a break, having run the show during the COVID-19 pandemic.

== Filmography ==
- Mother's Day (1980)
- Stuck on You! (1982)
- Before the Nickelodeon: The Cinema of Edwin S. Porter (1982) (Documentary)
- Hot Flashes (1984) (TV)
- Me and Him (1988)
- The Night We Never Met (1993) (also Director)
- Dear God (1996)
- 100 Centre Street (2002) (TV)
- Law & Order: Criminal Intent (2002–2008) (TV) (Producer, Co-Executive Producer, & Executive Producer/Showrunner)
- Hey Joel (2003) (TV)
- In Treatment (2009) (TV)
- Lights Out (2011) (TV) (also Executive Producer)
- Law & Order: Special Victims Unit (2011–2016, 2019–2022) (Executive Producer/Showrunner)

== Selected stage ==
- Mayor (1985)
- Side Man (1998)
- Glimmer, Glimmer, & Shine (2001)
- No Foreigners Beyond This Point (2006)
- Leap of Faith (2012)
- Just in Time (2025)
