= Teodelinda Terán Hicks =

Ecuadorian cellist

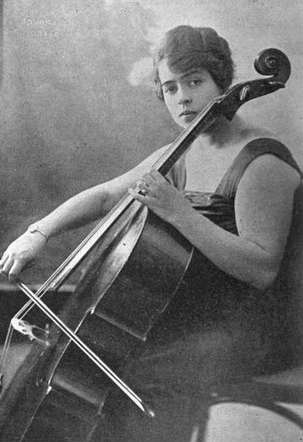
- Teodelinda Terán, from a 1920 publication
- Born: Teodelinda Terán Vaca; March 1, 1889; Quito, Ecuador
- Died: June 11, 1959 (aged 70); San Mateo, California
- Other names: Teolinda Terán, Teolina Terán, Tolita T. Hicks
- Occupations: Cellist, clubwoman

Teodelinda Terán Hicks (March 1, 1889 – June 11, 1959) was an Ecuadorian cellist.

== Early life ==
Teodelinda Terán was born in Quito, Ecuador, the daughter of General Emilio María Terán and Hortensia Vaca. She attended the National Conservatory of Music in Quito, as did two of her brothers Augusto, a flutist, and Enrique, a violinist and later a novelist. When her father became Minister Plenipotentiary of Ecuador in Great Britain, she and her brothers continued their musical studies in London. She also played and taught piano. Her father was assassinated in 1911.

== Career ==
Terán, her brothers, a Spanish violinist and two English musicians began performing as the London Sextett in Quito in 1909. In 1919 she moved to San Francisco, California, where she played cello for artists and diplomats at the Presidio. She was a member of the San Francisco Musical Club, and taught cello and piano in the 1920s. After she married, she was founder and hostess of "El Club de los Bandoleros", a Spanish language society in San Francisco. She was also a member of the Belmont Women's Club and the Pan-American League.

== Personal life ==
Teodelinda Terán married composer and businessman Hobert Hicks. She lived in the San Francisco Bay area into the 1950s. She died in 1959, aged 70 years, in San Mateo, California. Her gravesite is in the Golden Gate National Cemetery.
