= Meehae Ryo =

Korean cellist (born 1967)

- Born: September 1, 1967 (age 59)
- Origin: Seoul, South Korea
- Instrument: Violoncello
- Years active: 1997-present
- Website: celloryo.com schwingungen.at

Meehae Ryo (born 1967) is a South Korean cellist who became the first cellist from Korea to release an album under the Deutsche Grammophon label. She has been active in promoting Korean classical music internationally.

Ryo began her studies at The Juilliard School at the age of sixteen and later earned her Doctorate in Music from the University of Michigan.

Ryo has performed in duo and trio with Martha Argerich and was invited to perform at the Tonhalle Zürich in Switzerland. Among her frequent collaborators are Shlomo Mintz and Andrey Baranov, with whom she often performs the Brahms Double Concerto and Beethoven Triple Concerto.

Ryo has appeared as a soloist with orchestras around the world, including the Nürnberger Symphoniker, Roma Symphony Orchestra, Sofia Philharmonic, Athens State Orchestra, Zagreb Philharmonic Orchestra, Prague Radio Symphony Orchestra, Slovak Radio Symphony Orchestra, Israel Symphony Orchestra, Berliner Symphoniker, Seoul Philharmonic Orchestra, Bucheon Philharmonic Orchestra, and Daejeon Philharmonic Orchestra.

She has performed in major concert halls such as the Musikverein Golden Hall, Smetana Hall, Dvořák Hall, Liszt Hall Budapest, Mozarteum Salzburg Great Hall, Concertgebouw Amsterdam, Tonhalle Zürich, Berliner Philharmonie Grosser Saal, Elbphilharmonie Hamburg, Carnegie Hall, and the Auditorium della Conciliazione in Rome.

Ryo is a Regular Visiting Professor of Cello at the Korea National University of Arts and has served as a juror for international cello competitions including the Enescu International Competition, Khachaturian International Competition, Antonio Janigro International Competition, Belgrade International Jeunesses Competition, the Beethoven International Competition in Hradec (Czech Republic), Dubai Classic Strings Competition, and the Brahms International Competition in Austria. In January 2026, cellist Meehae Ryo will host the Heinrich Schiff Cello Competition for the first time in Vienna, in collaboration with the University of Music and Performing Arts Vienna (MDW).

Since 2012, Ryo has served as Artistic Director of IMK Vienna, contributing to international music education and cultural exchange.
