= Mimi Hwang =

American cellist

- Born: Los Angeles, California
- Other names: Margery Hwang
- Occupation: cellist

Mimi Hwang is an American cellist and a winner of both the Banff and the Evian International String Quartet Competitions.

== Early life ==
Hwang was born in Los Angeles, California. Hwang's parents are immigrants of Chinese ancestry. At age 8, Hwang began playing the cello.

== Education ==
Hwang earned a bachelor's degree with distinction from New England Conservatory of Music. Hwang earned a master's degree from San Francisco Conservatory of Music.

== Career ==
Hwang is the founding member of the Franciscan String Quartet with musicians Wendy Sharp, Alison Harney, and Marcia Cassidy. In 1987, the Franciscan String Quartet performed their first formal New York concert at Weill Hall of Carnegie Hall.

Hwang has performed with such quartets as the Ciompi Quartet, the Tokyo Quartet, the Ying Quartet and the Colorado Quartet and was a participant in both the Beijing Philharmonic and the Los Angeles Philharmonic. She also played in the San Francisco Chamber Orchestra and with such musicians as Raphael Hillyer, Laurence Lesser and Michael Tree. Later on, she became a founder of Cello Divas and Quartos with which she appeared in such places as Banff, Norfolk, Roycroft, and Skaneateles as well as at the Aspen Music Festival. Currently she is co-artistic director of the Yellow Barn Music School and Festival and is both a Trustee of the Arts and a member of the Cultural Council for Greater Rochester (NY). Hwang plays in the Amenda Quartet.

== Personal life ==
Hwang has two daughters, Emma and Celia. Hwang resides in Brighton, New York.
