= Inner Mongolia Suite =

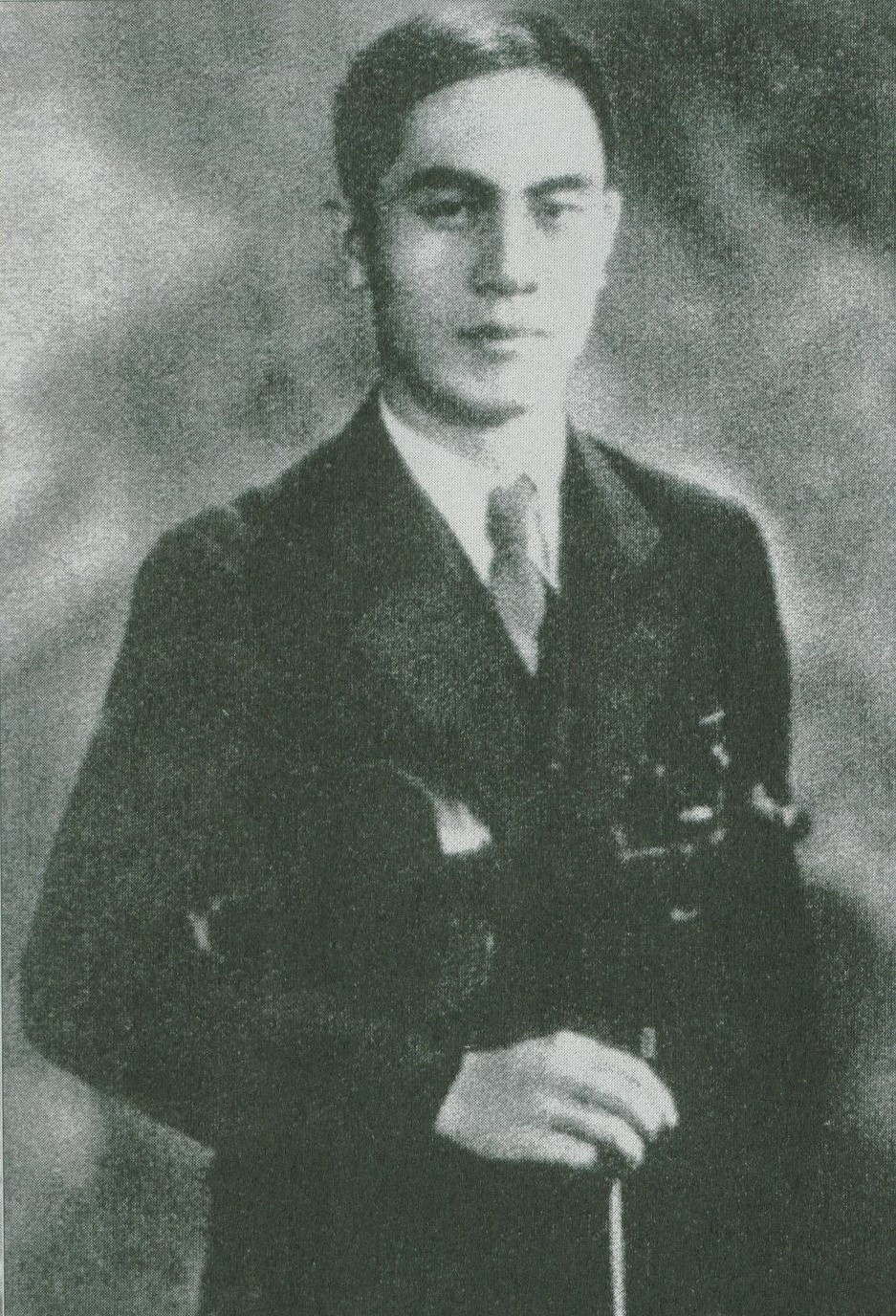
Ma Sicong in 1932

Inner Mongolia Suite (Chinese: 内蒙组曲; pinyin: Nèiměng Zǔqǔ), Op. 9, is a suite for violin and piano by Ma Sicong (1912–87). The Suite was composed in 1937 after Ma's return from a trip to Suiyuan province, and published under the title Suiyuan Suite (Chinese: 绥远组曲; pinyin: Suíyuǎn Zǔqǔ); it was renamed after Suiyuan was incorporated into Inner Mongolia in 1954. Its three movements, based on traditional music of the Suiyuan region, are:

1. Epic
2. Nostalgia
3. Dances Beyond the Frontier.

The second movement, Nostalgia is Ma's most famous work. It is still frequently played in concerts.
