= Christopher Heath Wellman =

American philosopher (born 1967)

Christopher “Kit” Heath Wellman (born February 22, 1967) is an American philosopher. He teaches at Washington University in St. Louis, where he is also dean of academic planning for Arts & Sciences. He is best known for his distinctive views on core questions in political theory, including political legitimacy, secession, the duty to obey the law, immigration, and the permissibility of punishment.

== Topics ==
=== Political legitimacy ===
In his 1996 article, “Liberalism, Samaritanism, and Political Legitimacy,” Wellman introduced his “samaritan” account of political legitimacy. According to Wellman, political states can be legitimate when:

- they are necessary to secure vitally important benefits that would not be available in their absence
- they supply these benefits without imposing unreasonable costs upon those they coerce.

On this view, just as Alice may permissibly commandeer Carolyn's car (without Carolyn's permission) if this is the only way Alice can get Beth to the hospital in time to save Beth's life, a state may permissibly coerce its constituents (without their consent) if this is the only way to rescue everyone in the state's territorial jurisdiction from the perils of the state of nature. Wellman's view thus combines a common descriptive claim (that political states are necessary to save us all from the perils of the state of nature) with the distinctive moral premise of samaritanism (the idea that we have a duty to rescue those who are sufficiently imperiled when we can do so at no unreasonable cost to ourselves).

=== Secession ===
In his 2005 book, A Theory of Secession: The Case for Political Self-Determination, Wellman argues that separatist groups can have a right to secede even if they seek to break off from legitimate states who have never treated the separatists unjustly. On his view, any group has a moral right to secede as long as its political divorce will leave it and the remainder state in position to perform requisite functions. Wellman shows that legitimate states can be valued while permitting their division.

Once political states are recognized as valuable because of their functions, the territorial boundaries of existing states might permissibly be redrawn as long as neither the process not the result of this reconfiguration interrupts the delivery of the crucial functions. This analysis does not constrain the motivations for secession, e.g., the right to self-determination.

=== Duty to obey the Law ===
Wellman later advanced a samaritan account of the "duty to obey the law". He does not assert that each resident must obey the law simply to allow the state to perform its necessary functions, because empirically states continue to function in the absence of uniform compliance. (Smith's nonpayment of taxes, for instance, has no discernible effect upon the state's capacity.) In light of this, in his 2001 article, “Toward a Liberal Theory of Political Obligation,” Wellman suggests that the nonconsequential premise of fairness must be invoked to explain an individual's duty to obey the law. On his view, each person is obligated to obey the just laws of a legitimate state because to allow some to violate the law while sufficiently many do not is unfair.

=== Immigration ===
Wellman defends a legitimate state's right to design and enforce its own immigration policy in his 2008 article, “Immigration and Freedom of Association.” Wellman's argument involves three core premises:

- legitimate states are entitled to political self-determination
- freedom of association is an integral component of self-determination
- freedom of association includes the right to refuse to associate with others

Wellman reasons that just as an individual has the right to determine whom (if anyone) to marry, a group of fellow citizens have the right to determine whom (if anyone) it would like to invite into its political community. And just as an individual's freedom of association entitles her to remain single, a legitimate state's freedom of association entitles it to exclude all outsiders.

=== Punishment ===
Given that persons typically have a right not to be punished, it would seem natural to conclude that the permissibility of punishment is centrally a question of rights. Despite this, the vast majority of theorists working on punishment have focused instead on important aims, such as achieving retributive justice, deterring crime, restoring victims, or expressing society's core values.

In his 2017 book, Rights Forfeiture and Punishment, Wellman argues that these aims may well explain why we should want a properly constructed system of punishment, but none shows why it would be permissible to institute one. According to Wellman, only a rights-based analysis will suffice, because the justification for punishment must demonstrate that punishment is permissible, and it would be permissible only if it violated no one's rights. On Wellman's view, punishment is permissible in cases where the wrongdoer has forfeited her right against punishment by culpably violating (or at least attempting to violate) the rights of others.

== Selected publications ==
- C. H. Wellman, A Theory of Secession (Cambridge University Press, 2005)
- C.H. Wellman and A.J. Simmons, Is There a Duty to Obey the Law? (Cambridge University Press, 2005)
- A. Altman and C.H. Wellman, A Liberal Theory of International Justice (Oxford University Press, 2009)
- C.H. Wellman and P. Cole, Debating the Ethics of Immigration (Oxford University Press, 2011)
- C.H. Wellman, Liberal Rights and Responsibilities (Oxford University Press, 2013)
- C.H. Wellman, Rights Forfeiture and Punishment (Oxford University Press, 2017)
