= Eleonore Schoenfeld =

- Eleonore Schoenfeld

Background information
- Born: March 6, 1925; Maribor, Slovenia
- Died: January 1, 2007 (aged 81) La Cañada Flintridge, California, U.S.
- Genres: Classical
- Occupations: Cellist, Pedagogue
- Instrument: Violoncello
- Years active: 1952–2006
- Label: BBC

Eleonore Schoenfeld (March 6, 1925 – January 1, 2007) was an American musician, considered one of the most influential cellists of the 20th century.

== Biography ==
Born in Maribor, Slovenia, to a Polish father and a Russian mother, Schoenfeld moved to Berlin with her family at age six. She studied ballet, violin, and piano before switching to cello at age eleven. Her first teacher was Karl Niedermeyer, a pupil of Hugo Becker, with whom she studied until age 14. She then entered the Hochschule für Musik in Berlin (the usual age of entry was 18). She spent the next four years studying with Adolf Steiner, a well-known soloist.

In 1952, Schoenfeld's parents, wary of the Russian dictatorship, led the family to flee to the United States. From there, a connection from the Idyllwild Arts Academy led the then-dean of the USC Thornton School of Music to ask Eleonore and her sister Alice, a concert violinist, to join the faculty. The "Schoenfeld Duo" remained there, serving alongside Gregor Piatigorsky and Jascha Heifetz, among others.

Schoenfeld made over 200 recordings with the BBC.

Her students have become top prizewinners in competitions such as Geneva, the Casals Competition (Budapest), Tchaikovsky (Russia), Markneukirchen (Germany), Antonio Janigro (Croatia), and the Concert Artists Guild (U.S.). Her students have also performed as soloists with the New York Philharmonic, Los Angeles Philharmonic, Los Angeles Chamber Orchestra, Georgian Chamber Orchestra (Georgia), Slovenian Philharmonic, and Bamberg Symphony Orchestra (Germany) with conductors Zubin Mehta, Horst Stein, Esa-Pekka Salonen, Gerard Schwarz, and Carl St.Clair.

In 2008, PBS made the hour-long documentary Born to Teach about Schoenfeld's life.

Schoenfeld died on January 1, 2007, at the home she shared with her sister. She is interred at the Mountain View Cemetery Mortuary in Altadena, California.

== Awards ==
- USC Dean's Award for Excellence in Teaching, 2004
- USC Ramo Music Faculty Award
- Indiana University Grand Dame du Violoncelle Eva Janzer Memorial Award
- American String Teachers Association National Distinguished Service Award
- Music Teachers National Association Lifetime Achievement Award
