= Dáirine Ní Mheadhra =

- Born: Ireland
- Genres: Opera, contemporary
- Occupations: Cellist, conductor, music director, theatre director
- Instrument: Violoncello

Dáirine Ní Mheadhra is a cellist, conductor, and founder of the Queen of Puddings Music Theatre.

== Life and works ==
Born in Cork (city), Ireland, Dáirine Ní Mheadhra began music lessons at the age of four. She began performing with the Irish National Symphony Orchestra as a cellist at the age of 17. She studied at Marseille Conservatoire after developing an interest in conducting. She founded a contemporary music ensemble, Nua Nós, in 1990 along with Rosie Elliott and Michael Taylor. She also studied at Pierre Monteux School before immigrating to Canada in 1993, where she married pianist John Hess.

The couple co-founded the Queen of Puddings Music Theatre in 1995 with the goal of commissioning, developing and producing original Canadian opera. The company produced a number of groundbreaking operas. This included the 1999 work Beatrice Chancy (1999), the first opera about Canadian slavery (with a libretto by George Elliott Clarke, music by James Rolfe, and launching the career of singer Measha Brueggergosman), as well as The Midnight Court (2005), based on the famous Gaelic poem of the same name (and featuring music by Ana Sokolovic). When interviewed about the challenges of producing original work, Ní Mheadhra remarked: "We would never put on anything without thinking of its future life." She was nominated for a Dora Award in 2009 for Outstanding Musical Direction, and she and Hess were co-nominated in 2012 for the Ana Sokolovic work Svadba-Wedding.

The company closed in 2013, with Ní Mheadhra and Hess issuing a statement:

The end of our season in August 2013 feels like a very natural artistic ebbing point, and thus feels like the right moment to close the company. We want to conclude in a year like this, which is full of artistic pleasure, highlights, and fulfillment of our goals, with continued financial stability due to a deficit-free track record.

Ní Mheadhra continued to work as a musical director in partnership with other Toronto-based theatre companies, including All But Gone: a Beckett Rhapsody in 2016.

Dáirine Ní Mheadhra was Artistic Director of Tionscadal na nAmhrán Ealaíne Gaeilge/Irish Language Art Song Project, a collection of 50 new Irish language art songs, commissioned from Irish and International composers.

== Awards ==
- Molson Prize, Canada Council for the Arts, 2012
