= Diachylon =

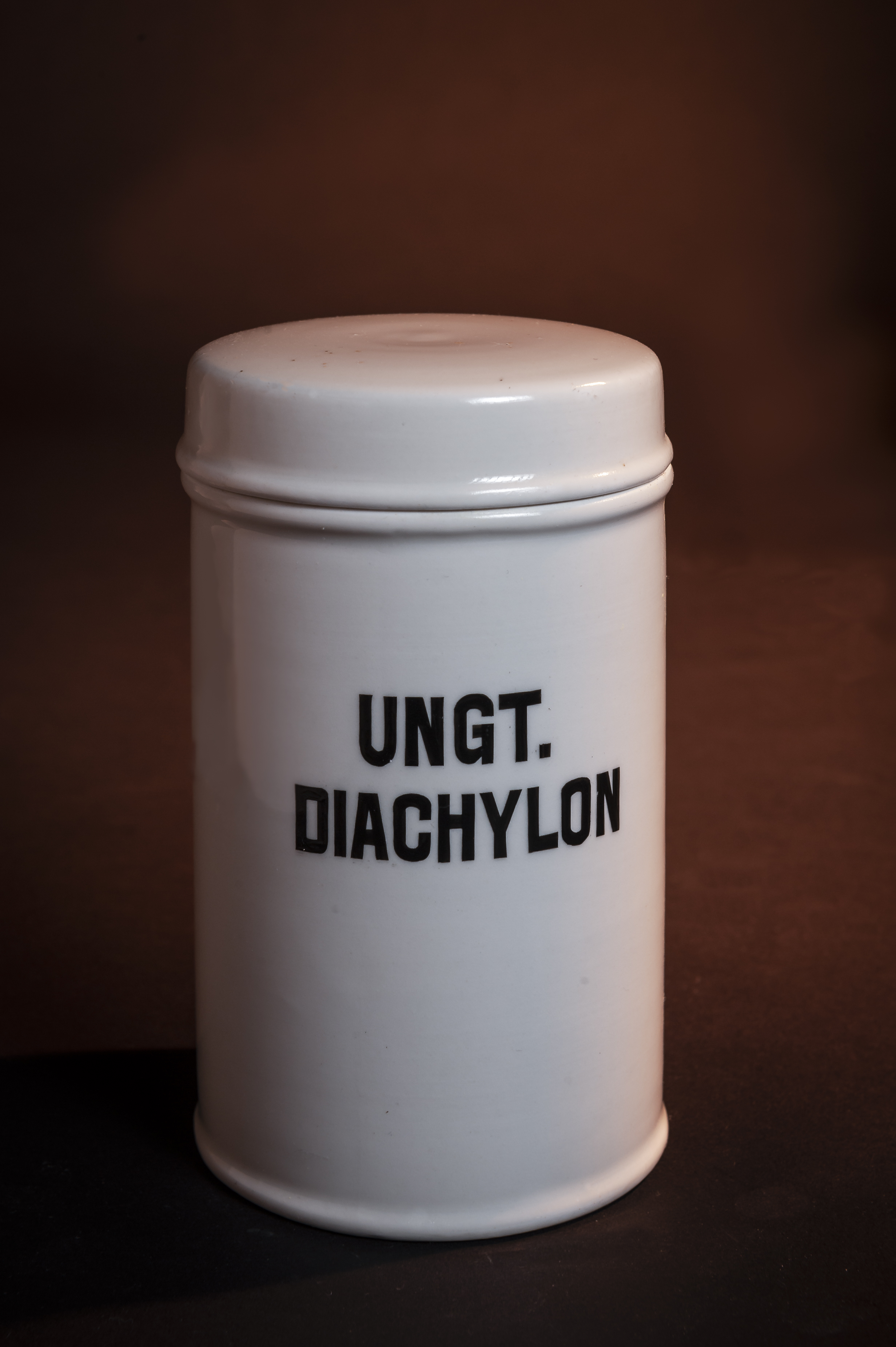
Vintage pharmacy jar for diachylon ointment

Diachylon (from Latin diachȳlōn, representing Greek διὰ χυλῶν, "[a medicament] composed of juices"), also rendered diachylum or diaculum, was originally a kind of medicament made of the juices of several plants (thus its name), but now commonly the name for lead-plaster, emplastrum plumbi—a plaster made of lead oxide boiled together with olive oil and water. It is applied to sheets of linen, and works as an adhesive plaster when heated.

Historically, several different types of diachylons have been described. White, or simple, diachylon is compounded of common oil, litharge of gold (litharge mixed with red lead), and adhesives drawn from the root of the Althaea, the seeds of flax and fenugreek. The diachylon called direatum has for its basis the common white diachylon, but with every pound of which is mixed an ounce of powder of Iris; this plaster digests, incides, and ripens with more force than the simple diachylon.

There is also the great diachylon, or diachylon magnum, composed of litharge of gold, oils of iris, chamomile, and aneth, turpentine, pine resin, yellow wax, and adhesives derived from flax, fenugreek, with new figs, raisins of Damascus, ichthyocolla, juices of iris, squill, and hyssop. This diachylon was said to soften hard swellings called scirrhus, and dissipate tumors.

The diachylon gummatum is the great diachylon with the addition of gum ammoniac, galbanum, and sagapenum, dissolved with wine, and boiled to a consistency of honey. This plaster was believed the most power of all for digesting, ripening, and resolving.

== Use as abortifacient ==
In the late 1800s, working-class women discovered that lead poisoning caused by ingesting diachylon could cause abortion, or, as they described it, "bring on their period." "Diachylon was readily at hand in every working-class home for use on cuts and sores, as a plaster and for drawing milk away after parturition. Now it was put to a new use. In the words of one doctor, 'I have reason to suspect that in this district the practice of taking diachylon in the form of pills to bring on miscarriage is far more prevalent among the working-class than is generally supposed.'".

== Sources ==
- McLaren, Angus (1978). Birth Control in Nineteenth-century England. Holmes & Meier. ISBN 978-0-8419-0349-4.
