= Lynn Hellerstein =

American optometrist, speaker and author

Lynn Hellerstein O.D., FCOVD, FAAO
- Education: Doctor of Optometry
- Alma mater: Pacific University
- Occupations: Optometrist, author, speaker
- Website: LynnHellerstein.com

Lynn F. Hellerstein is an American optometrist, speaker and author best known for her work in the field of vision therapy.

== Career ==
Hellerstein, is known as a pioneer in vision therapy and has created "brain-based" visual strategies to help children and adults increase school and work success, improve sports performance and confidence.

During the 1990s, she was appointed to help write guidelines for the Colorado School Vision Screening Interdisciplinary Task Force and Traumatic Brain Injury Task Force Division of Workers’ Compensation.

Hellerstein is an author and international speaker and has published extensively on vision related topics, including a five-year research study of visual electro-diagnostic techniques in patients with traumatic brain injuries. Her award-winning book, See It. Say It. Do It! The Parent's & Teacher's Action Guide to Creating Successful Students & Confident Kids (2012) is a resource for parents, educators and therapists. See It. Say It. Do It! Organize It! (2011) is a complementary workbook to help children and adults learn how to create action plans to help with their organizational skills. Her book, See It. Say It. Do It! 50 Tips to Improve Your Sports Performance (2013) provides tips to athletes of all ages.

She was listed among the National Academies of Practice by the Distinguished Interprofessional Advisors to Health Care Policy Makers.

A fellow and past president of the College of Optometrists in Vision Development (COVD), Hellerstein is an adjunct faculty member at five schools of optometry. Hellerstein and Brenner Vision Center, P.C., her private optometric practice, is located in the Metro-Denver area and has been listed among the Top 5 vision providers by Colorado Parent magazine. Hellerstein serves as a consultant to educational and parenting groups, rehabilitation facilities and sports teams.

== Awards ==
- 2007 Distinguished Optometrist of the Year for Colorado
- 2010 NABE Pinnacle Book Achievement Award Winner; Best Book in the Category of Parenting
- 2010 CIPA EVVY Award; 1st in "Parenting/Family" category, 2nd in "How To" category, Tech Award for Editing
- 2013 USA Best Book Awards; 50 Tips To Improve Your Sports Performance, "Winner" in the "Health: Exercise & Fitness” Category
- 2011 International Book Award; “Winner" in the "Parenting/Family: General” category

== Works ==
- Hellerstein, L.F. (with Fishman, B.). "Vision Therapy and Occupational Therapy – an Integrated Approach". Journal of Behavioral Optometry. 1990: Vol. 1, Issue 5.
- Hellerstein, L.F. (with Freed, S.). "Rehabilitative Optometric Management of a Traumatic Brain Injury Patient". Journal of Behavioral Optometry. 1994: Vol. 5, Issue 6.
- Hellerstein, Lynn (2012) [2010]. See It. Say It. Do It! The Parent's & Teacher's Action Guide to Creating Successful Students & Confident Kids. HiClear Publishing, LLC. p. 264. ISBN 978-0-9841-7790-5.
- Hellerstein, Lynn (with others) (2011) [2010]. See It. Say It. Do It! ORGANIZE IT! Workbook. HiClear Publishing, LLC. p. 80. ISBN 978-0984177936.
- Hellerstein, Lynn (2013). 50 Tips to Improve Your Sports Performance. HiClear Publishing, LLC. p. 80. ISBN 978-0-9841-7794-3.
