= Sarah Gurowitsch =

Russian Empire-born American cellist and composer (1889–1981)

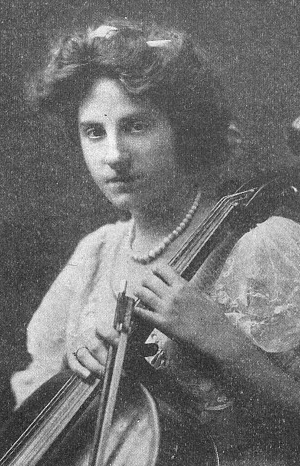
- Sarah Gurowitsch, from a 1914 publication
- Born: February 17, 1889; Russia
- Died: April 24, 1981 (aged 92); New York
- Other names: Sara Gurowitsch, Sara Gurovitch, Sara Gurowitch, Sara Leight, S. Gurowitsch
- Occupations: Cellist and composer

Sara Gurowitsch (February 17, 1889 – April 24, 1981) was a Russian-born American cellist and composer.

== Early life ==
Sarah Gurowitsch was born in the Russian Empire, the daughter of Harry and Esther Goldenberg Gurowitsch, and raised in New York. Her brother Frank and her sister Esther were also musicians. She studied in New York at the National Conservatory of Music and with cellists Hans Kronold and Leo Schulz, then went to Germany for further musical studies with Robert Hausmann. In 1906, she won the Felix Mendelssohn Bartholdi Prize in Berlin.

== Career ==
While in Europe, Gurowitsch played Eugen d'Albert's cello concerto, with the composer himself accompanying her on piano. She made her American debut in 1910, with the New York Symphony Orchestra, under conductor Walter Damrosch. In 1913 she made a recording of the Kol Nidre, and headlined a "Russian Music Carnival" at Carnegie Hall.

In 1914, she toured on the lyceum circuit with baritone Marcus A. Kellerman. In 1916, she played at a concert of Jewish music at Columbia University. She played a concert at Bushwick High School in 1917. "She has a splendid command of her instrument," commented one reviewer in 1919, "gets a beautiful tone, and plays with sureness and soulful interpretation."

Gurowitsch left the professional stage after marriage in 1919, but she occasionally played at Jewish women's events in Bergen County, New Jersey. For example, in 1931 she played at a women's meeting of the YMHA, and in 1939 she performed at a local meeting of the National Council of Jewish Women.

== Personal life ==
Sarah Gurowitsch married a fellow Russian immigrant, Samuel Benjamin Leight, in 1919. Their sons Lawrence and Donald became musicians; another son, Edward, became an illustrator. Playwright and television producer Warren Leight is Sarah Gurowitsch's grandson. Her husband died in 1970. Sarah Gurowitsch Leight died in 1981, aged 92 years.
