= Mayke Rademakers =

Dutch cellist

Mayke Rademakers is a Dutch cellist.

== Life and career ==
Rademakers received her first cello lessons from Hungarian cellist György Schiffer. From the age of 16 she attended masterclasses by André Navarra at the summer school of the Accademia Chigiana in Siena, Italy. She then studied with André Navarra in Vienna. After 2 years she continued her studies with William Pleeth in London and with a Fulbright grant with János Starker. Her final examination at the Academy of Music in Utrecht was awarded cum laude.

Rademakers gave many recitals, chamber music concerts, broadcasts and solo concerts in Europe and in the Aspen Festival. She and her duo pianist Matthijs Verschoor were awarded the silver medal by the Societé Academique Arts –Sciences-Lettres in Paris for their commitment to the French music.

In 2015 Rademakers made her debut at Challenge Records International. Recently she performs with the Gauguin Ensemble, with pianist Loes van Ras and clarinetist Yfynke Hoogeveen.

== Discography ==
- Bosmans & Bridge (2008)
- Bach (2014)
- Stagioni (2018)
