= Daniel Moerman =

American medical anthropologist and ethnobotanist (1941–2026)

Daniel Ellis Moerman
- Born: July 21, 1941; Paterson, New Jersey, U.S.
- Died: January 9, 2026 (aged 84)
- Education: University of Michigan
- Known for: Work in ethnobotany and the placebo effect
- Awards: University of Michigan Distinguished Faculty Governance Award (1991)
- Scientific career
- Fields: Medical anthropology
- Workplaces: University of Michigan-Dearborn
- Thesis: Extended family and popular medicine on St. Helena Island, S.C.: adaptations to marginality (1974)

Daniel Ellis Moerman (July 21, 1941 – January 9, 2026) was an American medical anthropologist and ethnobotanist, and an emeritus professor of anthropology at the University of Michigan-Dearborn. He is known for his work relating to Native American ethnobotany and the placebo effect.

== Education and career ==
Moerman was born in Paterson, New Jersey. He received his AB, MA and PhD degrees in anthropology from the University of Michigan in 1963, 1965, and 1974, respectively. He became a professor of anthropology at the University of Michigan-Dearborn in 1984, and was appointed the William E. Stirton Professor of Anthropology at the university in 1994.

== Research ==
Moerman spent over 25 years developing a catalogue of over 4,000 plants used by Native Americans for medicinal purposes. He has also published studies on the placebo effect, one of which found that more people with stomach ulcers were healed when taking four placebos per day than when taking two.

== Death ==
Moerman died on January 9, 2026, at the age of 84.

== Awards and honors ==
In 1991, Moerman became the first faculty member at the University of Michigan's Dearborn campus to receive the university's Distinguished Faculty Governance Award.
