= Ivan Hewett =

British music critic

- Education: University of Oxford; Royal College of Music
- Occupations: Music critic; author
- Notable credit: The Daily Telegraph

Ivan Hewett is a British music critic and author who specializes in classical music. Since 2009 he has been the chief music critic for British newspaper The Daily Telegraph. Hewett has a particular interest in contemporary classical music, which was the topic of his 2003 book Music: Healing the Rift. He is also active as a radio and television presenter.

== Life and career ==
Ivan Hewett studied music at the University of Oxford, receiving a Master of Arts. He then attended the Royal College of Music to study music composition, and wrote music for television commercials for a year. Throughout the 1980s and in to the 1990s, Hewett unsuccessfully attempted to start a music festival, did research for the Man and Music programme, on Granada TV, and assisted with Jonathan Miller's TV performance of Bach's St Matthew Passion. He has contributed to music publications such as The Musical Times and Prospect since the 1980s. At various times, Hewett has also worked as a lecturer, broadcaster and composer.

By the 1990s, Hewett began presenting on music for the BBC Radio 3; from 1993 to 2002 he led the weekly programme "Music Matters". Since 2009, he has been chief music critic for British newspaper The Daily Telegraph, having succeeded Geoffrey Norris. His interests include the composition, reception and harmony of contemporary classical music. His interests in modern music culminated in a 2003 book entitled Music: Healing the Rift, described as a "very personal view" on the topic. Other publications by Hewett include a chapter for The Proms: A New History (2006) book on The Proms, and The Other Classical Musics: Fifteen Great Traditions (2015) on art music around the world.

Since the late 1990s, Hewett has been a professor at the Royal College of Music.

== Selected writings ==
=== Books and chapters ===
- Hewett, Ivan (2003). Music: Healing the Rift. London: Continuum. ISBN 978-0-8264-5939-8.
- —— (2006). "Joining the Queue: Audiences for the Proms". In Doctor, Jennifer Ruth; Wright, David C. H. (eds.). The Proms: A New History. London: Thames & Hudson. pp. 210–231. ISBN 978-0-500-51352-1.
- —— (2015). "Europe". In Church, Michael (ed.). The Other Classical Musics: Fifteen Great Traditions. Woodbridge: Boydell Press. ISBN 978-1-84383-726-8.

=== Articles ===
- Hewett, Ivan (15 October 2015). "Krzysztof Penderecki and London Philharmonic Orchestra, review: 'flawed'". The Daily Telegraph. (subscription required)
- —— (17 January 2022). "Encore! What it's like to take part in a 24-hour, non-stop classical concert". The Daily Telegraph. (subscription required)
- —— (18 April 2022). "Sir Harrison Birtwistle obituary". The Guardian.
