= Ma Sicong =

Chinese violinist and composer

- 馬思聰
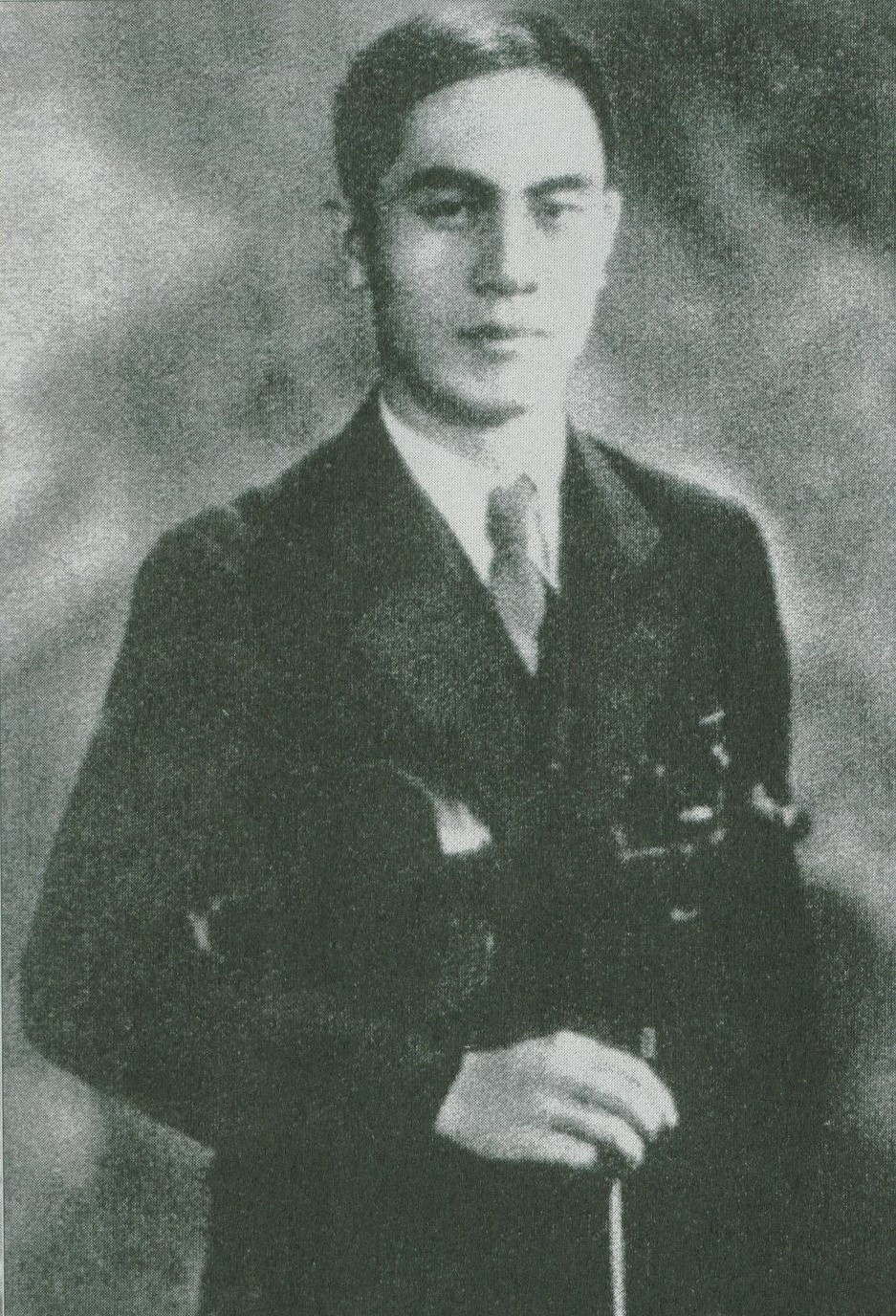
- Born: May 7, 1912; Haifeng, Guangdong province, China
- Died: May 20, 1987 (aged 75); Philadelphia, Pennsylvania, U.S.
- Education: Conservatoire de Paris
- Occupations: Violinist, Composer
- Known for: King of Violinists

Ma Sicong (simplified Chinese: 马思聪; traditional Chinese: 馬思聰; pinyin: Mǎ Sīcōng; Wade–Giles: Ma Szu-ts'ung; May 7, 1912 – May 20, 1987) was a Chinese violinist and composer. He was referred to in China as "The King of Violinists." His Nostalgia (思鄉曲) for violin, composed in 1937 as part of the Inner Mongolia Suite (內蒙組曲), is considered one of the most favorite pieces of 20th century China.

In early 1932, Ma returned to China, and got married in the same year to Wang Muli (王慕理). In the following period, he composed many renowned pieces such as Lullaby, Inner Mongolia suite, Tibet tone poem (西藏音詩), and Madrigal (牧歌). Ma was appointed president of the newly established Central Conservatory of Music in Beijing by the government of the People's Republic of China in December 1949.

When the Cultural Revolution broke out in June 1966, Ma became a target of the Chinese government and its Red Guards. On the night of January 15, 1967, Ma and his family managed to escape to Hong Kong by boat. While in Hong Kong, Ma contacted Nancy Zi (Hsu Meifen 徐美芬), daughter of Ma's eldest sister Ma Sijin (马思锦). On behalf of Ma reuniting with his youngest brother Ma Sihong (马思宏) in New York City, Zi contacted the US Consulate in Hong Kong, leading to Ma's escape to the United States with escorts provided by the consulate itself.

In May 1967, a special file was opened to investigate the circumstances of Ma's escape, under the leadership of Kang Sheng, head of the Central Investigation Agency, and Xie Fuzhi, the Minister of Public Security. Many of Ma's friends and family members were subsequently implicated. In 1968, a standing warrant was issued for Ma's arrest for treason, and the charge was not retracted until 1985.

== Early life ==
On May 7, 1912, Ma Sicong was born in Haifeng, Guangdong province.

His father Ma Yuhang (馬育航) was a colleague and confidant of revolutionary figure Chen Jiongming. After the Wuchang Uprising, Ma's father became the finance minister of Guangdong. Ma's mother Huang Chuliang (黃楚良), also from Haifeng. Ma Sicong was the fifth of ten children. Most of Ma's siblings became musicians in their own right, e.g. Ma Sisun (馬思荪), Ma Siju (馬思琚), Ma Sihong (马思宏), and Ma Siyun (馬思芸). Some of their children also became well known musicians.

According to Ma Sicong's 1937 autobiography, he did not come from a particularly musical family. His interest in music began at age five, when he sang along with his grandfather's gramophone recording. He started playing the piano when he was seven, and two years later the harmonica and the yueqin when he went to a boarding school in Guangdong. In the summer of 1923, Ma Sicong's brother returned to France from his studies, and brought Ma Sicong a violin. The 11-year-old immediately fell in love with the instrument, and decided to follow his brother to France to study the violin.

== Education ==
Ma and his brother arrived in Paris, France in the winter of 1923. Their first place of residence was in Fontainebleau, and later in a family house. In the first six months, Ma had four violin teachers, the last of whom was a graduate of Conservatoire de Paris.

Ma proved to be a fast learner, and in 1925, he was admitted to the Music Conservatory of Nancy, an affiliate of the Conservatoire de Paris. There he played the violin with his landlady's pianist daughter. In summer of 1926, Ma won second prize by playing a concerto by Niccolò Paganini, but he was dissatisfied with his performance and progress. So he returned to Paris in August of the same year.

Through a friend, Ma became a student of violinist Paul Oberdoerffer at the Conservatoire de Paris. At the same time, he also studied the piano with Oberdoerffer's wife. However, in March 1927, he developed a neck condition, and had to stop playing. He spent his time in the coastal city of Berck, concentrating on the piano, and became familiar with many composers, with Claude Debussy being his most favorite.

In the fall of 1928, Ma returned to France. Ma was officially admitted to the Conservatoire de Paris in Paris, France. Ma majored in violin. There he met future Chinese composer Xian Xinghai, and Ma recommended Xian to also study under Oberdoerffer.

== Career ==
=== Concerts in China ===
Ma returned to China in 1929 due to financial difficulties. He gave concerts in Chinese cities including Hong Kong, Guangzhou, and Nanjing. In Shanghai, critics referred him as the "Wunderkind of the Chinese Musical World", and his music was "mesmerizing, and uplighting", and "brought the audience to new levels of excitement and tranquility". He met Chinese novelist Lu Xun, who inspired him to compose the Seven classic poems. In January, 1930, Ma returned to Guangzhou, and became first violin of the orchestra of the Research Institute for Dramatic Arts in Guangdong (廣東戲劇研究所).

With financial support from the Guangdong regional government, Ma returned to France in 1931 to study composition. Through Oberdoerffer, Ma became a student of Janko Binenbaum, a Turkish composer of Jewish descent, who served as musical director in Regensburg, Hamburg, and Berlin. Though he led a private life, Binenbaum's compositions had a unique style. "It was not melancholy, but rather some kind of Greek tragedy. There was passion like fire, the passion of music that could not be reined," Ma wrote describing Binenbaum's music. Despite the forty-year age difference between the two, Binenbaum had great influence on Ma's composition, and they became close friends. When the second world war broke out, Ma lost contact with Binenbaum and, according to Ma, "Then I did not know to which country he fled. It was, indeed, one of the saddest moment for me."

=== Youth and musical career in China ===
In early 1932, the 19-year-old Ma completed his studies and returned to China. With his colleague Chen Hong (陳洪) he established a private conservatory in Guangzhou. There he met pianist Wang Muli (王慕理), who was two years his senior. They were married later that year. The following year, Ma passed the administration of the conservatory to Chen, and went to Shanghai. He sought a position at the National Conservatory of Shanghai, but was rejected. Then, through introduction, he became a lecturer at the Central University of Nanjing. The Ma family rented a property from fellow artist Xu Beihong.

In Nanjing, Ma resumed his concert career, and composed his Piano Trio in B major. In February 1934, Ma collaborated with pianist Harry Ore, who had been a classmate of Sergei Prokofiev, and composed the Violin sonata No. 1 in G major. Ma and Ore continued concertizing in 1935 in Hong Kong. In February, Ma composed the song, You are my life (你是我的生命線), which became his first publicly performed work. In August, Ma and his wife returned to Hong Kong and performed recitals there, and met Xian Xinghai for the second and last time. He also completed the Berceuse (搖籃曲) for violin. Later that year, he wrote his autobiography, entitled Chasing my childhood (童年追想曲), serialized and published in Shanghai. In early 1936, Ma organized a concert for his 13-year-old brother Ma Sihong. His future wife Tung Kwong Kwong (董光光) was at the piano. Ma and his wife traveled north to Beijing and held concerts there. They became acquainted with novelist Chen Ying (沉櫻) and her husband. Ma also composed his Sonata No. 2 in b minor later that year.

=== Sino-Japanese War, Pacific War, and Chinese Civil war ===
Ma resigned his position in Nanjing in 1937, to accept a professorship at the Sun Yat-sen University in Guangdong. However, on July 7, 1937, the Sino-Japanese War broke out. Ma became the director of the patriotic Anti-Japanese Choir, and made many media appearances and recordings. He wrote a large number of patriotic songs during this period, such as The Call for Freedom (自由的號聲), Forward (前進), Guerilla squadron hymn (游擊隊歌), Defend south China (保衛華南) Wang Fah Gong (黃花崗), and From death comes eternal life (不是死是永生). He composed the Inner Mongolia Suite (內蒙組曲). Its second movement, Nostalgia (思鄉曲), would later become synonymous with Ma.

In December 1938, he was commissioned by the Dong River Traveling Chorus to compose their anthem for the troupe. On January 29, 1939, Ma's father Ma Yuhang was assassinated in Shanghai, and Ma's first daughter Ma Bixue (馬碧雪) was born in Hong Kong only two days later. In the summer of the same year, Ma and his family moved to Chengjiang (徵江) to accept a teaching position there. In Chengjiang, Ma completed the Sonata No. 1 for Piano. Ma went to Chongqing, where he met left-wing musicologist Li Ling (李凌). In June 1940, Ma became the conductor of the Sino Philharmonic, and met poet Xu Chi (徐遲). He also wrote the incidental music to the film An Exploration of Tibet (西藏巡禮).

In Summer of 1941, Ma left Chongqing for Hong Kong, but returned to his home Heifeng when the Pacific War broke out on December 8, where he arrived in February 1942. The music from the Inner Mongolia Suite was used in the 1942 film Chronicles of the Fringes (of China) (塞上風雲), and the music was hailed national heritage by Tsui. Ma's family relocated to Guilin in April, where he held concerts, and met novelist Duanmu Hongliang. He returned to Guangdong to resume teaching at Sun Yat-sen University, and published articles in academic musical journals. In spring of 1943, Ma's second daughter, Ma Ruixue (馬瑞雪), was born. In 1944, with the Japanese army approaching, Ma and his family fled to Wuzhou in neighboring Guangxi province, then on September 23 to Liuzhou, and Guilin on October 11, and a week later to Guiyang as each of the regions fell to Japanese hands. By the end of 1944, the Ma family returned to Chongqing. In this period, Ma composed the Madrigal (牧歌), and Harvest Dance (秋收舞曲). In 1945, Ma gave concerts in Chongqing and surrounding areas, and published a number of songs: The Light of Democracy (和平之光), Sabre Dance (劍舞) and "Shuyi" (述異).

In 1946, after the Japanese surrendered, Ma was still the director of the Center of Fine Arts in Guiyang. In collaboration with writer Duanmu Hongliang, Ma composed the grand chorus Democracy (民主大合唱). Ma returned to Shanghai in spring of 1946, and was elected general manager of the Music Society of Shanghai. In July 1946, Ma moved to Taiwan, and in August 1946, his only son Ma Rulong (馬如龍) was born in Taiwan. In November, he returned to Shanghai and met with delegates Zhou Enlai, Qiao Guanhua and Gong Peng. In November, Ma returned to Guangzhou and became the Dean of Music at the Guangdong College of Fine Arts, and in May 1947, under the encouragement of Li Ling, Ma became the director of the Music Conservatory of Hong Kong. While there, Ma gave recitals, and took on the editorship of the Music Weekly of newspaper Sing Tao Daily. He collaborated with poet Jin Fan (金帆), and composed the grand chorus Motherland (祖國大合唱). Ma's family moved to Hong Kong in early 1948 to escape prosecution, as a result of his protest against authoritarian rule by the Kuomintang government. When John Leighton Stuart, the US Ambassador to China, offered Ma and his family an opportunity to live in the US and US citizen, Ma rejected the offer. While in Hong Kong, Ma also composed the grand chorus Spring (春天大合唱).

=== The Founding of the People's Republic of China ===
On March 24, 1949, took on roles in a number of central government committees dedicated to the performing arts. His family resided in Beijing. In November 1949, Ma was requested by Zhou Enlai to be part of an entourage in an official visit to the Soviet Union. And on December 18, 1949, Ma was appointed first president of the Central Conservatory of Music in Beijing, which had opened November 17, 1949. In addition, Ma also held the vice-chairmanship of the Association of Chinese Musicians (中華全國音樂工作者協會).

Ma and his family moved once again to Tianjin, and there Ma composed Tribute of October (十月禮讚), We enter the battlefield with bravery (我們勇敢地奔向戰場) and grand chorus Yalu River (鴨綠江大合唱). In May and June 1951, Ma represented China to attend The Prague Spring International Music Festival (Mezinárodní hudební festival Pražské jaro) in Czechoslovakia. After holding various administrative positions, Ma was appointed a delegate of the First National People's Congress in September 1954 and returned to Beijing. In 1957, Ma embarked on a concert tour of China, the first large-scale concert series in China since the establishment of the People's Republic of China, and received critical acclaim. In March 1958, Ma served on the jury for the First Tchaikovsky International Competition.

=== The Cultural Revolution ===
In February 1966, Ma composed The Elegy for Jiao Yulu (焦裕祿悼歌), which would become his last composition to be composed in China. The Cultural Revolution broke out in early June, 1966 and Ma became the target of the revolutionary Anti Academic Elitism movement (反動學術權威). Along with colleagues at the Central Conservatory, Ma was assigned to re-education camp, and later was placed under house arrest. The Red Guards harassed Ma's family and, in August, confiscated all of the family's property. Ma's wife escaped with her children and they hid at her sister's home in Nanjing and shortly after in Danzao (丹灶). In November, Ma was diagnosed with hepatitis and was permitted to return home for recovery. He left Beijing to reunite with his family. On January 15, 1967, Ma and his family fled to Hong Kong by boat, an event that was known colloquially as en passant (上卒), after the chess move. From Hong Kong, Ma traveled to the United States, where he remained until his death in 1987.

His escape was investigated by the Chinese government. The investigation was led by Kang Sheng, head of the Central Investigation Agency, and Xie Fuzhi, the Minister of Public Security. Many of Ma's friends and family members were subsequently implicated. In 1968, a standing warrant was issued for Ma's arrest for treason. The charge was not retracted until 1985. His Nostalgia became his most famous work, renamed as The East is Red (東方紅), a propaganda piece glorifying both Mao Zedong and Communism.

=== Exile in the United States ===
In the United States, he wrote music for the ballet Sunset Clouds (晚霞), and composed the opera Rebia (熱碧亞). Like many other nationalist composers, he integrated national folk elements with western music structure. He also continued his compositions of Chinese patriotic music in the US, and he seldom discussed his experience during the Cultural Revolution in public. When President Richard Nixon and Secretary of State Henry Kissinger visited China in 1972, Zhou Enlai expressed his regret for the persecution and escape of Ma.

Ma visited Taiwan several times to find new musical inspiration, collecting elements of Chinese folk music and incorporating them in his compositions. In June 1985, when Ma and his wife were in their seventies, they toured Europe to critical acclaim.

== Personal life ==
In 1932, Ma married Wang Muli. In 1939, Ma's daughter Ma Bixue was born in Hong Kong. In 1943, Ma's second daughter Ma Ruixue, known in English as Celia, was born. They also had a son, Julon, born c. 1947. Both Julon and Ruixue settled in the United States, while Bixue remained in China. Ma lived a low profile life in the United States.

=== Death ===
In 1987, Ma died during a heart operation in Philadelphia. Ma was 75. Ma had authorized the high-risk procedure, and was hoping to visit China had it been successful.

=== Legacy ===
The Ma Sicong Museum of Musical Arts (馬思聰音樂藝術館) was opened in 2002. It is located in the Guangzhou Museum of Art in Guangzhou, China.

In December 2007, the Chinese government held ceremonies for welcoming Ma's ashes to his home town of Haifeng. Meanwhile, his music and letters were issued, including a 13-CD collection of his musical works. From then on, China began to rediscover the value of Ma's music and many other accomplishments.

== Selected compositions ==
Concertos

- Violin Concerto in F major, 1944
- Concerto for Two Violins, 1983
- Cello Concerto, 1958–1960

Symphonic works

- Symphony No.1, 1941–1942
- Symphony No.2, 1958–1959
- Song of Wooded Mountain (山林之歌), 1953–1954
- Suite of Joy (欢喜组曲), 1949

Choral works

- Democracy Cantata (民主大合唱), 1946
- Homeland Cantata (祖國大合唱), 1947
- Spring Cantata (春天大合唱), 1948
- Huai-River Cantata (淮河大合唱), 1956

Violin pieces

- Lullaby (搖籃曲), 1935
- Inner Mongolia Suite (內蒙組曲) 1937
- Tone Poem of Tibetan (西藏音詩), 1941
- Pastoral Song (牧歌), 1944
- Dance of Autumn Harvest (秋收舞曲) 1944
- Lyric Melody (抒情曲) (1952)
- Dragon Lantern Dance (跳龍燈) 1952
- Mountain Song (山歌) 1952
- Spring Dance (春天舞曲), 1953
- Pouring out slowly (慢訴) 1952
- Rondo No. I, 1937
- Rondo No. II, 1950
- Rondo No. III, 1983
- Rondo No. IV, 1984
- Xinjiang Rhapsody (新疆狂想曲) (1954)
- Kaoshan Suite (高山組曲), 1973.
- Amis Suite (阿美組曲), 1973

Chamber Music

- Violin Duo, 1982
- Piano Quintet, 1954
- String Quartet No. 2 Op.10, 1938
- Piano Trio in B♭ major, 1933
- Violin Sonata No.1, 1934
- Violin Sonata No.2, 1936
- Violin Sonata No.3, 1984

Opera & Ballet

- Ballet, Sunset Clouds (晚霞)
- Opera, Rebia (熱碧亞), 1980

Piano Works

- Three Pieces for Piano, 1961
- Three Dances, 1952
- Three Pieces of Cantonese Music, 1952–1953
- Sonatina No.4, 1956

Songs

- Song cycle: After Rain, 1943
- In memory of Xian Xinghai, 1946
- Prosecution, 1947
- Song of Chinese Young Pioneers, 1950
- Spring Water, 1962

== Additional sources ==
- Grove Dictionary of music;
- Biography of Ma Sicong, Written by Ye Yonglie (1940-), ISBN 7219052383;
- Jugaoshengziyuan, (collection of Ma's essays), ISBN 7-5306-2927-1;
- A chronicle of Ma Sicong, Zhang Jingwei, 2004, ISBN 7-5059-4654-4;
- On Ma Sicong, Ma Sicong Editorial Committee, 1997, ISBN 7-103-01597-X.
