= Angus McLaren (historian) =

Canadian historian (1942–2024)

Angus McLaren FRSC (December 20, 1942 – June 7, 2024) was professor emeritus of history at the University of Victoria in British Columbia, and a leading figure in the history of sexuality.

== Early life and education ==
McLaren was born to Lillian (née Brown) and Thomas Smiles McLaren in East Vancouver. He completed a honours degree in French history from the University of British Columbia in 1965. After graduation and marrying Arlene Tigar, he pursued, thanks to a Woodrow Wilson Fellowship, a PhD in history at Harvard University.

Motivated by an interest to go to Paris, he continued in French history and conducted research during the tumultuous years surrounding May 68 in Paris. After deciding not to continue his research on an unknown and obscure French journalist, he shifted his final year at Harvard University. He worked as an assistant to visiting scholar, Theodore Zeldin, who demonstrated how studying history could examine the passions and practices of everyday life. This experienced redirected McLaren's career to focus on the history of sexuality, gender, and reproduction.

== Career ==
At the beginning of his academic career, McLaren taught at the University of Calgary and then Grinnell College. From 1975 to 2007, the University of Victoria was his academic home. He was also a Visiting Fellow at St. Anthony's College, Oxford, a Life Fellow at Clare Hall, Cambridge, and a Visiting Hannah Professor of the History of Medicine at the University of Toronto.

SSHRC (Social Sciences and Humanities Research Council) generously supported his research. McLaren was the author of more than a dozen books; some were translated into many languages. As a socio-cultural historian of medicine, he drew upon legal, medical, archival, newspaper, and literary sources over a range of issues from birth control, abortion, impotence (erectile dysfunction), masculinity, and eugenics in Western contexts such as France, UK, and North America. He was known to have skillfully challenged the boundaries of existing scholarship. With the sociologist Arlene Tigar McLaren, he wrote the first book on the history of birth control and abortion in Canada, The Bedroom and the State: The Changing Practices and Politics of Contraception and Abortion in Canada, 1880-1980.

== Personal life ==
For several decades, McLaren lived in Vancouver with his spouse, Arlene, and son, Jesse, and commuted by ferry to his university in Victoria. During the last few years of his life, he struggled with Parkinson's Disease.

== Awards and honours ==
McLaren won numerous scholarly awards for his work – including the1993 Hannah Medal (history of medicine) by the Royal Society of Canada for his book Our Own Master Race: Eugenics in Canada, 1885-1945, and the 2008 Bonnie and Vern L Bullough Book Award (history of sexuality) by the Society for the Scientific Study of Sexuality for his book Impotence: A Cultural History. McLaren was made a Fellow of the Royal Society of Canada in 1999, and in 2003 was named University of Victoria Distinguished Professor.

In 2008 he was awarded the prestigious Molson prize that recognizes outstanding lifetime achievements to the cultural and intellectual life of Canada. As the Molson jury explained: 'Angus McLaren is an imaginative and prolific historian who has increased significantly our understanding of sexuality, gender and reproduction, and other related topics'. McLaren was the first historian in western Canada to receive the award.

To continue his legacy, a scholarship was established at the University of Victoria: Dr. Angus McLaren Graduate Scholarship in Social History of Medicine, Sexuality, Reproduction and/or Gender.

== Selected publications ==
  - McLaren, Angus (1978). Birth Control in Nineteenth-Century England. London, United Kingdom: Croom Helm. ISBN 9780856645044
  - McLaren, Angus (1983). Sexuality and Social Order: The Debate over the Fertility of Women and Workers in France, 1770-1920. London, United Kingdom: Holmes and Meier Publishers. ISBN 9780841907447
  - McLaren, Angus (1984). Reproductive Rituals: The Perception of Fertility in England from the Sixteenth Century to the Nineteenth Century. London, United Kingdom: Routledge. ISBN 9780367434519
  - McLaren, Angus and McLaren, Arlene Tigar (1986). The Bedroom and the State: The Changing Practices and Politics of Contraception and Abortion in Canada, 1880-1980. Toronto: McClelland and Stewart. ISBN 9780195413182
  - McLaren, Angus (1990). Our Own Master Race: Eugenics in Canada, 1885-1945. Toronto, Canada: University of Toronto Press. ISBN 9781442659643
  - McLaren, Angus (1992). A History of Contraception: From Antiquity to the Present Day, Oxford, United Kingdom: Blackwell Publishing. ISBN 9780631187295
  - McLaren, Angus (1993). A Prescription for Murder: The Victorian Serial Killings of Dr. Thomas Neill Cream. Chicago, IL: University of Chicago Press. ISBN 9780226560687
  - McLaren, Angus (1997). The Trials of Masculinity: Policing Sexual Boundaries, 1870-1930. Chicago, IL: University of Chicago Press. ISBN 9780226500690
  - McLaren, Angus (1999). Twentieth-Century Sexuality: A History. Oxford, United Kingdom: Blackwell Publishing. ISBN 9780631208129
  - McLaren, Angus (2002). Sexual Blackmail: A Modern History. Cambridge, MA: Harvard University Press. ISBN 9780674009240
  - McLaren, Angus (2007). Impotence: A Cultural History. Chicago, IL: University of Chicago Press. ISBN 9780226500935
  - McLaren, Angus (2012). Reproduction by Design: Sex, Robots, Trees, and Test-Tube Babies in Interwar Britain. Chicago, IL: University of Chicago Press. ISBN 9780226560694
  - McLaren, Angus (2017). Playboys and Mayfair Men: Crime, Class, Masculinity, and Fascism in 1930s London. Baltimore, MD: Johns Hopkins University Press. ISBN 9781421423470
