= Ma Siju =

Chinese musician (1920–2014)

- Chinese: 馬思琚
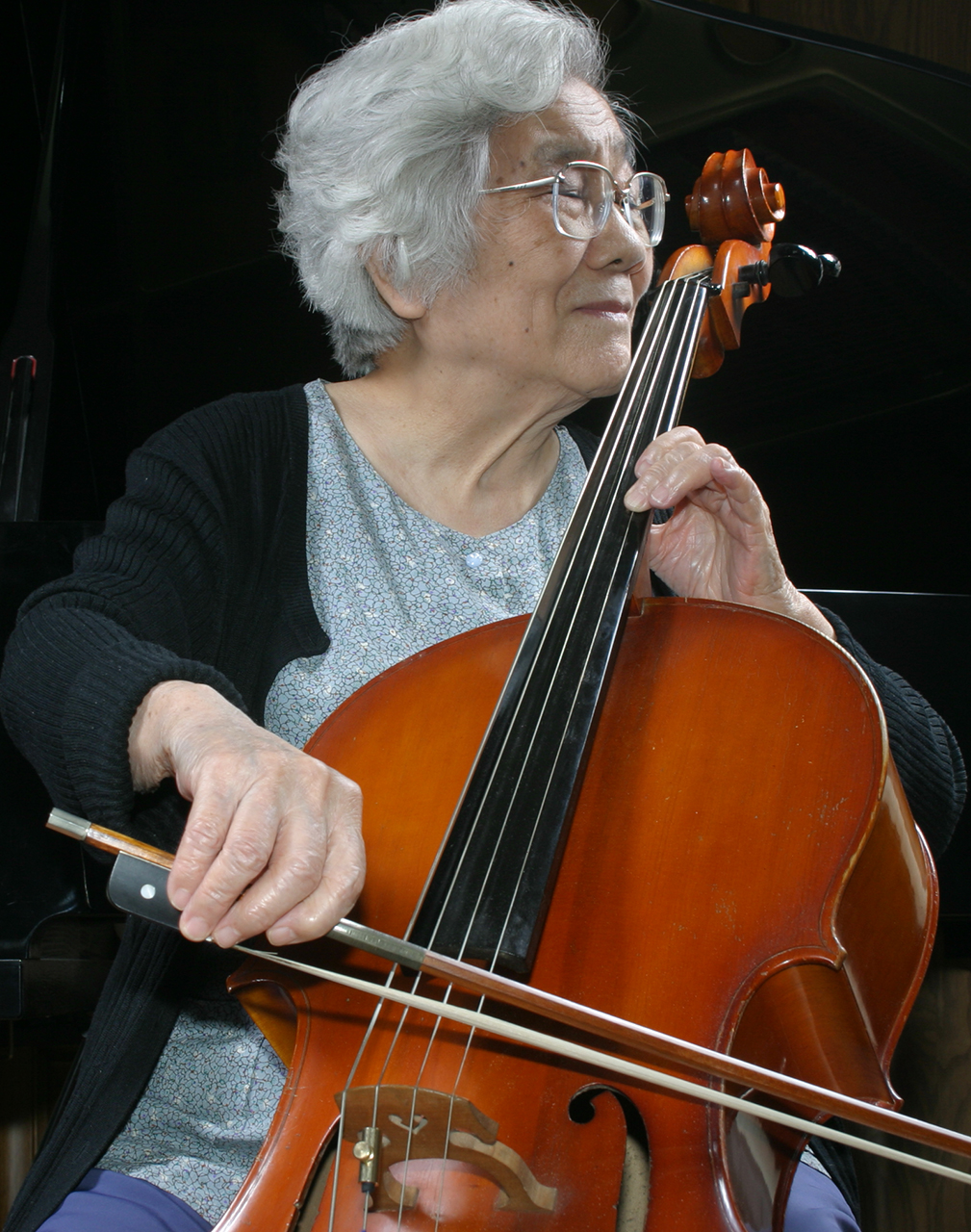
- Ma Siju playing cello at home
- Born: Ma Siju; April 25, 1920; Guangdong province, China
- Died: October 13, 2014 (aged 94)
- Occupations: Pianist, Cellist and Musical Educator
- Known for: Cellist, Dean of Central Conservatory of Music
- Father: Ma Yuhang

Ma Siju was a Chinese pianist, cellist.

== Early life ==
On April 25, 1920, Ma was born as Ma Siju in Haifeng county in Guangdong Province, China. Ma's father was Ma Yuhang. Ma had a musical family, her older brother was the well-known Chinese violinist, composer and music educator Ma Sicong (b.1912). Ma's other siblings include brother Ma Sihong (b. 1922), sister Ma Sisun and Ma Siyun are all Chinese first generation classical musicians.

Ma started learning piano when she was 10 years old. In 1934, Ma moved to Shanghai with her family.

Ma's brother Ma Sicong, gave her music lessons while he taught in the music department at National Central University in Nanking. Ma accepted Ma Sicong's advice and starting learning cello.

In 1936, Ma's father was transferred, and she moved back to Guangdong Province with her parents and younger sister, Ma Siyun. There she continued studying music. In 1937, after the Marco Polo Bridge Incident, her family moved to Hong Kong, but she never stopped playing piano and cello. Her piano teacher was Latvian musician Harry Ore, and her cello teacher was Italian musician Pelligatti. She worked well with both instructors, and improved quickly, especially on the piano.

On January 29, 1939, Ma's father was assassinated in Shanghai, China.

== Career ==
In 1938, at Harry Ore's recommendation, Ma Siju auditioned to perform for BBC World Service in Hong Kong, and was accepted. She performed once every two months, giving her ample opportunity to improve her musical skills.

In 1943, Ma accepted Zhao Meibo's invitation to teach cello and piano in Xi'an Northwestern Musical College. She also held concerts there. Later, after WWII, Ma was hired by Qingmuguan National Musical College to teach piano and cello, as well as sight reading and solfège. When the college later relocated to the south, Ma Siju served as concertmaster for the Shanghai Town Hall Orchestra and the Nanjing Zhonghua Symphony Orchestra. At the same, she studied piano with Russian musician Denys Proshayev.

In 1948, Ma became the Vice President and Dean of the Music Department of the China-Soviet Union Amateur Dancing College. During this period, Ma taught classes and organized performing tours. Ma also performed in the tours both as pianist and cellist.

In 1954, Ma became the Dean of the Piano Department at Central Conservatory of Music, where she taught piano. In 1957, because the shortage of the cello teacher, Ma transferred from piano department to the Orchestra Department, taught cello at the Central Conservatory of Music until her retirement.

Ma retired from Central Conservatory of Music in 1986.

== Personal life ==
1947, Ma married a Chinese architect Wang Tan who later taught in Qinghua University, School of Architecture and was the vice dean of the School.

In 1948, Ma following her husband moved to Northeastern liberated region of China.

They have two daughters, Zhen-Mei Wang, and Zhen-Ping Wang. The family lived in Beijing. Ma stared both her daughters musical lessons. Ma's daughter Zhen-Mei Wang is a professional pianist, instructor and reference librarian.

Ma died from an illness in Beijing, China, on October 13, 2014. She was 94.

== Achievement ==
Publishing "Amateur Piano Practice Compositions."

Translated "Casals and the art of interpretation"

Co- translated with her colleague A.B. Abaza's "Chorus Knowledge and Conducting."

== See also ==
- Ma Sicong
