= Marc Hellerstein =

American scientist and physician

- Education: Brandeis University; Yale School of Medicine; Massachusetts Institute of Technology
- Scientific career
- Institutions: University of California, San Francisco; University of California, Berkeley

Marc K. Hellerstein is an American physician-scientist and professor of human nutrition, metabolism, and medicine. He is Professor of Human Nutrition at the University of California, Berkeley, where he has occupied two Endowed Chairs Doris Calloway Chair and Dr. Robert C. and Veronica Atkins Chair. He is also Professor of Endocrinology, Metabolism and Nutrition in the Department of Medicine at the University of California at San Francisco. His research focuses on the quantitative measurement of metabolic fluxes in vivo as biomarkers for human health, disease, and translational medicine.

== Biography and career ==
Hellerstein graduated from Brandeis University as Valedictorian (Louis B. Brandeis scholar of the School of Science), received his medical degree from Yale School of Medicine and completed a PhD at the Massachusetts Institute of Technology (MIT). He subsequently trained in internal medicine and in endocrinology and metabolism and is ABIM Board certified in Internal Medicine and in Endocrinology and Medicine.

Hellerstein moved to the San Francisco Bay Area approximately four decades ago to pursue medical research, teaching and clinical practice. At UCSF, he is Professor of Medicine and Nutrition, Endocrinology and Metabolism and directed the diabetes clinic at San Francisco General Hospital for approximately 25 years. In parallel, he has served as Professor of Human Nutrition on the faculty at UC Berkeley, where he became a leading figure in the Department of Metabolic Biology and Nutrition.

In addition to his academic appointments, Hellerstein has served on editorial boards of scientific journals and as an advisor to organizations including NASA and the Office of AIDS Research, National Institutes of Health.

Hellerstein was a co-founder with David Fineman of KineMed, Inc., Emeryville, CA (2001–2016), a biotechnology company focused on metabolic biomarkers for drug development and diagnostics.

He served as Chief of Scientific Advisory Board and President. In 2023, he co-founded with William Evans Ph.D. Myo Corps, Inc., Raleigh N.C., a company developing diagnostic approaches related to muscle mass and metabolism, where he serves as president and chairman of the board.

In 2017, Hellerstein started the Hellerstein Foundation as an artist support-centered public charity in the Bay Area.

== Research ==
Hellerstein's research focuses on quantifying metabolic fluxes in vivo as biomarkers for human health and disease. He pioneered the use of stable isotope tracers with mass spectrometry and mathematical modeling to measure metabolic processes that were previously inaccessible, including the measurement of protein turnover, lipid synthesis, cell proliferation, and organ-specific fluxes non-invasively (“virtual biopsies”).

Methodological innovations from his laboratory include Mass Isotopomer Distribution Analysis (MIDA), heavy water (²H₂O) labeling of proteins, including flux proteomics, and labeling of DNA for cell proliferation, as well as global metabolic fluxomics.

He has published over 350 papers, holds 80 U.S. and international patents, and is a fellow of the American Society of Clinical Investigation.

His 2019 Nature paper on long-lived T-cell memory was named Society of Vaccinology Paper of the Year, and during the COVID-19 pandemic he emphasized the importance of evaluating cellular immunity alongside antibodies for vaccine effectiveness.
