= Rozsi Varady =

Hungarian cellist

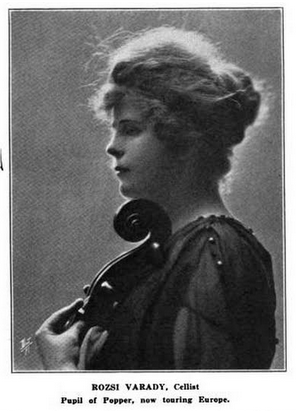
Rozsi Varady, from a 1922 publication.

Rozsi Varady (March 4, 1902 − December 19, 1933) was a concert cellist who was popular in both the United States and Europe.

== Biography ==
She was born in Budapest; her father was Wilhelm Varady. She graduated from the Royal Academy of Budapest and was the first woman to receive the academy's "Artist Diploma". She studied with Pablo Casals. She debuted in America in 1921, and was invited to perform at a State Dinner at the White House before President and Mrs. Harding on February 2, 1922. Varady appeared as a soloist and together with Clemens Krauss in 1926 at the Salzburg Festival.

In 1929 she married Joseph Anthony, an author and editor. Varady also became a naturalized US citizen in 1929. She died at the Park Central Hotel in New York on December 19, 1933, of heart disease.
