= Suite for Cello and Piano (Saint-Saëns) =

Suite

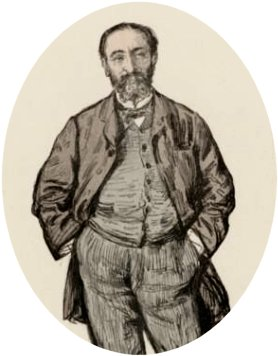
Saint-Saëns in 1875

The Suite for Cello and Piano, Op. 16, was written by Camille Saint-Saëns in 1866. This work is considered the launching point of the composer's career.

== Structure ==
The piece is written in the form of a suite with five movements:

1. Prélude: Moderato assai
2. Sérénade: Andantino
3. Scherzo: Allegro grazioso
4. Romance: Adagio
5. Finale: Allegro con brio

The end of the finale contains a recapitulation of the prelude, typical of a serenade. In fact, the work bears a close resemblance to Antonín Dvořák's String Serenade.

== Orchestrated version ==
Saint-Saëns' interest in this piece was revived in 1919. Cellist Joseph Hollmann, for whom the Second Cello Concerto was written, encouraged Saint-Saëns to orchestrate this suite of five pieces. However, the composer felt that the Scherzo and Finale were too pianistic to be orchestrated, and eventually came to a decision to replace the two movements with a Gavotte and a Tarantelle, respectively. The Gavotte, originally written in G minor, was transposed into D minor upon orchestration. The Romance already existed in orchestrated form because the composer once took the movement from the original suite and transcribed it for horn, for Henri Chaussier, though he modified it once again with different orchestration for the suite. The orchestrated version was published by J. Hamelle in 1920.

== Recordings ==
Cello and piano

- Roger Drinkall (cello) and Dian Baker (piano)
- Christoph Henkel (cello) and Hüseyin Sermet (piano)
- Maria Kliegel (cello) and François-Joël Thiollier (piano)
- Luigi Piovano (cello) and Luisa Prayer (piano)
- Lucia Swarts (cello) and Leo van Doeselaar (piano)

Cello and orchestra

- Steven Isserlis (cello) and Christoph Eschenbach conducting the NDR Symphony Orchestra)
- Maria Kliegel (cello) and Jean-François Monnard conducting the Bournemouth Sinfonietta
- Mischa Maisky (cello) and the Orpheus Chamber Orchestra
- Johannes Moser (cello) and Fabrice Bollon conducting the Stuttgart Radio Symphony Orchestra
- Christine Walevska (cello) and Eliahu Inbal conducting the Orchestra National de Monte-Carlo)

== See also ==
- List of compositions for cello and piano
