= Cello Concerto No. 1 (Haydn) =

Musical composition by Joseph Haydn

Cello Concerto
- No. 1
- Cello concerto by Joseph Haydn
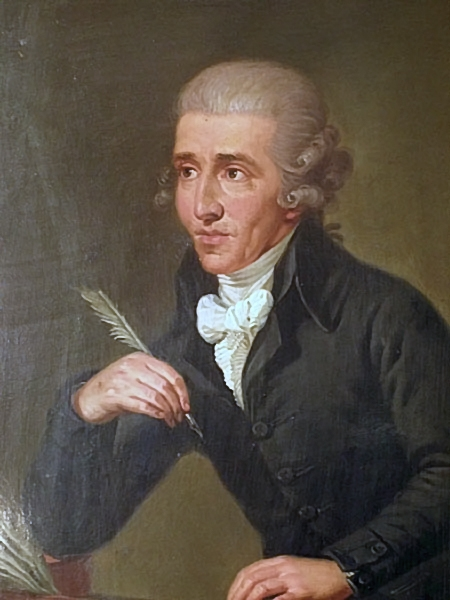
- Haydn c. 1770
- Key: C major
- Catalogue: Hob. VIIb/1
- Composed: c. 1765
- Movements: 3

The Cello Concerto No. 1 in C major, Hob. VIIb/1, by Joseph Haydn was composed around 1761–1765 for longtime friend Joseph Franz Weigl, then the principal cellist of Prince Nicolaus's Esterházy Orchestra.

The work was presumed lost until 1961, when musicologist Oldřich Pulkert discovered a copy of the score at the Prague National Museum. Though some doubts have been raised about the authenticity of the work, most experts believe that Haydn did compose this concerto.

== Background ==
Although the full work was discovered in 1961, Haydn had written the beginning of the principal theme of the first movement in his draft catalogue of 1765. This early work, nearly contemporaneous with Symphonies Nos. 6, 7 and 8 and predating his D major cello concerto by around twenty years, already shows Haydn as a master of instrumental writing. The solo cello part is thoroughly idiomatic. The concerto reflects the ritornello form of the baroque concerto as well as the emerging structure of the sonata-allegro form.

As in the baroque concerto grosso, the accompanying ensemble is small: strings, two oboes, and two horns. It is possible that Weigl was the only cellist in the Esterházy Orchestra when Haydn composed the concerto, since there is only one cello line in the score, marked alternately “solo” and “tutti.” There is also, however, a basso continuo line, that might have been played by another cellist, or by Haydn himself on the harpsichord, or by a string bass player.

== Movements ==
I. Moderato

II. Adagio

III. Allegro molto
Performed by the Metropolitan Chamber Orchestra (Sydney, Australia)

The concerto is in three movements:

1. Moderato
2. Adagio (F major)
3. Allegro molto

All three movements of this work are written in sonata form, unlike the second concerto, where rondo form is used in the second and third movements. This concerto is more related to Haydn's violin concerti than its follower, holding very close resemblance to the Violin Concerto no. 3 in A major, such as the first movement's etched rhythms, and flowing second themes, a peaceful slow movement, and a brisk finale. Both concerti were composed in the same period.

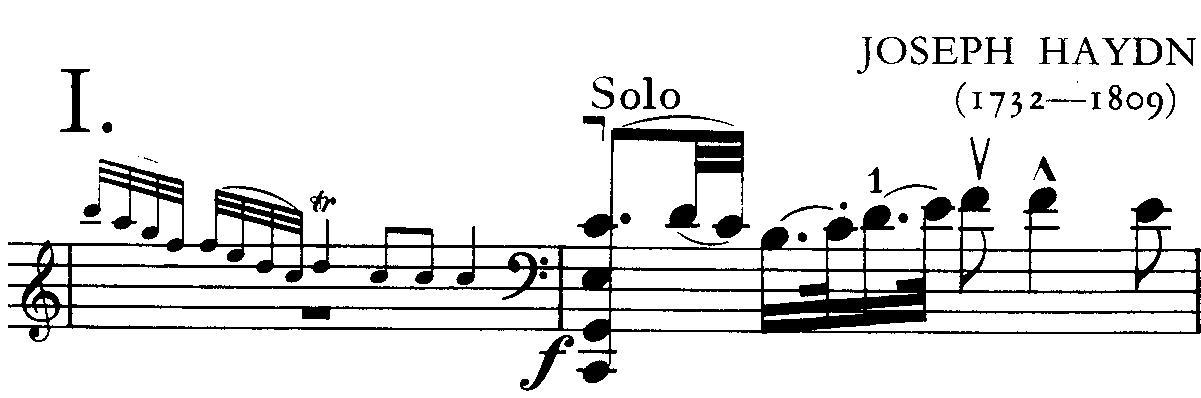
Entrance of solo cello

After the orchestral exposition of the first movement, the solo instrument plays the opening theme with full chords that use all four strings. Virtuosity is developed further in the use of rapidly repeating notes, the very high range, and quick contrasts of register. This movement is dominated by a single theme, although the theme itself includes several motives that Haydn develops separately. Near the end, a cadenza is played.

In the slow movement (scored without winds), the cello enters dramatically on a long note, played while the orchestral strings relaunch the opening theme. Two measures later the cello goes on to imitate this melody. Haydn was fond of this gesture: several times in the movement the cello enters on a sustained pitch. This movement, like the first, calls for a cadenza toward the end.

The finale also has the cello enter on a long note, after an extended orchestral introduction. This spirited finale, written in sonata allegro form, represented another chance for Haydn to show what he could do in spinning out a single theme into a series of short motives and a large variety of rapidly changing moods. The virtuosity of the solo instrument is exploited in this movement, especially in passages where the cello alternates rapidly from low to high, so that it seems to be two instruments playing in counterpoint. Haydn uses the sustained-note entrance several times, the final one on a very high, penetrating G.

== Influence ==
Haydn's C Major Cello Concerto has become a staple of the cello repertoire, after its 20th century premiere by Miloš Sádlo and the Czechoslovak Radio Symphony Orchestra, conducted by Sir Charles Mackerras, on 19 May 1962. Many famous artists, including Jacqueline du Pré, Yo-Yo Ma, Julian Lloyd Webber, Pierre Fournier, Truls Mørk, János Starker, Hidemi Suzuki, Anner Bylsma, Mstislav Rostropovich, Pieter Wispelwey, Heinrich Schiff, Lynn Harrell, Christine Walevska, Sol Gabetta, Maximilian Hornung, Mischa Maisky, Bruno Philippe, Steven Isserlis, Marie-Elisabeth Hecker, Maria Kliegel, Kian Soltani and Sergei Istomin have recorded it, as well as double bassist Bozo Paradzik.
