= Les Siècles =

French symphony orchestra

Les Siècles is a French symphony orchestra founded in 2003 by François-Xavier Roth, with ambition to put works from the 17th to 21st centuries into today's perspective. The musicians of the orchestra play each repertoire on the historical instruments appropriate to the time of its creation.

== History ==
Les Siècles perform regularly in Paris (Opéra Comique, Salle Pleyel, Théâtre du Châtelet, Philharmonie de Paris), in La Côte-Saint-André (Aisne department), in Aix-en-Provence, Metz, Caen, Nîmes, Royaumont and international stages, Amsterdam (Royal Concertgebouw), London (BBC Proms), Bremen, Brussels (Klara Festival), Wiesbaden, Luxembourg, Cologne, Tokyo, Essen.

In 2013, the orchestra received exclusive permission from the publisher Boosey & Hawkes to replay The Rite of Spring as it was heard at the Théâtre des Champs-Élysées on 29 May 1913. They have presented this version several times in concert in France and abroad. This concert series was also recorded with the 1911 version of Petrushka, for a record published by Éditions Musicales Actes Sud.

Their Stravinsky and Debussy records were voted Classical Record of the Year in The Sunday Times and Editor’s choice in the BBC Music Magazine & Gramophone. Their Stravinsky record won the prestigious Edison Klassiek Award 2012 in the Netherlands, as well as the Preis der deutschen Schallplattenkritik in Germany. Their recording Bizet-Chabrier was awarded a Diapason d'Or by the magazine of the same name and received five stars in the German magazine Fono Forum. Nine opuses have already been released on their label "Les Siècles Live" in co-publication with Musicales Actes Sud: Berlioz, Saint-Saëns, Matalon, The Firebird, The Rite of Spring and Petrushka by Igor Stravinsky, Liszt, Debussy, Dukas. Their recording of Ravel's ballet Daphnis et Chloé was issued by Harmonia Mundi in March 2017.

To share a passion for classical music, the musicians of the ensemble regularly offer educational activities in schools, hospitals, and prisons. The orchestra is also a partner of the Atelier symphonique départemental de l'Aisne du Jeune Orchestre européen Hector Berlioz and DEMOS (Dispositif d’Éducation musicale et orchestrale à vocation sociale) in Picardy.

== Discography ==
- Bizet / Chabrier (2007): Diapason d'Or and "Disc of the Week" (BBC and Classic FM), 5 stars (Magazine Fono Forum): Bizet's Symphony in C and Jeux d'enfants, Op.22, Chabrier's Suite pastorale.
- Chopin - Piano Concerto No. 1 and 2.
- Presto, dir. François-Xavier Roth, Mirare (2007)
- Bizet - Chabrier, dir. François-Xavier Roth, Mirare (2007) - Diapason Découverte
- Berlioz Symphonie fantastique, dir. François-Xavier Roth, Ed. Musicales Actes Sud, (2010)
- Saint-Saëns - Concerto pour piano n° 3 and Symphonie n°3 with organ, dir. François-Xavier Roth - Jean-François Heisser, piano - Daniel Roth, organ, Ed. Musicales Actes Sud, (2010)
- Matalon4 - Trames 2, 4 et 8, dir. François-Xavier Roth, Ed. Musicales Actes Sud, Harmonia Mundi (2011)
- Stravinsky - The Firebird (complete ballet 1910). First recording on period instruments - Ed. Musicales Actes Sud, (2011) - Preis der deutschen Schallplatten kritik, Edison Klassiek Prize 2012, Gramophone Choice
- Dubois - Concerto pour piano and Ouverture de Frithiof, Ed. Musicales Actes Sud, (2012)
- Liszt - Dante Symphony & Orpheus, Ed. Musicales Actes Sud, (2012)
- Debussy -La Mer & Première Suite d'Orchestre (world premiere), Ed. Musicales Actes Sud, (2013)
- Dukas - The Sorcerer's Apprentice / Cantate Velleda / Polyeucte, Ed. Musicales Actes Sud, (2013)
- Stravinsky - The Rite of Spring (recreation of the version played on May 29, 1913 / as heard at its 1913 premiere) / Petrushka (1911 version), Ed. Musicales Actes Sud, (2014)
- France - Espagne (Chabrier's España / Massenet's Le Cid - ballet / Ravel's Alborada del Gracioso/ Debussy, Iberia, Ed. Musicales Actes Sud, (2015)
- Ravel - Daphnis et Chloé, complete ballet, ed. Harmonia mundi (2017)
- Ravel - Ma mère l'Oye, Le Tombeau de Couperin, Shéhérazade (overture), Harmonia Mundi (2018)
- Fauré - Requiem version 1893, ed. Aparté (2019)
- Mahler - Titan, ed. Harmonia Mundi (2019)
- Berlioz - Symphonie Fantastique, ed. Harmonia Mundi (2019)
- Mussorgsky, orch. Ravel - Pictures at an Exhibition / Ravel - La Valse, Harmonia Mundi (2020)
- Saint-Saëns, Cello Concerto n°1 & n°2, Sol Gabetta, cello, Les Siècles, conductor François-Xavier Roth. Warner (2021)
- Ravel - Piano Concertos, Mélodies, Cédric Tiberghien (piano), Stéphane Degout (baritone), Harmonia Mundi (2022)
