= Patricia Blomfield Holt =

Canadian musician (1910–2003)

Patricia Blomfield Holt (15 September 1910 – 5 June 2003) was a Canadian composer, pianist and music educator. An associate of the Canadian Music Centre and a member of the Association of Canadian Women Composers, her compositions have been performed by notable musical ensembles throughout North America and Europe.

== Life ==
Born Patricia Blomfield in Lindsay, Ontario, Blomfield Holt began her career in her teenage years as a largely self-taught composer and pianist. She studied with Norah de Kresz privately before she entered The Royal Conservatory of Music at the age of 19 in 1928. She studied and taught concurrently for the next ten years. She was a pupil there of Norman Wilks, Hayunga Carman, Leo Smith, Ernest MacMillan and Healey Willan. She was a self-taught composer until she began studying with Willan in 1936.

In 1938 she won the Vogt Society Award for the best music composition for her Suite No. 1 for Violin and Piano. Her Suite No. 2 was described by London's Musical Times: "The language is frankly of the 19th century, and the forms are reminiscent of Schumann, but the material is handled with certainty and a nice sense of texture". After marrying in 1939, she subsequently turned down a scholarship to Juilliard. She also left her teaching position at The Royal Conservatory of Music and did not return until 1954. Blomfield Holt taught music history, music theory, composition and piano performance until she retired from the faculty in 1985.

== Musical style ==
Blomfield Holt's music has been described as "tonally conservative and well crafted". The majority of her output consists of chamber and vocal works. Her Lyric Piece No. 2 was recorded by Jeremy Findlay and Elena Braslavsky in 2002. Her orchestral work, Legend of the North Woods is "an evocation of a lake depicted in Canadian painter J.R. Seauvy’s picture of an unspoilt early Indian scene in the lake country" and was recorded by the University of Calgary Orchestra.

== Selected works ==
=== Incidental Music ===
- Sister Beatrice (1936)

=== Orchestral ===
- Pastorale (1940)
- Short Sketch on a Theme (1940)
- Legend of the North Woods (1985)
- To the Distant Shore (1988)

=== Chamber ===
- Pastorale and Finale, violin and piano (1935)
- Suite no.1, violin and piano (1936)
- Lyric Pieces nos.1-2, cello and piano (1937)
- String Quartet No. 1 (1937 rev 1939)
- Suite No. 2, violin or viola and piano (1939)
- String Quartet no. 2 (1956 rev 1985, 1987)
- Metamorphosis, viola and piano (1985)
- Set of Two, flute and piano (1987)
- Cello Sonata (1987)
- Invocations for flute, cello and harp (1989)

=== Vocal ===
- Songs of Early Canada for baritone, harp, horn, strings (1950)
- Songs of My Country for baritone or alto, harp, horn and strings with words by Duncan Campbell Scott, Susanna Moodie, Marjorie Pickthall (1950)
- 3 Songs of Contemplation for voice and piano with words by E. J. Pratt, M. Adeney, A. Lowell (1970)
- The Birds, voice and piano with words by Hilaire Belloc (1971)
- A Lake Memory for low voice and piano with words by William Wilfred Campbell (1979)
- Magnificat for SATB (1986)
- Polar Chrysalis: 10 Haiku Poems for mezzo-soprano, piano, horn, cello and percussion (1988)
- Who Knows Not Grief for SATB (1991)
- Let the Nations Rejoice for 9 voices (1995)

=== Piano ===
- Scherzo - Riding a Bicycle (1962)
- Two Piano Pieces (1974)
- Three Short Pieces (1974)
- Hardy's Ground (1982 rev 1995)
- Two Short Pieces (1999)
- Moments in Time (2002)
