= François-Xavier Roth =

French conductor (born 1971)

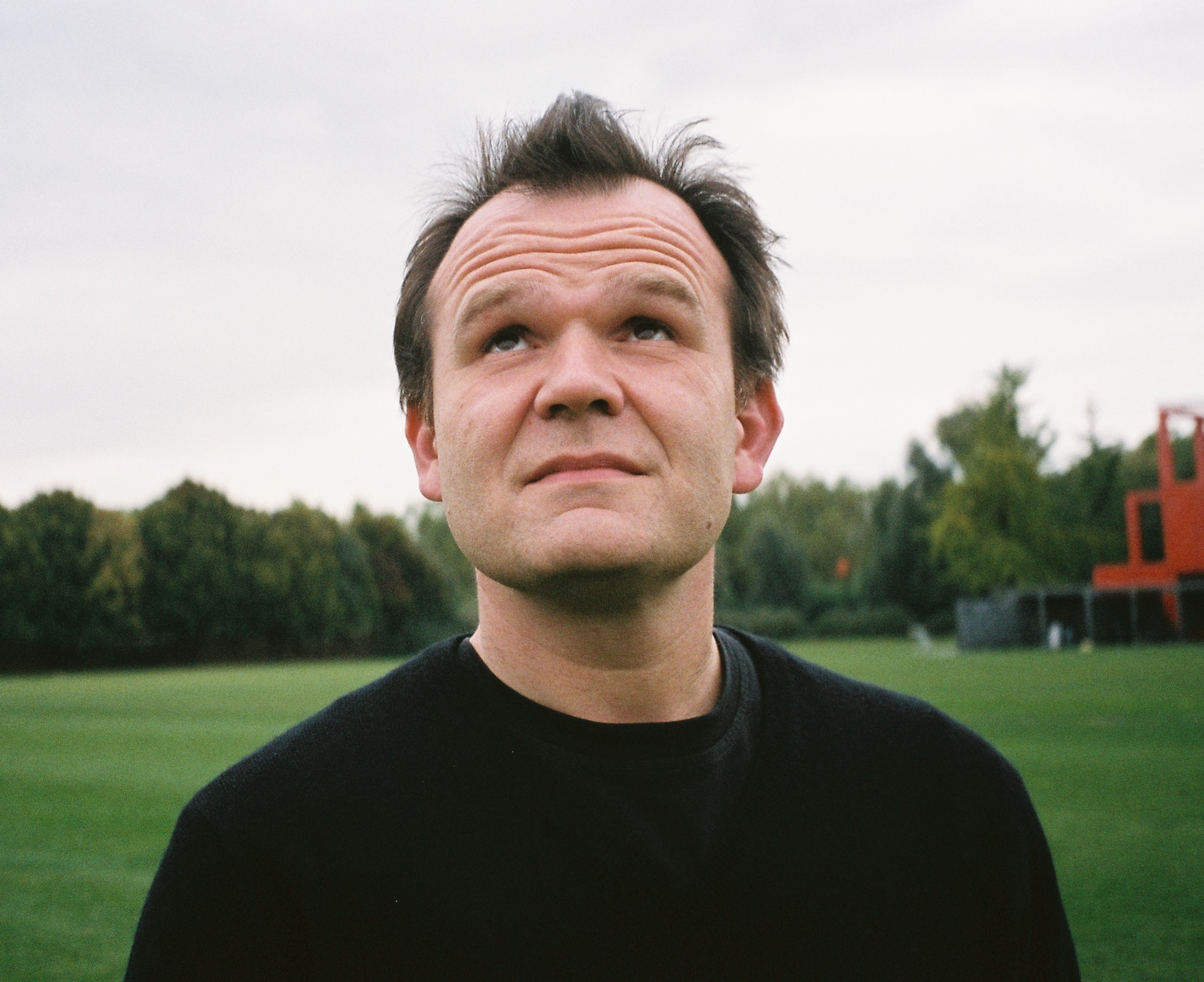
- Roth in 2009
- Born: 6 November 1971 (age 54); Neuilly-sur-Seine, France
- Occupations: Conductor; flautist
- Organizations: Les Siècles; SWR Sinfonieorchester Baden-Baden und Freiburg; Gürzenich Orchestra Cologne; SWR Symphonieorchester
- Parent: Daniel Roth
- Website: fxroth.com

François-Xavier Paul Roth (born 6 November 1971) is a French conductor.

== Biography ==
Roth is the son of the organist Daniel Roth—the two share the same first name. His brother Vincent is a violist. Before turning to conducting, he was a flautist. Roth graduated from the Conservatoire National Supérieur de Musique, where his teachers included Alain Marion for flute and János Fürst for conducting.

In 2000, Roth won the Donatella Flick Conducting Competition, which led to a 2-year appointment as assistant conductor of the London Symphony Orchestra. He has also served as an assistant conductor to John Eliot Gardiner. In 2003, he founded Les Siècles, an orchestra which performs on instruments appropriate to the period of composition of each piece, from late Baroque and Classical to 20th century music, such as Ravel. With Les Siècles, he has given concerts in France, Italy, Germany, England and Japan, appearing at the Proms in London. To mark the centenary of The Rite of Spring in 2013, the orchestra performed the work on period instruments at the BBC Proms and the Alte Oper, Frankfurt. Roth and Les Siècles have devised their own television series for France 2 entitled Presto!, which ran for three years and attracted audiences of over three million viewers. Roth has involved Les Siècles in community music initiatives, including sponsorship of orchestra and choir groups in the Société générale. With Les Siècles, Roth conducted the first revival of 100 years of Le Timbre d'argent.

Roth was Associate Guest Conductor of the BBC National Orchestra of Wales from 2008 to 2012. He was music director of the Orchestre Philharmonique de Liège (OPL) for the 2009–2010 season. In September 2011, Roth became principal conductor of the SWR Sinfonieorchester Baden-Baden und Freiburg. In February 2014, the orchestra announced the extension of Roth's SWR orchestra contract through the 2015–2016 season. In the same month, February 2014, the city of Cologne announced the appointment of Roth as its next Generalmusikdirektor (GMD), which includes duties as Gürzenich-Kapellmeister and chief conductor of the Cologne Opera, effective 1 September 2015, with an initial contract of 5 years. In October 2018, his contract with the Gürzenich Orchestra Cologne and the Cologne Opera was extended to 2022.

Roth was the last chief conductor of the SWR Sinfonieorchester Baden-Baden und Freiburg, before its merger with the SWR Sinfonieorchester Stuttgart to form the SWR Symphonieorchester. He conducted the final concert of the SWR Sinfonieorchester Baden-Baden und Freiburg on 17 July 2016 in Freiburg. In March 2017, the London Symphony Orchestra announced the appointment of Roth as its new principal guest conductor, effective September 2017.

In July 2020, Roth first guest-conducted the SWR Symphonieorchester. He returned to the orchestra for a subsequent guest-conducting engagement in June 2021. In September 2022, the SWR announced the appointment of Roth as the next chief conductor of the SWR Symphonieorchester, effective with the 2025–2026 season, with an initial contract of 5 years. In parallel with this announcement, the city of Cologne, also in September 2022, announced that Roth is to stand down as Gürzenich-Kapellmeister and chief conductor of the Cologne Opera at the close of the 2024–2025 season.

In May 2024, allegations of sexting and sexual harassment of musicians were made against Roth. The French magazine Le Canard enchaîné and the German online magazine VAN were the first to report on the allegations. Roth was replaced as conductor of a concert that evening by Les Siècles at the Théâtre des Champs-Élysées. In July 2024, the city of Cologne announced the close of Roth's tenure as Gürzenich-Kapellmeister and chief conductor of the Cologne Opera with immediate effect, one season earlier than the previously scheduled tenure conclusion, in light of these allegations.

Roth's son Félix Roth is a musician and French horn player. Roth was created a Chevalier of the Légion d'honneur in the Bastille Day Honours List 2017. In January 2018, Roth was nominated "Artiste associé" at the Philharmonie de Paris, which is also linked to his work with the children's orchestra Démos, an initiative based on the model of El Sistema.

== Selected discography ==
- Jean-Louis Agobet, Orchestre philharmonique de Strasbourg, Timpani Records, 2005
- Presto, Les Siècles, Mirare, 2007
- Bizet, Chabrier, Les Siècles, Mirare – Diapason Découverte, 2012
- Saint-Saëns – Chausson – Ysaÿe, Tedi Papavrami (violin), Orchestre Philharmonique de Liège, Aeon, 2009
- Thierry Pécou – La Symphonie du Jaguar, Orchestre Philharmonique de Radio France, Harmonia Mundi, 2009
- Berlioz – Symphonie fantastique, Les Siècles, «Les Siècles Live», Ed. Musicales Actes Sud, Distri. Harmonia Mundi, 2010
- Saint-Saëns – Piano Concerto No. 4 / Symphony No. 3; Jean-François Heisser, piano – Daniel Roth, organ – Les Siècles, "Les Siècles Live", Ed. Musicales Actes Sud, Distri. Harmonia Mundi, 2010
- Matalon – Trames 2, 4 et 8, dir. François-Xavier Roth, Les Siècles, «Les Siècles Live», Ed. Musicales Actes Sud, Distri. Harmonia Mundi, 2011
- Stravinsky – The Firebird (complete ballet), Les Siècles, « Les Siècles Live », Ed. Musicales Actes Sud, Distri. Harmonia Mundi, 2011 (Edison Klassiek Prize 2012)
- Mahler – Symphony No. 1 "Titan" / Webern – Im Sommerwind, SWR Sinfonieorchester Baden-Baden & Freiburg, Ed; Haenssler Classic, 2012
- Mahler – Symphony No. 5, – Gürzenich-Orchester Köln, Ed. Harmonia Mundi, 2017
- Dubois – "Concerto pour piano" et "Ouverture de Frithiof" – Les Siècles, «Les Siècles Live», Ed. Musicales Actes Sud, Distri. Harmonia Mundi, 2012
- Liszt – Dante Symphonie & Orpheus – Les Siècles, «Les Siècles Live», Ed. Musicales Actes Sud, Distri. Harmonia Mundi, 2012
- The Panufnik Legacies, London Symphony Orchestra, LSO Discovery, 2013
- Richard Strauss – Ein Heldenleben / Tod und Verklärung, SWR Sinfonieorchester Baden-Baden & Freiburg, Ed; Haenssler Classic, 2013
- Richard Strauss – Don Quixote / Till Eulenspiegel / Macbeth, SWR Sinfonieorchester Baden-Baden & Freiburg, Ed; Haenssler Classic, 2013
- Debussy – La Mer / Première Suite d'Orchestre (world premiere), Les Siècles, «Les Siècles Live », Ed. Musicales Actes Sud, Distri. Harmonia Mundi, 2013
- Dukas – L'Apprenti Sorcier / Cantate Velleda / Polyeucte, Les Siècles, «Les Siècles Live », Ed. Musicales Actes Sud, Distri. Harmonia Mundi, 2013
- Stravinsky – Le Sacre du Printemps (1913) & Petrouchka (1911), First recording on period instruments. Reconstructed version of Le Sacre du Printemps as heard on 29 May 1913, Les Siècles, «Les Siècles Live », Ed. Musicales Actes Sud, Distri. Harmonia Mundi, 2014 (Preis der deutschen Schallplatten kritik, Gramophone Choice)
- Richard Strauss – Also Sprach Zarathustra / Aus Italien, SWR Sinfonieorchester Baden-Baden & Freiburg, Ed; Haenssler Classic, 2015
- Richard Strauss – Eine Alpensinfonie / Don Juan, SWR Sinfonieorchester Baden-Baden & Freiburg, Ed; SWR Music, 2015
- France-Espagne – music by Chabrier, Massenet, Ravel, Debussy, Les Siècles, « Les Siècles Live » Ed. Musicales Actes Sud, Distri. Harmonia Mundi, 2015
- The Panufnik Legacies II, London Symphony Orchestra, LSO Discovery, 2016
- Ligeti – Kammerkonzert / Dix pièces pour quintette à vents / Six bagatelles, Winds of Les Siècles, « Les Siècles Live » Ed. Musicales Actes Sud, Distri. Harmonia Mundi, 2016
- Richard Strauss – Symphonia Domestica, Op. 53 / Metamorphosen, SWR Sinfonieorchester Baden-Baden & Freiburg, Ed; SWR Music, 2017
- Ravel – Daphnis et Chloé, Les Siècles, Ed. Harmonia Mundi, 2017
- Mirages – Sabine Devieilhe, Les Siècles, Ed. Warner Classics, 2017
- Bartok, Concertos for violin – Renaud Capuçon, London Symphony Orchestra, Ed. Warner Classics, 2018
- Ravel – Shéhérazade, ouverture de féérie, Le Tombeau de Couperin, Ma Mère L'Oye Les Siècles, Ed. Harmonia Mundi, 2018
- Berlioz – Harold en Italie, Les Nuits d'été, dir. François-Xavier Roth – Tabea Zimmermann, alto – Stéphane Degout, baryton – Les Siècles – [3] [archive] Harmonia Mundi (2019)
- Berlioz – La Damnation de Faust, Mathias Vidal (Faust), Anna Caterina Antonacci (Marguerite), Nicolas Courjal (Méphistophélès), Choeur Marguerite Louise, Les Siècles, 1 DVD Chateau de Versailles Spectacle 2019.
- The Young Debussy, dir. François-Xavier Roth – Edgar Moreau, violoncelle, London Symphony Orchestra – LSO DVD/Blu-Ray (2019)
- Camille Saint-Saëns, Cello Concerto n°1 & n°2, Sol Gabetta, cello, Les Siècles, conductor François-Xavier Roth. Warner (2021)

Cultural offices
Preceded by no predecessor	Artistic Director, Les Siècles; 2003–present	Succeeded by incumbent
Preceded by Sylvain Cambreling	Chief Conductor, SWR Sinfonieorchester Baden-Baden und Freiburg; 2011–2016	Succeeded by no successor (orchestra disbanded)
Preceded by Markus Stenz	Gürzenich-Kapellmeister and General Music Director, City of Cologne; 2015–2024	Succeeded by Andrés Orozco-Estrada
Preceded by Teodor Currentzis	Chief Conductor, SWR Symphonieorchester; 2025–present	Succeeded by incumbent
