= Cello Sonata No. 2 (Saint-Saëns) =

Sonata for piano and cello by Camille Saint-Saëns

- Cello sonata by Camille Saint-Saëns
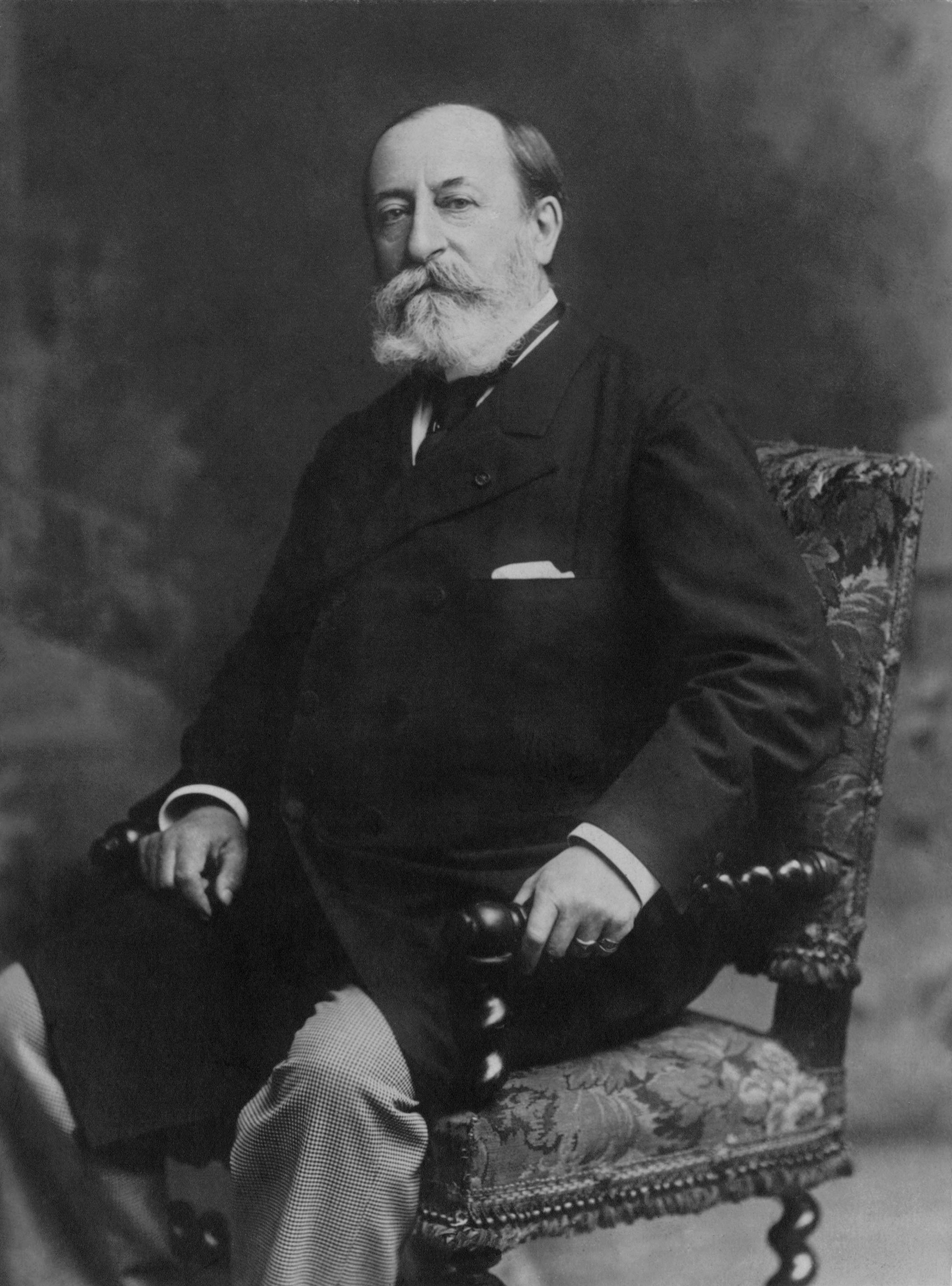
- Photo of Camille Saint-Saëns in 1900
- Key: F major
- Opus: 123
- Composed: March 1905
- Dedication: Jules Griset
- Published: July 1905 (Durand)
- Movements: four
- Scoring: cello; piano

Premiere
- Date: April 13, 1905 (private); October 27, 1905 (public)
- Location: Albert Blondel's home, Paris (private); Salle de la Société philharmonique, Niort (public)
- Performers: Joseph Hollmann; Camille Saint-Saëns; (private): Auguste Tolbecque; Aline Riffaud; (public)

The Cello Sonata No. 2 in F major, Op. 123, is a cello sonata by Camille Saint-Saëns. It was composed in 1905 during the composer's stay in Biskra, Algeria, and was written nearly 30 years after his first cello sonata. The sonata was dedicated to Jules Griset, a long-time friend of the composer, and was first performed privately by cellist Joseph Hollmann and Saint-Saëns himself before receiving its public premiere by Auguste Tolbecque and Aline Riffaud.

The work features contrasting themes, intricate interplay between the two instruments, and a range of expressive and technical demands. The first movement, Maestoso largamente, presents two distinct musical ideas, while the second movement, a Scherzo con variazioni, consists of eight variations on a lively theme. The third movement, a lyrical Romanza, focuses on the cello's expressive qualities, and the finale, Allegro non troppo grazioso, concludes the work with a graceful and playful dialogue between the instruments.

Despite Saint-Saëns's efforts to promote the sonata and its positive reception among critics and performers, it did not achieve the same level of popularity as his first cello sonata during his lifetime.

== History ==
Camille Saint-Saëns composed the sonata in March 1905 while staying in Biskra, Algeria, where he found ideal working conditions due to the quietness and mild weather. He had been reminded by his cellist friends and publisher Auguste Durand to write a second cello sonata, having composed his first, the Cello Sonata No. 1 in C minor, Op. 32, nearly 30 years earlier. On March 4, 1905, Saint-Saëns informed Durand that he had begun work on the new sonata. In subsequent letters, he described the work's concept and style, writing on March 16, "The Sonata is almost finished. I am in the finale which constitutes the fourth paw of the quadruped; the second is a Scherzo con Variazioni, the third a Romanza that will make the cellists happy." Two days later, he reported, "It is finally finished, this accursed sonata! Will it please or not? That is the question. It is rather difficult, but not unduly so."

The sonata was first performed privately on April 13, 1905, at the home of Albert Blondel, the director of the Érard piano factory, by cellist Joseph Hollmann and the composer himself. Saint-Saëns later recounted how, the day before the performance, Hollmann appeared to him, visibly distressed, and confessed that he had forgotten his score in a carriage. Saint-Saëns, undeterred by the predicament, offered to rewrite the entire sonata, and spent part of the night and the following day on the task, and the performance took place as scheduled. Saint-Saëns reflected that the unfortunate incident had a positive outcome, as the new copy, although created under time pressure, turned out to be superior to the original.

The public premiere was given by Auguste Tolbecque and pianist Aline Riffaud on October 27, 1905, in Niort, before the dedicatee, Jules Griset, performed it with Saint-Saëns in Paris on November 7. Griset was a long-time friend of Saint-Saëns who owned a private theatre and occasionally played the piano accompaniment at the musical society La Trompette. Griset expressed his gratitude for the dedication in a letter dated September 3, 1905: "Yesterday, your publisher sent me your – oh, what am I saying – my Sonata. [...] It is superb, full of poetry and delectable surprises, and I thank you for the great honour that you have bestowed upon my humble self by placing my name above it."

The work was published by Durand in July 1905. Saint-Saëns continued to promote the sonata, performing it with various cellists during his concert tours. In a letter to Jacques Durand on July 13, 1906, he wrote, "Enormous success yesterday at Hollmann's concert. The first appearance of the new sonata could not have been better received; Hollmann played it admirably as well as the [First Sonata], where I finally heard the phrase of the finale rendered as it should be. [...] Decidedly, if there is no mistake, the Second [Sonata] is very superior to the first."

== Structure ==
External audio
- Performed by Steven Isserlis and Pascal Devoyon
- I. Maestoso, largamente
- II. Scherzo con variazioni
- III. Romanza
- IV. Allegro non troppo grazioso

The sonata consists of four movements:

1. Maestoso, largamente
2. Scherzo con variazioni
3. Romanza
4. Allegro non troppo grazioso

The first movement, marked Maestoso largamente, presents two contrasting themes: one energetic and bustling, characterized by a specific rhythmic pattern, and the other playfully flippant. A serene theme introduces a sense of tranquility to the dialogue between the two instruments, with the development of the material following classical lines.

The second movement, titled Scherzo con variazioni and marked Allegro animato, is a set of eight variations on a lively theme initially stated by the piano in unison octaves. Saint-Saëns, in a letter to his publisher, mentioned that he did not follow the trend of making the variations vastly different from the theme, but still ensured they were sufficiently contrasting, even including a fugue.

The third movement, a Romanza marked Poco adagio e molto espressivo, features melodious and expressive writing for the cello, accompanied primarily by broken chords and arpeggios in the piano. Saint-Saëns described this movement as one that "will bring tears to the eyes of sensitive souls."

The finale, marked Allegro non troppo grazioso, is characterized by its graceful and flowing nature. Saint-Saëns humorously noted that this movement "will awaken those who have been put to sleep by the other movements." A charming cantabile theme is prominently featured and developed throughout the movement. The sonata concludes with a harmonious and amiable resolution, reminiscent of a conversation that began with some disagreement but ends with tender reminiscences of past happiness.

== Reception ==
The sonata received positive reviews following its premiere. The critic from Le Ménestrel wrote of the work, "The work, which deserves a lengthy analysis, is one of his most beautiful productions. The themes are of a rare freshness and originality, and the developments dazzling." However, despite Saint-Saëns's efforts to promote the sonata through his concert tours and reports of enthusiastic responses from audiences and critics, it did not achieve the same level of success as his first cello sonata. This may be attributed to a general preference for his earlier works from the 1870s and 1880s, which were favored even during the composer's lifetime. Additionally, the technical demands placed on the performers in the second sonata, despite its abundance of rhythmic and harmonic refinements, may have contributed to its lesser popularity compared to the first sonata. Saint-Saëns himself acknowledged this in a letter to his publisher on March 16, 1905, stating, "Naturally the Second Sonata will not be worth the first; when La Fontaine published his second collection of fables, everyone by common agreement declared it inferior to the first. One must resign oneself to the inevitable."

Despite these factors, the sonata was appreciated by those who performed it. Cellist Pierre Destombes, who played the work with Saint-Saëns on April 27, 1908, at Salle Pleyel, was praised by the composer in a letter to Jacques Durand on December 27, 1912: "Destombes plays the Romance of my Second Sonata as one dreams of hearing it. The sound, the charm, the style, it is ideal." Watson Lyle described the sonata as "an elaborate and musicianly brilliant, rather than an emotionally intense, work. It demands technique of a high grade from both performers, throughout."
