= Sol Gabetta =

Argentine cellist (born 1981)

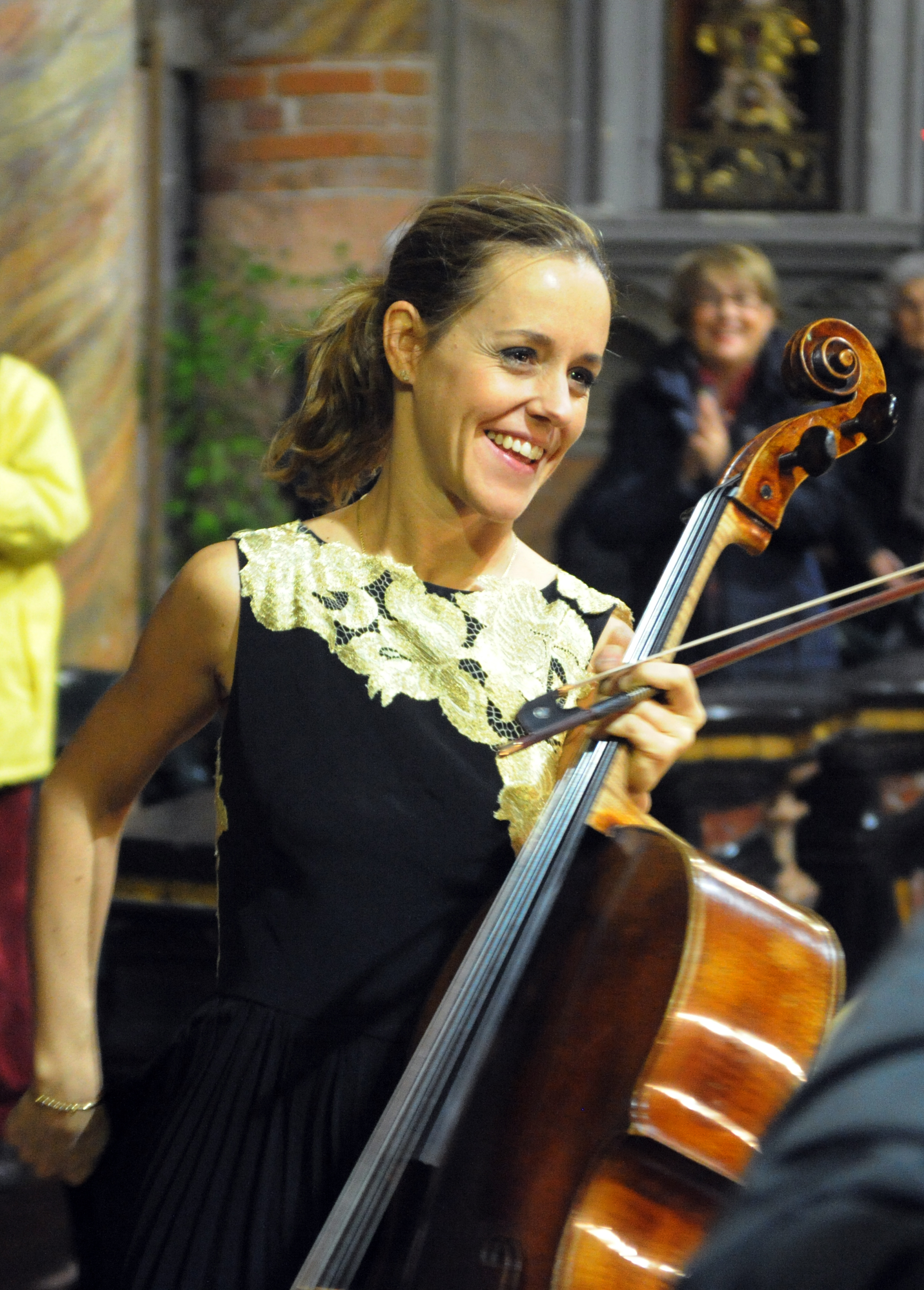
- Sol Gabetta in 2014
- Born: 18 April 1981 (age 45); Villa María, Córdoba, Argentina
- Education: Reina Sofía School of Music; Hochschule für Musik Hanns Eisler Berlin
- Occupation: Classical cellist
- Awards: Gramophone Award
- Website: www.solgabetta.com

Sol Gabetta (born 18 April 1981) is an award-winning Argentina-born cellist who made an international career as both a soloist, and a chamber musician.

== Early life and education ==
Gabetta was born on 18 April 1981 in Villa María, Córdoba, Argentina. She is the daughter of pianist Irène Timacheff, and Andrés Gabetta, and is descended from Russian and French stock on her mother's side, and Argentine and Italian on her father's. She is the youngest of four children.

Gabetta grew up playing violin and clarinet (and had a further interest in harp, that was stymied by her father for practical reasons)—she began on the violin at the age of three, and on cello at age four. She continued to study both instruments until age eight, and then switched her focus exclusively to the cello.

Her debut performance was at the "legendary" Teatro Colón de Buenos Aires at age 12 (she had won her first competition at age 10), these soon followed by the Natalia Gutman Award. An early cello teacher of Gabetta was Christine Walevska.

In addition to Walevska, Gabetta's teachers have included Leo Viola, and Ivan Monighetti at the Reina Sofía School of Music, where she graduated in 1999 with distinction. She studied further at the Hochschule für Musik Hanns Eisler Berlin with David Geringas, completing in 2006 with the comcert exam. She also studied with Piero Farulli, and Ljerko Spiller.

== Career ==
Gabetta's win, at age 23, of the Crédit Suisse Young Artist Award was announced in January 2004. She has been teaching cello at the Basel Music Academy since 2005. In 2006, she founded her own festival, the Festival Solsberg.

Her debut with the Berlin Philharmonic and Sir Simon Rattle was at the Baden-Baden Easter Festival in 2014. Her debut with the Staatskapelle Berlin occurred in December 2014. She was Artist in Residence at the Schleswig-Holstein Musik Festival in summer 2014, and also held artistic residencies at the Philharmonie and Konzerthaus Berlin.

Supported by a private stipend from the Rahn Kulturfonds since this date, Gabetta performs on a cello by G. B. Guadagnini dating from 1759. Gabetta has made commercial recordings for Sony and Deutsche Grammophon.

Gabetta featured as soloist in the opening concert of the BBC Promenade concerts 2016 season, playing Elgar’s Cello Concerto. In August 2024, Gabetta performed the UK premiere of Francisco Coll’s Cello Concerto with the BBC Symphony Orchestra, conducted by Tianyi Lu, at the BBC Proms.

Contemporary composers who have written music for Gabetta include Michel van der Aa, who composed Up-close for Gabetta and the Amsterdam Sinfonietta, and Pēteris Vasks, who wrote his cello concerto 'Presence' for Gabetta. In November 2015, Gabetta's album of the music of Vasks, Presence, was released, which includes the cello concerto 'Presence', and "Musique du Soir" for organ and cello, in which Sol Gabetta and her mother, a professional organist, perform together.

=== Other activities ===
Since this date, Gabetta has been a regular presenter for the programme KlickKlack, for Bavarian Radio (BR-Klassik).

== Awards and recognition ==
In addition to her early Crédit Suisse Young Artist award, other of her prizes have included the Gramophone Award for Young Artist of the Year in 2010, and the Würth Prize of Jeunesses Musicales Germany in 2012. At the Echo Klassik Awards, she was recognized in 2007, 2009 and 2013, and as Instrumentalist of the Year in 2013. She received the Diapason d'Or for her recordings of Haydn, Mozart and Elgar cello concerti, as well as works by Tchaikovsky and Ginastera.

Gabetta was awarded the Herbert von Karajan Prize at the Salzburg Easter Festival in 2018.

== Discography ==
- Tchaikovsky, Saint-Saëns and Ginastera – with Munich Radio Orchestra (Sony Classical, 2006)
- Il Progetto Vivaldi – with Sonatori de la Gioiosa Marca (Sony Classical, 2007)
- Cantabile – with Prague Philharmonic (Sony Classical, 2008)
- Shostakovich Concerto No. 2 – with Munich Philharmonic (Sony Classical, 2008)
- Haydn / Hofmann / Mozart: Cello Concertos – with Kammerorchester Basel (Sony Classical, 2009)
- Elgar: Cello Concerto / Dvořák – with Danish National Symphony Orchestra (Sony Classical, 2010)
- Pēteris Vasks: Gramata Cellam – The Book for Solo Cello (Sony Classical, 2010)
- Shostakovich Concerto No. 1 – with Munich Philharmonic and Lorin Maazel (Sony Classical, 2012)
- Duo – with Hélène Grimaud (Deutsche Grammophon, 2012)
- Il Progetto Vivaldi II (Sony Classical, 2012)
- Il Progetto Vivaldi III (Sony Classical, 2013)
- Prayer (Sony Classical, 2014)
- The Chopin Album – with Bertrand Chamayou (Sony Classical, 2015)
- Beethoven Triple Concerto – with Kammerorchester Basel (Sony Classical, 2015)
- Vasks – Presence – with the Amsterdam Sinfonietta (Sony Classical, 2015)
- Elgar: Cello Concerto / Martinů: Cello Concerto No.1 – with Berlin Philharmonic (Sony Classical, 2016)
- Dolce Duello: Cecilia & Sol – with Cecilia Bartoli (Decca Classics, 2017)
- Schumann – (Sony Classical, 2018)
- Camille Saint-Saëns, Cello Concerto n°1 & n°2, Sol Gabetta, cello, Les Siècles, conductor François-Xavier Roth. (Warner, 2021)
- Plaisirs illumines – Sol Gabetta with Patricia Kopatchinskaja and Camerata Bern (Sony Classical, 2021)
- Sol & Pat – Sol Gabetta with Patricia Kopatchinskaja and Camerata Bern (Sony Classical, 2021)
- Mendelssohn - Sol Gabetta with Bertrand Chamayou (Sony Classical, 2024)
- Lise Cristiani - Sol Gabetta (Sony Classical, 2025)

== Films ==
- Sol Gabetta joue Haydn et Vasks. ZDF 2009. Producers: David Stevens, Gösta Courkamp. Performed at the Solsberg Festival. Haydn's Concerto and Dolcissimo (2nd movement of Gramata Cellam; The book) by Vasks.
- Sol Gabetta, A Part of My Soul: Portrait of the cellist Sol Gabetta. 2013. Written by Annette Schreier. Producers: NDR / Screen Land Film

== Personal life ==
Gabetta married Balthazar Soulier, and as of this date, they had one child, a son. They reside in Switzerland.

Gabetta speaks six languages—Spanish, French, Russian, Italian, German, and English.

Gabetta's older brother Andrés is a professional violinist.
