= Op. 123 =

In music, Op. 123 stands for Opus number 123. Compositions that are assigned this number include:

- Beethoven – Missa solemnis
- Ries – Piano Concerto No. 6
- Saint-Saëns – Cello Sonata No. 2
- Schumann – Festival overture on the Rheinweinlied for orchestra and chorus
