= Cello Sonata No. 1 (Saint-Saëns) =

Sonata for piano and cello by Camille Saint-Saëns

- Cello sonata by Camille Saint-Saëns
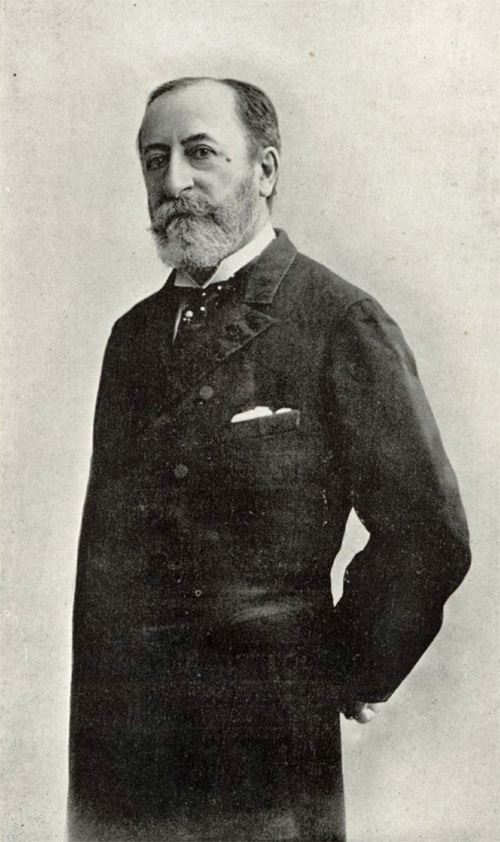
- Saint-Saëns c. 1880
- Key: C minor
- Opus: 32
- Composed: October 1872
- Dedication: Jules Lasserre
- Published: May 1873 (Durand)
- Movements: Three
- Scoring: cello; piano

Premiere
- Date: 7 December 1872
- Location: Société nationale de musique, Paris
- Performers: Auguste Tolbecque; Camille Saint-Saëns

The Cello Sonata No. 1 in C minor, Op. 32, is a cello sonata composed by Camille Saint-Saëns in 1872. Dedicated to the French cellist Jules Lasserre, the sonata was premiered on 7 December 1872 at the Société nationale de musique in Paris, with Auguste Tolbecque on cello and the composer at the piano.

The work is composed of three movements: Allegro, Andante tranquillo sostenuto, and Allegro moderato. Known for its dramatic character and emotional depth, the sonata is often interpreted as a reflection of the composer's personal struggles and the historical events of the time, such as the Franco-Prussian War and the Paris Commune. The demanding and highly virtuosic writing for both instruments quickly earned the sonata a place in the concert repertoire, with numerous notable performances in the years following its premiere.

Stylistically, the sonata is reminiscent of Beethoven's music, particularly in its thematic construction and interconnection, as well as its choice of the key C minor. However, the work stands out among Saint-Saëns's chamber music output for its excitingly dramatic and unusual character, lacking the audience-pleasing traits often found in his other compositions.

== History ==
The Cello Sonata No. 1 was composed around the turn of the year 1872/73, along with several other important works for violoncello, including the Cello Concerto No. 1 in A minor, Op. 33 and the Allegro appassionato in B minor, Op. 43 for cello and piano. Saint-Saëns likely drew inspiration for these works from his musician friends, as they are dedicated to well-known French cellists of the day with whom the composer often performed, such as Auguste Tolbecque and Jules Lasserre. The work's bleak undertone is often interpreted as a reflection of the tumultuous events surrounding its composition, including the war recently lost against Germany, the subsequent turmoil of the Paris Commune, and Saint-Saëns's personal grief over the loss of his beloved great-aunt Charlotte Masson, who died in February 1872.

The Cello Sonata was completed in October 1872, and according to the recollections of Charles-Marie Widor, it had its first performance at one of Saint-Saëns's famous Monday soirées in Paris, where "the listeners were thrilled, save for Clémence Saint-Saëns, the composer's mother, who branded the finale as 'worthless.'"

However, the composer was not satisfied with the original finale and wrote a new closing movement dated 31 December 1872. Saint-Saëns later wrote to his friend Charles Lecocq: "When I wrote my sonata for piano and violoncello, the finale was just not up to scratch. So I had to put it back in the drawer for quite a while until I was able to write another one very different from the first." The first and last pages of the Andante movement reproduce textually the music of an improvisation played by Saint-Saëns the previous year on the organ of Saint-Augustin.

The definitive version of the Sonata, with the new finale, was premiered on 7 December 1872 at the Société nationale de musique, played by Auguste Tolbecque and Saint-Saëns. The work was published by Durand in May 1873 and was dedicated to Jules Lasserre, a violoncello virtuoso with whom Saint-Saëns often performed chamber music. The Cello Sonata quickly made its way into the concert repertoire and was recognized for its demanding and often highly virtuosic writing.

== Structure ==
The cello sonata is composed of three movements:

1. Allegro
2. Andante tranquillo sostenuto
3. Allegro moderato

The first movement opens with a dramatic and anguished introduction, reminiscent of the opening chords of Chopin's Piano Sonata No. 2, Op. 35. The piano is occupied with rapid semiquaver passages in scales and arpeggios, against a broad melody in the cello. A period of calm in the tonic major is brief, as the development section becomes increasingly stressful, with only short, calm passages in the piano serving to heighten the poignancy of the emotion.

The second movement, Andante tranquillo sostenuto, features a lovely melody in the cello, accompanied by chorale-like clarity in the piano harmonies. The melody is then elaborated and varied in its presentation, creating an atmosphere of "ineffable calm, that is half languor, half resignation, which may come to the solace of emotions overwrought by a very desolation of grief."

The final movement, Allegro moderato, is characterized by a mood of passionate defiance, signifying renewed strength and courage. The opening theme, accompanied by agitated semiquavers in the piano, serves as an indicator of the dominant emotional condition. Both instruments are given brilliant writing throughout the movement. Saint-Saëns borrowed the primary theme of this definitive final movement from an unpublished Prélude for piano solo, which he had written in 1866.

The overall style of thematic construction and interconnection in the Sonata is reminiscent of Beethoven's music, an impression further reinforced by the choice of the key C minor, often associated with Beethoven's works. Despite this, the Sonata lacks the audience-pleasing traits found in many of Saint-Saëns's other chamber works, instead presenting a more excitingly dramatic and unusual character for the French composer.

== Reception ==
The Cello Sonata was well received by audiences and critics, who quickly recognized the stature of the demanding and often highly virtuosic work. The Sonata made its way into the concert repertoire, with numerous performances by notable cellists and pianists in the years following its premiere. Jules Lasserre, the work's dedicatee, performed the Sonata with Saint-Saëns in London on 6 July 1876, and later with Hans von Bülow on 18 June 1878 at the Musical Union.

The Sonata's emotional depth and dramatic character were also noted by critics and biographers. Watson Lyle wrote that "the dramatic opening of this impressive sonata, indeed the emotions expressed during the whole of the composition, are surely influenced by the trials through which Saint-Saëns had just passed, from which, in fact, he was hardly free, at the time of its conception." Gabriel Fauré called it the only cello sonata from any country to be of any importance.

Émile Baumann wrote of the piece:

When I was thirteen, I heard my father and cousin Émilie Lucas play the Cello Sonata in C minor. It was an unforgettable shock. [...]

The Sonata exalted my innate sense of the tragic. [...] In the themes and momentum of the Sonata, I perceived, obscurely, a state of mind that corresponded to my own. The Andante, with its liturgical calm, transported me beneath the naves of the nearby cathedral, that cathedral of Saint-Jean where I could never revisit without recognizing the architecture and color of my secret life.

Finally, I found in the last movement a wild, nostalgic surge; my appetites for independence and limitless happiness were swept away on this torrent. I gazed, while listening, at a canvas by Isidore Flachéron depicting the inner courtyard of a mosque in Algiers. I saw tombs, a minaret, women in white, veiled, and an old date palm, bent by its tall stature, against the cerulean sky – a sky like the one I had never suspected existed in Lyon.

— Émile Baumann
