= Southwest German Radio Symphony Orchestra =

- Orchestra
- Official logo
- Native name: Sinfonieorchester des Südwestrundfunks
- Founded: 1946; 80 years ago
- Disbanded: 2016; 10 years ago
- Later name: SWR Symphonieorchester
- Location: Baden-Baden and Freiburg, Germany

The Southwest German Radio Symphony Orchestra (also known in English as the SWR Baden-Baden Freiburg Symphony Orchestra and in German as the Sinfonieorchester des Südwestrundfunks) was a German radio orchestra located in the German cities of Baden-Baden and Freiburg.

== History ==
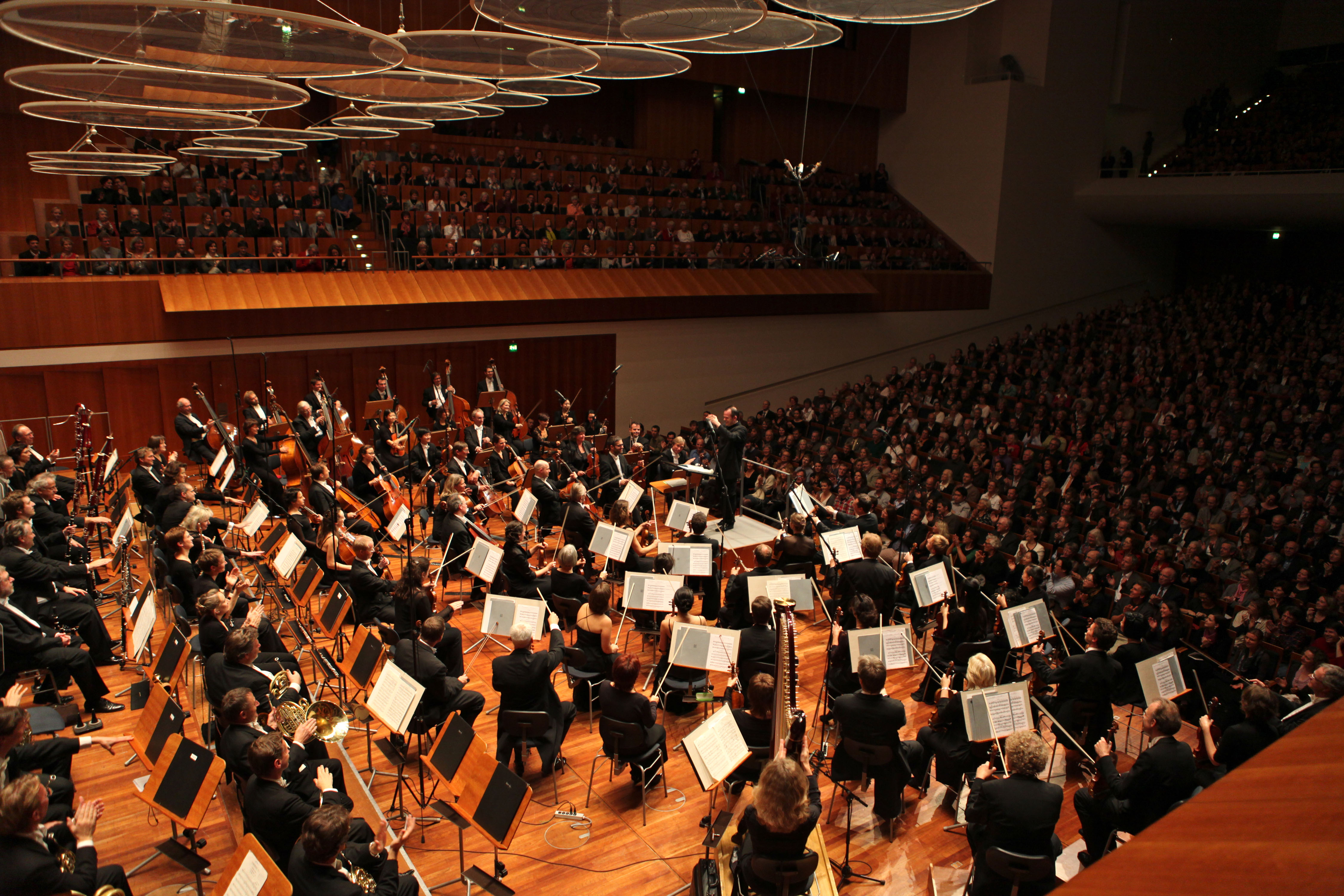
Southwest German Radio Symphony Orchestra, chief conductor François-Xavier Roth

The first incarnation of the orchestra occurred in 1946, initially with members of the discontinued spa orchestra of the city as the core of players. The revival of the spa orchestra two years later forced the reorganization of the radio orchestra. Subsequently, Hans Rosbaud was hired as the orchestra's first chief conductor. Rosbaud was already well known as a champion of modern music, and Heinrich Strobel, the music director in charge of the orchestra, shared this sympathy with contemporary music. Thus the orchestra had as its focus performances of modern music.

The orchestra was first sponsored by Südwestfunk (SWF), a public broadcasting corporation headquartered in Baden-Baden. In 1998 SWF merged into Südwestrundfunk ("Southwest Broadcasting"), which took over responsibility for the orchestra. The orchestra's final chief conductor was François-Xavier Roth, from 2011 to 2016. Michael Gielen, chief conductor from 1986 to 1999, had the title of Ehrendirigent (conductor laureate) with the orchestra.

In June 2012, the SWR Broadcasting Council voted to approve a measure proposed by SWR Intendant Peter Boudgoust to merge the Southwest German Radio Symphony Orchestra with the Stuttgart Radio Symphony Orchestra, for ostensible reasons of budgetary limitations for two separate orchestras affiliated with the SWR. The SWR Broadcasting Council formally passed the measure in September 2012, with the merger of the two orchestras scheduled to occur in 2016. Protests at the decision resulted. The orchestra made its first, and only, appearance at The Proms on 26 August 2015. The orchestra gave its final concert, under the direction of François-Xavier Roth, on 17 July 2016 in Freiburg. The name of the new orchestra is SWR Symphonieorchester.

One of the most widely heard recordings by this orchestra was Ligeti's Atmospheres conducted by Ernest Bour on the 2001: A Space Odyssey soundtrack. The orchestra has also recorded commercially for the Hänssler label, including music of Messiaen, Bartók, Stravinsky, Schoenberg, and Wolfgang Rihm.

== Chief conductors ==
- Hans Rosbaud (1948–1962)
- Ernest Bour (1964–1979)
- Kazimierz Kord (1980–1986)
- Klaus Arp (1987–1995)
- Michael Gielen (1986–1999)
- Sylvain Cambreling (1999–2011)
- François-Xavier Roth (2011–2016)
