= Elena Braslavsky =

American pianist of Russian birth

- Born: Moscow, USSR
- Instrument: Piano
- Member of: Flatiron Trio, Ensemble Salzburg
- Website: https://www.braslavsky-findlay.com/elena/index.html

Elena Braslavsky is a pianist of Russian birth. Since the early 1980s, Braslavsky has had an active international performance career in both the concert and chamber music repertoire. Formerly a faculty member at the Juilliard School and the Mannes School of Music, Braslavsky currently serves on the piano faculty of the Mozarteum University of Salzburg.

== Early life and education ==
Braslavsky began studying the piano in Moscow (then part of the Soviet Union) when she was five years old. She graduated from the Gnessin School of Music in 1979 and studied under Irina Sekt. She later pursued studies at the Juilliard School with Leonard Eisner, Nadia Reisenberg, and Oxana Yablonskaya, earning a Doctor of Music from Juilliard in 1991. As a DAAD and Fulbright Scholar, she studied at the Hochschule für Musik Köln and at the European Mozart Academy.

== Career ==
Braslavsky has appeared as a soloist with numerous orchestras, including the Berlin Philharmonic, the New Jersey Symphony, the Salzburg Chamber Soloists, the Cracow Philharmonic, the Warsaw Camerata, and the North Czech Philharmonic among others. As a recitalist and chamber musician she has performed at the Aix-en-Provence Festival, the Théâtre des Champs Elysées in Paris, the Konzerthaus Berlin, and Alice Tully Hall in New York City's Lincoln Center among others. In addition to the piano, Braslavsky is known to play the harpsichord.

She often plays with cellist Jeremy Findlay with whom she has actively performed and recorded works since 1994. Czech composer Jiří Gemrot has written numerous pieces for the couple, including the Double Concerto for Cello, Piano and Orchestra which they performed in its premiere at the Rudolfinum in Prague with the Prague Philharmonia. She currently resides in New York with her daughter Alyssa.

In 1995, with Findlay and violinist Nurit Pacht, the trio co-founded the Flatiron Trio in Krakow. The Flatiron Trio is focused on music education. As of 2005, Braslavsky is also a member and founder of Ensemble Salzburg with Risa Schuchter, Bernhard Krabatsch and Findlay.
