= SWR Symphonieorchester =

German symphony orchestra

SWR Symphony Orchestra
- Radio orchestra
- Native name: SWR Symphonieorchester
- Former name: Stuttgart Radio Symphony Orchestra (1945); Southwest German Radio Symphony Orchestra (1946)
- Founded: 2016; 10 years ago
- Location: Stuttgart, Germany
- Concert hall: Various (see below)
- Principal conductor: François-Xavier Roth
- Website: Official website

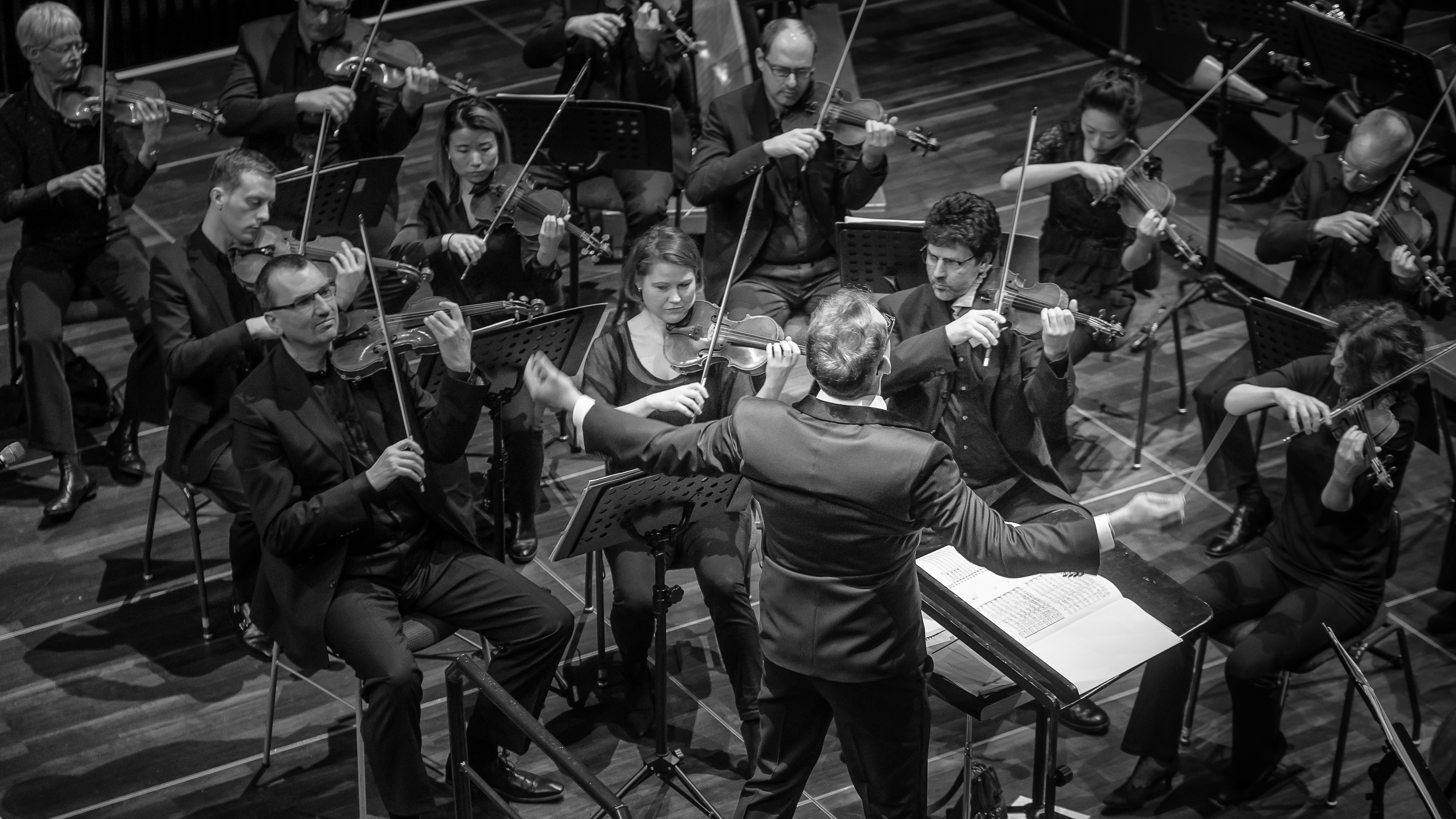
SWR Symphonieorchester at Strawinsky Saal in Donaueschingen 2018

The SWR Symphonieorchester (SWR Symphony Orchestra) is a radio orchestra affiliated with the Südwestrundfunk (Southwest German Radio) public broadcasting network. Formed in 2016, the orchestra is administratively based in Stuttgart. The current orchestra manager is Sabrina Haane, and the current director of artistic planning is Henning Bey.

The orchestra's first chief conductor was Teodor Currentzis. François-Xavier Roth is the orchestra's chief conductor-designate.

== History ==
The two precursor ensembles to the SWR Symphonieorchester were the Stuttgart Radio Symphony Orchestra and the Southwest German Radio Symphony Orchestra, the latter based in Baden-Baden and Freiburg. The Southwest German Radio Symphony Orchestra, in particular, had a specific reputation for its performances of contemporary music. In June 2012, the SWR Broadcasting Council voted to approve a measure proposed by SWR Intendant Peter Boudgoust to merge the two orchestras, for ostensible reasons of budgetary limitations for two separate orchestras affiliated with the SWR. The SWR Broadcasting Council formally passed the measure in September 2012, with the merger of the two orchestras scheduled for 2016.

The formation of the new orchestra, under the new name of the SWR Symphonieorchester, produced an ensemble in 2016 with a complement of 175 musicians drawn from the two previous orchestras. The eventual goal is to attain a roster of 119 musicians. The new orchestra gave its first concert on 22 September 2016 in Stuttgart at the Liederhalle, under the direction of Péter Eötvös.

The orchestra did not have a chief conductor at the time of its founding. Sylvain Cambreling had been offered the post of chief conductor of the new orchestra, but declined on principle, in protest at the merger of the two precursor orchestras into the new ensemble. In April 2017, the SWR announced the appointment of Teodor Currentzis as the first chief conductor of the orchestra, effective with the 2018–2019 season. In September 2021, the SWR announced a 3-year extension to Currentzis' contract as chief conductor of the orchestra until 2025. Currentzis, who was scheduled to stand down as the orchestra's chief conductor at the close of the 2024–2025 season, left in June 2024.

In July 2020, François-Xavier Roth first guest-conducted the orchestra. He returned to the orchestra for a subsequent guest-conducting engagement in June 2021. In September 2022, the SWR announced the appointment of Roth as the orchestra's next chief conductor, effective with the 2025–2026 season, with an initial contract of 5 years. Following an investigation into Roth's past behaviour with respect to SWR ensembles, in light of separate allegations of sexting and inappropriate conduct by Roth at other institutions, the SWR affirmed its appointment of Roth to the orchestra in July 2024.

== Chief conductors ==
- Teodor Currentzis (2018–2024)
- François-Xavier Roth (2025–present)

== Venues ==
The SWR Symphonieorchester gives concerts in several German cities and concert halls. Its principal cities and concert venues are as follows:

- Stuttgart (Liederhalle; Theaterhaus; Wilhelmatheater)
- Freiburg im Breisgau (Konzerthaus, E-Werk)
- Mannheim (Rosengarten)
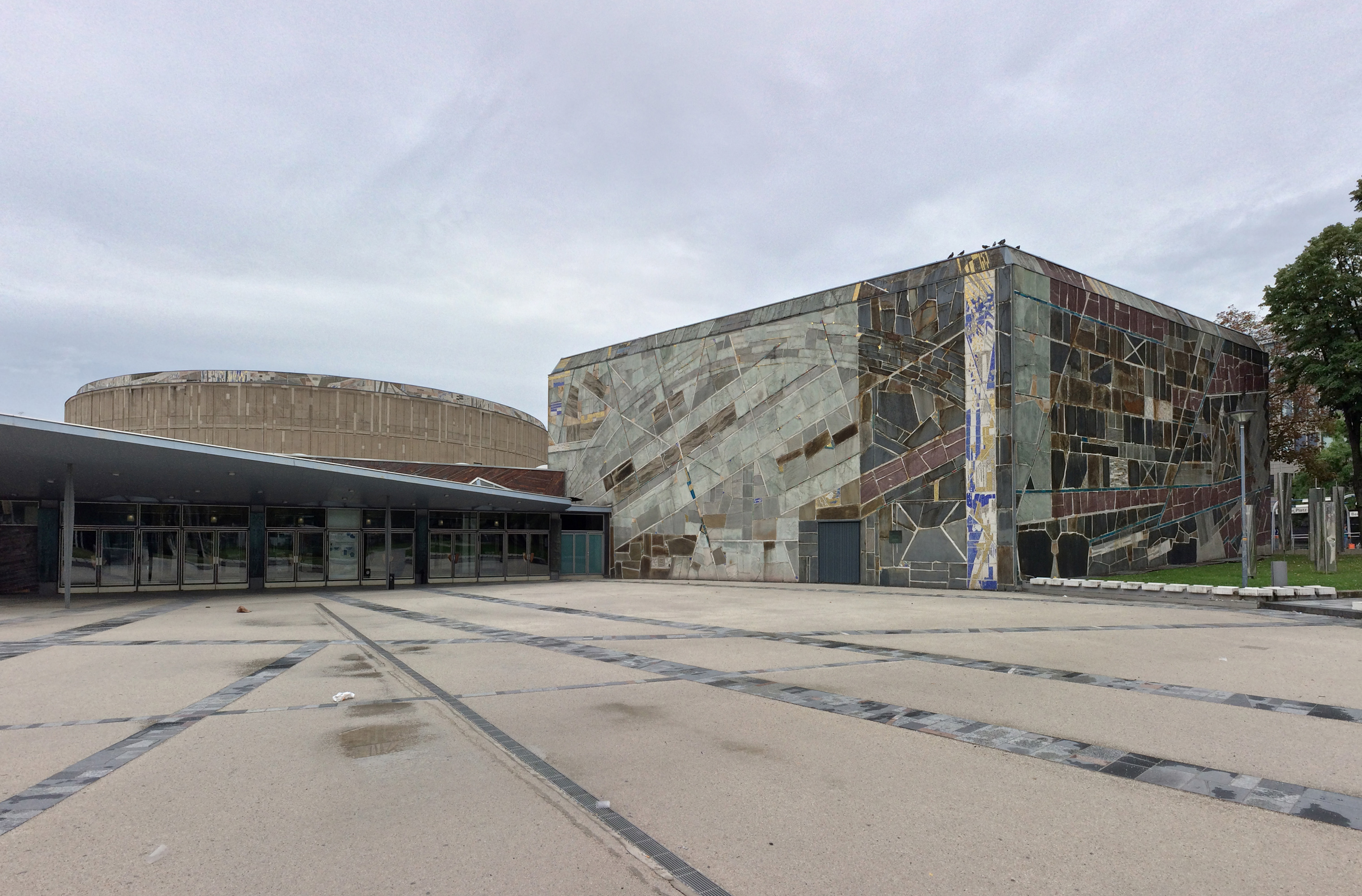
Liederhalle, Stuttgart

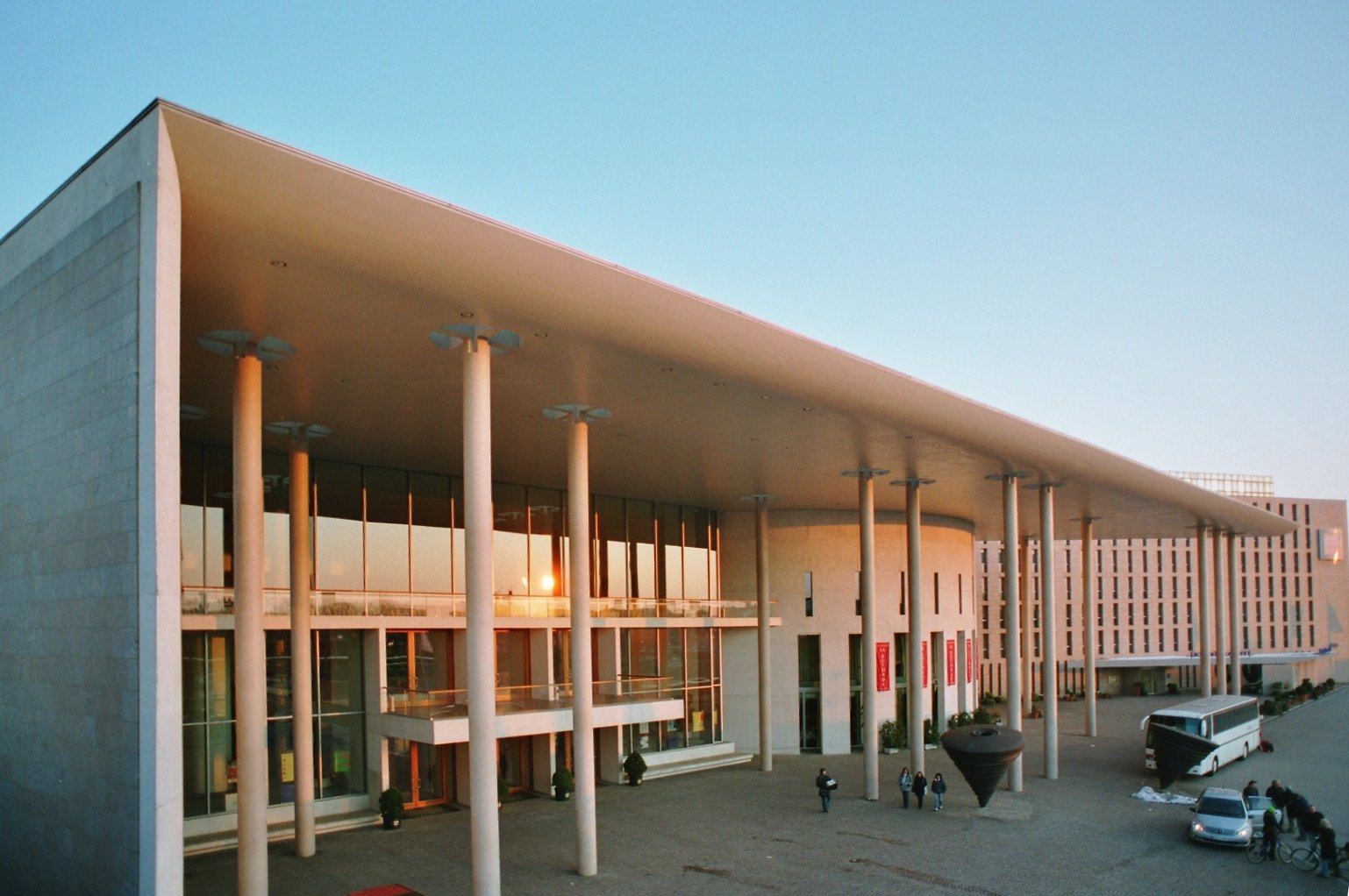
Konzerthaus Freiburg

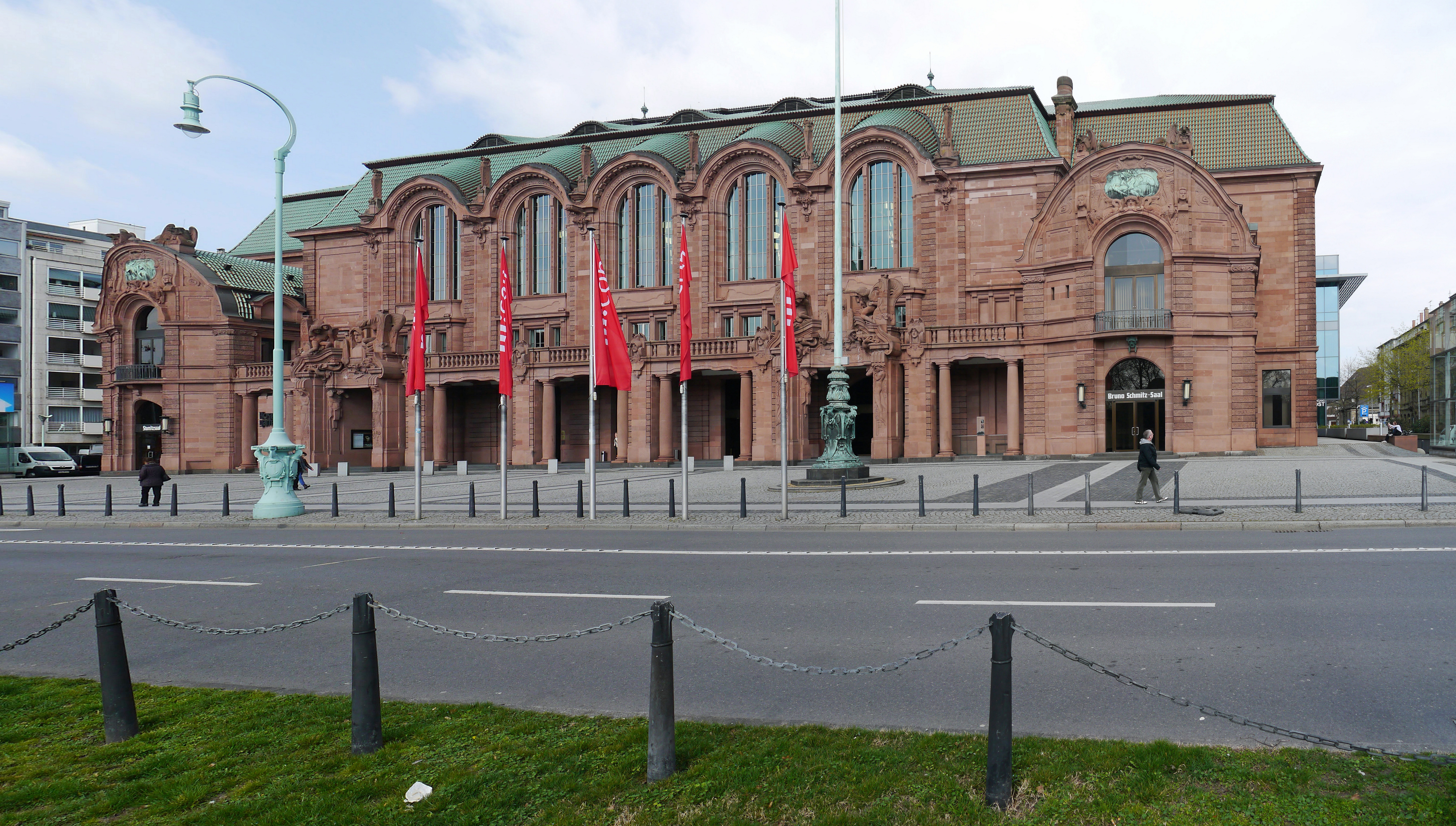
Rosengarten, Mannheim

The orchestra also performs in other German cities and venues, including the following:

- Karlsruhe (Konzerthaus; Hochschule fur Gestaltung)
- Ulm (Congress Centrum)
- Dortmund (Konzerthaus)
- Donaueschingen (Baarsporthalle)
