= Cello Concerto No. 2 (Saint-Saëns) =

Composition by Camille Saint-Saëns

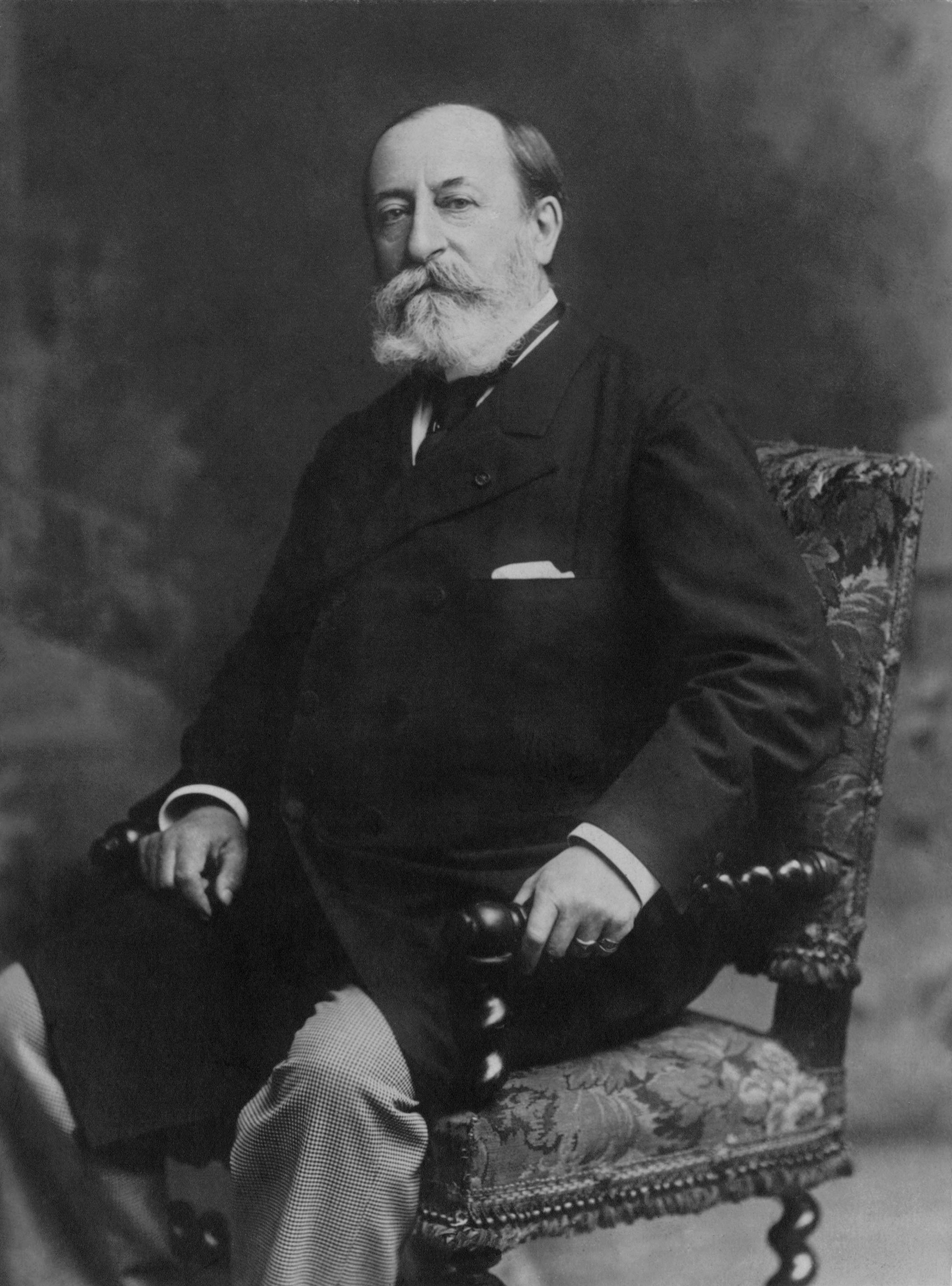
Camille Saint-Saëns in 1900 by Pierre Petit

Saint-Saëns' Cello Concerto No. 2 in D minor, Op. 119, is written in two movements, like his Fourth Piano Concerto. It was composed in 1902 and is dedicated to the Dutch cellist, Joseph Hollman, who gave the first performance on February 5, 1905 in Paris. The concerto has been praised for its thematic material within its two movements, though it remains less popular than the composer's Cello Concerto No. 1.

== Music ==
The two movements are:

1. Allegro moderato e maestoso – Andante sostenuto
2. Allegro non troppo – Cadenza – Molto allegro

The first part of the first movement is in ternary form. The second part is a prayer, in E♭ major, also in ternary form. The first movement ends with a scale in artificial harmonics, like the scale in the First Cello Concerto. The second movement is a moto perpetuo in G minor. It ends abruptly in a cadenza, followed by a major-key recapitulation of the first movement, and a coda.

Along with the solo cello, the concerto is scored for an orchestra consisting of 2 flutes, 2 oboes, 2 clarinets, 2 bassoons, 4 horns, 2 trumpets, timpani and strings.

== Recordings ==
- Lynn Harrell (Cello) and Riccardo Chailly (Radio-Symphonie-Orchester-Berlin). CD Decca 1986
- Steven Isserlis (Cello) and Michael Tilson Thomas (London Symphony Orchestra). CD RCA Victor 1993
- Maria Kliegel (Cello) and Jean-François Monnard (Bournemouth Sinfonietta). CD Naxos 1995
- Torleif Thedéen (Cello) and Jean-Jacques Kantorow (Tapiola Sinfonietta). CD Bis Records 1998
- Steven Isserlis (Cello) and Christoph Eschenbach (NDR-Sinfonieorchester). CD RCA Victor 1999
- Jeremy Findlay (Cello) and Jose Maria Florencio Junior (Poznan Philharmonic Orchestra). CD DUX 2003
- Zuill Bailey (Cello) and David Wiley (Roanoke Symphony Orchestra) & Cello Concerto n°1. CD Delos International 2005
- Jamie Walton (Cello) and Alex Briger (Philharmonia Orchestra), (with cello concerto n°1). CD Quartz 2006
- Johannes Moser (Cello) and Fabrice Bollon (Radio-Sinfonieorchester Stuttgart des SWR). CD Hänssler Classic 2008
- Piovano Luigi (Cello) and Orchestra del Teatro Marrucino, conducted by Piero Bellugi, (Integral Cello Work)). 2 CD Eloquens 2011
- Laszlo Varga (Cello) and Reinhard Peters (Westphalian Symphony Orchestra). 2 CD Vox 2014
- Christine Walevska (Cello) and Eliahu Inbal (Orchestre Philharmonique de Monte-Carlo), (complete works for Cello and Orchestra). Recorded 11/1973. LP Philips 1974. CD Decca Eloquence 2016
- Truls Mørk (Cello) and Neeme Järvi (Bergen Philharmonic Orchestra) (with Concerto n°1). CD Chandos 2016

== Sources ==
- Rees, Brian (1999). Camille Saint-Saëns – A Life. London: Chatto and Windus. ISBN 978-1-85619-773-1.
