= Roanoke Symphony Orchestra =

Symphony orchestra in Roanoke, Virginia, United States

Roanoke Symphony Orchestra (RSO)
- Orchestra
- Founded: 1953
- Location: Roanoke, Virginia, United States
- Concert hall: Berglund Performing Arts Theatre
- Music director: David S. Wiley
- Website: rso.com

The Roanoke Symphony Orchestra, also known as the "RSO", was established in 1953 by Gibson Morrissey and a number of other music lovers. Gibson Morrissey served as the conductor until his death in 1975.

The Roanoke Symphony Orchestra has professional musicians who are awarded positions through competitive auditions.

== Conductors ==
- 1953–1975 Gibson Morrissey
- 1975–1986 Jack Moehlenkamp
- 1986–1995 Victoria Bond
- 1996–Present David S. Wiley

== Concertmasters ==
- 1953
- Jim Glazebrook
- 2004–Present Akemi Takayama

== Roanoke Youth Symphony ==
The Roanoke Youth Symphony has three ensembles: The Roanoke Youth Symphony Orchestra (RYSO); the String Ensemble and the Flute Ensemble. The RSO and the Roanoke City Schools were joint recipients of the 2015 Yale Distinguished Music Educator Award. It has performed various programs for students of the area.

=== Roanoke Youth Symphony Orchestra ===
The Roanoke Youth Symphony Orchestra (RYSO) was established in 1956, and is the only professional orchestra training opportunity in western Virginia. This is a student orchestra made of more than 80 musicians, ranging in ages from 12 to 18. James Glazebrook has been the director since 1988. Musicians gain membership through annual auditions and may perform with the RYSO through their high school graduation.

=== String Ensemble ===
The String Ensemble was established in 1985 and is composed of about 50 string players ranging from ages 8 to 15. They rehearse weekly under the guidance and instruction of Ms. Michelle Smith Johnson.

=== Flute Ensemble ===
The Flute Ensemble was established in 2008, and is under the direction and instruction of Julee Hickcox, Principal Piccolo of the Roanoke Symphony Orchestra.

== Roanoke Symphony Chorus ==
The Roanoke Symphony Chorus was established in 1999 under the direction of Dr. John Hugo. In 2015, the "RSO's Holiday Pops" reaches over 6,000 music lovers in Virginia. The C Choir of the Roanoke Valley Children's Choir also participates with the RSO in the Holiday Pops each year.

== Support ==
The Roanoke Symphony Orchestra concerts and education programs are supported in part by the Virginia Commission for the Arts and the National Endowment for the Arts. The RSO is also supported by a number of local community groups, as well as "The Friends of the RSO"; the "New River Valley Friends of the RSO" and the Virginia Blue Ridge Musical Festival."

== Bibliography ==
- Roanoke Symphony Orchestra, and Roanoke Symphony Society. Symphony Seasons. [Roanoke, Va.]: Women's Auxiliary of the Roanoke Symphony Society, 1975. OCLC Number: 590568227.
- Brouwer, Margaret, and Victoria Bond. Shifting circles. 1990. Roanoke Symphony Orchestra; Victoria Bond, conductor. 1 sound cassette: analog, stereo. OCLC Number: 76791513.
- Walker, Gwyneth V. Roanoke rising. Boston, MA.: E.C. Schirmer, 1990. Premiered by the Roanoke Symphony Orchestra, Roanoke, Va., Apr. 13, 1992. 1 score (87 pages); 29 cm. OCLC: 25241225.
- Ptaszyńska, Marta, and Tina Davidson. La novella d'inverno Winter's tale : for strings. 1990. Title from container. "Commissioned and premiered by the Roanoke Symphony 1/31/95" (2nd work). 1 cassette. Performer(s): Polish Chamber Orchestra (1st work); Roanoke Symphony (2nd work).
- Roanoke Valley Horse Show. Music in Motion: World Class Horses and Equestrians Performing to Music by the Roanoke Symphony Orchestra. [Roanoke, Va.]: [Roanoke Valley Horse Show?], 1991. June 15, 1991, Salem Civic Center. Title appears on item as: The Roanoke Valley Horse Show presents Music in Motion.
- Davidson, Tina. They come dancing: for full orchestra. Philadelphia, PA: The composer, 1994. 1 score (86 pages); 36 cm. "Commissioned through a grant from Meet the Composer/Reader's Digest Commissioning Program and the Women's Philharmonic, the Westmoreland Symphony Orchestra, the New Orchestra of Westchester and the Roanoke Symphony.
- Beethoven, Ludwig van, and David Wiley. Symphony no. 9. Roanoke, Va: Roanoke Symphony Society], 1997. Performer(s): Rochelle Ellis, soprano; Bonita Hyman, mezzo-soprano; Philip Webb, tenor; Philip Kraus, baritone; Roanoke Symphony Orchestra; Roanoke Valley Choral Society; Liberty Concert Choir, Liberty University; Meistersingers and University Concert Choir, Virginia Polytechnical Institute; David Wiley, conductor. Event notes: Recorded live, April 28, 1997, Civic Center Auditorium, Roanoke, Virginia. Description: 1 sound disc: digital, stereo.
- Krieger, Norman, David Wiley, Edward MacDowell, and David Wiley. American piano concertos. Radford, Va: Roanoke Symphony Society], 1998. Performer(s): Norman Krieger, pianist; Roanoke Symphony Orchestra; David Wiley, conductor. Event notes: Recorded April 25–26, 1998 at Preston Hall, Radford University, VA. Description: 1 sound disc: digital.
- Bailey, Zuill, David Wiley, Camille Saint-Saëns, Camille Saint-Saëns, Jules Massenet, and Camille Saint-Saëns. Zuill Bailey in concert live 10/17/05. Los Angeles, CA: Delos, 2007. Performer(s): Zuill Bailey, violoncello; Roanoke Symphony Orchestra; David Wiley, conductor. Event notes: Recorded at the Roanoke Performing Arts Theatre on October 17, 2005. Description: 1 online resource (1 sound file). Contents: Cello concerto no. 1 in A minor, op. 33 (19:57); Cello concerto no. 2 in D minor, op. 119 (18:05) / Saint-Saëns - Meditation from Thaïs/Massenet (5:30) - The swan/Saint-Saëns (2:55). Other Titles: In concert live 10/17/05
- Midkiff, Jeff, and Jeff Midkiff. Mandolin concerto: "from the Blue Ridge". 2011. Notes: For manolin and orchestra. Commissioned by the Roanoke Symphony Orchestra. Duration: approximately 18 minutes. Description: 1 score (45 pages). Other Titles: From the Blue Ridge.
- Brouwer, Margaret. Pulse: for orchestra. 2014. Notes: Duration: 6 min. "Commissioned by David Wiley and the Roanoke Symphony Orchestra in honor of the Orchestra's 50th Anniversary"—Caption. "2003"—Caption. Description: 1 score (32 pages).
