= Joseph Hollman =

Dutch composer and cellist

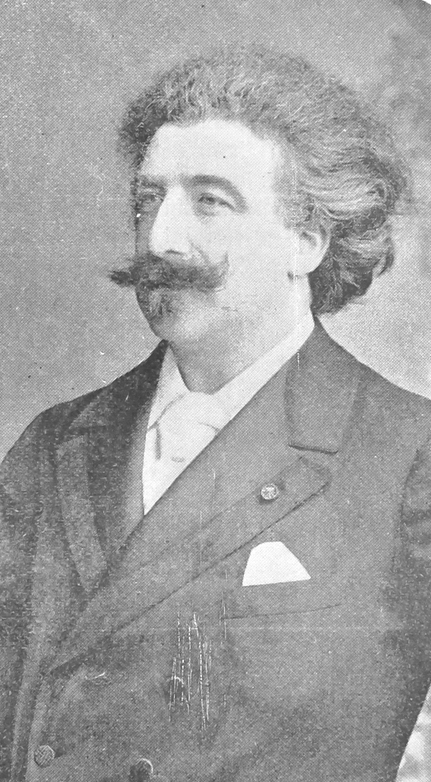
- Joseph Hollman on the cover of Freund's weekly
- Born: 26 October 1852
- Died: 31 December 1927 (aged 75)
- Occupation: cellist

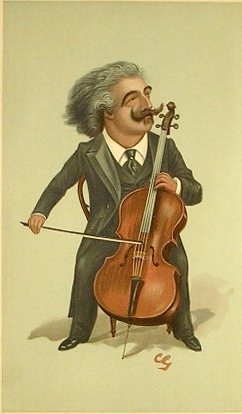
Hollman caricatured in Vanity Fair by Francis Carruthers Gould, 1897

Joseph Hollman (26 October 1852 – 31 December 1927), was a Dutch cellist.

== Biography ==
Hollman was born in Maastricht in 1852, and was admitted to the Brussels Conservatory at the age of fourteen. There he studied cello with Adrien-François Servais and music theory with François-Joseph Fétis. He continued his studies with Léon Jacquard in Paris and with Karl Davydov in St. Petersburg. In the 1880s he played in the Meiningen Court Orchestra. In 1887 he settled in Paris, where he established himself as a leading soloist. His concert travels took him to the United States, China and Japan.

Hollman composed a number of short works for his instrument. Camille Saint-Saëns, who frequently appeared in concert with Hollman, dedicated his Second Cello Concerto to him.

== Sources ==
- Rees, Brian (1999). Camille Saint-Saëns – A Life. London: Chatto and Windus. ISBN 978-1-85619-773-1.
