= Rosbaud =

Rosbaud is an Austrian surname. Notable people with the surname include:

- Hans Rosbaud (1895–1962), 20th Century Austrian conductor
- Paul Rosbaud, 20th Century Austrian scientist and spy for Great Britain during World War II

== See also ==
- Roubaud
