= Stuttgart Radio Symphony Orchestra =

German radio orchestra

- Orchestra
- Official logo
- Native name: Radio-Sinfonieorchester Stuttgart des SWR
- Former name: Sinfonieorchester von Radio Stuttgart (1945); Sinfonieorchester des Süddeutschen Rundfunks (1949); Südfunk-Sinfonieorchester (1959)
- Founded: 1945; 81 years ago
- Disbanded: 2016; 10 years ago
- Later name: SWR Symphonieorchester
- Location: Stuttgart, Germany
- Website: Official website

The Stuttgart Radio Symphony Orchestra (German: Radio-Sinfonieorchester Stuttgart des SWR) was a German radio orchestra based in Stuttgart in Germany.

== History ==
The ensemble was founded in 1945 by American occupation authorities as the orchestra for Radio Stuttgart, under the name Sinfonieorchester von Radio Stuttgart (Symphony Orchestra of Radio Stuttgart). The radio network later became the Süddeutscher Rundfunk (SDR, South German Radio), and the orchestra changed its name in 1949 to the Sinfonieorchester des Süddeutschen Rundfunks (South German Radio Symphony Orchestra). In 1959, the orchestra took on the name Südfunk-Sinfonieorchester. The orchestra acquired its final name in 1975.

Like many broadcast orchestras in Germany, the orchestra had a reputation for performing contemporary music. Past principal conductors included Sir Neville Marriner (1983–1989), who later held the title of principal guest conductor. Georges Prêtre, who became the orchestra's artistic director in 1996, later held the title of Ehrendirigent (honorary conductor) with the orchestra. From 1998 to 2011, Roger Norrington was principal conductor, and incorporated his ideas of historically informed performance, including minimal use of vibrato, into the orchestra's style of playing. Following his tenure with the orchestra, Norrington shared the title of Ehrendirigent with Georges Prêtre. In March 2010, the orchestra announced the appointment of Stéphane Denève as its next principal conductor, starting with the 2011-2012 season. His initial contract was for 3 years. In June 2013, the orchestra announced the extension of Denève's contract through the 2015-2016 season. Denève concluded his tenure as chief conductor at the close of the 2015-2016 season, and was the final conductor to hold the title of chief conductor of the orchestra.

In June 2012, the SWR Broadcasting Council voted to approve a measure proposed by SWR Intendant Peter Boudgoust to merge the Stuttgart Radio Symphony Orchestra with the Southwest German Radio Symphony Orchestra, for ostensible reasons of budgetary limitations for two separate orchestras affiliated with the SWR. The SWR Broadcasting Council formally passed the measure in September 2012, with the merger of the two orchestras scheduled to occur in 2016. International protests at the proposal emerged. The orchestra gave its final concert on 28 July 2016 under the direction of Norrington, at the Royal Albert Hall as part of The Proms. The replacement orchestra is the SWR Symphonieorchester.

The orchestra recorded for several labels, including Hänssler and ECM New Series.

== Principal conductors ==
- Hans Müller-Kray (1948–1969)
- Sergiu Celibidache (1971–1977)
- Neville Marriner (1983–1989)
- Gianluigi Gelmetti (1989–1998)
- Roger Norrington (1998–2011)
- Stéphane Denève (2011–2016)
