= David S. Wiley (conductor) =

American conductor

David Stewart Wiley (born 1966 in Princeton, NJ) is the Conductor of the Roanoke Symphony Orchestra and was the Conductor and music director of the Long Island Philharmonic from 2001 until its demise in 2016. He has previously served as Assistant Conductor of the Minnesota Orchestra and the Indianapolis Symphony Orchestra. He also served as artistic director of the Wintergreen Summer Music Festival from 1999 to 2006.

Wiley first gained national attention when he won the Aspen Conducting Prize in 1993, which led to his being named as Assistant Conductor for the 1994 Aspen Music Festival. Wiley holds a Doctor of Music degree (in conducting) and a Master of Music degree from Indiana University, and holds a degree in piano performance with honors from the New England Conservatory of Music and a bachelor's degree in religion from Tufts, where he was also one of the founders of the award-winning a cappella group, The Amalgamates of Tufts University.

Wiley is an alumnus of the Music Academy of the West.
