= Maria Kliegel =

German cellist

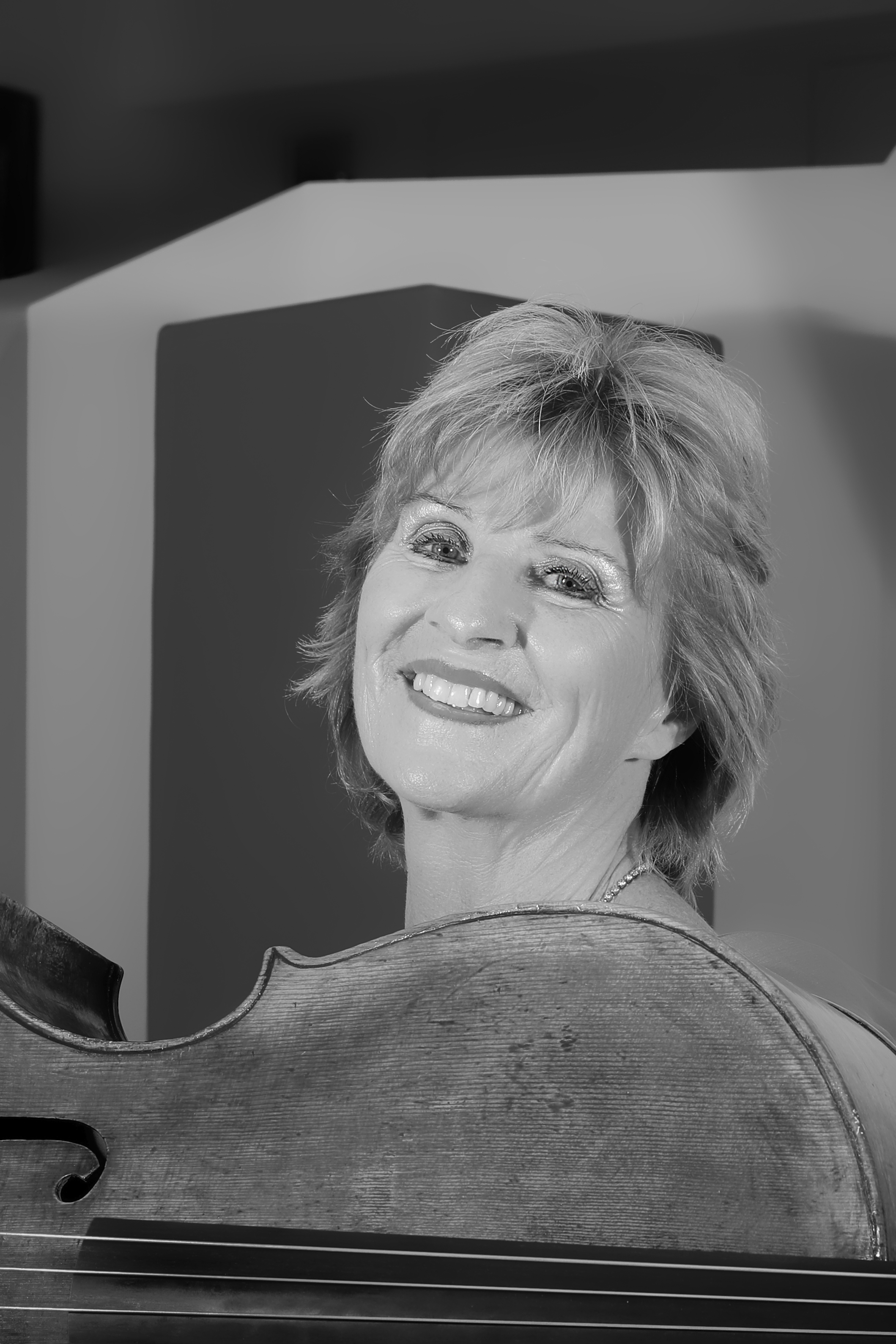
- Born: 14 November 1952 (age 72); Dillenburg, Germany
- Occupation: Cellist
- Website: www.maria-kliegel.com

Maria Kliegel (born 14 November 1952) is a German cellist.

== Professional career ==
Kliegel was born in Dillenburg, Hesse. She studied under Janos Starker starting at the age of 19. She won first prize at the American College Competition, First German Music Competition and Concours Aldo Parisot, and was also the Grand Prize winner at the second Mstislav Rostropovich International Cello Competition in 1981.

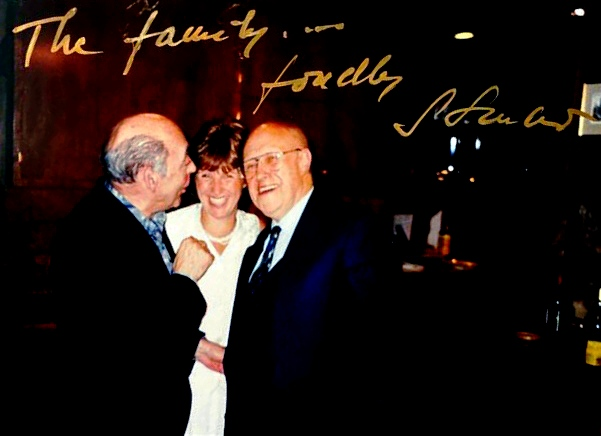
Maria Kliegel with János Starker and Mstislav Rostropovich in Bloomington, USA, 1999

Russian composer Alfred Schnittke recognized her interpretation as the standard recording of his work when she recorded his First Concerto for Cello and Orchestra in 1990. On top of this, she has done many recordings for Naxos, including concertos and other cello works by Beethoven, Bloch, Brahms, Bruch, Dohnányi, Dvořák, Elgar, Lalo, Saint-Saëns, Shostakovich, Schumann, Tavener and Tchaikovsky. She has also recorded a large volume of chamber music by Brahms, Chopin, Demus, Gubaidulina, Kodály, Mendelssohn and Schubert. She will soon be recording Beethoven's complete works for cello and piano, Haydn's cello concertos and Bach's solo cello suites.

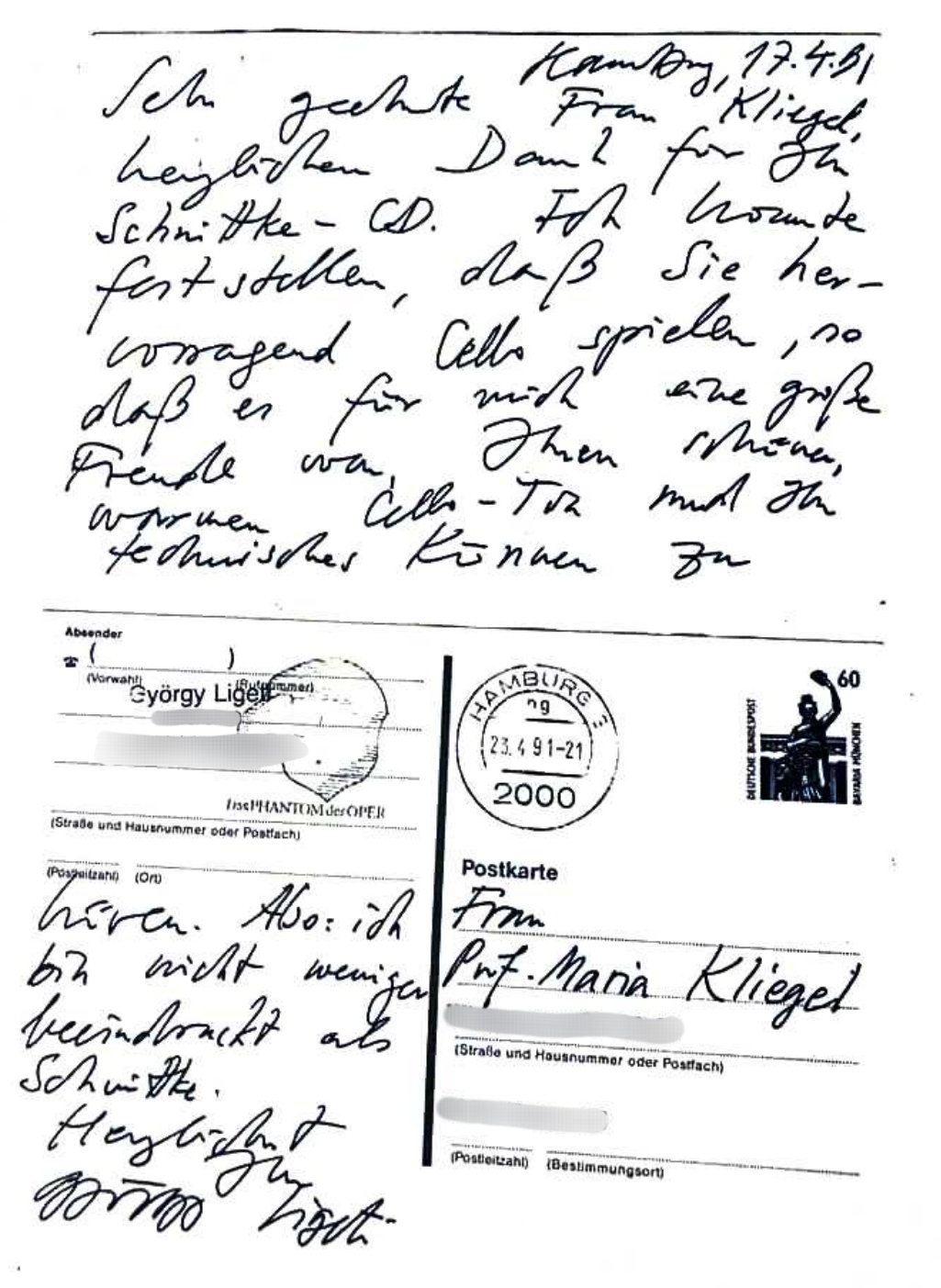
Postcard from György Ligeti to Maria Kliegel

She formerly played a Stradivarius, which has become known as the ex-Gendron, for the famous French cellist Maurice Gendron. Currently, she performs on a cello made by Carlo Tononi in Venice c. 1730.

Since 1986 she has taught a master class at the Hochschule für Musik Köln.

== Maria Kliegel and Nelson Mandela ==
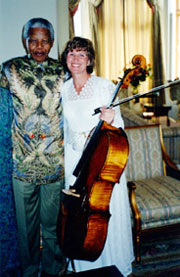
Maria Kliegel and Nelson Mandela in his residence on November 11, 1997

In 1995, moved after reading Nelson Mandela's autobiography, Maria Kliegel decided to find a way to pay tribute to him through classical music. Thus was born the idea of creating a piece called Hommage à Nelson M. for cello and percussion. By combining these instruments, Maria Kliegel wanted to build a musical bridge between the European musical tradition and the native sense of rhythm of South Africa's black population. After contacting composer Wilhelm Kaiser-Lindemann and pitching the idea to him, she found an ally in him. It became the goal of both of them to bring the work to a South African premiere with Mandela as the guest of honor.

Thanks to her friendship with the then president of North Rhine-Westphalia and later German president Johannes Rau, she managed to deliver a letter to Mandela during his state visit to Germany, informing him of the resulting idea.

Since concert plans in South Africa could not be made, and the artist wanted to send the composition as a message to the world as soon as possible, the premiere took place in December 1996 before a very moved audience at the townhall in Düsseldorf.

In 1997, Maria Kliegel received an invitation to give a concert on September 24, South African Heritage Day, at the Nico Theatre in Cape Town. Nelson Mandela, then president of South Africa, was to sit in the front row as the guest of honor. Unfortunately, a day before the concert, Mandela canceled his arrival due to other presidential duties. He did, however, arrange for his most trusted friend Govan Mbeki, father of the next president Thabo Mbeki, to be at the concert as his representative. The latter, already 85 years old at the time, returned backstage after the performance, visibly moved, and invited Maria Kliegel to visit him in parliament the next day, assuring him that he would tell his friend Nelson everything in detail.

After returning to Germany, a few weeks later Maria Kliegel received an invitation from President Mandela to visit him at his residence in Cape Town. And so, finally, a meeting took place on November 11, 1997, during which Maria Kliegel performed a private solo concert at Nelson Mandela's home.

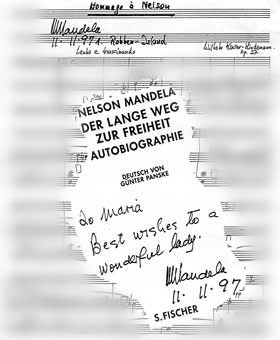
Nelson Mandela's autograph for Maria Kliegel on the title page of his autobiography and the first page of the work Hommage á Nelson by M. Wilhelm Kaiser-Lindemann

Nelson Mandela, very moved by the composition, thanked Maria Kliegel with a handshake. At the end of the meeting, the artist presented Mandela with a rose bush, because, as she read in his autobiography, he loved plants and since childhood always planted small or large gardens whenever he had the opportunity to do so - even in prison. He again extended his hand to her in thanks, and then said: "I will take care of this rose for many years, it will always be a special bond between us."

In 1999, the Naxos label released a recording of Hommage à Nelson M., performed by Maria Kliegel and percussionist Stephan Froleyks, with part of the proceeds from sales donated to the Nelson Mandela Children's Fund.

== Selected recordings ==
- Camille Saint-Saëns, Cello concerto n°1 & n°2, Suite op.16, The Swan, Allegro Appassionato op.43, Bournemouth Sinfonietta, conductor Jean-François Monnard. CD Naxos 1995
