= Auguste Tolbecque =

French cellist (1830 - 1919)

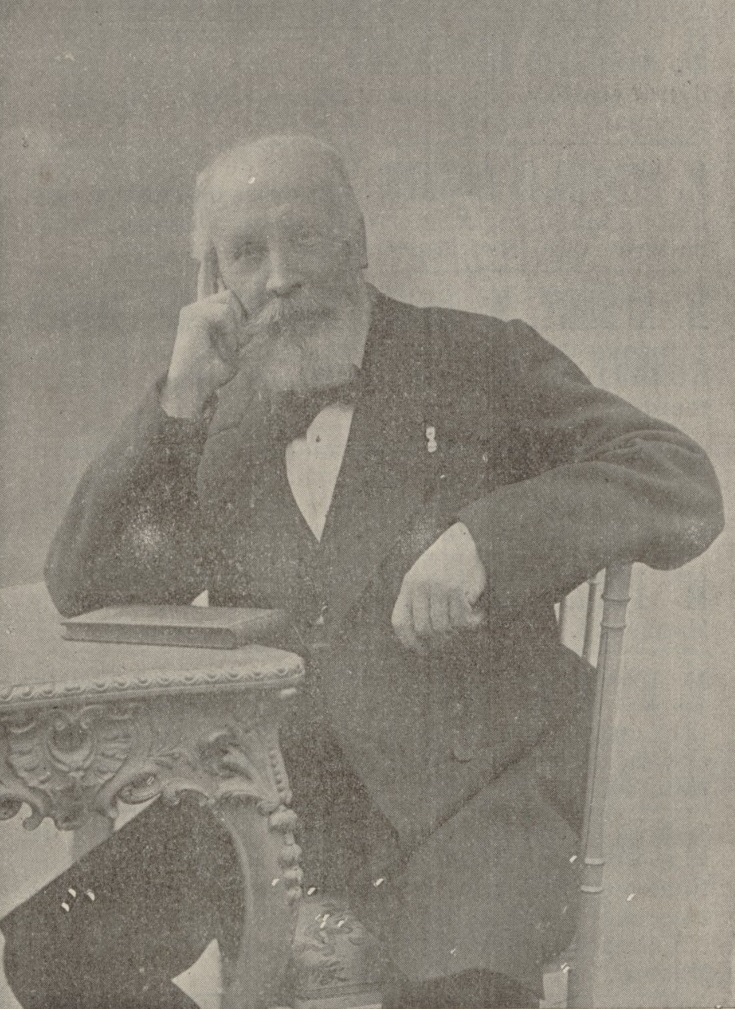
- Born: 30 March 1830; Paris
- Died: 8 March 1919 (aged 88)
- Occupation(s): Cellist; Composer; Conductor; Luthier

Auguste Tolbecque (March 30, 1830 – March 8, 1919) was a French cellist who composed a number of etudes for his instrument. Born in Paris, Tolbecque studied cello with Olive-Charlier Vaslin at the Conservatoire de Paris, where he was awarded the premier prix for cello in 1849. He later taught at the Marseille Conservatory from 1865–1871, followed by a period in Paris, where he performed with the Société des Concerts du Conservatoire, as well as with the Maurin and Lamoureux string quartets. On January 19, 1873, Tolbecque premiered Camille Saint-Saëns Cello Concerto No. 1, a work which was dedicated to him by the composer.

In addition to his career as a professional cellist, Tolbecque built and constructed a number of historical instruments, and would often perform works on viola da gamba during his recitals. Many of his instruments were acquired for the collection of the Brussels Conservatoire (now the Musical Instrument Museum) in 1879.
