= Cello Concerto No. 1 (Saint-Saëns) =

Concerto composed by Camille Saint-Saëns

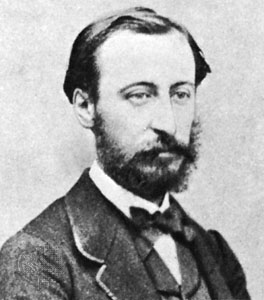
Camille Saint-Saëns in 1875

Camille Saint-Saëns composed his Cello Concerto No. 1 in A minor, Op. 33, in 1872, when he was 37 years old. He wrote this work for the French cellist, viola da gamba player and instrument maker Auguste Tolbecque. Tolbecque was part of a distinguished family of musicians closely associated with the Société des Concerts du Conservatoire, France's leading concert society. The concerto was first performed on January 19, 1873, at the Paris Conservatoire concert with Tolbecque as soloist. This was considered a mark of Saint-Saëns' growing acceptance by the French musical establishment.

Sir Donald Francis Tovey later wrote "Here, for once, is a violoncello concerto in which the solo instrument displays every register without the slightest difficulty in penetrating the orchestra." Many composers, including Shostakovich and Rachmaninoff, considered this concerto to be the greatest of all cello concertos. Yo-Yo Ma's recording of five "Great Cello Concertos" includes Dvořák's, Elgar's, Haydn's 2nd, Saint-Saëns' first, and Schumann's.

== Structure and overview ==
I. Allegro non troppo

II. Allegretto con moto

III. Tempo I
Skidmore College Orchestra

Saint-Saëns broke with convention in writing the concerto. Instead of using the normal three-movement concerto form, he structured the piece in one continuous movement. This single movement contains three distinct sections. Those sections, tightly structured, share interrelated ideas. Saint-Saëns' contact with Franz Liszt while serving as organist at the Église de la Madeleine may have led him to use cyclic form in his orchestral works.

Along with the solo cello, the concerto is scored for an orchestra consisting of 2 flutes, 2 oboes, 2 clarinets, 2 bassoons, 2 horns, 2 trumpets, timpani and strings.

The work is split into three different movements as follows:

1. Allegro non troppo
2. Allegretto con moto
3. Tempo I

Saint-Saëns very often uses the solo cello here as a declamatory instrument. This keeps the soloist in the dramatic and musical foreground, the orchestra offering a shimmering backdrop. The music is tremendously demanding for soloists, especially in the fast third section. This difficulty has not stopped the concerto from becoming a favourite of the great virtuoso cellists.

=== I. Allegro non troppo ===
The concerto begins unusually. Instead of the traditional orchestral introduction, the piece begins with one short chord from the orchestra. The cello follows, stating the main motif. Soon, countermelodies flow from both the orchestra and soloist, at times the two playfully "calling and answering" each other.

1st movement, 1st theme (A minor)

1st movement, 2nd theme

1st movement, 3rd theme

1st movement, 4th theme (piano reduction, F major)

=== II. Allegretto con moto ===
The turbulent opening movement leads into a brief but highly original minuet, in which the strings are muted, and which contains a cello cadenza.

2nd movement theme (B♭ major)

=== III. Tempo I ===
The finale opens with a restatement of the opening material from the first movement. Saint-Saëns introduces two new themes but also includes the recapitulation of the fourth theme from the first movement, tying the whole design together. After a final restatement of the opening theme, he concludes by introducing an entirely new idea for the cello.

3rd movement, 1st theme (A minor)

3rd movement, 2nd theme (F major)

3rd movement, 3rd theme (A major)

== Recordings ==
- Mstislav Rostropovich, Philharmonia Orchestra, conducted by Sir Malcolm Sargent. Recorded 1955. SACD Praga 2013. Diapason d'or
- André Navarra, Orchestre de L'Association des Concerts Lamoureux, conducted by Charles Munch. CD Erato 1965
- Christine Walevska, Orchestre Philharmonique de Monte-Carlo, conducted by Eliahu Inbal. Recorded 11/1973. CD Philips 1974
- Mstislav Rostropovich, London Philharmonic Orchestra, conducted by Carlo Maria Giulini. CD EMI 1978
- Matt Haimovitz, Chicago Symphony Orchestra, conducted by James Levine. CD DG 1989
- Jacqueline du Pré, Philadelphia Orchestra, conducted by Daniel Barenboim. Emi 1971 report CD Teldec 1991
- Maria Kliegel, Bournemouth Sinfonietta, conducted by Jean-François Monnard. CD Naxos 1995
- Torleif Thedéen, Tapiola Sinfonietta, conducted by Jean-Jacques Kantorow. CD Bis Records 1998
- Jeremy Findlay (Cello) and Jose Maria Florencio Junior (Poznan Philharmonic Orchestra). CD DUX 2003
- Piovano Luigi, Orchestra del Teatro Marrucino, conducted by Piero Bellugi, (Integral cello work)), 2 CD Eloquens 2011
- Gautier Capuçon, Orchestre philharmonique de Radio France, conducted by Lionel Bringuier. CD Erato 2013
- Natalie Clein, BBC Scottish Symphony Orchestra conducted by Andrew Manze (with Saint-Saëns' Concerto No. 2 and other works), Hyperion CDA68002 2014
- Truls Mørk, Bergen Philharmonic Orchestra, conducted by Neeme Järvi . CD Chandos 2016
