= Jiří Gemrot =

Czech composer and producer

Jiří Gemrot (born 15 April 1957 in Prague) is a Czech composer, radio executive, and a record producer. Since 1990 he has been director in chief of Czech Radio in Prague. As a composer, his music has been performed by all of the Czech Republic's major orchestras.

Gemrot studied at the Prague Conservatory from 1972 to 1976 where he was a pupil of Ema Doležalová and Jan Zdeněk Bartoš. He then entered the Academy of Performing Arts in Prague where he studied under Jiří Pauer through 1981. From 1982 to 1986 he was a music director for Czech Radio and since 1986 he has been a record producer for Panton Records. He has also worked as a music director for Czechoslovak Television. His best known composition internationally is his work for chorus and orchestra Psalm 146 (1992).

== Selected works ==
Orchestra

- Pocty (Hommages) (1983)
- Tance a reflexe (Dances and Reflections) (1987)
- Sentence (Maxims) for 15 stringed instruments (1986)
- Tři adagia (Three Adagios) (1989)
- Americká předehra (American Overture) (1996)
- Sympohony No. 1 for chamber orchestra (2007)
- Sympohony No. 2 for symphonic orchestra (2012-13)

Concertante

- Concerto for cello and orchestra (1984)
- Concerto for violin and orchestra (1990)
- Concerto for flute and orchestra (1992)
- Concertino for harp and string orchestra (1998)
- Concertino for flute, timpani, bagpipes and orchestra (2002)
- Dvojkoncert (Double Concerto) for cello, piano and string orchestra (2002–2003)
- Concerto (Jednovětý; In One Movement) for piano and orchestra (2003)
- Concertino for cello, piano and orchestra (2004)
- Concerto for cello and chamber orchestra (2009)

Chamber music

- Sonatina for flute and piano (1978)
- Sonata No.2 for viola and piano (1979)
- Sonata for harp (1980)
- Návraty a proměny (Returns and Metamorphoses) for piano and 9 wind instruments (1981)
- Invokace (Invocation) for violin and organ (1983)
- Sonata for clarinet and piano (1983)
- Fantazie for accordion solo (1984)
- Fantasy and Toccata for guitar solo (1984)
- Invence (Invention) for violin and viola (1984)
- Sonata for flute, alto flute and piano (1985)
- Momenty (Moments) for oboe, clarinet and bassoon (1985)
- Preludia (Preludes) for viola and piano (1986)
- Meditace (Meditation) for viola and organ (1986)
- Rapsódie for bassoon and piano (1986)
- Letní studie (Summer Studies) for saxophone quartet (1986)
- Bukolika (Bucolics) for string quartet (1987)
- Rapsódie č. 2 (Rhapsody No.2) for oboe and piano (1988)
- Hudba pro Kačku (Music for Ducky) for violin and piano (1991)
- Invence II (Invention II) for cello and double bass (1991)
- Šalmajana, Suite for 6 instruments of the oboe family (1996)
- Quintet for piano and string quartet (2001)
- Letní suita (Summer Suite) for violin and harpsichord (2002)
- Sapporiana for flute and guitar (2003)
- Romance for violin and piano (2004)
- String Quartet (2005)
- Piano Trio No.2 (2006)
- Quintet for clarinet and string quartet (2006)
- Sonatina for flute and harpsichord (2007)

Keyboard

- Sonatina gaia for piano (1977)
- Sonata No.1 for piano (1981)
- Sonata No.2 for piano (1985)
- Freska (Fresco) for organ (1987)
- Sólo for harpsichord (1987)
- Sonata No.4 for piano (1996)
- Lacrymosa, Fantasy Variations for Piano 4-hands (2000)
- Hry (Games) for harpsichord (2003)
- Malá suita (Little Suite) for piano (2006)
- Z deníku (From the Dairy) for piano (2006)
- Pastorale a duplex (Pastorale and Duplex) for harpsichord (2007)

Vocal

- Čtyři písně na básně Paula Verlaina (Four Songs to Poems by Paul Verlaine) for tenor and piano (1981)
- Pět lyrických písní na verše Ingeborg Bachmannové (Five Lyrical Songs to Poems by Ingeborg Bachmann) for soprano and piano (1984)
- Lauda, Sion, Cantata for baritone and wind orchestra (1993)
- Olžiny písně (Olga's Songs), 5-Part Song Cycle for mezzo-soprano and cello (1993)
- Ukolébavka (Lullaby) for mezzo-soprano, cello and piano (2002)

Choral

- Kantáta beze slov (Cantata without Words) for vocal ensemble (1982)
- Psalmus 146 for chorus and orchestra (1992)
- Mše in C (Mass in C) for mixed chorus (1994)
- Bachmannlieder for chorus and orchestra (1998)
- Milostná ronda (Love Rondos), Melodrama Cycle with piano (2000)
