= Jeremy Findlay =

Canadian cellist

Jeremy Findlay (born c. 1971) is a Canadian cellist who has had an active international performance career in both the concert and chamber music repertoire since the mid-1980s. Since 1994 he has performed and recorded many works with pianist Elena Braslavsky. Czech composer Jiří Gemrot has written numerous pieces for them, including the Double Concerto for Cello, Piano and Orchestra which they performed in its premiere at the Rudolfinum in Prague with the Prague Philharmonia. He recorded an album with the Prague Sinfonietta Orchestra and conductor Tvrtko Karlović entitled A Canadian in Prague (1995, J&J Elason; distributed by the Canadian Music Council).

The son of cellist William Findlay and it is from him that he received his first musical training, initially at his family's home and later at The Royal Conservatory of Music. In 1988 he was awarded the Tom Thomas Music Scholarship; a competitive scholarship administered by the Toronto Symphony Orchestra. 100 He pursued further studies at the University of Toronto with Daniel Domb, graduating with a master's degree in 1992. He then studied chamber music with Sándor Végh at the European Mozart Academy. He later received grants from both the Canada Council and the Ontario Arts Council which enabled him to study under Christoph Richter in Germany and Josef Chuchro at the Academy of Performing Arts in Prague. He has also attended masterclasses taught by Boris Pergamenschikow and Yo-Yo Ma.

Findlay won first prize at the Kiwanis Music Festival's concerto competition in 1990. He has appeared as a soloist with numerous orchestras, including the Toronto Symphony Orchestra, the Lodz Philharmonic, and the Warsaw Radio Orchestra to name just a few. As a recitalist and chamber musician he has performed at the Aix-en-Provence Festival, the Théâtre des Champs Elysées in Paris, the Konzerthaus Berlin, and Alice Tully Hall in New York City's Lincoln Center among others. He regularly appears in concerts, has released several commercial recordings and has been featured on radio and television throughout North America and Europe.

Findlay and his father co-founded a music festival in the village of Canna, Calabria. The festival was the subject of a documentary film made by Bravo TV which aired in 2007.
