= Christine Walevska =

American classical cellist

- Born: March 8, 1945 (age 81); Los Angeles
- Genres: Classical
- Occupations: Cellist, pedagogue
- Instrument: Cello
- Years active: 1960s–present
- Labels: Owl; Leaf; Philips; Decca Classics; Rhine Classics

Christine Walevska (born March 8, 1945, Los Angeles) is an American classical cellist. She is known for her numerous recordings with Philips Records and performing concerts worldwide. In 1975, she became the first American concert musician to perform in Cuba under the regime of Fidel Castro. The music critic Antonio Hernandez of the Brazilian newspaper O Globo referred to Walevska as the "goddess of the cello," a moniker to which she has often since been referred.

== Stolen cello ==
When Christine was small, her father bought her a rare antique concert-quality children's cello, hoping to spur her interest in the instrument, which it did. After she graduated to a full size cello, the instrument was stolen, and its whereabouts remained unknown for 40 years. When finally found, the current owner (who did not know it had been stolen) had rented it out to another very young but supremely talented cellist, whose family had spent years looking for a concert quality instrument suitable for a young cellist. After meeting the young girl, who loved the instrument as she did, Christine decided not to pursue retrieving her stolen property until after the student had graduated to a larger cello.

== CD releases ==
- Prokofiev & Khachaturian: Cello Concertos (O.National de l’Opéra de Monte-Carlo, Eliahu Inbal – 1972) | Philips Classics 434 166-2 | 1992
- Haydn: Cello Concertos (English Chamber O., Edo de Waart – 1972) | Philips Classics 438 797-2 | compilation two-CD 1993
- Christine Walevska – Legendary Recordings / the complete Philips original releases | Decca Classics [JP] 480 4532 | five-CD box 2010
- Saint-Saëns: Music for Cello and Orchestra (O.National de l’Opéra de Monte-Carlo, Eliahu Inbal – 1973) | Decca Eloquence 4822033 | 2016
- Christine Walevska – Goddess of the Cello (Akimi Fukuhara, piano) | Leaf Music LM206 | 2017
- Músicos.ar | Christine Walevska / Daniel Goldstein & Friends (Pablo Agri, Matias Grande, Elizabeth Ridolfi) | Fonocal | 2019
- Christine Walevska: The Beauty & The Bow (Private Archive Recordings) (works by: Bach, Sancan, Tchaikovsky, Bolognini, Ravel, Haydn/Piatigorsky, Nin, Saint-Saëns, Françaix, Ginastera, Bloch, Couperin/Bazelaire, Prokofiev, Debussy, Weber/Piatigorsky, Chopin/Piatigorsky, Chopin/Fournier, Brahms, Dvorak, Popper, Piazzolla, W.Schuman, Hindemith, Beethoven) | Rhine Classics RH-034 | eight-CD box 2024 | reviews | Discogs
