= La damnation de Faust (Georg Solti recording) =

- Decca CD: 414 680 2

Studio album by Georg Solti
- Released: 1982
- Studios: Medinah Temple, Chicago
- Genre: Classical vocal
- Length: 126:55
- Languages: French, Latin and Infernal
- Label: Decca
- Producer: James Mallinson

La damnation de Faust
- Decca Opéra Rouge CD: 455 826 2

La damnation de Faust is a 126-minute studio album of Hector Berlioz's légende dramatique, performed by José van Dam, Malcolm King, Kenneth Riegel, Frederica von Stade and the Chicago Symphony Orchestra and Chorus under the direction of Georg Solti. It was released in 1982.

== Recording ==
The album was digitally recorded in May 1981 in the Medinah Temple, Chicago.

== Packaging ==
The cover art shared by the LP, cassette and CD editions of the album when it was first released is Faust and Méphistophélès by Ferdinand Victor Eugène Delacroix (1798-1863), a painting in the Wallace Collection, London.

== Critical reception ==
=== Reviews ===
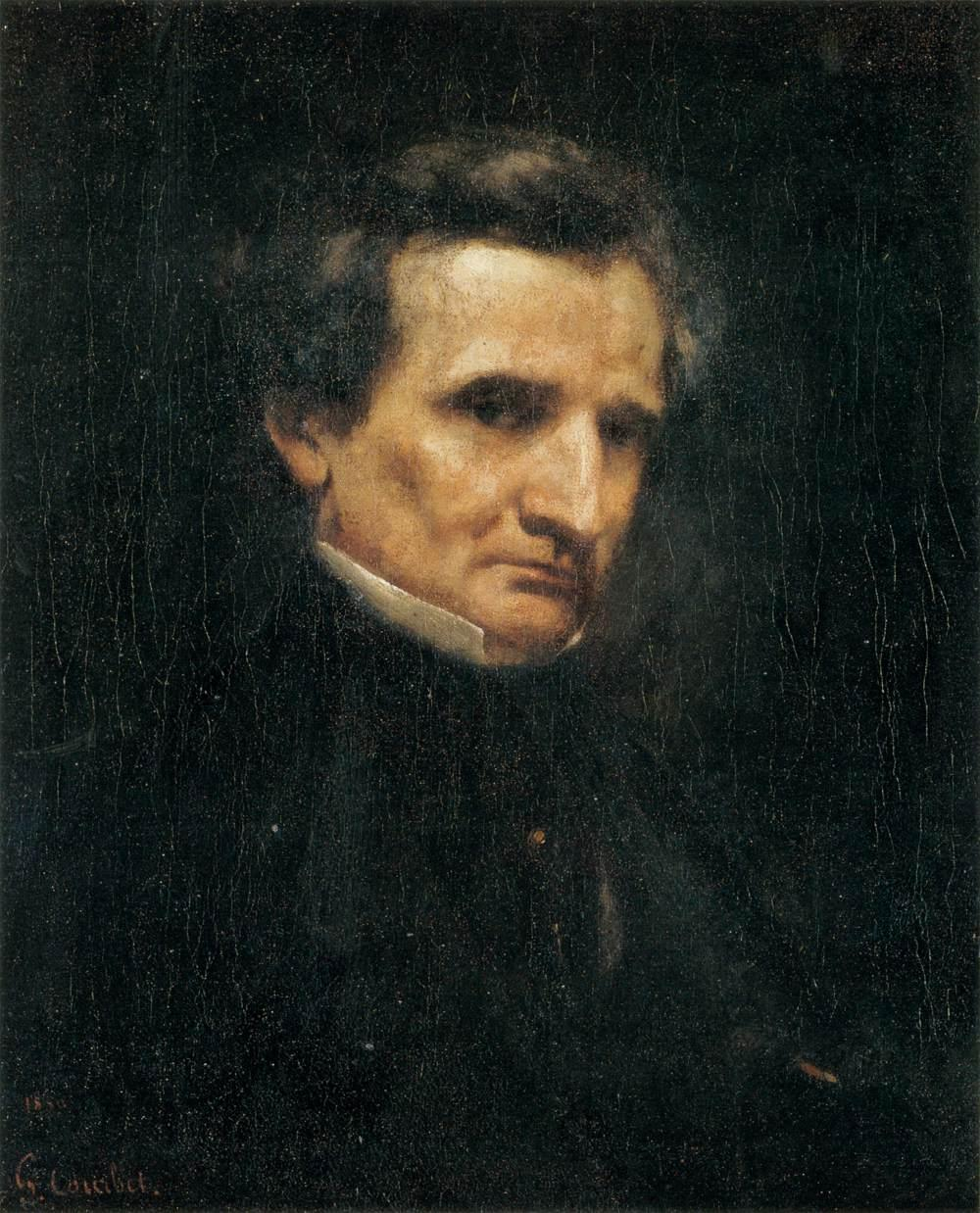
Hector Berlioz, painted by Gustave Courbet in 1850

Alan Blyth reviewed the album on LP in Gramophone in May 1982, comparing it with earlier recordings of La damnation de Faust conducted by Colin Davis and Daniel Barenboim. Frederica von Stade's Marguerite, he wrote, was sensibly phrased and sounded plausibly youthful, and her "Roi de Thule" was done "simply [and] sweetly". In her "D'amour l'ardente flamme", though, there was "a want of vocal warmth and a tendency to sound a shade mannered". Von Stade was better than Barenboim's Yvonne Minton, who sang with an erratic tone and a lack of emotional engagement. But she was far outclassed by Davis's Josephine Veasey, who had a surer grasp of Berliozian style and was "almost unbearably moving".

As Faust, Kenneth Riegel was more successful in his acting than in his vocalism. He was ardent in his Invocation, credible as a man on the brink of Hell and convincing in Faust's multifaceted romanticism, impetuosity and conflictedness. But his "lean" voice was less than pleasant, especially under stress, and he had formidable rivals in Davis's Nicolai Gedda and Barenboim's effortless Plácido Domingo. The most impressive of Solti's soloists was José van Dam as Satan. Although his articulation was inferior to Jules Bastin's for Davis, he had the ideal timbre for the role and sang more beautifully than either the Belgian or Barenboim's "strained" Dietrich Fischer-Dieskau. Whether imperious or insinuating, his Méphistophélès was compellingly cogent. Solti's chorus, likewise, was preferable to its competitors, outdoing them by a considerable margin. It was "more precise in attack, more refulgent in tone, more articulate in its enunciation, and it [characterized] peasants, students. follets and the rest with a keen ear for the appropriate timbre". Solti's Chicago Symphony Orchestra, however, although not inferior to Davis's London Symphony Orchestra or Barenboim's Orchestre de Paris, was not obviously better than them either.

The three conductors' own contributions to their albums were also hard to rank. Solti's reading tended to be "overtly operatic". He was triumphant in conjuring up "the empty glory and ... menace of war" in the Hungarian March and "the fever of the score's more energetic passages" in general, and he was on a par with Davis in his acid, ominous Evocation, in the trauma of Marguerite's Romance and in his "care over the peculiar timbre Berlioz [elicited] from his brass and wind". Where Davis excelled, with his special insight into Berlioz's musical personality, was in the "youthful, athletic vigour of his rhythms" and in his appreciation of the "electrifying originality of Berlioz's concept". Barenboim matched Davis in the feeling of yearning that he evoked at the beginning of Act 2, but, like Solti, was guilty of some injudicious tempos.

As far as engineering was concerned, the case for Solti's album was irresistible. "Batten down the hatches," Blyth wrote, "send your neighbours away on holiday, then take out this new version of Damnation to give your hi-fi an evening out. This is a recording of quite startling range and depth." Until he had heard Solti's discs, he would never have imagined that a recording of the work could give listeners such an overwhelming sense that they were experiencing Berlioz's music from a seat in the orchestra stalls. In sum, the collective strength of Davis's soloists gave his album a slight edge over Solti's as an interpretation, but the "sheer impact", "immediacy and presence" of Solti's entertaining and uplifting version were such that some listeners would prefer it.

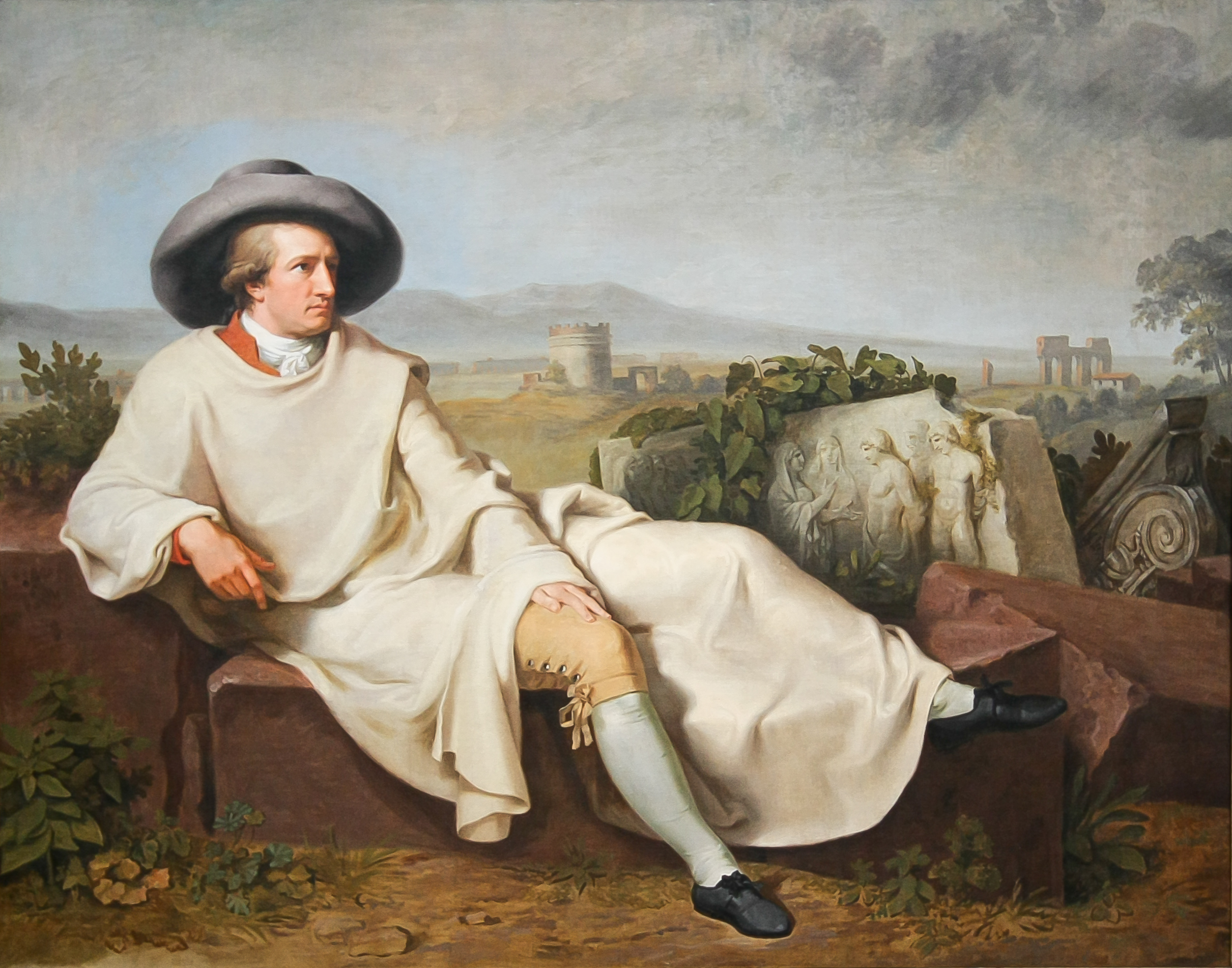
Johann Heinrich Wilhelm Tischbein's painting of Goethe on his tour of Italy

John Rockwell reviewed the album on LP in The New York Times on 27 June 1982. Frederica von Stade, he wrote, was a "heart-rending" Marguerite. Kenneth Riegel's voice sometimes sounded uncomfortable, and his name would not attract collectors in the way that Nicolai Gedda's or Plácido Domingo's would. But his Faust had to be "the performance of his lifetime thus far - direct, ardent, intelligent". José van Dam was a "chilling, godlike Méphistophélès". Both the chorus and the orchestra were superb. Georg Solti's conducting had often been accused of several misdemeanours - a neglect of minutiae, an inadequate grasp of the architecture of the most challenging works and a degree of anonymity. But in this instance, he had nothing to fear from comparisons with Colin Davis or Daniel Barenboim. His handling of Berlioz's "delicate, elfin" sections was "remarkable", and he invested the album's most thrilling passages with a Teutonic seriousness that was fitting for music inspired by Goethe. Decca's audio quality was sumptuous.

J. B. Steane reviewed the album on LP in Gramophone in July 1982. "I'm afraid that once again", he wrote, "I was deaf to the faults of Frederica von Stade: the private, haunted tone of the Ballade and the tragic maturity of the Romance seemed to me things of very great beauty". Kenneth Riegel was a "vividly anxious" Faust with a voice that was undaunted by the challenges of the role's elevated tessitura even if its tone lacked the inherent loveliness of Plácido Domingo's. José van Dam's Méphistophélès was excellent too, and the Chicago Symphony Orchestra played with "sheer brilliance". Georg Solti's conducting was equally triumphant in every episode of Berlioz's narrative. Emotional passages were invested with a "sustained depth of feeling", solemn moments with a profundity that had rarely been rivalled and exciting scenes with a "sharpness of rhythm" and a "marvellously taut vitality". The album as a whole was a "tremendous energizer".

Eric Salzman reviewed the album on LP in Stereo Review in December 1982. Frederica von Stade, he wrote, was "very subdued" in "Le roi de Thulé", but livened up in her subsequent duet and Romance. Kenneth Riegel's vocal limitations became impossible to overlook at one or two especially testing moments, but his portrait of Faust was "musical and passionate and [achieved] real heroic-tragic stature". José van Dam was the best of the soloists, delivering a straightforward Méphistophélès who was, however incongruously, sympathetic. All three singers were poor in their diction, presenting a "mealy-mouthed mumble" instead of accurate French. But the album as a whole was nevertheless at least as good as even the best of its predecessors. "It crackles! It insinuates! ... It flashes with colour and emotion. ... It has chills. Thrills. You'll laugh. You'll cry. What a story! ... What beauty! ... What music!! And it rejoiced in "dazzling, full-colour digital recording, which [captured] every thrill and chill to perfection".

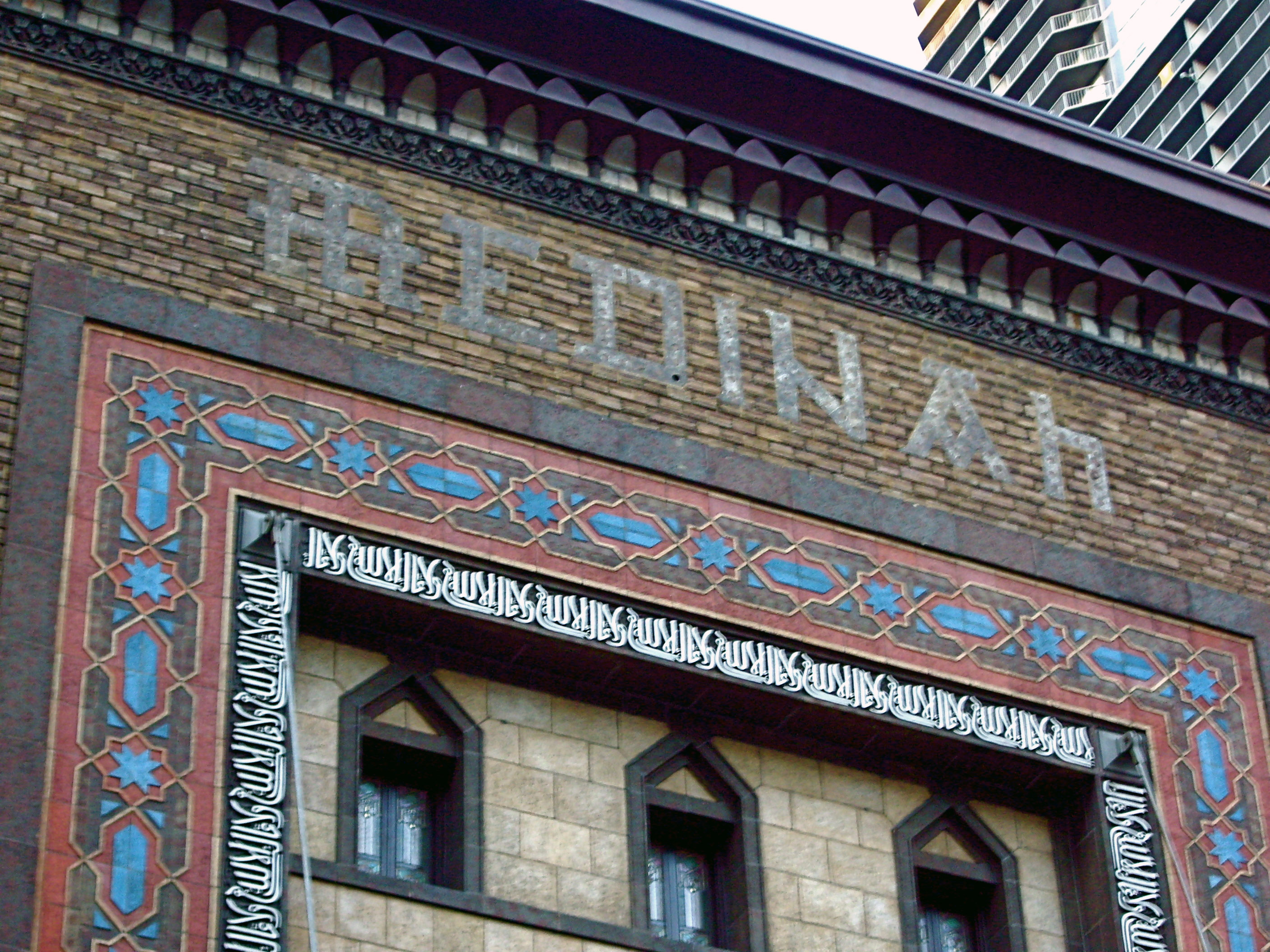
Part of Chicago's Medinah Temple's Moorish Revival façade

Geoffrey Horn, an expert in high fidelity audio, reviewed the album in Gramophone in April 1984. Record collectors had come to expect exceptionally sound quality from albums that had been taped in Chicago's Medinah Temple, he wrote, and Georg Solti's La damnation de Faust would not disappoint them. The Chicago Symphony Chorus in particular had been recorded with a fidelity that was something to marvel at. Listening to the album was very like experiencing the work in a concert hall. The album's version of the Hungarian March would no doubt be used as a demonstration track by retailers wanting to show their customers what digital recording technology was now capable of.

The Berlioz specialist John Warrack reviewed the album on CD in Gramophone in March 1990, comparing it to other versions conducted by Colin Davis and Sir John Eliot Gardiner. Frederica von Stade's Marguerite he thought "a touch on the operatic side" compared with Davis's Josephine Veasey's. Kenneth Riegel was not even within hailing distance of Davis's Nicolai Gedda as Faust. Georg Solti's José van Dam, though, was a better Méphistophélès than Davis's Jules Bastin. Solti's conducting was stimulating - he made the Hungarian March "a compulsively exhilarating experience" - but the price of his many thrills was that the score's "wonderful variety of mood and pace and colour" was not served as well as it should have been.

=== Accolades ===
The album was rated by Stereo Review as one of the best recordings of its month of issue. It was nominated for a Grammy award for the Best Classical Album of 1982. It won the Grammy award for Best Choral Performance (other than opera) in the same year. Additionally, the album received the 1982 Grand Prix du Disque for Choral Music.

== Track listing, CD 1 ==
Hector Berlioz (1803-1869)

La damnation de Faust (Paris, 1846), with a text by Berlioz, Almire Gandonnière and Gérard de Nerval, after Johann Wolfgang von Goethe

Part One: Plains of Hungary

Scene 1

- 1 (6:17) Introduction: "Le vieil hiver a fait place au printemps!" (Faust)

Scene 2

- 2 (3:39) Ronde des paysans: "Les bergers quittent leurs trompeaux" (Faust, Chorus)

Scene 3

- 3 (0:55) "Mais d'un éclat guerrier les campagnes se parent" (Faust)
- 4 (4:47) Marche hongroise

Part Two: Northern Germany

Scene 4

- 5 (5:13) "Sans regrets j'ai quitté les riantes campagnes" (Faust)
- 6 (7:39) Chant de la fête de Paques: "Christ vien de ressusciter" (Chorus, Faust)

Scene 5

- 7 (2:18) "O pure émotion! Enfant du saint parvis!" (Méphistophélès, Faust)

Scene 6

- 8 (0:25) "À boire encor! du vin" (Chorus, Méphistophélès)
- 9 (2:16) Chœur de buveurs: "Oh! qu'il fait bon" (Chorus, Brander)
- !0 (2:16) Chanson de Brander: "Certain rat, dans une cuisine" (Brander, Chorus, Méphistophélès)
- 11 (2:40) Fugue sur le thème de la chanson de Brander: "Amen" (Brander, Chorus, Méphistophélès)
- 12 (3:53) Chanson de Méphistophélès: "Une puce gentile" (Méphistophélès, Chorus, Faust)

Scene 7

- 13 (2:31) Air de Méphistophélès: "Voici des roses" (Méphistophélès)
- 14 (6:18) Chœur de gnomes et de sylphs: "Dors! Dors! heureux Faust" (Chorus, Faust, Méphistophélès)
- 15 (3:41) Ballet des sylphs (Faust, Méphistophélès)

Scene 8

- 16 (1:30) Chœur des soldats: "Villes entourées de murs et remparts" (Chorus)
- 17 (1:06) Chanson d'étudiants: "Jam nox stellate" (Chorus)
- 18 (2:15) Chœur des soldats et chanson des étudiants (Chorus, Faust, Méphistophélès)

== Track listing, CD 2 ==
Part Three: Marguerite's room

Scene 9

- 1 (1:07) Tambours et trompettes sonnant la retraite
- 2 (5:18) Air de Faust: "Merci, doux crépuscule!" (Faust)

Scene 10

- 3 (1:02) "Je l'entends" (Méphistophélès, Faust)

Scene 11

- 4 (2:55) "Que l'air est étouffant!" (Marguerite)
- 5 (4:50) Le roi de Thulé (chanson gothique): "Autrefois un roi de Thulé" (Marguerite)

Scene 12

- 6 (2:04) Evocation: "Esprits des flammes inconstantes" (Méphistophélès)
- 7 (5:48) Menuet des follets (Méphistophélès)
- 8 (2:04) Sérénade de Méphistophélès et chœur de follets: "Devant la maison" (Méphistophélès, Chorus)

Scene 13

- 9 (5:09) Duo: "Grands Dieux" (Marguerite, Faust)

Scene 14

- 10 (5:04) Trio et chœur: "Allons, il est trop tard!" (Méphistophélès, Marguerite, Faust, Chorus)

Part Four: North Germany, the Abyss and Heaven

Scene 15

- 11 (10:44) Romance de Marguerite: "D'amour l'ardente flamme" (Marguerite, Chorus)

Scene 16

- 12 (4:02) Invocation à la nature: "Nature immense, impénétrable et fière" (Faust)

Scene 17

- 13 (3:04) Récitatif et chasse: "À la voûte azure" (Méphistophélès, Faust)

Scene 18

- 14 (3:36) La course à l'abîme: "Dans mon cœur retentit sa voix" (Faust, Chorus, Méphistophélès)

Scene 19

- 15 (4:01) Pandaemonium: "Ha! Irimiru Karabrao!" (Chorus, Méphistophélès)
- 16 (1:11) Epilogue sur la terre: "Alors, l'enfer se tut" (Chorus)

Scene 20

- 17 (5:13) Dans le ciel: "Laus! Laus! Hosanna! Hosanna!" (Chorus)

== Personnel ==
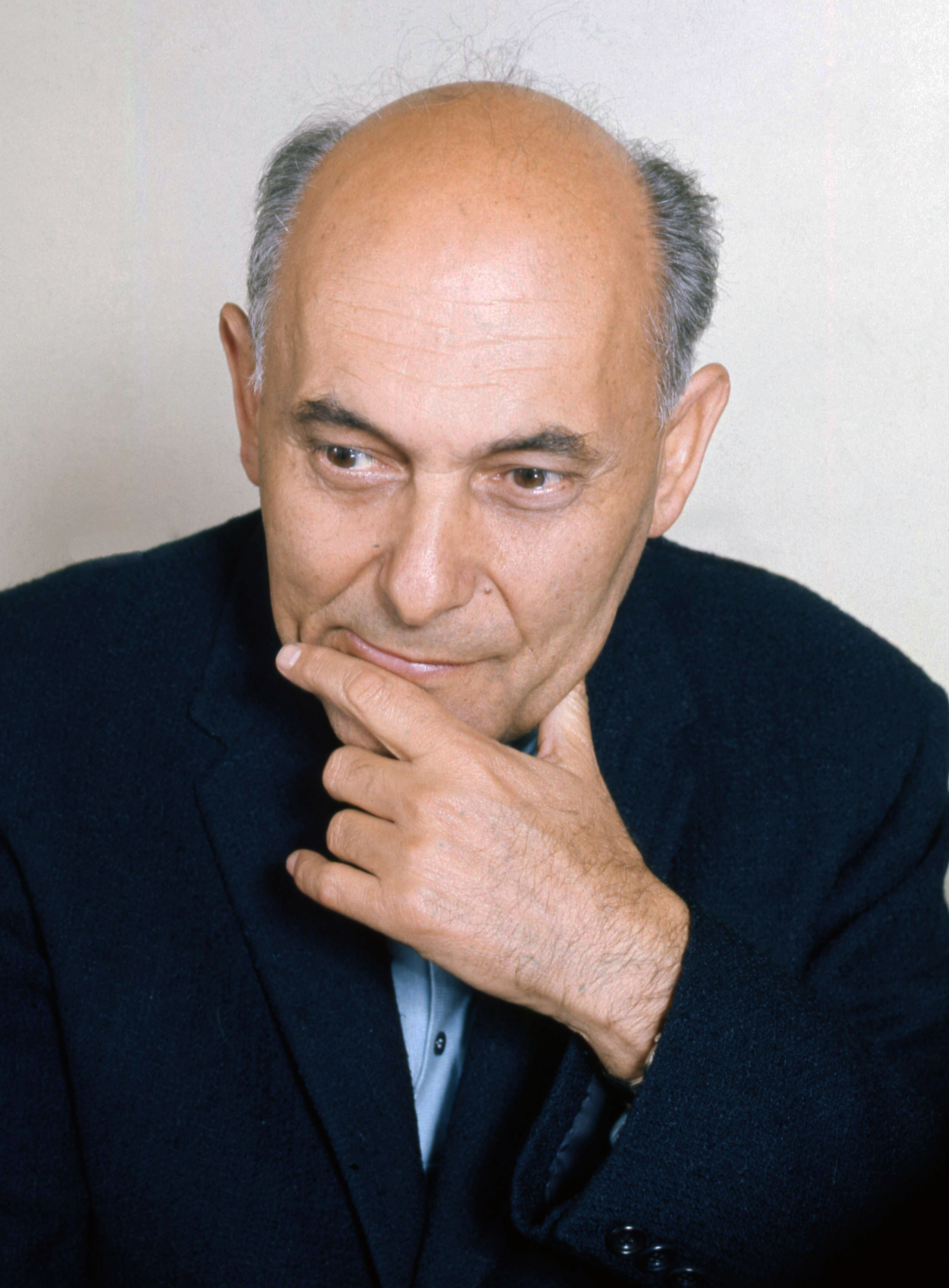
Sir Georg Solti in 1975

=== Musical ===
- Frederica von Stade (mezzo-soprano) as Marguerite, a young woman
- Kenneth Riegel (tenor) as Faust, an aging scholar
- José van Dam (bass) as Méphistophélès, the Devil disguised as a gentleman
- Malcolm King (bass) as Brander, a student
- Glen Ellyn Children's Chorus
- Chorus of the Chicago Symphony Orchestra
- Chicago Symphony Orchestra
- Margaret Hillis, chorus mistress
- Georg Solti (1912–1997), conductor

=== Other ===
- James Mallinson, producer
- James Lock, engineer
- Simon Eadon, engineer

== Release history ==
In 1982, Decca and London released the album as a triple LP with a booklet of texts, translations and notes (catalogue numbers D259D3 in Europe and LDR 73007 in the US). Decca also released the album on cassette (catalogue number Decca K259K32).

In 1984, Decca and London released excerpts from the album on CD (catalogue number Decca and London 410 181-2) with a 36-page booklet of texts and translations. In 1986, Decca and London released the entire album on CD (catalogue number Decca and London 414 680-2) with a 100-page booklet supplying texts, translations and notes by Hugh Macdonald. In 1996, London issued the album on CD in Japan (catalogue number London POCL 4123-4) In 1997, Decca issued the album on CD in France on their Opéra Rouge label (catalogue number Decca 455 826-2).
