= Stjepan Šulek =

Croatian composer and violinist

Stjepan Šulek (5 August 1914 in Zagreb, Austria-Hungary – 16 January 1986 in Zagreb, SR Croatia, SFR Yugoslavia) was a Croatian composer, conductor, violinist and music teacher.

== Biography ==
Born in Zagreb in 1914, Šulek began his music study very early by learning piano, violin, and composition. In 1936 he received his diploma from the Zagreb Academy of Music, where he studied violin with Vaclav Huml (1880–1953) and composition with Blagoje Bersa (1873–1934), the founder of Croatian modern music movements. Until 1952 Šulek was an active soloist who gave numerous recitals. He was also an active chamber music performer of the highest level, as he was the first violin of the Zagreb String Quartet from 1936 to 1938 and was a member of the Maček-Šulek-Janigro Trio from 1939 to 1945. At the Zagreb Conservatorium, Šulek began teaching violin in 1939, composition in 1948, and orchestration in 1953.

His works were played on a national and international level beginning in 1945 in Europe, South America, and the United States. Šulek became a corresponding member of the Croatian Academy of the Arts and Sciences in 1948 and an official member and secretary of the Department of Music for the academy in 1954. He launched a successful conducting career in building up an international reputation for the Chamber Orchestra of the Zagreb (now Croatian) Radio and Television. From 1958 to 1964 he was the principal conductor of both the chamber and symphony orchestras of Zagreb and undertook numerous European tours with these orchestras. He was frequently invited to be a guest conductor for the symphony orchestras of Zagreb, Belgrade, and Slovenia.

In his teaching career, Šulek was a professor of musical composition and mentor of many Croatian composers. his students including Milko Kelemen, Stanko Horvat, Krešimir Šipuš, Sandro Zaninović, Pavle Dešpalj, Dubravko Detoni, Igor Kuljerić etc.

Šulek died in Zagreb in 1986.

== Compositions ==
=== Symphonies ===
- First Symphony (1944)
- Second Symphony "Eroica" (1946)
- Third Symphony (1948)
- Fourth Symphony (1954)
- Fifth Symphony (1964)
- Sixth Symphony (1966)
- Seventh Symphony (1979)
- Eighth Symphony (1981)
- Epitaf (1971)
- Runke (1972)

=== Concertos ===
- First Piano Concerto (1949)
- Second Piano Concerto (1952)
- Third Piano Concerto (1970)
- Cello Concerto (1950)
- Violin Concerto in D minor (1951)
- Bassoon Concerto (1958)
- Viola Concerto (1959)
- Horn Concerto (1972)
- Organ Concerto "Memento" (1974)
- Clarinet Concerto (1970)

=== "Classical Concertos" ===
- First Classical Concerto, for orchestra (1944)
- Second Classical Concerto, for strings (1952)
- Third Classical Concerto, for strings (1957)
- Fourth Classical Concerto, for orchestra (1983)

=== Sonatas ===
- First Piano Sonata (1947)
- Second Piano Sonata (1978)
- Third Piano Sonata (1980)
- Sonata for Trombone and Piano "Vox Gabrieli" (1973)
- Sonata for Cello and Piano (1974)
- Sonata for Violin and Piano

=== Chamber music ===
- Ten string quartets
- Piano Sextet (1957)

=== Operas ===
- Koriolan (1957)
- Oluja (Storm) (1969)

=== Ballets ===
- De Veritate (1977)

=== Choir ===
- Bašćanska ploča (Bašhka Stone Etchings) (1980)

=== Cantatas ===
- Zadnji Adam (The Last Adam) (1964)

=== Song cycles ===
- Singing of the Dead Poet (1970)
- Strah (Fear) (1975)

=== Guitar ===
- The Troubadours Three
  1. Melancholy
  2. Sonnet
  3. Celebration

== Bibliography ==
- Supičić, Ivan (1987). Stjepan Šulek: 1914–1986. Zagreb: Razred za glazbenu umjetnost i muzikologiju. OCLC 46009587.
