= Igor Kuljerić =

Croatian composer and conductor

Igor Kuljerić (February 1, 1938 – April 20, 2006) was an important Croatian composer and conductor. His large opus followed the stylistic changes and evolutions of 20th and 21st century music.

== Biography ==
Born in the coastal city of Šibenik on the Adriatic Sea, Kuljerić graduated in composition from Zagreb Academy of Music and received a grant from the Italian government to study opera repertoire at La Scala in Milan, Italy. Attracted by the new movements in contemporary music, he participated in the experiments held in the Studio di fonologia musicale (Studio for musical phonology) at RAI with Luigi Nono and in Monte Carlo with Igor Markevitch. From 1960 to 1967 he served as the rehearsal and assistant conductor of the Opera of Croatian National Theater in Zagreb and later became a member of the famed I Solisti di Zagreb ensemble as harpsichordist and assistant to the director Antonio Janigro. His conducting debut in 1967 during the Zagreb soloists' tour in the United States, followed by positive reviews in the New York and Boston press led to his permanent appointment as conductor at Croatian Radiotelevision. From 1968 till the early '80s he served as the conductor of Croatian Radio Television Chorus and the Croatian Radio Television Symphony Orchestra. Kuljerić has held many important positions in Croatian cultural institutions, including music directorships of Dubrovnik Summer Festival, Croatian National Theatre, Vatroslav Lisinski Concert Hall Series and Music Biennale Zagreb festival of contemporary music. Kuljerić was also active giving performances abroad in such countries as the United States, the former USSR, Spain, Italy, and Austria.

He established himself early as one of the most frequently performed Croatian composers, his pieces becoming part of the repertoire of many orchestras, chamber ensembles, and soloists.

His student works, Symphonic Variations, Concert Ouverture, Concerto for French Horn and Orchestra, and Two Ballet Suites... owe much to academic influences while speaking of the young composer's particular talents and inventiveness.

After graduation Kuljerić felt intrigued by the new expressive and experimental musical tools that had become available. At that time Zagreb Biennale Music Festival of Contemporary Music was at the forefront of international avant garde movement hosting all of the important composers, musical writers, and performers. Some of the works from that period include Figurazioni Con Tromba for trumpets and orchestra, Solo-Tutti for piano and orchestra, Impulsi II for string quartet, Ballads of Petrica Kerempuh for orchestra and choirs, Folk-Art tape music (performed as contemporary dance music), Les Echos I for chamber orchestra, and Les Echos II for jazz band and symphony orchestra.

Kuljerić felt definitive limitations of the avant-garde movement in the beginning of the '80s with its aesthetics not allowing him further development of his musical ideas. He investigated the deeper layers of his musical heritage with many references—direct and indirect—to Croatian folk music and tradition, trying to incorporate the positive experiences of musical avant-garde. Since then his output demonstrated a desire to write in a more direct and communicative style, reflecting the questioning of modernist theories and practice.

Many of these features can be found in his Risuono Di Gavotta and Chorale Ouverture for symphony orchestra, Alleluia and Pater Noster for piano trio, the Waltz for chamber ensemble, Concertpiece for Flutes and Orchestra, Chopin Op. 7 No. 4 for vibes and flute, Concerto for Marimba and Orchestra, Barocchiana for marimba and strings, Riky Levi, a ballet that premiered in 1991 in Sarajevo, with a later orchestra suite version, Five Movements from the Ballet Riky Levi).

A special part of Kuljerić's opus references national musical roots and religious practice, Croatian glagolitic heritage, and historical artistic practice (Renaissance poetry and Baroque music) and can be found in Quam Pulchra Es (Ommaggio A Kukacic), Sea (More) for a girls choir, Song for string quartet, Cross Give Us Mercy (Krizu daj nam to milosti) for men's choir, Kanconijer for voices and instruments, and Croatian Glagolitic Requiem a monolithic work for soloists, choir, and orchestra written on an ancient Croatian glagolitic text of the Catholic mass (the live in concert recording CD published by Cantus – four nominations for PORIN – the most important Croatian discographic award) and Croatian Mass.

Kuljerić composed a great deal of film and incidental music, arrangements and crossover projects with famous Croatian pop and rock stars, music for sport events, and television jingles and commercials. He insisted on the freedom to explore various musical styles and forms, searching for a fusion that would reach the contemporary audience and communicate the present human situation. Thus he was attracted to stage drama and authored three operas:

- The Power of Virtue (Moc vrline) premiered in 1977 at the Croatian National Theater in Zagreb. Written in avant-garde style, the work speaks about evil times in which witch hunts occur, when collective hysteria becomes the source of individual suffering. The opera was awarded an INA award.
- Richard III, based on Shakespeare's drama, premiered in 1987 at Zagreb's Croatian National Theater. The mechanism of the crimes that rule over human history and govern human destinies are the crucial themes of this opera.
- The Animal Farm opera fable based on George Orwell's novel. It premiered at the 2003 Music Biennale Zagreb in the Vatroslav Lisinski Concert Hall as a joint commission by Music Biennale Zagreb, Vatroslav Lisinski Concert Hall, and Croatian Radiotelevision. The music combines traditional elements of opera and the modern music hall, using the technique of "persiflage" on the melodic-harmonic-rhythmic patterns of the music of consumer society (S. Reich's reference to "street music") and integrating them into an individual musical language. It is a familiar process to composers throughout the history of Western music.

Kuljerić's most recent works include Pop Concert for trumpet and orchestra, Folk Art for marimba and string quartet, and Milonga Para Victor Borges for cello ensemble.

Kuljerić was the recipient of UNESCO Award and many important Croatian awards. In 2004 he was admitted in the Croatian Academy of Arts and Sciences.

Death

Kuljerić died in April 2006, only three weeks following the completion and premiere of his Hrvatska Misa (Croatian Mass), a monumental composition scored for soloists, chorus, and orchestra. The work on his new opera, Catherine of Zrin (Katarina Zrinska) featuring the heroine in a historical drama on love and politics, is unfinished.

== See also ==
- Music of Croatia

Preceded by (Switzerland) Benoit Kaufman	Eurovision Song Contest conductor 1990	Succeeded by (Italy) Bruno Canfora
