= Alfredo Rossi Vezzani =

Italian pianist (1906–1986)

- Born: Alfredo Rossi Vezzani; 15 August 1906; Milan, Italy
- Died: 5 September 1986 (aged 80) Adrogué, Argentina
- Genre: Classical music
- Occupation: Pianist

Alfredo Rossi Vezzani (15 August 1906 – 5 September 1986) was an Italian pianist who specialized in chamber music and was notably famous in his time as an accompanist to solo artists.

== Biography ==
From an early age, he studied piano with his mother, Gisella Vezzani. At the age of 6, he was presented to a contest at the Giuseppe Verdi Conservatory in Milan and obtained a scholarship to continue his studies. In the Conservatory studied piano with the teacher Vincenzo Appiani, finishing the studies in July 1925. Later he studied composition in the same Conservatory, under the direction of the teacher Arrigo Pedrollo, finishing in 1931. He won the first prize of the conservatory and the famous titles "Durini" and "Erba". He also won the first prize of the Interprovincial Lombard Union of the Musician Contest. He completed further studies with Nicola Janigro, father of the famous cellist Antonio Janigro. Precisely, accompanying Antonio Janigro began to give his first concerts, and curiously, in his first presentations also accompanied his brothers Umberto Rossi (cellist) and Eliane Rossi (soprano).

At the end of World War II, he joined the Chamber Orchestra of Milan, directed by Michelangelo Abbado. He had great success in Spain, which opened the doors to start gigging in this country, both soloist and as an accompanist.

In Madrid, he met his future wife, Andrea Miguel Llorente, with whom he had two children, Lucia and Roberto.

After offering some successful concerts in Brazil accompanying Pierre Fournier, he warned that he would have better job opportunities in South America. He decided to settle in Buenos Aires, Argentina, a city to which his mother and three of his sisters had emigrated earlier. In the Port of Barcelona on March 30, 1951, he sailed with his family aboard the transatlantic Conte Bianacamano, disembarking on April 14, 1951, in Buenos Aires, where he definitely established.

== Chamber music ==
Artistically, he specialized in chamber music and tried, through teaching, to promote the development of this speciality. In his own words, he was not an accompanist for soloists but was part of chamber duos.

== Teaching ==
He was professor of piano in the following conservatories:

- Conservatory "Giuseppe Verdi", Milan, Italy
- Istituto Superiore di Studi Musicali "Gaetano Donizetti", Bergamo, Italy
- Conservatory "Beethoven", Buenos Aires, Argentina
- Conservatorio Superior de Música "Manuel de Falla", Buenos Aires, Argentina.
- Conservatory "Juan José Castro", La Lucila, Buenos Aires, Argentina

== Travel ==
In addition to concerts in his native country, he gave concerts in many countries, among others:

- Argentina: Buenos Aires, La Plata, Adrogué, Córdoba, Tucumán, Santa Fé, Mar del Plata, Bahía Blanca, Paraná, Mendoza, Punta Alta, San Rafael, Concordia, Campana, Mercedes.
- Belgium: Liège.
- Brazil: São Paulo, Río de Janeiro, Recife, Niterói, Salvador de Bahía, Pernambuco, Curitiba, Porto Alegre, Belém, Sergipe, Ponta Grossa, João Pessoa, São Luís.
- Chile: Santiago de Chile, Valparaíso, Viña del Mar.
- China: Macau.
- Colombia: Bogotá.
- Croatia: Zagreb.
- Cuba: Havana, Santiago de Cuba.
- Curaçao: Willemstad.
- Ecuador: Quito.
- France: Paris.
- Germany: Berlin, Essen, Barmen, Wiesbaden
- Gibraltar
- Guatemala: Guatemala City.
- Hong Kong
- Japan: Osaka, Kōchi, Matsuyama, Miyazaki, Tokyo.
- India: Mumbai.
- Iran: Tehran.
- Italy: Milan, Siena, Brescia, Bolzano, Turin, Trieste, Bari, Rome, Lodi, Venice, Catania.
- Malaysia: Penang.
- Mexico: Mexico City, Monterrey.
- Netherlands: The Hague, Amsterdam.
- Paraguay: Asunción.
- Peru: Lima.
- Portugal: Lisboa, Oporto.
- Singapore
- Spain: Madrid, Barcelona, Valencia, Zaragoza, Cádiz, Girona, Terrassa, Sabadell, Bilbao, Pamplona, Vitoria-Gasteiz, Santander, San Sebastián, A Coruña, Oviedo, Gijón, Pontevedra, Badajoz, Málaga, Valladolid, Tarragona, Vigo, Lugo, Ourense, Alicante, Granada.
- Thailand: Bangkok.
- Uruguay: Montevideo.
- Venezuela: Maracay.
- Vietnam: Saigon.

== Related artists ==
He accompanied famous artists of his time, such as: Antonio Janigro, Pierre Fournier, Guila Bustabo, Michelangelo Abbado, Xavier Turull, Victoria de los Ángeles, Montserrat Caballé, Elisabeth Schwarzkopf, Georg Kulenkampff, Virginia Paris, Dimitry Markevitch, Mascia Predit, Gaspar Cassadó, Bernard Michelin, Eva Heinitz, Váša Příhoda, Franco Gulli, Wanda Luzzato, Sirio Piovesan, Alfredo Campoli, Ida Haendel, Enrico Mainardi, Cesare Ferraresi, Riccardo Brengola, André Navarra, Camilla Wicks, Ivry Gitlis, Renato de Barbieri, Ruggiero Ricci, Ricardo Odnoposoff, Noemí Souza, Gloria Davy, Isaac José Weinstein, Erno Valasek, Ruben Varga, Janine Andrade, Peter-Lukas Graf, Simón Bajour, Anahí Carfi, Christian Ferras, Carmela Saghy, Lawrence Winters, Agustín León Ara, Uto Ughi, McHenry Boatwright, among others.

== Recordings ==
- Montserrat Caballé at the Teatro Colón. Franz Schubert, Richard Strauss, Claude Debussy, Enrique Granados and Joaquín Rodrigo. 11 September 1965, Teatro Colón, Buenos Aires, Argentina (EKR CD P2 Eklipse).
- Ludwig Hoelscher / Bernard Michelin: TBS Vintage Classics. Henry Eccles, Manuel de Falla and Camille Saint-Saëns, 29 May 1960, Osaka ABC Hall, Japan.
- Poesías de Juana de Ibarbourou. Beethoven, Fauré, Grieg, Prokofiev, Ravel, Schubert and Szymanowski. Voices: Inda Ledesma & Iris Marga. Music: Anahi Carfi & Alfredo Rossi. 19 June 1972. Disco GPE 1004. Editorial Aguilar Argentina. Buenos Aires.
- Victoria de los Ángeles canta a Nin. Concert collection of Victoria de los Ángeles with various pianists. Alfredo Rossi performed with her "Canço de Nadal", recorded in Montevideo, Uruguay, 1954. World premiere recordings.
