= Mario Brunello =

Italian cellist and musician

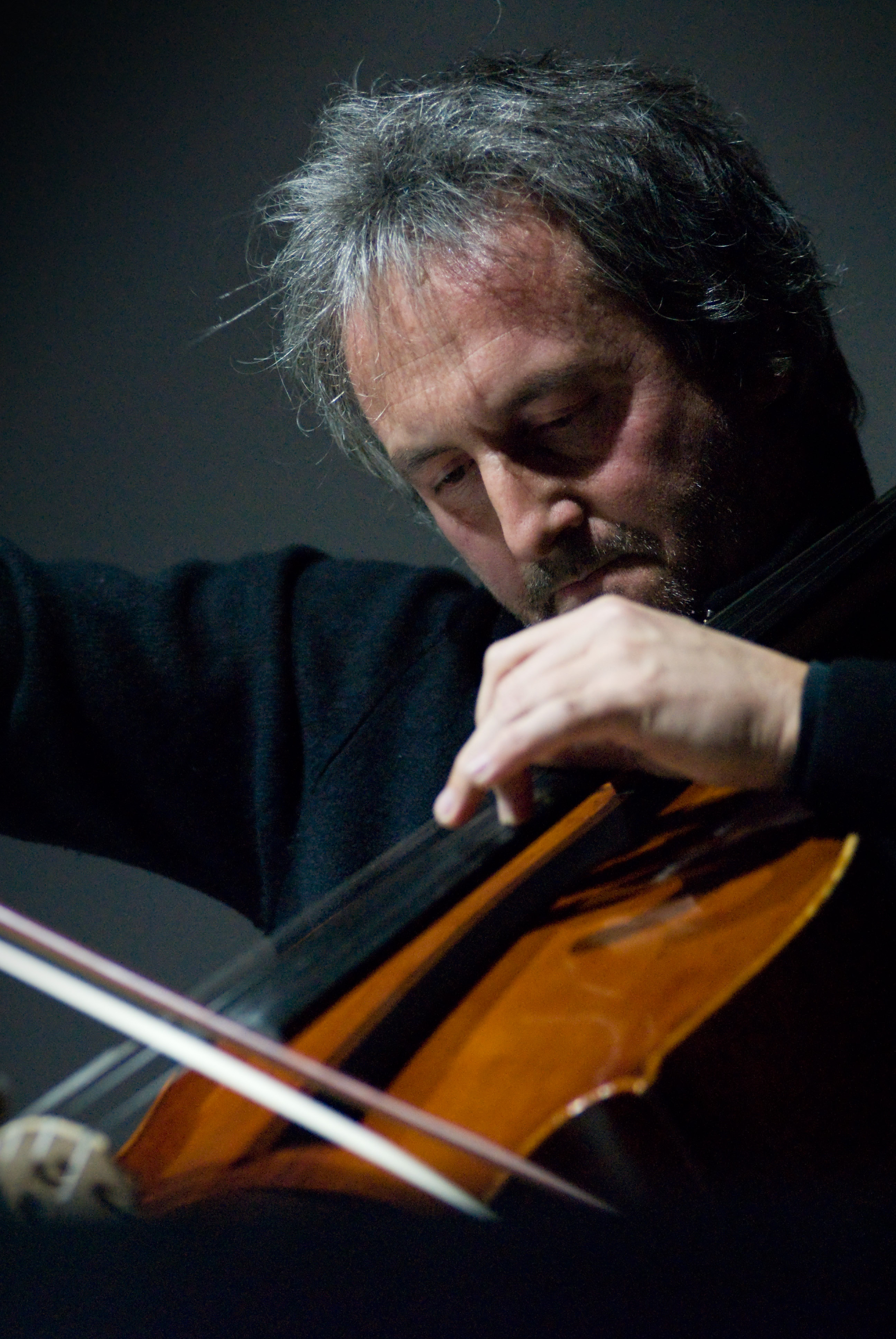
Mario Brunello in 2007

Mario Brunello (born 1960) is an Italian cellist and musician, who is currently Artistic Director of the International String Quartet Competition Premio Paolo Borciani and of the Reggio Emilia String Quartet Festival. Brunello plays a 17th-century Maggini cello which, in the 20th century, belonged to Benedetto Mazzacurati and then to Franco Rossi, cellist of the "Quartetto Italiano". He has played with many orchestras internationally and has performed with various artists.

== Life and career ==
=== Origins and musical beginnings ===
Brunello was born in Castelfranco Veneto, Italy. He studied under Adriano Vendramelli of the Venice Conservatorio of Music and of Antonio Janigro. In 1986, he was awarded the first prize at the International Tchaikovsky Competition, Moscow, in the cello section.

In 1994, Brunello founded the "Orchestra d'Archi Italiana" (Italian String Orchestra), starting a double performing activities as a conductor in addition to that of soloist and touring in many European countries.

=== Later career ===
Since then Brunello has played with the many orchestras in the world: London Philharmonic, Royal Philharmonic, Munich Philharmonic, Philadelphia Orchestra, Orchestre National de France, NHK Symphony Orchestra (Tokyo), Scala Philharmonic Orchestra, Santa Cecilia, only to name a few, and under conductors such as Valery Gergiev, Zubin Mehta, Riccardo Muti, Yuri Temirkanov, Riccardo Chailly, Ton Koopman, Seiji Ozawa, Daniele Gatti, Myung-Whun Chung and Claudio Abbado.

As a chamber musician Brunello has performed with artists, including Gidon Kremer, Martha Argerich, Frank Peter Zimmermann, Yuri Bashmet, Maurizio Pollini, Andrea Lucchesini, Valery Afanassiev and the Borodin and Alban Berg Quartets.

== Discography ==
- 2010 - Mario Brunello - Bach - sei suites a violoncello solo senza basso - brunello series EGEA - Recorded at Auditorium Santa Cecilia - Perugia - Italy - 2009.
- 2009 - Mario Brunello - cello / Andrea Lucchesini - piano - Lekeu, Sonata for cello and piano in F major - Schubert, Sonata for Arpeggione and piano in A minor D.821 - brunello series EGEA - Recorded at Auditorium Scuola Comunale Chiappano (Vicenza) - Italy - 2004
- 2009 - Mario Brunello - Antonio Vivaldi - CONCERTI PER VIOLONCELLO - brunello series EGEA
- 2009 - Mario Brunello - VIOLONCELLO AND - brunello series - Recorded at Chiesa Monastica del Monastero di Bose (Italy) 25-27 October 2004
- 2008 - Mario Brunello / orchestra d'archi italiana - Odusia - brunello series - Recorded at Auditorium Santa Cecilia (Perugia) - Italy
- 2002 - XRCD2 Mario Brunello Alone (JVC) Sollima - Ligeti - Casado
- 1999 - Mario Brunello, cello / Andrea Lucchesini, piano - Chopin, Schumann, Brahms - Accademia Musicale Chigiana - Recorded at Teatro dei Rozzi (Siena) - Italy - August 9-11 & September 16-18 1999
- 1998 - Mario Brunello, cello / Andrea Lucchesini, piano - Beethoven - Complete works for cello & piano - Agorà Musica - Recorded at Palazzo Giusti (Padua) - Italy - May 21-26 1996
- 1995 – Mario Brunello, cello - Bach - Sei suites per violoncello solo - Amadeus - Recorded at Conservatorio di Torino - Italy- January/April 1993 / December 9 1994
- 1993 – Mario Brunello, cello / I Solisti di Zagabria, orchestra - Haydn - I concerti per violoncello - Erresse - Italy
