= Milko Kelemen =

Croatian composer (1924–2018)

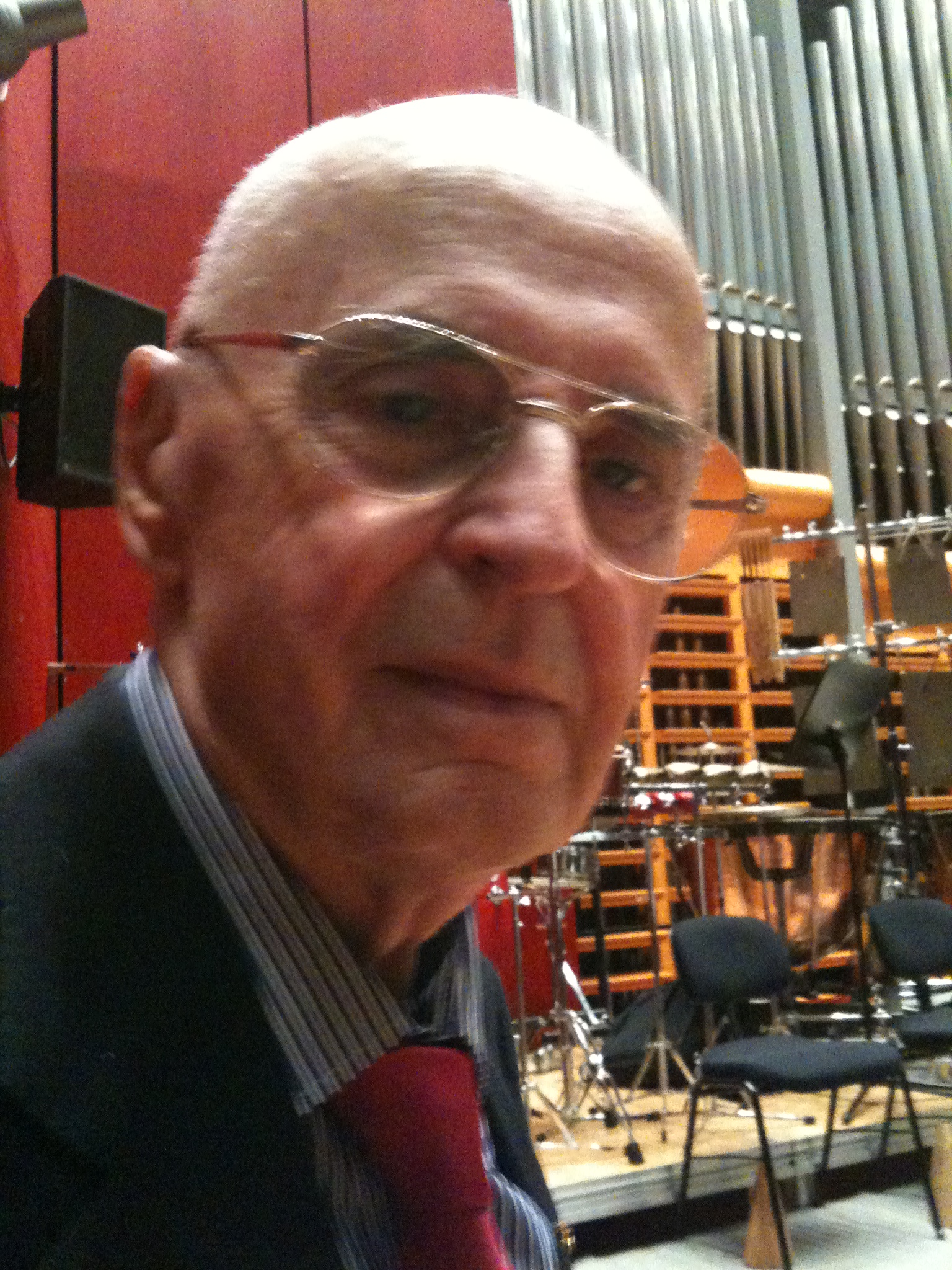
Milko Kelemen

Milko Kelemen (30 March 1924 – 8 March 2018) was a Croatian composer.

== Life ==
Milko Kelemen was born in Slatina, Croatia (then Kingdom of Serbs, Croats and Slovenes). He studied under Stjepan Šulek in Zagreb, under Olivier Messiaen in Paris and Wolfgang Fortner in Freiburg amongst others.

Kelemen founded the Music Biennale Zagreb, an international contemporary music festival and served as its president from 1961 to 1979.

He also worked at the Electronic Siemens Studio in Munich and was invited to Berlin as composer in residence.

Kelemen was a recipient of many awards, most notably the Federal Cross of Merit, the prize of the ISCM, the Great Yugoslav State Prize, and the French order Chevalier des Arts et des Lettres.

Kelemen taught composition at many prestigious schools and universities, including Zagreb University, Academy of Music, Croatia (1955-58), The Robert Schumann Institute in Düsseldorf, Germany (1970-72), Stuttgart Academy of Music, Germany (1973-89), Yale University, USA (1975-77), and Montreal University, Canada (1977-78).

Since 1973, he lived in Stuttgart, Germany, where he died. His works are published by Hans Sikorski Music Publishers.

== Selected works ==
- Koncertantne improvizacije for strings (1955)
- Three Dances for viola and string orchestra (1958)
- Études contrapuntiques for Wind Quintet (1959)
- Composé for two pianos and orchestral groups (1967)
- Der Belagerungszustant, opera, after Camus (1969-70)
- Splintery for String Quartet (1977)
- Apocalyptica - opéra bestial, multimedia ballet-opera, after Arrabal (1979)
- Phantasmen for viola and orchestra (1985)
- Requiem for Sarajevo for six cellos, narrator, and bass drum (1994)
- Archetypon II – Für Anton for large orchestra (1995)
