= Thomas Demenga =

Swiss composer and cellist

Thomas Demenga (born 12 June 1954) is a Swiss composer and cellist.

== Life and career ==
Born in Bern, Demenga studied with Walter Grimmer, Antonio Janigro, Leonard Rose and Mstislav Rostropovich and at the Juilliard School in New York, among others. He gives concerts as a chamber musician and soloist at all important festivals and music centres of the world. Since 1980, Demenga has been leading a training and soloist class at the Hochschule für Musik. From August 2001, Demenga was artistic director of the Davos Festival young artists in concert, which he directed for the last time in 2006.

At the Summer 2003 Lucerne Festival, Demenga performed as artiste étoile. An extensive series of CD recordings, published by ECM, documents his artistic work. In 2002, the last CD of his recording of Bach's solo suites in combination with works by contemporary composers Heinz Holliger, Elliott Carter, Sándor Veress, Bernd Alois Zimmermann, Isang Yun and Toshio Hosokawa was released. Several of his recordings have been awarded the Vierteljahrespreis der Deutschen Schallplattenkritik.

He performs in concerts with fellow musicians such as Heinz Holliger, Gidon Kremer, Thomas Larcher, Paul Meyer, Aurèle Nicolet, Hansheinz Schneeberger, Thomas Zehetmair and Tabea Zimmermann. Demenga has worked with conductors like Moshe Atzmon, Myung-Whun Chung, Charles Dutoit, Claus Peter Flor, Howard Griffiths, Heinz Holliger, Armin Jordan, Okko Kamu, Rostropovich, Dennis Russell Davies, Wolfgang Sawallisch, Sándor Végh, Mario Venzago and Hiroshi Wakasugi.

He devotes himself especially to Neue Musik and also deals with improvisation. Thus his own musical language as a composer and interpreter of 20th and 21st century works (including many world premieres) forms a new and complementary dimension to the historical performance practice of Baroque music and his interpretations of the classical and romantic repertoire. He also represents these interests as artistic director, since 2011, of the chamber orchestra Camerata Zürich.

In 1991, Demenga was the first Swiss composer to be awarded first prize at the International Rostrum of Composers in Paris for his work "solo per due" for two violoncellos.
