= Music Biennale Zagreb =

Music festival in Croatia

- Genre: Contemporary music
- Dates: April (odd years only)
- Locations: Zagreb, Croatia
- Years active: 1961–present
- Founders: Milko Kelemen
- Organizer: Croatian Composers' Society
- Website: www.mbz.hr

Music Biennale Zagreb (Croatian: Muzički biennale Zagreb, MBZ) is an international festival of contemporary music in Zagreb, Croatia, organized by the Croatian Composers' Society. The Biennale, founded by Milko Kelemen and held every spring of the odd years since 1961, has become one of the most important festivals of contemporary music in Europe.

== Repertoire and format ==
Throughout its history, the Biennale has given equal weight to classical 20th century repertoire and experimental music, encompassing a variety of musical forms, including symphonic and chamber concerts, opera, ballet, music theatre and multimedia performances. Accompanying lectures, workshops and symposiums are also gaining prominence in recent years. The Biennale has collaborated with some of the biggest international names in contemporary music, including Luciano Berio, John Cage, Peter Maxwell Davies, Mauricio Kagel, Witold Lutosławski, Bruno Maderna and Igor Stravinsky.

The festival gained international prominence in the 1960s and the 1970s due in large part to an ambivalent position of Yugoslavia in the political and ideological divisions of the Cold War, making it a unique gathering place for artists from both East and West. Just as its founder had hoped, it has provided a boost for Croatian composers and musicians by accelerating their integration into world trends in contemporary music, especially through co-productions and partnerships with their foreign colleagues. It has also proved popular with the concert-going public, as its events are seen by almost ten thousand people, which, according to the festival's long-time director Ivo Josipović, controverts the idea of Biennale being about a "group of freaks who pour water into a piano". The festival's popularity is partly due to symbolic ticket prices: in 2011, entrance fee for most events was 20 HRK (c. €3), while the festival pass was available for 150 HRK (€20).

Approximately 70% of the festival's funding is today provided by the Ministry of Culture and the City of Zagreb, while the rest comes through donations and the festival's own income.

In 2005 the Biennale hosted the ISCM World Music Days. It hosted the World Music Days again in 2011, coinciding with the Biennale's 50th anniversary. Croatian Post issued a commemorative postal mark in that occasion.

== History ==
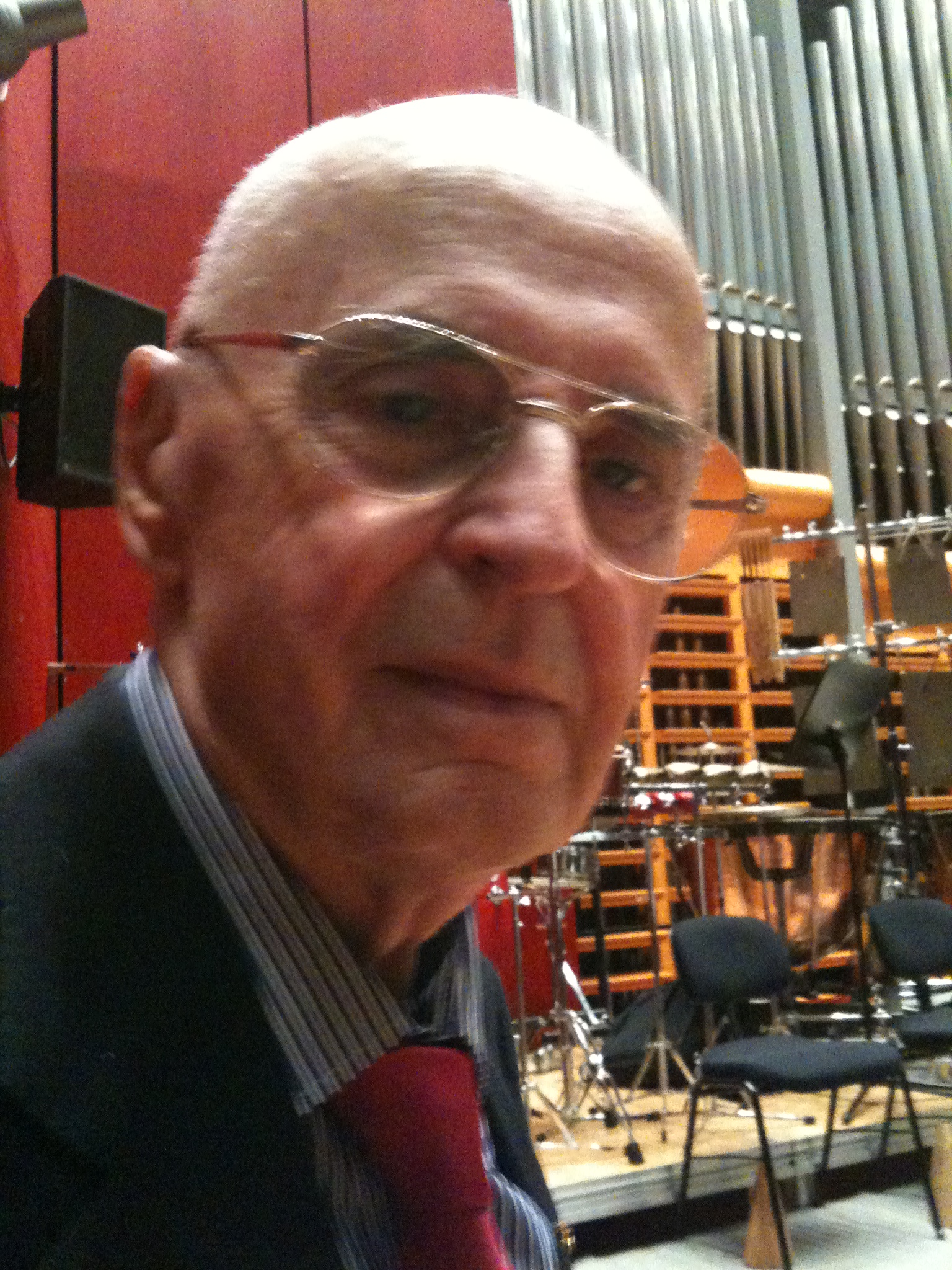
Croatian contemporary classical composer Milko Kelemen founded the Music Biennale Zagreb, served as its director from 1961 to 1979, and was later named the Biennale's honorary president.

=== The first Biennale ===
The idea to organize the Biennale came from Milko Kelemen, a Croatian contemporary classical composer. After studying composition under Olivier Messiaen in Paris in 1954, Kelemen spent some time in Darmstadt, where he was associated with the Darmstadt School. Upon returning to Zagreb, Kelemen got the impression that Croatian music was "eighty years behind", and in 1959 had an idea to organize an international festival of contemporary music. However, Zagreb Mayor Većeslav Holjevac was not interested until Kelemen threatened to organize the festival in Belgrade instead; even then, Holjevac could provide funding in domestic currency only, leaving the would-be organizers unable to pay any compensation to foreign participants.

Kelemen nevertheless had a plan. He visited Yekaterina Furtseva, Minister of Culture of the Soviet Union, and — knowing she was an ardent communist — told her that the influence of the United States and the West was getting stronger in Yugoslavia, so Soviet musicians were needed in Zagreb. She not only accepted immediately, but also agreed to cover all expenses. After that, Kelemen traveled to Washington and spoke to the State Department, this time arguing that Russian influence in Yugoslavia was very strong and that the Russians had already applied for performing in Zagreb. He asked for Americans to join in, and was again successful. Once Soviet and American participation was secured, Kelemen found that attracting the rest was "fairly easy". Still, his organizing efforts earned him two days in prison under interrogation by the Yugoslav secret police, because his frequent trips to Soviet Union and the USA were deemed suspicious. In the end, the first Biennale was a success noted even by The New York Times, which published a half-page review of the event.

=== 1960s and 1970s ===
One of the stars of the 2nd Biennale in 1963 was John Cage. Shortly before Cage was due to perform, Kelemen was warned by the authorities that any "antics" onstage such as crawling under the piano would lead to the festival being banned. Kelemen immediately relayed this to Cage, warned him about endangering the festival, and asked him to promise he would not crawl under the piano. Cage agreed, yet, as soon as his performance started, he did exactly that. This caused a sensation among the audience; according to Kelemen, "people went crazy" and gave Cage a big applause in the end. The 1963 edition also featured the world premiere of Witold Lutosławski' Trois poèmes d'Henri Michaux, commissioned for the Biennale by Slavko Zlatić, the director of the Radio Zagreb Choir, and conducted by the composer himself.

The 3rd Biennale in 1965 was visited by Karlheinz Stockhausen, Bruno Maderna, Pierre Schaeffer, and Olivier Messiaen.

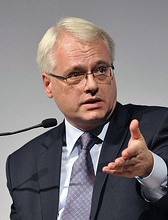
Professor of law, politician and composer Ivo Josipović was the Biennale's director from 1991 to 2010, when he assumed the office of the President of Croatia.

The 8th Biennale in 1975 was the first to feature performances in the Vatroslav Lisinski Concert Hall, a large hall and convention center that had opened in December 1973. Up to that time, the Biennale's mainstream events were held mostly in the Croatian National Theatre.

At the 10th Biennale in 1979, a performance by Tomislav Gotovac caused some controversy. On 2 May, one hundred participants at the Republic Square (today's Ban Jelačić Square), instructed by Gotovac, blew their whistles in accordance with the music score drawn in squares on the sidewalk. At one point, Gotovac unexpectedly stripped naked and started running from square to square. This was the first ever streaking act in Zagreb.

=== 1980s to present ===
In 1981, rock music was introduced to the Biennale, with a closing-night concert that featured Classix Nouveaux and Gang of Four, together with some of the most prominent Yugoslav new wave bands Električni Orgazam, Laboratorija Zvuka, Haustor, and Šarlo Akrobata.

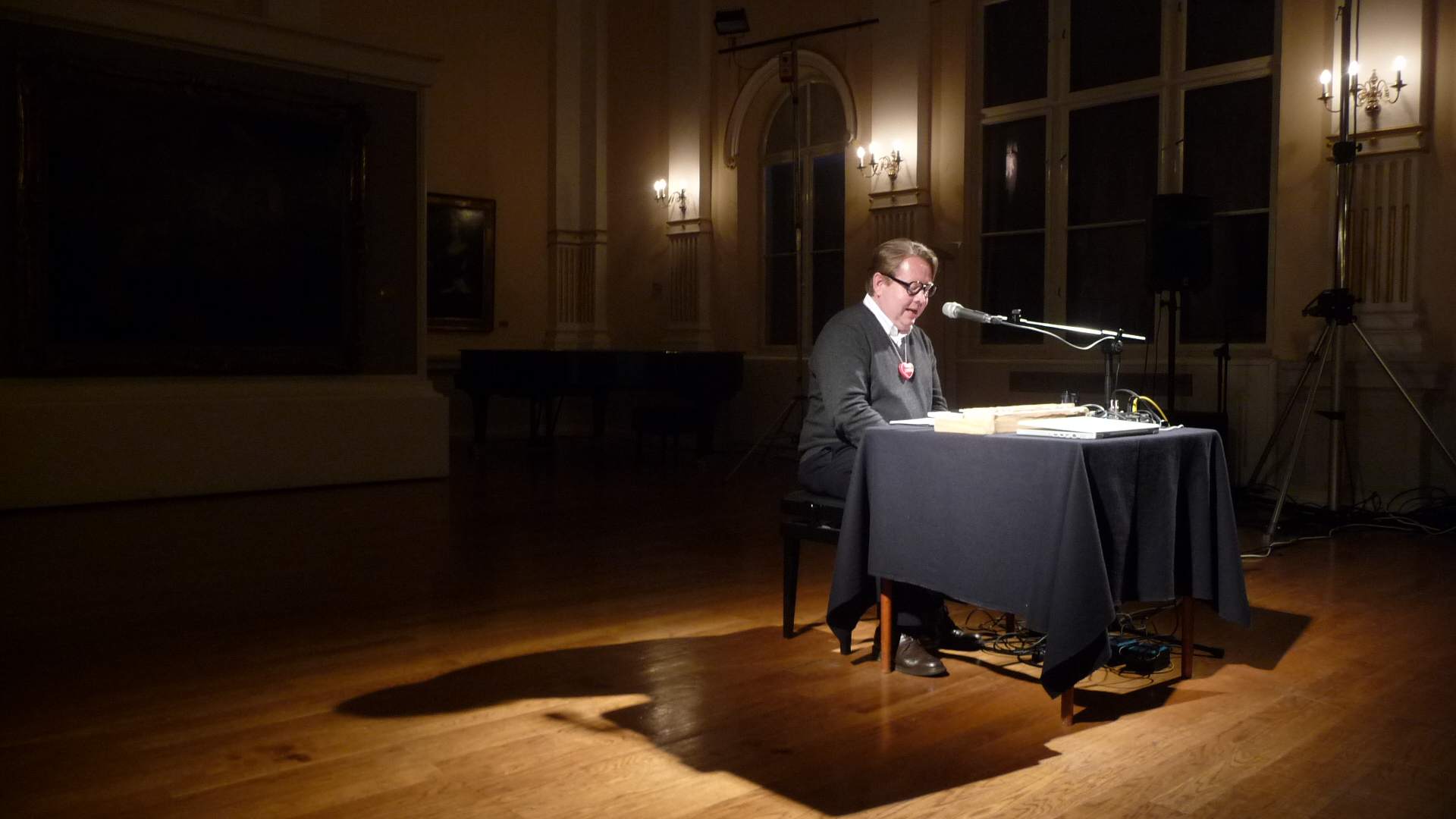
Alexander García Düttmann's lecture in the Mimara Museum, 25th Music Biennale, April 2009

A concert by the Slovenian avant-garde music band Laibach at the 1983 Biennale caused a huge scandal. As a part of their music act, they reproduced speeches by the late Yugoslav president Tito while simultaneously displaying a pornographic film. The show was eventually interrupted by the police, and the Biennale once again came on the verge of being abolished. The festival's already exhausted art director Igor Kuljerić had a nervous breakdown and absconded to the island of Silba.

The 21st Biennale in 2001 lasted ten days, which was its longest duration to date.

The Biennale's 25th edition was held from 17 to 26 April 2009 at multiple venues, including Vatroslav Lisinski Concert Hall, Croatian National Theatre, Gavella Drama Theatre, and Mimara Museum. Its theme was "Art & Politics".

In 2025, the Biennale featured a number of debuts, including that of the Hong Kong New Music Ensemble and the Spanish Vertixe Sonora Ensemble. Under the direction of the composer-performer Angus Lee, the joint ensemble presented premieres of works by the conductor in addition to those by Sonja Mutić, Camilo Mendez and Pilar Miralles.

== See also ==
- Zagreb Festival, another music festival since 1953, also known as Zagrebfest
- List of experimental music festivals
