= Ivo Maček =

Croatian pianist

- Born: 24 March 1914
- Died: 26 May 2002 (aged 88)
- Era: 20th century
- Works: http://quercus.mic.hr/quercus/person/306

Ivo Maček (24 March 1914–26 May 2002) was a prominent Croatian pianist, composer, teacher, editor and academician. He was born in Sušak on 24 March 1914 and died in Zagreb on 26 May 2002. On account of his diverse social work, for his work as a pianist, composer and editor, he was the recipient of numerous awards and recognitions.

== Life ==
Ivo Maček was born in Sušak on 24 March 1914 and died in Zagreb on 26 May 2002. He inherited his love for music from his parents, Dr Pavao (1880–1932) and Marija Maček née Heffler (1892–1978). While his father, a history and geography teacher, played "two or three instruments" in his youth, his mother learned piano and violin and played the viola in the Society Orchestra of the Croatian Music Institute in Zagreb until her death in 1978. In 1922, he started his music education with a private teacher, Vjekoslav Rosenberg-Ružić (1870–1954). From the very next year, he went on studying the piano with Rosenberg-Ružić in the Junior Music School in Zagreb, and then in the Secondary Music School (1927–1931), and then at the High School of the State Music Academy in Zagreb. In 1934, just a year after graduating from the Second Classics High School in Zagreb, he took a certificate in the piano, his major, taking the Vjekoslav Klaić Prize of the Croatian Music Institute as the best student of the year.

When his course was over, Maček went to Svetislav Stančić (1895–1970) for further studies, and then, although brought up in the tradition of the German pianistic school, he continued his studies in 1939 in Paris with the French pianist Alfred-Denis Cortot (1877–1962). With Cortot, he mastered an interpretative technique that was always there to serve style and poetic ideas. Amalgamating the best features of both schools, German precision, speed and huge sound, and French expressiveness and fine shading, Maček developed into a pianist who avoided any endeavour to find favour with the public via superficial virtuosity. He was a refined interpreter, precise and readable in his performance, with a discreet and unobtrusive style. He gave concerts in many cities of Croatia and the former Yugoslavia as well as in Austria, Czechoslovakia, Egypt, France, Great Britain, Hungary, Ireland, Italy, Lebanon, Poland, Slovakia and Switzerland. His career as a soloist lasted from 1926 to 1958. He broke a long period of silence as a solo performer with a concert performance on 30 October 1994, when he gave the first performance of his own Concertino for Piano and Chamber Orchestra at the Croatian Music Institute in Zagreb accompanied by the Croatian Chamber Orchestra conducted by Pavle Dešpalj.

Maček took up chamber music in the Secondary Music School. In the context of the school's own performances from 1928 to 1933, the talented young pianist in his earliest chamber outings showed both musicality and a brilliant ability to accommodate his playing to the soloist. Later, as a leading chamber musician, he was a founder-member of two celebrated piano trios. His collaboration with violinist Stjepan Šulek and violinist Stanko Žepić (from 1935 to 1939) started not long after the end of Maček's studies at the Music Academy. They drew favourable comments from the public in a concert at the Croatian Music Institute on 16 May 1938, playing for the first time Maček's Piano Trio. In the opinion of the reviewers, Maček had shown in this compositional firstborn that he had both talent and knowledge; he had successfully mastered the form, adroitly worked out the ideas in terms of motifs, made use of interesting harmonies and successfully combined the three instruments.

The best-known Croatian piano trio, Maček–Šulek–Janigro, was founded at Maček's initiative. During their five years of working together (from 1940 to 1945) they interpreted works of different stylistic periods, opening up the roads for their own artistic maturation and virtuosity and the capacity for a profound understanding of what they performed. In association with cellist Antonio Janigro (1939 to 1941; 1944 to 1949) and Ludwig Hoelscher (1942), with Enrico Mainardi (1949 to 1950, 1953) and Mirko Dorner (from 1952 to 1953), Maček stood out as an excellent, reliable and valuable accompanist. The most successful of all these associations was with Mirko Dorner, in a duo with whom he won the first prize at the 3rd international music competition in Vercelli (1952). After many years of absence from public musical life (he gave his last chamber concert in 1957), Maček returned to the concert stage with the cellist Valter Dešpalj (from 1975 to 1979). During his chamber career, Maček worked with the violinists Stjepan Šulek, Ivan Pinkava, Zlatko Baloković, Zlatko Topolski and Aleksandar Szegedi, and created a celebrated piano duo with Jurica Murai (from 1952 to 1957). He also worked with vocal artists, such as the soprano Irma Turković, the alto Marijana Radev, the tenor Mario Djuranec, the baritone Ivo Lhotka-Kalinski and the bass Tomislav Neralić.

== Work ==
Three composers were particularly influential in the shaping of Maček's composing personality. He studied composition at the Music Academy in Zagreb with Franjo Dugan Sr (1874–1948), who, employing Romantic expressive resources in his oeuvre, also used elements of Baroque polyphony as a support on which to hang firmly rounded forms. Thanks to a French government scholarship from 1939 to 1940, he went on with his studies with Jean Jules Aimable Roger-Ducasse (1873–1954), who, as a composer, was uncompromising in rejecting the sentimental outpourings of late Romanticism and its conservative patterns and developed his style on elements of what was then up-to-date French music. In 1942, Maček went to Salzburg to Joseph Marx's (1882–1964). The music of this Austrian composer breathed the spirit of French Impressionism and successfully conjoined the beauty of a lush melody with harmonic refinement.

The composing personality of Ivo Maček was formed in a classical mould. He drew on the best patterns of earlier centuries but also paid heed to the speech of his time. In his creative work, he did not aspire for radical changes, had a circumspect attitude toward contemporary musical trends and did not show any experimental audacity in his work. His oeuvre comprises sixteen compositions, two for choirs, six for piano, seven for various chamber ensembles, and one composition for piano and chamber orchestra. The two choral compositions are in fact motets in the classical polyphonic style: Gressus meos, for a four-part mixed choir, and Confortamini for a five-part mixed choir, composed during his composition studies at the Music Academy in Zagreb (in 1934). The piano compositions of Ivo Maček are good examples of his composing poetics. They reflect a composer who had developed while creating music, primarily via the piano medium. Unlike the Romantic saturation of the piano texture of his earlier compositions (Intermezzo, 1935; Improvisation, 1937; Theme and Variations, 1939), the later compositions (Sonatina, 1977; Sonata, 1985; Prelude and Toccata, 1987 and Concertino for piano and chamber orchestra, 1991) had a lighter and more transparent facture, dominated by thematically more profiled ideas. In the piano oeuvre of Maček, it can be seen that his musical expression is the consequence of a mixture of styles. While in the earlier works, within the Romantic expressiveness, he shows a sensitivity for Impressionist colourism, he wrote the later works within the context of neo-Classicist patterns filled with unique bitonality, polymeters and polyrhythms, with flat dynamics or full of energy.

The major part of his oeuvre is made up of chamber compositions: Piano Trio (1935), Sonata for Violin and Piano (1955), 1st String Quartet (1980), Sonata for Violin and Piano (1985), Wind Quintet (1987), Wind Trio (1994) and 2nd String Quartet (1997). They are perhaps the best example of the evolutionary line of Maček’s composing work. The first Maček chamber composition, Trio for Violin, Violoncello and Pianoforte, is an example of his re-interpretation of the Romantic heritage, while the last five compositions are marked by the style of neo-Classicism. Sonata for Cello and Piano is alone between these two periods of his work (the first from 1935 to 1940 and the second from 1977 to 1997). In it, one can feel a connection with the Romantic orientation of the earlier compositions and an inkling of the neo-Classicist features of his later compositions. The chamber compositions of Ivo Maček reflect a pianist-composer, who, through chamber playing, became familiar with different instruments, their capacities and technical problems. His works are characterised by a richness of invention and the power of imagination that followed his emotions.

== Maček as a teacher ==
In parallel with his career in piano and in composing, Ivo Maček had a third string to his bow, the educational. His work in education started when he was a teacher of piano at the Lisinski Private Music School in Zagreb (1936–1939). Working as a rehearsal pianist in the National Theatre in Zagreb in 1940, Maček took over the duty of trainee music teacher in the Third Boys' Real High School. He had the same duties from 1940 to 1941 in the Secondary School of the Academy of Musical and Theatrical Art in Zagreb. From 1941 to 1945, he worked as a music teacher at the Secondary Music School of the Music Academy. In the period from 1943 to 1945, he was employed as a piano teacher in the Army Piano School in Zagreb. Then, at the Music Academy, he was an assistant professor (dozent) in piano from 1945 to 1950 and an associate professor from 1950 to 1959. He became a full professor in 1961. From 1967 to his retirement in 1977, he was head of the department for piano and organ. Inheriting the best characteristics of his own teachers, as an educator, Ivo Maček developed his pupils' natural capacities and trained a series of well-known concert pianists and teachers. In addition to all this, Maček found time to edit sheet music compositions of other composers. He edited the following editions: Six and Twelve Little Preludes, Johann Sebastian Bach; Für Elise; Sonata in F minor op. 2, no. 1; Sonata in C minor op.10, no 1; Sonata in F major op. 10. no 2; Sonata in D major op. 10, no. 3; Sonata in C minor (Pathétique), op.13; Sonata in E major op. 14, no. 1; Sonata in G major op. 14, no. 2; Sonata in C sharp minor op. 27, no. 2; Sonata in G minor op. 49, no 1; Sonata in G major, op. 49, no. 2; Sonata in G major op. 79 of Ludwig van Beethoven and Piano Works of Josip Štolcer-Slavenski in two volumes. Maček's contributed much to society. The most important and responsible functions were confided to him. He was the first president of the Federation of Music Artists of Yugoslavia (1950) and the long-term president of the Association of Music Artists of Croatia (1950–1951; 1955–1960). As a versatile and high-level music artist, he was elected, for his musical culture, knowledge and capacity, a corresponding member (fellow) of the Yugoslav Academy of Sciences and Arts (1954), afterwards a full member (1983).

As well as all this, Ivo Maček found time to carry out the duties of a delegate of the Council for Education at the final examinations of secondary music schools. In addition, from 1968 to 1970, he taught music, as a guest professor, at the international music seminars of the Franz Liszt College of Music in Weimar. He was a member of juries of numerous competitions for young pianists at home (Contest of Music Artists of Yugoslavia) and abroad (the Tchaikovsky in Moscow in 1962 and the Chopin Competition in Warsaw in 1965, the Busoni in Bolzano in 1965 and the Johann Sebastian Bach Competition in Leipzig in 1964 and 1968).

== Works ==
- String Quartet No 1 (1980)
- String Quartet No 2 (1995)
- Concertino for piano and chamber orchestra (1991)
- Two classical motets – Confortamini and Gressus meos for four-part mixed choir (1934)
- Elegy for piano
- Improvisation for piano (1937)
- Intermezzo for piano (1935)
- Prelude and Toccata for piano (1987)
- Wind Quintet (1987)
- Wind Trio (1994)
- Romantic Trio for piano, violin and cello (1935)
- Sonata for piano (1985)
- Sonata for violin and piano (1985)
- Sonata for cello and piano in A minor (1955)
- Sonatina for piano (1977)
- Theme With Variations for piano (1939)
