= Giovanni Ricciardi =

Italian musician (born 1968)

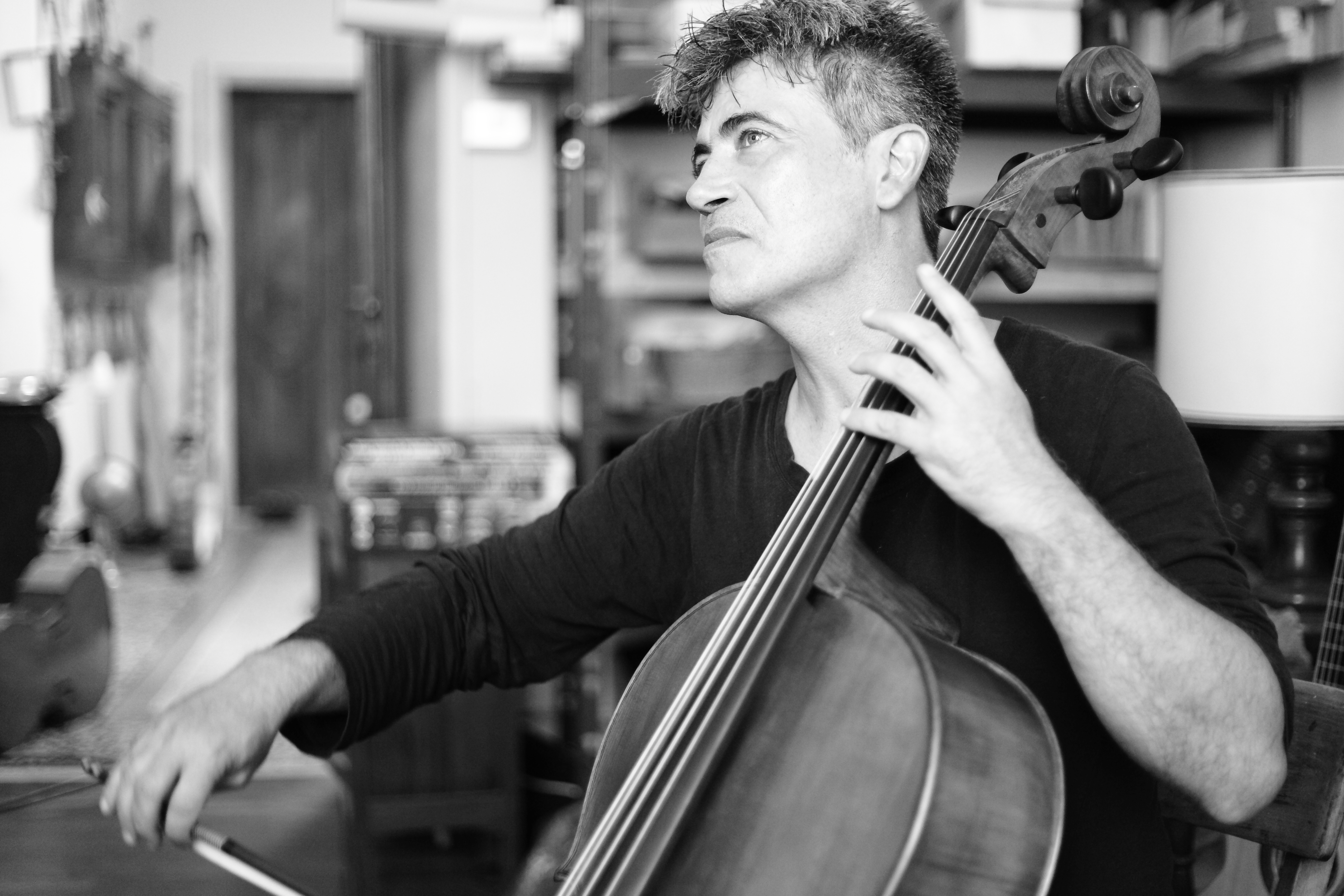
Giovanni Ricciardi

Giovanni Ricciardi (born 1968 in Genoa) is an Italian cellist.

== Career ==
Ricciardi began to play the cello at the age of six, and as a boy he studied under Michael Flaksman. He graduated from the Niccolò Paganini Conservatory in Genoa. He embarked on a solo career, and has performed with major symphony orchestras in different countries.

He has won numerous competitions including the international competition for the city of Stresa, the international competition for the Premio Rovere d'Oro, and the national competition for stringed instruments in Genoa.

He has recorded several CDs on a very wide repertoire ranging from Bach to Vivaldi, Pergolesi, Debussy, Fauré, Schumann, and Brahms.

In 2015 he was a supporter and musical director of the first reunion of over 120 cellists in Genoa, a historic event for the city.
