= La Damnation de Faust =

1846 opera by Hector Berlioz

- Légende dramatique by Hector Berlioz
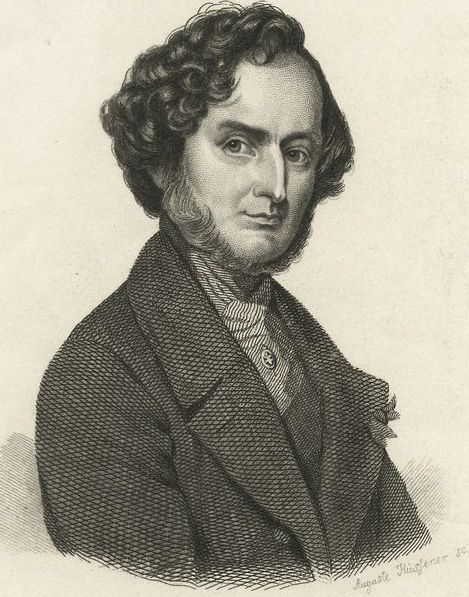
- Hector Berlioz
- English: The Damnation of Faust
- Opus: 24
- Language: French
- Based on: Goethe's Faust
- Composed: 1845
- Performed: 6 December 1846
- Scoring: four soloists; children's chorus; seven-part choir; orchestra

La Damnation de Faust (English: The Damnation of Faust), Op. 24 is a French musical composition for four solo voices, full seven-part chorus, large children's chorus and orchestra by the French composer Hector Berlioz. He called it a légende dramatique ("dramatic legend"). It was first performed at the Opéra-Comique in Paris on 6 December 1846.

== Background and composition history ==
Berlioz read Johann Wolfgang von Goethe's Faust, Part One in 1828, in Gérard de Nerval's translation. "This marvelous book fascinated me from the first", he recalled in his Memoirs. "I could not put it down. I read it incessantly, at meals, in the theatre, in the street."

The work so impressed Berlioz that he composed a suite entitled Eight Scenes from Faust, which became his Opus 1 (1829), though he later recalled all the copies of it he could find. He returned to the material in 1845, to make a larger work, with some additional text by Almire Gandonnière to Berlioz's specifications, that he first called a "concert opera", and as it expanded, finally a "légende dramatique" ("dramatic legend").

Berlioz worked on the score during his concert tour of 1845, adding his own text for "Nature immense, impénétrable et fière"—Faust's climactic invocation of all nature—and incorporating the Rákóczi March, which had been a thunderous success at a concert in Pest, Hungary, on 15 February 1846.

== Performance history ==
Its first performance at the Opéra-Comique, Paris, 6 December 1846, did not meet with critical acclaim, perhaps due to its halfway status between opera and cantata. The public was apathetic, and two performances (and a cancelled third) rendered a financial setback for Berlioz:

"Nothing in my career as an artist wounded me more deeply than this unexpected indifference", he remembered.

La damnation de Faust is performed regularly in concert halls, since its first successful complete performance in concert in Paris, in 1877. Sir Charles Hallé gave the first complete performance in England on 5 February 1880. It is occasionally staged as an opera, for the first time in Opéra de Monte-Carlo on 18 February 1893, where it was produced by its director Raoul Gunsbourg with Jean de Reszke singing the role of Faust and Rose Caron, Marguerite. The Metropolitan Opera premiered it first in concert (2 February 1896) and then on stage (the United States stage premiere on 7 December 1906) and revived it in concert at Carnegie Hall on 10 November 1996 (repeated on tour in Tokyo the next year). The company presented a staged production on 7 November 2008, produced and directed by Robert Lepage, with techniques of computer-generated stage imagery that responded to the performers' voices. Filmmaker Terry Gilliam made his opera debut at London's English National Opera in May 2011, directing The Damnation of Faust. In 2015, the Opéra National de Paris reimagined the role of Faust by assuming the persona of English scientist Stephen Hawking for that role. This version of the work also reinterpreted the metaphysical journey Faust is sent on by Méphistophélès in relation to the Mars One project; portraying the dilemma of man leaving earth to populate Mars. The Paris Opera cooperated with NASA, ESA, CNES. and film companies which produce environmental films for the production of Berlioz's work.

Three instrumental passages, the Marche Hongroise (Hungarian March), Ballet des sylphes, and Menuet des follets are sometimes extracted and performed as "Three Orchestral Pieces from La damnation de Faust."

== Analysis ==
Julian Rushton has examined the general chronology of Berlioz's composition of the work. Kent Werth has written about Berlioz's sketches for the passage 'Invocation a la nature' and what their indications about Berlioz's working methods.

Eric Stark has commented on Berlioz's use of the chorus to convey specific information about time, place, and visual imagery in the work. Inge van Rij has discussed various 'technological tropes' implicit in the work.

== Roles ==
Roles, voice types, premiere cast
Role	Voice type	Premiere cast, 6 December 1846 Conductor: Hector Berlioz
Marguerite, a young woman	mezzo-soprano	Hortense Duflot-Maillard
Faust, an aging scholar	tenor	Gustave-Hippolyte Roger
Méphistophélès, the Devil disguised as a gentleman	baritone or bass	Léonard Hermann-Léon
Brander, a student	bass	Henri Descheynes
Celestial Voice	soprano	
Peasants, gnomes and sylphs, soldiers and students, demons and the damned, celestial spirits

== Instrumentation ==
The orchestral score requires:

- 3 flutes (all doubling piccolo), 2 oboes (second doubling English horn), 2 clarinets (in C/A/B♭), bass clarinet in B♭, 4 bassoons
- 4 horns (in all keys), 2 trumpets in C/D/F, 2 cornets in A/B♭, 3 trombones, 2 tubas (originally scored for one ophicleide and one tuba)
- timpani, snare drum, bass drum, cymbals, suspended cymbal, triangle, tamtam, bell (sounding D, F♯, A, or C)
- 2 harps
- strings: 15 violins I, 15 violins II, 10 violas, 10 violoncellos, 9 double basses

== Synopsis ==
=== Part I ===
"Marche Hongroise" (Hungarian March)
Played by the U.S. Marine Band in 1995 for the album Director's Choice (4:57)

The aging scholar Faust contemplates the renewal of nature. Hearing peasants sing and dance, he realizes that their simple happiness is something he will never experience. An army marches past in the distance (Hungarian March). Faust doesn't understand why the soldiers are so enthusiastic about glory and fame.

=== Part II ===
Depressed, Faust has returned to his study. Even the search for wisdom can no longer inspire him. Tired of life, he is about to commit suicide when the sound of church bells and an Easter hymn remind him of his youth, when he still had faith in religion. Suddenly Méphistophélès appears, ironically commenting on Faust's apparent conversion. He offers to take him on a journey, promising him the restoration of his youth, knowledge, and the fulfillment of all his wishes. Faust accepts.

Méphistophélès and Faust arrive at Auerbach's tavern in Leipzig, where Brander, a student, sings a song about a rat whose high life in a kitchen is ended by a dose of poison. The other guests offer an ironic "Amen", and Méphistophélès continues with another song about a flea that brings his relatives to infest a whole royal court (Song of the Flea). Disgusted by the vulgarity of it all, Faust demands to be taken somewhere else.

On a meadow by the Elbe, Méphistophélès shows Faust a dream vision of a beautiful woman named Marguerite, causing Faust to fall in love with her. He calls out her name, and Méphistophélès promises to lead Faust to her. Together with a group of students and soldiers, they enter the town where she lives.

=== Part III ===
Faust and Méphistophélès hide in Marguerite's room. Faust feels that he will find in her, his ideal of a pure and innocent woman ("Merci, doux crépuscule!"). Marguerite enters and sings Goethe's folk-style ballad about the King of Thule, who always remained sadly faithful to his lost love ("Autrefois, un roi de Thulé"). Méphistophélès summons spirits to enchant and deceive the girl and sings a sarcastic serenade outside her window, predicting her loss of innocence. When the spirits have vanished, Faust steps forward. Marguerite admits that she has dreamed of him, just as he has dreamed of her, and they declare their love for each other. Just then, Méphistophélès bursts in, warning them that the girl's reputation must be saved: the neighbors have learned that there is a man in Marguerite's room and have called her mother to the scene. After a hasty goodbye, Faust and Méphistophélès escape.

=== Part IV ===
Faust has seduced, then abandoned Marguerite, who still awaits his return ("D'amour l'ardente flamme"). She can hear soldiers and students in the distance, which reminds her of the night Faust first came to her house. But this time he is not among them.

Faust calls upon nature to cure him of his world-weariness ("Nature immense, impénétrable et fière"). Méphistophélès appears and tells him that Marguerite is in prison. While awaiting Faust's return, she has given her mother the sleeping potion Faust had previously provided to calm her mother during their nights of love, and used it so often that she has killed the old woman, and now is to be hanged the next day. Faust panics, but Méphistophélès claims he can save her—if Faust relinquishes his soul to him. Unable to think of anything but saving Marguerite, Faust agrees. The two ride off on a pair of black horses.

Thinking they are on their way to Marguerite, Faust becomes terrified when he sees demonic apparitions. The landscape becomes more and more horrible and grotesque, and Faust finally realizes that Méphistophélès has taken him directly into hell. Demons and damned spirits greet Méphistophélès in a mysterious infernal language and welcome Faust among them.

Hell has fallen silent after Faust's arrival—the torment he suffers is unspeakable. Marguerite is saved and welcomed into heaven.

== Selected discography ==
The following selected discography of the work presents the vocal performers in the order: Faust, Marguerite, Méphistophélès, Brander. The singer of the Celestial Voice is included afterwards where information is available.

David Poleri, Suzanne Danco, Martial Singher, Donald Gramm, McHenry Boatwright
Boston Symphony Orchestra, Harvard Glee Club, Radcliffe Choral Society
Conductor: Charles Munch
Recorded: 21–22 February 1954, Symphony Hall, Boston
Label: RCA Red Seal Records LM 6114 (original mono LP set)

Richard Verreau, Consuelo Rubio, Michel Roux, Pierre Mollet
Lamoureux Concert Association Orchestra, Chorale Élisabeth Brasseur
Conductor: Igor Markevitch
Recorded: Salle de la Mutualité, Paris, May 1959
Label: Deutsche Grammophon 138 099 (stereo LP set)

Nicolai Gedda, Janet Baker, Gabriel Bacquier, Pierre Thau, Maria Peronne
Orchestre de Paris, Choeurs du Théâtre National de l'Opéra
Conductor: Georges Prêtre
Recorded: October 1969, Salle Wagram, Paris
Label: EMI Classics HMV SLS 947/2

Nicolai Gedda, Josephine Veasey, Jules Bastin, Richard Van Allan, Gillian Knight
London Symphony Orchestra and Chorus, Ambrosian Singers and Wandsworth School Boys' Choir
Conductor: Colin Davis
Recorded: Wembley Town Hall, July 1973
Label: Philips 6703 042

Stuart Burrows, Donald McIntyre, Edith Mathis, Thomas Paul, Judith Dickson
Boston Symphony Orchestra, Tanglewood Festival Chorus, Boston Boy Choir
Conductor: Seiji Ozawa
Label: Deutsche Grammophon 2709 048 (1974)

Plácido Domingo, Yvonne Minton, Dietrich Fischer-Dieskau, Jules Bastin, Claudine Chastagnol
Chœur de l'Orchestre de Paris, Chœur dEnfants de Paris, Orchestre de Paris
Conductor: Daniel Barenboim
Label: Deutsche Grammophon 2740 199 (1979)

Kenneth Riegel, Frederica von Stade, José van Dam, Malcolm King
Chicago Symphony Orchestra and Chorus
Conductor: Sir Georg Solti
Recorded: May 1981, Medinah Temple, Chicago
Label: Decca / London 289 483-311-3

Dénes Gulyás, Maria Ewing, Robert Lloyd, Manfred Volz
Radio-Sinfonie-Orchester Frankfurt, Kölner Rundfundchor, Südfunkchor Stuttgart, Chor des NDR Hamburg
Conductor: Eliahu Inbal
Label: Denon 81757 9200 2 (1991)

Michael Myers, Anne Sofie von Otter, Jean-Philippe Lafont, René Schirrer
Orchestre de l'Opéra de Lyon, Edinburgh Festival Chorus
Conductor: Sir John Eliot Gardiner
Label: Philips 289 426-199-2 (1989)

Keith Olsen, Jennifer Larmore, David Wilson-Johnson, Huub Claessens
Städtischer Musikverein Zu Düsseldorf, Royal Flanders Philharmonic Orchestra
Conductor: Günter Neuhold
Label: Bayer Records – BR 500 017/18 (1994)

Thomas Moser, Susan Graham, José van Dam, Frédéric Caton
Lyon Opera Orchestra and Chorus
Conductor: Kent Nagano
Label: Warner Classics UK / Erato 0630-10692-2 (1995)

Richard Leech, Françoise Pollet, Gilles Cachemaille, Michel Philippe
Chœur de lOrchestre Symphonique De Montréal, Orchestre Symphonique de Montréal
Conductor: Charles Dutoit
Label: Decca 289 444 812-2 (1996)

André Turp, Régine Crespin, Michel Roux, John Shirley-Quirk
London Symphony Orchestra and Chorus
Conductor: Pierre Monteux
Recorded: Royal Festival Hall, 8 March 1962 (live performance)
Label: BBC Legends BBCL 40062 (1998 CD issue)

Keith Lewis, Anne Sofie von Otter, Bryn Terfel, Victor von Halem, David Nicklass
Philharmonia Orchestra and Chorus
Conducted: Myung-Whun Chung
Audio CD (11 August 1998)
Label: Deutsche Grammophon 289 453-500-2

Giuseppe Sabbatini, Enkelejda Shkosa, Michele Pertusi, David Wilson-Johnson
London Symphony Chorus, London Symphony Orchestra
Conductor: Sir Colin Davis
Label: LSO Live – LSO 0008 (2001)

Michael Myers, Marie-Ange Todorovitch, Alain Vernhes, René Schirrer
Orchestre National de Lille, Slovak Philharmonic Choir
Conductor: Jean-Claude Casadesus
Label: Naxos 8.660116-17 (2006)

Vinson Cole, Charlotte Margiono, Thomas Quasthoff, Jaco Huijpen
Radio Filharmonisch Orkest, Groot Omroepkoor
Conductor: Bernard Haitink
Label: Challenge Classics CC72517 (live recording from 1999; commercial release in 2011)

Marcello Giordani, José van Dam, Katarina Dalayman, Roderick Earle
Münchner Philharmoniker, Philharmonischer Chor München
Conductor: James Levine
Label: Münchner Philharmoniker 0793052112707 (2018)

Bryan Hymel, Karen Cargill, Christopher Purves, Gábor Bretz
London Symphony Orchestra and Chorus
Conductor: Sir Simon Rattle
Hybrid SACD (8 March 2019)
Label: LSO Live LSO0809

Michael Spyres, Joyce DiDonato, Nicolas Courjal, Alexandre Duhamel, Verónica Silva
Orchestre philharmonique de Strasbourg, Les Petits Chanteurs de Strasbourg, Maitrise de l'Opéra national du Rhin
Conductor: John Nelson
Recorded: 25–27 April 2019
Label: Erato/Warner Classics 0190295417352

=== DVD recordings ===
Paul Groves, Vesselina Kasarova ,Willard White, Andreas Marco
Orfeón Donostiarra de San Sebastian, Tölzer Knabenchor, Staatskapelle Berlin
Conductor: Sylvain Cambreling
Video from a production at the Salzburg Festival
Label: Arthaus Musik 100018 (DVD, 1999)

Keith Lewis, Anne Sofie von Otter, José van Dam, Peter Rose
Chicago Symphony Chorus, Westminster Cathedral Choristers, Chicago Symphony Orchestra
Conductor: Sir Georg Solti
Concert performance at The Proms from 28 August 1989
Label: Arthaus Musik 109182 (DVD, 2016)

Anna Caterina Antonacci, Mathias Vidal, Nicolas Courjal, Thibault de Damas d’Anlezy
Chœur Marguerite Louise, Les Siècles
Conductor: François-Xavier Roth
Label: Château de Versailles Spectacles CVS010 (DVD, 2019)

== Parodies ==
- The piece "L'Éléphant" (The Elephant) from Camille Saint-Saëns's The Carnival of the Animals (1886) uses a theme from the "Danse des sylphes", played on a double bass.
