= Michael Flaksman =

American cellist (1946–2019)

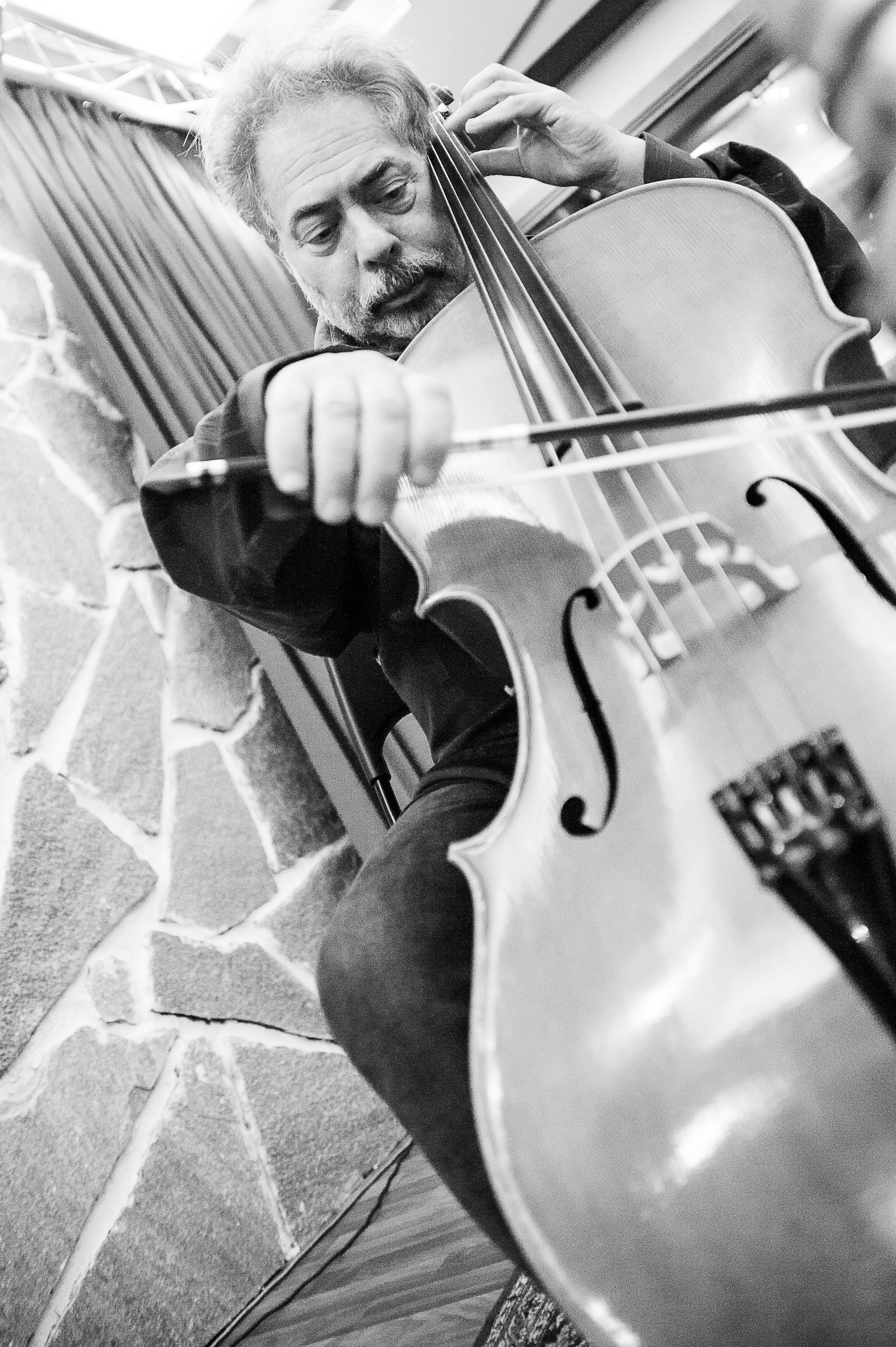
Michael Flaksman playing cello

Michael Flaksman (3 May 1946, in Akron, Ohio, United States – 18 October 2019) was an American cellist.

He received his first cello lessons from Ernst Silberstein, and then from Leonard Rose and Maurice Eisenberg.

He made his debut at the age of seventeen as a soloist with the Cleveland Orchestra, and in 1964 and 1965 he was invited to the Marlboro Festival where he participated in the master classes of Pablo Casals and performed with Rudolf Serkin as well as with other prominent artists.

After graduating from the Harvard University he went on to study harmony and composition with Nadia Boulanger. He furthered his cello studies with Antonio Janigro and soon became his assistant in both Stuttgart and Salzburg, then his successor in Stuttgart, and since 1991 he has been teaching at the High School of Music in Heidelberg/ Mannheim.

He made his European debut in Salzburg in 1974 and was the prize winner at the International cello Competition in Bologna in the same year. In 1975 he received the Casals Centenary Award in Barcelona.

He performed widely in recitals, chamber music concerts and with orchestras throughout Europe and in the Far East, as well as conducted master classes in Germany, Austria, Switzerland, Italy, Poland and Croatia.

He recorded for many radio stations and made CDs with, among other compositions, all the suites for violoncello solo by J. S. Bach and the entire oeuvre for cello and piano by Gabriel Fauré.

He was Honorary President at Italian Cello Consort, a cellist group created by his student and assistant Giovanni Ricciardi.

He died on 18 October 2019 at the age of 73.
