= Almire Gandonnière =

French writer (1814–1863)

Almire Gandonnière (3 August 1814, Loué – 25 October 1863, San Francisco) was a French writer, remembered today only as the collaborator with Hector Berlioz of the libretto for La Damnation de Faust (1846), which was based on the translation of Goethe's masterpiece by Gérard de Nerval. Gandonnière, under various pseudonyms, published satires, verses and occasional critical essays in the Paris press.
