= McHenry Boatwright =

American opera singer

John McHenry Boatwright (February 29, 1928 – November 5, 1994) was an American operatic bass-baritone and singing teacher.

== Early life and education ==
He was born in Tennille, Georgia, in 1928, and studied piano and voice at the New England Conservatory, graduating in 1954.

== Career ==
He made his debut at Tanglewood in 1953. He sang with the New England Opera Theater in Boston, where Leonard Bernstein heard him and invited him to sing with the New York Philharmonic.

In 1956, he created the title role in Clarence Cameron White's opera Ouanga, presented by the National Negro Opera Company at the Metropolitan Opera House. In 1958 he appeared in "Lost In The Stars" at the New York City Center Theatre. In 1961, 1962 &1966, he was a soloist with the Naumburg Orchestral Concerts, in the Naumburg Bandshell, Central Park, in the summer series. In 1967 he sang the lead role in Gunther Schuller's opera The Visitation at the Hamburg State Opera. In 1969, he took part in the premiere performance of Dave Brubeck's The Gates of Justice, with the composer also participating.

== Recordings ==
- Hector Berlioz's La damnation de Faust, with Donald Gramm and Suzanne Danco, with the Boston Symphony Orchestra under Charles Munch (1954)
- The Art of McHenry Boatwright - Spirituals
- the role of Crown in a 1963 Grammy award-winning disc of highlights from George Gershwin's Porgy and Bess, with Leontyne Price, William Warfield and John W. Bubbles, conducted by Skitch Henderson
- Crown again in the first complete stereo recording of Porgy and Bess, with the Cleveland Orchestra under Lorin Maazel (1976).

== Teaching ==
For many years he was a voice teacher at Ohio State University, a post he gained through a letter of recommendation from Marian Anderson. At his death he was a professor emeritus in the university's School of Music. He was the recipient of two Marian Anderson Awards.

Boatwright sang for several Presidents at the White House, including at Jimmy Carter's 1977 inauguration.

== Death ==
McHenry Boatwright died of cancer on November 5, 1994. He is buried in the Ellington Lot at Woodlawn Cemetery in the Bronx, New York.

== Personal life ==
In 1980 (or 1979) he became the second (or third) husband of Ruth Ellington (1915–2004), the sister and business manager of the late Duke Ellington. They had met when he sang at Duke Ellington's funeral in 1974. He produced the Duke Ellington Sacred Concerts performed in New York and London in 1982.
