= Antonio Janigro =

Italian musician (1918–1989)

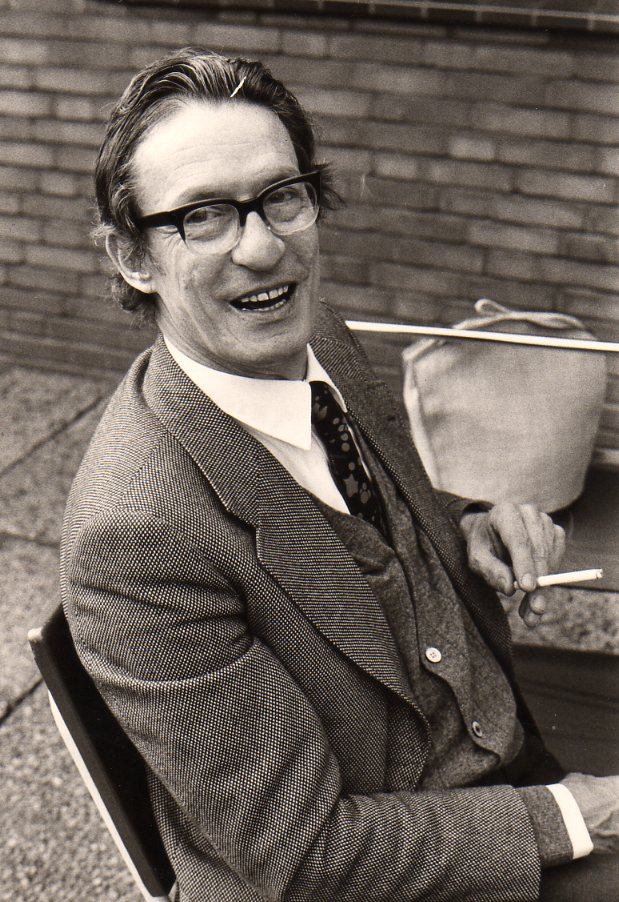
- Born: 21 January 1918; Milan, Kingdom of Italy
- Died: 1 May 1989 (aged 71)
- Education: Verdi Conservatory
- Occupations: cellist conductor

Antonio Janigro (21 January 1918 – 1 May 1989) was an Italian cellist and conductor.

== Biography ==
Born in Milan, he began studying piano when he was six and cello when he was eight. Initially taught by Giovanni Berti, Janigro enrolled in the Verdi Conservatory of Milan, where he was instructed by Gilberto Crepax. By 1934 Janigro was studying under Diran Alexanian and Pablo Casals at the École Normale in Paris. He graduated from the school in 1934 and began performing solo and in recitals with Dinu Lipatti, Paul Badura-Skoda and Alfredo Rossi.

Janigro was on vacation in Yugoslavia when it was invaded by the Axis powers in 1941, thus leaving him stranded in that country for the duration of World War II. He became a professor of cello and chamber music at the Zagreb Conservatory, where his influence developed modern cello playing in Yugoslavia. He also performed as part of a trio with Ivo Maček and Stjepan Šulek. At war's end Janigro travelled throughout South America and East Asia as a soloist. In 1949, he started his career as a conductor. In 1959, he was Fritz Reiner's soloist, along with Milton Preves and John Weicher, in a Chicago Symphony Orchestra recording of Strauss's Don Quixote.

Janigro taught many cellists around the world. Most of them studied at the Staatliche Hochschule für Musik und Darstellende Kunst Stuttgart and the Mozarteum Salzburg. Among his students were Julius Berger, Mario Brunello, Thomas Demenga, Michael Flaksman, Michael Groß, Antonio Meneses, Andrej Petrac, Mario de Secondi, Giovanni Sollima, Gustavo Tavares, Enrico Dindo and Christoph Theinert.

He also was a successful conductor who led a symphony orchestra for Radio Zagreb and guest-conducted throughout Europe. The chamber orchestra I Solisti di Zagreb was created by Janigro and Dragutin Hrdjok in 1954 and was led by Janigro until he left the ensemble in 1968.

== Biographies ==
There are two biographies of Antonio Janigro. The first one was published by Ulrich Bracher in German (Antonio Janigro - Musiker mit Leib und Seele: Leben und Werk eines großen Dirigenten und Cellisten, 1999 ISBN 978-3828008595.

A second biography/memoir was recently published by Janigro’s son (Antonio Janigro: A gentleman of the cello, ISBN 979-8335009263). This version is also available in Italian with the translation by Valerio Bervicato (Antonio Janigro: Un gentiluomo del violoncello, ISBN 979-8335009263).

== Recordings ==
- Vivaldi: Concertos for Diverse Instruments. I Solisti di Zagreb, Antonio Janigro -conductor. The Bach Guild, Vanguard Records Stereolab LP, BG/BGS-70665, 1960s.
- J. S. Bach: The 6 Cello Suites (1954, Westminster/Doremi DHR-8014~5)
- J. S. Bach: The 3 Sonatas for Cello and Harpsichord, Robert Veyron-Lacroix(harpsichord) (1954, Westminster/Doremi DHR-8014~5)
- Boccherini: Cello Concerto in B flat major, Prague Symphony Orchestra conducted by Milan Horvat (1948, Westminster/Doremi DHR-8016)
- Antonín Dvořák: Cello Concerto in B minor, Janigro – soloist, Vienna State Opera Orchestra conducted by Dean Dixon, (Westminster/ABC Records W-9716)
- Ludwig Beethoven: Cello Sonatas (Complete),[With Carlo Zecchi, Piano] Westminster XWN-2218

== Sources ==
- Dedication site
- Biography at Antonio Janigro Association Zagreb
