= Kenneth Riegel =

American opera singer (1938–2023)

- Born: April 19, 1938; Womelsdorf, Pennsylvania, U.S.
- Died: June 28, 2023 (aged 85); Sarasota, Florida, U.S.
- Occupation: Operatic tenor
- Years active: 1965–2005

Kenneth Riegel (April 19, 1938 – June 28, 2023) was an American opera tenor.

== Life and career ==
Riegel was born on April 19, 1938, in Womelsdorf, Pennsylvania. He made his theatrical début as the Alchemist in König Hirsch at Santa Fe Opera in 1965, debuting at the Royal Opera House, Covent Garden in the same year. He was engaged at the New York City Opera from 1969 (debut in L'heure espagnole, with Karan Armstrong) to 1974.

During this period, in 1969, 1971 and 1974 he was a soloist with the Naumburg Orchestral Concerts in the Naumburg Bandshell, Central Park, in the summer series.

He debuted at the Metropolitan Opera in Les Troyens in 1973 (as Iopas, opposite Jon Vickers and Shirley Verrett), subsequently appearing at the Met in another 102 performances in operas including La clemenza di Tito, Les contes d'Hoffmann, Elektra, Fidelio, Lulu, Die Meistersinger von Nürnberg, Rise and Fall of the City of Mahagonny, Salome, Die Zauberflöte and Wozzeck. He made his first appearance at the Salzburg Festival in 1975. In 1979, he sang Alwa at the first performance of the three-act version of Lulu at the Paris Opera. He played the title role in Der Zwerg in Hamburg in 1981. In 1983, he created the role of the Leper in Saint François d'Assise.

Riegel died in Sarasota, Florida, on June 28, 2023, at the age of 85.

== Partial discography ==
- Haydn: Harmoniemesse (Bernstein, 1973) Sony Classical
- Mozart: Don Giovanni (Raimondi; Maazel, 1978) Sony Classical
- Berg: Lulu (Stratas; Boulez, 1979) Deutsche Grammophon
- Berlioz: La damnation de Faust (von Stade, van Dam; Solti, 1981) Decca
- Messiaen: Saint François d'Assise (van Dam; Ozawa, 1983) Cybélia
- Henze: The Bassarids (Armstrong; Albrecht, 1986) Koch Schwann
- Mussorgsky: Boris Godounov (Vishnevskaya, Raimondi, Plishka; Rostropovich, 1987) Erato
- Strauss: Salome (Malfitano, Schwarz, Terfel; Dohnányi, 1994) Decca

== Selected filmography ==
- Mozart: Don Giovanni (Raimondi; Maazel, Losey, 1979)
- Berg: Lulu (Migenes; Levine, Dexter, 1980, Metropolitan Opera)
- Strauss: Salome (Ewing, Knight, Devlin; Downes, Hall, 1992, Covent Garden)
- Strauss: Salome (Malfitano, Silja, Terfel; Dohnányi, Bondy, 1997, Covent Garden)
