= Zagreb Soloists =

Croatian chamber orchestra

The Zagreb Soloists (Croatian: Zagrebački solisti) is a chamber orchestra founded in Zagreb, Croatia in 1953 through the auspices of Croatian Radiotelevision (in that time known as "Radiotelevision Zagreb"), under the artistic leadership of the Italian cellist and conductor, Antonio Janigro. After Janigro left the ensemble in 1968, the group was led first by their concertmaster, Dragutin Hrdjok, and then by their longtime artistic director and concertmaster, Tonko Ninić. In 1997, Anđelko Krpan became concertmaster, and in 2002, Karlo Slobodan Fio, took over as artistic director of the ensemble. Since 2006, the concertmaster and artistic leader has been Borivoj Martinic-Jercic. Since 2012, they have been performing with violinist Sreten Krstic as the concertmaster.

The Zagreb Soloists have given over 3,500 concerts in all parts of the world and are well known for their numerous recordings.
